= Clay Walker discography =

- Studio albums: 12
- Extended plays: 1
- Compilation albums: 3
- Singles: 36
- Music videos: 23
- #1 singles: 6

Clay Walker is an American country music artist. His discography comprises 11 studio albums and a greatest hits album, as well as 36 singles. Walker's first four studio albums—Clay Walker, If I Could Make a Living, Hypnotize the Moon and Rumor Has It—are all certified platinum by the RIAA, and his greatest hits album and Live, Laugh, Love are each certified gold by the RIAA. Clay Walker is also certified platinum by the CRIA, while If I Could Make a Living and Hypnotize the Moon are certified gold.

Of his singles, all have charted on Billboard Hot Country Songs, with all but two reaching the top 40. Six hit number one, including his first two single releases, "What's It to You" and "Live Until I Die", both from 1993, as well as "Dreaming with My Eyes Open" (1994), "If I Could Make a Living" (1994), "This Woman and This Man" (1995), and "Rumor Has It" (1997). All except "This Woman and This Man" were also number-one hits on the RPM country singles chart in Canada. Eleven more singles reached the top ten on the US country chart. Ten hits crossed over to the Billboard Hot 100, including two top-40 hits: "You're Beginning to Get to Me" (number 39, 1998–1999) and "The Chain of Love" (number 40, 2000).

== Studio albums ==
=== 1990s ===
Title	Album details	Peak chart positions				Certifications (sales thresholds)
Title	Album details	US Country	US	CAN Country	CAN	Certifications (sales thresholds)
Clay Walker	Release date: August 3, 1993; Label: Giant Nashville; Formats: CD, cassette	8	52	1	47	US: Platinum; CAN: Platinum
If I Could Make a Living	Release date: September 27, 1994; Label: Giant Nashville; Formats: CD, cassette	4	42	1	58	US: Platinum; CAN: Gold
Hypnotize the Moon	Release date: October 17, 1995; Label: Giant Nashville; Formats: CD, cassette	10	57	—	—	US: Platinum; CAN: Gold
Rumor Has It	Release date: April 8, 1997; Label: Giant Nashville; Formats: CD, cassette	4	32	7	—	US: Platinum
Live, Laugh, Love	Release date: August 24, 1999; Label: Giant Nashville; Formats: CD, cassette	5	55	23	—	US: Gold
"—" denotes releases that did not chart

=== 2000s, 2010s, and 2020s ===
Title	Album details	Peak chart positions	
Title	Album details	US Country	US
Say No More	Release date: March 27, 2001; Label: Giant Nashville; Formats: CD	14	129
Christmas	Release date: September 10, 2002; Label: Warner Bros. Nashville; Formats: CD	54	—
A Few Questions	Release date: September 9, 2003; Label: RCA Nashville; Formats: CD	3	23
Fall	Release date: April 17, 2007; Label: Asylum-Curb Records; Formats: CD, music download	5	15
She Won't Be Lonely Long	Release date: June 8, 2010; Label: Asylum-Curb Records; Formats: CD, music download	5	16
Long Live the Cowboy	Release date: January 21, 2019; Label: Maven Records; Formats: CD, music download	—	—
Texas to Tennessee	Release date: July 30, 2021; Label: Show Dog Nashville; Formats: CD, music download	—	—

== Compilation albums ==
Title	Album details	Peak chart positions			Certifications (sales thresholds)
Title	Album details	US Country	US	CAN Country	Certifications (sales thresholds)
Self Portrait	Release date: October 15, 1996; Label: Nu Millennia; Formats: CD, cassette	—	—	—	
Greatest Hits	Release date: June 9, 1998; Label: Giant Nashville; Formats: CD, cassette	9	41	18	RIAA: Gold
Platinum Collection	Release date: June 25, 2007; Label: Warner Bros. Nashville; Formats: CD, music download	—	—	—	
Top 10	Release date: July 20, 2010; Label: Warner Bros. Nashville; Formats: CD, music download	—	—	—	
Best of Clay Walker	Release date: February 11, 2014; Label: Curb Records; Formats: CD, music download	—	—	—	
"—" denotes releases that did not chart

== Extended plays ==
Title	Album details	Peak positions
Title	Album details	US Country
She Won't Be Lonely Long	Release date: February 2, 2010; Label: Curb Records; Formats: CD, music download	58

== Singles ==
=== 1990s ===
Year	Single	Peak chart positions			Album
Year	Single	US Country	US	CAN Country	Album
1993	"What's It to You"	1	73	1	Clay Walker
1993	"Live Until I Die"	1	— (Note: "Live Until I Die" did not enter the Hot 100, but peaked at number 7 on Bubbling Under Hot 100 Singles.)	1	Clay Walker
1994	"Where Do I Fit in the Picture"	11	—	6	Clay Walker
1994	"Dreaming with My Eyes Open"	1	—	1	Clay Walker
1994	"If I Could Make a Living"	1	— (Note: "If I Could Make a Living" did not enter the Hot 100, but peaked at number 21 on Bubbling Under Hot 100 Singles.)	1	If I Could Make a Living
1994	"This Woman and This Man"	1	—	2	If I Could Make a Living
1995	"My Heart Will Never Know"	16	—	6	If I Could Make a Living
1995	"Who Needs You Baby"	2	— (Note: "Who Needs You Baby" did not enter the Hot 100, but peaked at number 20 on Bubbling Under Hot 100 Singles.)	2	Hypnotize the Moon
1996	"Hypnotize the Moon"	2	— (Note: "Hypnotize the Moon" did not enter the Hot 100, but peaked at number 5 on Bubbling Under Hot 100 Singles.)	6	Hypnotize the Moon
1996	"Only on Days That End in "Y""	5	—	7	Hypnotize the Moon
1996	"Bury the Shovel"	18	—	24	Hypnotize the Moon
1997	"Rumor Has It"	1	—	1	Rumor Has It
1997	"One, Two, I Love You"	18	—	12	Rumor Has It
1997	"Watch This"	4	—	13	Rumor Has It
1998	"Then What?"	2	65	4	Rumor Has It
1998	"Ordinary People"	35	— (Note: "Ordinary People" did not enter the Hot 100, but peaked at number 20 on Bubbling Under Hot 100 Singles.)	22	Greatest Hits
1998	"You're Beginning to Get to Me"	2	39	7	Greatest Hits
1999	"She's Always Right"	16	74	35	Live, Laugh, Love
1999	"Live, Laugh, Love"	11	74	21	Live, Laugh, Love
"—" denotes releases that did not chart

=== 2000s, 2010s, and 2020s ===
Year	Single	Peak chart positions			Certifications	Album
Year	Single	US Country	US Country Airplay	US	Certifications	Album
2000	"The Chain of Love" (Note: "The Chain of Love" also peaked at number 6 on RPM Country Tracks.)	3		40		Live, Laugh, Love
2000	"Once in a Lifetime Love"	50		—		Live, Laugh, Love
2001	"Say No More"	33		—		Say No More
2001	"If You Ever Feel Like Lovin' Me Again"	27		—		Say No More
2003	"A Few Questions"	9		55		A Few Questions
2004	"I Can't Sleep"	9		61		A Few Questions
2004	"Jesus Was a Country Boy"	31		—		A Few Questions
2006	"'Fore She Was Mama"	21		— (Note: "'Fore She Was Mama" did not enter the Hot 100, but peaked at number 16 on Bubbling Under Hot 100 Singles.)		Fall
2007	"Fall"	5		55	RIAA: Gold	Fall
2008	"She Likes It in the Morning"	43		—		Fall
2009	"She Won't Be Lonely Long"	4		53	RIAA: 2× Platinum	She Won't Be Lonely Long
2010	"Where Do I Go from You"	26		—		She Won't Be Lonely Long
2011	"Like We Never Said Goodbye"	46		—		She Won't Be Lonely Long
2012	"Jesse James"	57	48	—		She Won't Be Lonely Long
2020	"Easy Goin'"	—	—	—		—N/a
2020	"Need a Bar Sometimes"	—	50	—		Texas to Tennessee
2022	"Catching Up with an Ol' Memory"	—	54	—		Texas to Tennessee
2024	"I Know She Hung the Moon"	—	—	—		—N/a
"—" denotes releases that did not chart

== Other charted songs ==
Year	Single	Peak chart positions		Album
Year	Single	US Country	CAN Country	Album
1994	"White Palace"	67	80	Clay Walker
1998	"Holding Her and Loving You" (live)	68	—	—N/a
1999	"Once in a Lifetime Love" (Note: "Once in a Lifetime Love" charted as an album cut in 1999 before being released as a single.)	73	—	Live, Laugh, Love
1999	"The Chain of Love" (Note: "The Chain of Love" charted as an album cut in 1999 before being released as a single.)	74	—	Live, Laugh, Love
2000	"Blue Christmas"	51	—	Believe: A Christmas Collection
2001	"Cowboy Christmas"	70	—	Believe: A Christmas Collection
2003	"Feliz Navidad"	49	—	Christmas
"—" denotes releases that did not chart

== Videography ==
=== Video albums ===
Title	Album details	Notes
Video Hits	Release date: June 9, 1998; Label: Warner Bros.; Format: VHS	Collection of Walker's music videos

=== Music videos ===
Year	Video	Director
1993	"What's It to You"	Marc Ball
1993	"Live Until I Die"	Marc Ball
1994	"Where Do I Fit in the Picture"	Michael Merriman
1994	"Dreaming with My Eyes Open"	Michael Merriman
1994	"If I Could Make a Living"	Michael Merriman
1995	"This Woman and This Man"	Bill Young
1995	"My Heart Will Never Know"	Bill Young
1995	"Who Needs You Baby"	Steven T. Miller/R. Brad Murano
1996	"Hypnotize the Moon"	Bill Young
1997	"Rumor Has It"	Bill Young
1997	"One, Two, I Love You"	Bill Young
1997	"Watch This"	Bill Young
1998	"Then What?"	Martin Kahan
1999	"She's Always Right"	Michael Merriman
1999	"Live, Laugh, Love"	Deaton Flanigen
2000	"The Chain of Love"	Michael Cargile
2004	"I Can't Sleep"	Trey Fanjoy
2007	"'Fore She Was Mama"	Roman White
2007	"Fall"	Roman White
2010	"She Won't Be Lonely Long"	Marcel
2012	"Jesse James"	Thadd Turner & Clay Walker
2020	"A Little While" (with Upchurch)	A. Luce Vision
2020	"Need A Bar Sometimes"	
