= Greatest Hits (Clay Walker album) =

Greatest hits album by Clay Walker
- Released: June 9, 1998
- Genre: Country
- Length: 44:39
- Label: Giant
- Producer: James Stroud

Clay Walker chronology
Rumor Has It (1997)	Greatest Hits (1998)	Live, Laugh, Love (1999)

Singles from Greatest Hits
- 1. "Ordinary People" Released: May 5, 1998; 2. "You're Beginning to Get to Me" Released: August 25, 1998

Greatest Hits is the first compilation album by American country music singer Clay Walker. It was released in 1998. Two previously unreleased tracks ("Ordinary People" and "You're Beginning to Get to Me") are included on this album; both were issued as singles in 1998. The former peaked at #35 on the Billboard country charts, while the latter was a #2 hit for Walker.

== Background ==
In an interview with Tulsa World, Walker stated about the album, "I'm just kind of funny about the word "great' being used with my name, putting "great' with something I do ... I don't know. I'm really not that kind of guy".

== Track listing ==
No.	Title	Writer(s)	Length
1.	"What's It to You"	Robert Ellis Orrall, Curtis Wright	2:47
2.	"You're Beginning to Get to Me"	Aaron Barker, Tom Shapiro	2:41
3.	"Live Until I Die"	Clay Walker	2:50
4.	"This Woman and This Man"	Michael Lunn, Jeff Pennig	4:22
5.	"Dreaming with My Eyes Open"	Tony Arata	3:30
6.	"Rumor Has It"	M. Jason Greene, Walker	3:09
7.	"Hypnotize the Moon"	Eric Kaz, Steve Dorff	3:38
8.	"Then What?"	Jon Vezner, Randy Sharp	3:03
9.	"Where Do I Fit in the Picture"	Walker	3:55
10.	"If I Could Make a Living"	Alan Jackson, Roger Murrah, Keith Stegall	2:12
11.	"Ordinary People"	Ed Hill, Craig Wiseman	3:49
12.	"Only on Days That End in "Y""	Richard Fagan	2:45
13.	"Watch This"	Ron Harbin, Barker, Anthony L. Smith	3:10
14.	"Who Needs You Baby"	Walker, Kim Williams, Randy Boudreaux	2:48

== Personnel ==
- Eddie Bayers – drums
- Bruce Bouton – steel guitar
- Mike Brignardello – bass guitar
- Larry Byrom – acoustic guitar, electric guitar
- Jimmy Carter – bass guitar
- Steve Dorff – conductor, string arrangements
- Dan Dugmore – steel guitar
- Glen Duncan – fiddle
- Stuart Duncan – fiddle, mandolin
- Paul Franklin – dobro, steel guitar
- Kyle Frederick – acoustic guitar
- Sonny Garrish – steel guitar
- Johnny Gimble – fiddle
- Aubrey Haynie – fiddle
- John Hobbs – piano
- Jim Horn – saxophone
- Byron House – bass guitar
- Dann Huff – electric guitar
- Jana King – background vocals
- Terry McMillan – harmonica
- Brent Mason – electric guitar
- Tim Mensy – acoustic guitar
- The Nashville String Machine – strings
- Steve Nathan – keyboards, piano
- Bobby Ogdin – piano
- Larry Paxton – bass guitar
- Van Rentz – piano
- Tom Roady – percussion
- Jason Roberts – fiddle
- Matt Rollings – piano
- Brent Rowan – acoustic guitar, electric guitar
- John Wesley Ryles – background vocals
- Tim Sargeant – steel guitar
- Maxwell Schauf – drums
- Leland Sklar – bass guitar
- Joe Spivey – fiddle
- Landon Taylor – electric guitar
- Wayne Toups – accordion
- Clay Walker – lead vocals
- Billy Joe Walker Jr. – acoustic guitar
- Lonnie Wilson – drums
- Glenn Worf – bass guitar
- Curtis Wright – background vocals
- Curtis Young – background vocals

== Critical reception ==
Professional ratings
Review scores
Source	Rating
Allmusic	4.5/5 stars
Country Standard Time	(favorable)
Sunday Mail	(favorable)

Kris Teo of Sunday Mail wrote "The material will never be confused with thinking man's country since it punches all the predictable thematic buttons. On this solid 14-track smoking-gun compilation, he celebrates the trials and tribulations of the common man." Jason Birchmeier of AllMusic gave the album four and a half stars and wrote, "you won't find a better one-disc summary of his prime." Walter Allread of Country Standard Time gave the album a favorable review.

== Chart performance ==
During the week of June 27, 1998, the album sold over 35,000 units.

=== Weekly charts ===
Chart (1998)	Peak position
Canadian Country Albums (RPM)	18
US Billboard 200	41
US Top Country Albums (Billboard)	9

=== Year-end charts ===
Chart (1998)	Position
US Top Country Albums (Billboard)	32
Chart (1999)	Position
US Top Country Albums (Billboard)	52

=== Certifications ===
Country	Certification
United States	Gold
