= Rumor Has It =

Rumor Has It or Rumour Has It may refer to:

== Film and television ==
- Rumor Has It (film), a 2005 romantic comedy film
- Rumor Has It (game show), a 1993 game show on VH1
- Rumour Has It , a 2016 series by Ndani TV
- "Rumor Has It", a season 5 episode of The Loud House

== Music ==
- "Rumour Has It" (Donna Summer song), 1978
- Rumor Has It (Reba McEntire album), 1990
  - "Rumor Has It" (Reba McEntire song), a single from the album
- Rumor Has It (Clay Walker album), 1997
  - "Rumor Has It" (Clay Walker song), a single from the album
- Rumor Has It: Astaroth Has Stolen Your Eyes, a 2006 album by Catherine
- Rumor Has It, a fictional talk show featured in the 2008 music video "La La Land" by Demi Lovato
- "Rumour Has It" (Adele song), 2011

== Other uses ==
- "Rumor Has It", the tagline for the website Snopes.com
