= Say No More =

Say No More may refer to:

- Say No More (band), an American rock band
- a catchphrase of the Monty Python sketch Nudge Nudge
- Kuch Naa Kaho, or Say No More, a 2003 Indian romantic drama film by Rohan Sippy

== Albums ==
- Say No More (Badfinger album), 1981
- Say No More (Clay Walker album), 2001
- Say No More (House of Heroes album), 2006
- Say No More (Linda Lewis album), 1971
- Say No More (Bob Ostertag album)
- Say No More, a 1996 album by Charly García

== Songs ==
- "Say No More" (song), a 2001 song by Clay Walker
- "Say No More", by David Kitt from Not Fade Away
- "Say No More", by Innosense from So Together
- "Say No More (Mon Amour)" by Maxwell Caulfield from Empire Records
- "Say No More", by Steelheart from Wait
- "Say No More", by Tyne-James Organ from Persevere
