= Love Trip =

Love Trip may refer to:

- Love Trip (Takako Mamiya album), 1982 city pop music album
- Love Trip (Jerry Kilgore album), a 1999 country music album, or its title track
- Love Trip / Shiawase o Wakenasai, a 2016 musical single
