= Jerry Kilgore =

Jerry Kilgore may refer to:

- Jerry Kilgore (politician) (born 1961), American attorney and politician
- Jerry Kilgore (singer) (born 1964), American country music artist
