= Then What =

Then What may refer to:

- "Then What?", a 1998 song by Clay Walker
- "Then What" (Illy song), 2019
