= Say No More (Clay Walker album) =

Studio album by Clay Walker
- Released: March 27, 2001
- Studios: Emerald Sound, Nashville; Essential Sound, Nashville; Ocean Way, Nashville; Cool Tools, Nashville; The Tin Ear, Nashville; SugarHill, Houston
- Genre: Country
- Length: 38:18
- Label: Giant
- Producers: Byron Gallimore; Brent Mason; Blake Mevis; Clay Walker

Clay Walker chronology
Live, Laugh, Love (1999)	Say No More (2001)	Christmas (2002)

Singles from Say No More
- 1. "Say No More" Released: February 12, 2001; 2. "If You Ever Feel Like Lovin' Me Again" Released: June 25, 2001

Say No More is the sixth studio album by American country music singer Clay Walker. It was released on March 27, 2001, as his last studio album for the Giant Records label. After this album's release, Giant Records closed. The album reached #129 on the Billboard album charts. The album's two singles were its title track and "If You Ever Feel Like Loving Me Again", both of which were minor Top 40 hits on the Hot Country Songs charts. In addition to these singles, the album features a cover of Ritchie Valens' "La Bamba".

== Background ==
During an interview, Walker stated he had a dream when he recorded Say No More which was "Selling dreams, that's what I want my music to do." He also stated that the album is "Riskier, yet potentially more fulfilling" than some of his other albums. In press releases, Walker said that recording La Bamba "took a lot of guts to try this, because I know some people will rip me for it. I worked four years learning enough Spanish because I wanted it to be so correct that when a Latino hears it, he doesn't go, 'There's a gringo.'"

In an interview with the Arizona Daily Star Walker said, "There was a serious breakdown and a huge lack of effort to promote this album. Really, this project has gotten lost. It's kind of heartbreaking as an artist, but it's one of those lumps you take on the chin. I have a lot of ambition and a lot of heart and a lot of things to prove to myself, I'm not happy with the level we're at. I feel like we could be higher. . . . It's driven me to be a better artist."

While promoting "A Few Questions", Walker told the Daily News, "I was on Giant my whole career. The last record we did, the label folded two weeks after it was released. That stung me, but I'm proud of the music we made and that's the only way I'll look back." When Giant Records closed in April 2001, president of Warner Bros. Records Jim Ed Norman said, "Our first responsibility is to deal with artists who have records out and focus on them -- Clay, the Wilkinsons and Blake Shelton. We'll jump in, full steam, with those people to determine how we assume responsibility for marketing and promoting their work."

== Critical reception ==
Professional ratings
Review scores
Source	Rating
AllMusic	3/5 stars
Atlanta Constitution	(B)
Houston Chronicle	(B)
Ottawa Citizen	3/5 stars
Pittsburgh Post-Gazette	4/5 stars
USA Today	2/5 stars

Michael Paoletta and Ray Waddell of Billboard gave the album a positive review, writing "Say No More is a sonically adventurous album on which Walker offers more pop tendencies than usual, without sacrificing his country pedigree. This is a diverse package that effectively demonstrates Walker's versatility and maturity." Mario Tarradell of The Dallas Morning News also gave it a positive rating, calling the album the "most complete and accomplished outing since his solid, self-titled 1993 debut." Tarradell also wrote "The record offers a convincing batch of tunes that showcase his pliable voice, his country and swing roots and his penchant for melody-heavy commercial ballads. He's frequently traded Texas grit for Nashville polish but with Say No More he's combined both to create classy, commercial country.

Carole L. Philipps of The Cincinnati Post wrote "Clay Walker, the country boy next door, has put together as pretty a package as has been heard recently from Nashville. He croons his way through elegant love songs, down-home country tunes, juke joint anthems and punctuates the 11-song effort with a stunning cover of the late Richie Valens hit, "La Bamba," sung in well-studied Spanish." Michael D. Clark of the Houston Chronicle gave the album a B rating and wrote "The good news for Walker fans is that the country-pop album formula that has stoked his career hasn't been abandoned. He simply has turned it inside out. Instead of throwing a weeper like This Woman and This Man or Hypnotize the Moon in along with his rodeo swagger, Say No More is built on gut kicks. Overall, though, Say No More finds a light-footed hip-swiveler with a heavy heart and a tear in his eye.

Brian Mansfield of USA Today gave the album two stars and said, "For Clay Walker, there's a winding road, or some other equally clichéd phrase, in every song -- whether it's a deep ocean, a fire burning in his soul, or a woman who takes his breath away. Track after track, the smooth-singing Texan piles it on -- there's an ordinary song about an "unordinary" girl and a slick song about being rough around the edges. That these trite romantic blandishments or the out-of-nowhere cover of La Bamba remain at all listenable speaks volumes for the appealing earnestness of Walker's voice". USA Today also listed the album as the sixth-worst country album of 2001.

BPI Entertainment News Wire gave the album a positive review, writing, "Say No More is a sonically adventurous album on which Walker offers more pop tendencies than usual, without sacrificing his country pedigree. He sings with passion throughout, especially on piano-based ballads like Real the soulful You Deliver Me, and the conversational Could I Ask You Not to Dance. This is a diverse package that effectively demonstrates Walker's versatility and maturity." Maria Konicki Dinoia of AllMusic described the album by writing "Say No More is a fine album from an artist who has proved his staying power time and time again." Jerry Sharpe of the Pittsburgh Post-Gazette gave the album a four star rating and wrote, "All told, it's a nice mixture masterfully performed. Consider this a "don't miss" disc for Walker fans." Mike Clark of Country Standard Time gave the album a negative review by writing, "Neither pop nor country, this is easily Walker's least satisfying CD. "Say No More" indeed."

Al Levine of The Atlanta Constitution gave the album a B rating and wrote, "On this surprising package, Walker not only displays strong pipes, but the song selection is a revelation. He pulls off a strong performance in the hymn "You Deliver Me." "If You Ever Feel Like Lovin' Me Again," is as good as anything semisweet coming out of Nashville these days. "Rough Around the Edges" captures the spirit of every unpolished soul still sorting out life's complexities. Walker is huge in Texas, and he plays to his crowd with "Texas Swing" (you can almost hear George Strait) and "La Bamba," which will never replace the original but is appealing anyway." Jolene Downs of About.com gave the album a favorable review and wrote, "If you've liked Clay's previous work, you'll really enjoy this album. There isn't a bad song on here. There are traditional songs, powerful ballads, and a little western swing. Something for everyone." Ben Scott of The Oklahoman gave the album a positive review. Scott praised Walker's cover of "La Bamba" by writing "The country crooner gives an impressive delivery in Spanish and tossed in a couple of nice instrumental solos." DJ Johnny Sixpack of Slipcue gave the album a negative review and wrote, ""Easy To Hold" and "Texas Swing" are the only tracks on here worth paying attention to. Everything else is way too wimpy and popped-out. A big, big disappointment." Editors at The Ottawa Citizen gave the album a rating of three stars and wrote, "Walker's voice, like many of his contemporaries', is a little generic and self-conscious for my taste, and he too often gravitates toward radio-happy numbers whose slickness almost conceals their blandness. And while love may be a many-splendored thing, relationship songs do wear thin. Still, the guy works damn hard at what he does, and the sweat and sincerity give his albums a tough core that's refreshing."

== Track listing ==
No.	Title	Writer(s)	Length
1.	"Say No More"	George Teren, Tom Shapiro	3:15
2.	"Real"	Ron Harbin, Noah Gordon, Richie McDonald	3:33
3.	"If You Ever Feel Like Lovin' Me Again"	Jeff Stevens, Steve Bogard, Jerry Kilgore	3:52
4.	"Could I Ask You Not to Dance"	Harbin, Anthony L. Smith, Aaron Barker	3:26
5.	"La Bamba"	Ritchie Valens	2:28
6.	"You Deliver Me"	Brian Ede Nash, David Pearson, Mike Post	4:26
7.	"I Love It"	Phillip Douglas, Harbin, Jimmy Yeary	3:12
8.	"She's Easy to Hold"	Clay Walker, Kim Williams, Kent Blazy	3:35
9.	"Rough Around the Edges"	Williams, Lance Miller, Darryl Worley	3:12
10.	"Texas Swing"	Walker, Williams, L. David Lewis	2:38
11.	"So Much More"	M. Jason Greene, Walker	4:41

== Personnel ==
As listed in liner notes.

- Steven R. Conn – squeeze box on "La Bamba"
- Shannon Forrest – drums
- Larry Franklin – fiddle on "She's Easy to Hold" and "Rough Around the Edges"
- Paul Franklin – steel guitar
- Tony Harrell – piano
- Michael Haynes – horns on "La Bamba"
- Aubrey Haynie – fiddle
- Wes Hightower – background vocals
- Dirk Johnson – synthesizer
- B. James Lowry – electric guitar
- Brent Mason – electric guitar
- Gene Miller – background vocals
- Steve Nathan – keyboards
- Chris Rodriguez – background vocals
- Matt Rollings – piano
- John Wesley Ryles – background vocals
- Javier Solis – congas on "La Bamba"
- Bryan Sutton – acoustic guitar on "Rough Around the Edges" & "Texas Swing"
- Clay Walker – lead vocals
- Biff Watson – acoustic guitar
- Lonnie Wilson – drums
- Glenn Worf – bass guitar

== Chart performance ==
Chart (2001)	Peak position
U.S. Billboard 200	129
U.S. Billboard Top Country Albums	14
