= Texas to Tennessee =

Studio album by Clay Walker
- Released: July 30, 2021
- Genre: Country
- Length: 29:41
- Label: Show Dog Nashville
- Producer: Michael Knox; Jaron Boyer

Clay Walker chronology
Long Live the Cowboy (2019)	Texas to Tennessee (2021)

Singles from Texas to Tennessee
- 1. "Need a Bar Sometimes" Released: August 14, 2020; 2. "Catching Up With An Ol' Memory" Released: February 21, 2022

Texas to Tennessee is the eleventh studio album by American country music artist Clay Walker. It was released on July 30, 2021 as his first album for Show Dog Nashville. The lead-off single, "Need a Bar Sometimes", was released in August 2020 and became Walker's first charting single on the Billboard Country Airplay chart since "Jesse James" in 2012.

The album's title is a reference to Walker recording the album in both Nashville, Tennessee and Galveston, Texas. Walker co-wrote all ten tracks on the album, six of which were co-written with Jaron Boyer, who produced the album alongside Michael Knox.

== Track listing ==
All tracks are written by Clay Walker, with additional co-writers as noted.

Texas to Tennessee
No.	Title	Writer(s)	Length
1.	"Anything to Do with You"	Brandon Kinney; Shane Minor; Mike Mobley	3:08
2.	"Need a Bar Sometimes"	Jaron Boyer; Josh Mirenda; George Birge	2:44
3.	"Catching Up with an Ol' Memory"	Boyer; Birge; Lalo Guzman	3:24
4.	"Country Side"	Boyer; Lynn Wilbanks	2:46
5.	"Cowboy Loves a Woman"	Jennifer Hanson; Mark Nesler	3:30
6.	"Texas to Tennessee"	Hanson; Nesler	3:04
7.	"I Just Wanna Hold You"	Boyer; Ben Stennis	2:58
8.	"Loving You Then"	Boyer; Brad Rempel; Stennis	2:54
9.	"You Look Good"	Boyer; Michael Tyler	2:55
10.	"One More"	David Lee Murphy; Justin Weaver	2:13
Total length:			29:41

== Chart performance ==
Chart (2021)	Peak position
U.S. Billboard Top Album Sales	79
U.S. Billboard Top Current Album Sales	45
