= Fall (Clay Walker song) =

2007 country song

Single by Clay Walker

from the album Fall
- Released: April 9, 2007
- Genre: Country
- Length: 3:37
- Label: Asylum-Curb
- Songwriters: Sonny LeMaire; Shane Minor; Clay Mills
- Producer: Keith Stegall

Clay Walker singles chronology
"'Fore She Was Mama" (2006)	"Fall" (2007)	"She Likes It in the Morning" (2008)

"Fall", written by Clay Mills, Sonny LeMaire, and Shane Minor, is a song that has been recorded by both country singer Clay Walker and pop singer Kimberley Locke, both of whom are signed to Curb Records. Both versions were released within weeks of each other, in mid-2007. While Walker's version was released to country radio, Locke's went to adult contemporary radio format. Walker's reached number five on the U.S. country singles charts and Locke's achieved number one on the U.S. dance charts. Go West frontman Peter Cox recorded a version of "Fall" on his 2010 album, The S1 Sessions.

== Content ==
"Fall" is a mid-tempo ballad in which the narrator addresses a lover who has had a bad day. The narrator then offers moral support to the lover: "Fall, go on and lose it all / Every doubt, every fear / Every worry, every tear".

== Clay Walker version ==
Walker's version, the first version of the song to be released, was the second single from his 2007 album, which was also titled Fall. A music video was issued on October 17, 2007.

=== Background ===
Walker stated that Fall was one of his favorite songs on his album. He also said after recording the track that “Keith stood up and high-fived the engineer when we got done with the vocal and I thought, that’s the first that I’ve ever seen that, maybe he was just glad that I got all the lyrics right, it was refreshing to know there wasn’t a lot of wasted time in the studio with Keith. He knows what he wants, and he communicates that with the musicians really well."

In an interview with The Flint Journal Walker said, "'Fall' was a huge hit for us. I think people are going to want to see us and ticket sales are already going up. As long as people want to hear us -- and I feel like they do -- we're going to get out and give it to them."

=== Critical reception ===
Chuck Taylor of Billboard wrote, "Walker's rich, confident baritone offers all the more reassurance, as does his self-assured smile". Kevin John Coyne of Country Universe gave the song a B+ rating and wrote, "This is another good single from an artist who has fully come into his own."

=== Music video ===
Roman White directed the song's music video.

=== Live performances ===
Walker performed the song on The Montel Williams Show on April 11, 2008.

=== Chart performance ===
Walker's version of the song debuted at #59 on the Hot Country Songs chart dated April 7, 2007. It charted for 37 weeks and peaked at #5 on the country chart dated November 17, 2007. It became his first Top Ten country hit since "I Can't Sleep", which reached #9 in late 2003-early 2004. This version also peaked at #56 on the Billboard Hot 100, his first peak on that chart since "I Can't Sleep".

=== Charts ===
Chart (2007)	Peak position
US Hot Country Songs (Billboard)	5
US Billboard Hot 100	55

=== Year-end charts ===
Chart (2007)	Peak position
U.S. Billboard Hot Country Songs	40

== Kimberley Locke version ==
"Fall"

Single by Kimberley Locke

from the album Based on a True Story
- Released: February 25, 2008; April 8, 2008 (remixes)
- Recorded: 2007
- Genre: Pop
- Length: 3:31 (album version); 3:16 (radio edit)
- Label: Curb
- Songwriters: Sonny LeMaire; Shane Minor; Clay Mills
- Producer: Matthew Gerrard

Kimberley Locke singles chronology
"Frosty the Snowman" (2007)	"Fall" (2008)	"We Need a Little Christmas" (2008)

Kimberley Locke covered the song as the third single from her album Based on a True Story, which was released only 2 weeks after Clay Walker's album. Locke's version was released to Adult Contemporary radio on February 25, 2008, with club remixes following in April.

Billboard reviewed the single as "a stunning showcase for the versatile vocalist" and suggests this may be her most satisfying single yet along with "8th World Wonder".

=== Track listings and formats ===
- US promotional single - CURBD-2073
1. "Fall (radio edit) - 3:16
- US promotional remixes maxi single - CURBD-2087
1. "Fall" (Bimbo Jones extended mix) - 7:22
2. "Fall" (Almighty club mix) - 7:03
3. "Fall" (Piper extended club mix) - 7:48
4. "Fall" (Scotty K vocal Klub mix) - 6:54
5. "Fall" (Almighty dub) - 6:40
6. "Fall" (Bimbo Jones radio edit) - 3:33
7. "Fall" (Almighty radio edit) - 3:21
8. "Fall" (Piper radio edit) - 3:53
9. "Fall" (Scotty K radio edit) - 3:48
- Digital maxi single / The Radio Edits EP
1. "Fall" (Bimbo Jones radio edit) - 3:32
2. "Fall" (Almighty radio edit) - 3:22
3. "Fall" (Piper radio edit) - 3:53
4. "Fall" (Scotty K radio edit) - 3:48
- Digital maxi single / The Extended Mixes EP
1. "Fall" (Bimbo Jones extended mix) - 7:21
2. "Fall" (Almighty club mix) - 7:03
3. "Fall" (Piper extended club mix) - 7:47
4. "Fall" (Scotty K vocal Klub mix) - 6:54

=== Chart performance ===
Chart (2008)	Peak position
U.S. Billboard Hot Dance Club Play	1
U.S. Billboard Hot Adult Contemporary Tracks	17

Chart (2008)	Peak position
U.S. Billboard Top AC Songs of 2008	33
U.S. Billboard Top Dance Songs of 2008	39

== See also ==
- Number-one dance hits of 2008 (USA)
