= A Few Questions (song) =

Single by Clay Walker

from the album A Few Questions
- Released: April 28, 2003
- Genre: Country
- Length: 3:46
- Label: RCA Nashville
- Songwriters: Ray Scott; Phillip Moore; Adam Wheeler
- Producers: Jimmy Ritchey; Clay Walker

Clay Walker singles chronology
"If You Ever Feel Like Lovin' Me Again" (2001)	"A Few Questions" (2003)	"I Can't Sleep" (2004)

"A Few Questions" is a song written by Ray Scott, Phillip Moore and Adam Wheeler, and recorded by American country music singer Clay Walker. It was released in April 2003 as the lead-off single and title track from his album A Few Questions. It peaked at #9 on the Billboard Hot Country Singles & Tracks charts.

== Background ==
Walker revealed after he heard the song that "[he] got it immediately. There was no mistaking that the song would belong to [his] life."

In an interview with Country Weekly, Walker said, "It feels awesome to be back on the radio with a new song. Our last hit was two years ago with 'Chain of Love.' There's nothing as cool as reaching fans with fresh music." Walker also said, "'A Few Questions' is touching people the way it touched me the first time I heard it. The choruses come right out of the Book of Job. When I was diagnosed with multiple sclerosis back in 1996, the Book of Job is part of the Bible I read over and over, trying to understand what I needed to do. And every time I sing the song, it lifts up my own spirits as much as it lifts those of others. My favorite line in the song is "When you look down on me, can you see the good through all the bad." That's a powerful thought." In another interview with Country Weekly Walker stated, "It's a very deep song to me. It really relates to me in a lot of ways, because I think everybody has questions in life.

In an interview with the Arizona Daily Star, Walker said, "In today's world, you couple the music that's out there and the world events, I think people just want some stuff that's got substance to it, it's kind of neat to have one of those songs." In an interview with The Atlanta Journal-Constitution, Walker stated, "I was in Salt Lake City and took a call from a lady, and she was crying. She said the song really affected her in a way, because there's a line that goes, "How can two people who've built a loving home/Try for years and never have a child of their own?/And somewhere out there tonight/There's a baby no one's holding tight." She told me, "I watched my sister-in-law have two children and not even care about them. I've always wanted kids and can't even have them. And now I know the answer to that question [in the song], because I've adopted those two kids." So the song has really had an impact on people, and I've been really blessed to have a song like that." After playing a concert in Oregon, Walker said, "It's so exciting to see the reaction of the fans and realize that this song has moved them the way it moved me the first time I heard it."

During an interview with CMT, Walker revealed that philosophical songs like "A Few Questions", "The Chain of Love" and "It Ain't Pretty", are not his favorite form of songs when he said, "Those kinds of story songs are the ones that choke you up. I'm not a person that tends to listen to those songs a whole lot because they are deep. I like something with a little more vocal range in it. But those three songs really do make me think. It takes great songwriters to write them because they're totally lyric-based. They're not standing on production. They're standing on the story and the words." Walker told the Daily News, "I haven't had a new single at radio in a couple of years, but now I am on the best label in town. Whether I fumble or not is up to me."

== Content ==
"A Few Questions" is a country pop ballad with string section, piano, and classical guitar accompaniment. In it, the male narrator asks God a few questions that he has in mind, such as why a couple could fail to produce a child, when there are other children who are unloved and in need of a family.

An electric guitar solo precedes the third verse, in which he asks what God thinks of him ("Can you see the good through all the bad").

== Critical reception ==
Rick Cohoon of Allmusic gave the song a negative review. In his review, he stated that "it really isn't Clay Walker or his performance of [the song] that is so moving." Cohoon also said that "he [Walker] delivers this song in the same way he handles all his other ballads." In his review of the album, Dan MacIntosh of Country Standard Time wrote, "Walker is equally inept at theology, as this album's title track fails to help explain why bad things happen to good people."

== Chart positions ==
"A Few Questions" debuted at number 58 on the U.S. Billboard Hot Country Songs chart for the week dated April 26, 2003.After spending 21 weeks on the chart, it peaked at #9 on the country chart dated September 13, 2003, where it held for four consecutive weeks. It spent a total of 27 weeks on the country chart.

=== Charts ===
Chart (2003)	Peak position
US Hot Country Songs (Billboard)	9
US Billboard Hot 100	55

=== Year-end charts ===
Chart (2003)	Peak position
U.S. Billboard Hot Country Songs	35
