= Fall (Clay Walker album) =

Studio album by Clay Walker
- Released: April 17, 2007
- Recorded: 2006
- Studio: Starstruck, Nashville; Ocean Way, Nashville; The Sound Station, Nashville
- Genre: Country
- Length: 43:07
- Label: Asylum-Curb
- Producer: Jimmy Ritchey; Keith Stegall

Clay Walker chronology
A Few Questions (2003)	Fall (2007)	She Won't Be Lonely Long (2010)

Singles from Fall
- 1. "'Fore She Was Mama" Released: October 16, 2006; 2. "Fall" Released: April 9, 2007; 3. "She Likes It in the Morning" Released: January 29, 2008

Fall is the eighth studio album by American country music singer Clay Walker, released on April 17, 2007, by Asylum-Curb Records. Its first single was "'Fore She Was Mama", which reached #21 on the Hot Country Songs charts in mid-2007. Following this song was the title track, which reached #5 on the same chart and became Walker's first Top Five country hit since "The Chain of Love" in 2000. "Fall" was also covered by Kimberley Locke, whose own version was a single as well. The third and final single from this album, "She Likes It in the Morning", peaked at #43. Also included is a cover of Freddy Fender's "Before the Next Teardrop Falls", recorded here as a duet with Fender. This cover is also Walker's first duet.

== Background ==
In 2005, after being released from RCA Nashville Walker stated about this album "I've written half an album and (I'm) putting together a record deal right now. This is the first time in my life that I have been free from contractual obligation to a record label. It's really a breath of fresh air that I can just write some songs that aren't influenced by a label." After switching to Curb, during an interview Walker said, "You know, when an artist is on a record label you hope to have some sort of a professional family atmosphere. I think the Curb folks are really cool. They have their way of doing things and they get it done." In an interview with GAC prior to the album's release Walker said "The biggest thing that I wanted to do was to just get songs on the radio and make music that people love. I wanted to continue the style they've known me for and not change things too much because the music we've made in the past is good music." On the website Nashville Hype Walker stated, “I love the country sound of this record, every one of these songs has a cool flavor to it and none of them sound alike. That’s what I love. I guess the only common thing to the whole thing is the fact that they are country.”

In 2003, after "A Few Questions" was released Walker said, "I would like to do a duet with someone. I don't know who it will be, but I am sure that in the future, maybe on the next album, there will be a duet. As a matter of fact, it is a goal of mine to do a duet with somebody." In an interview with The Columbus Dispatch Walker revealed that while speaking with Freddy Fender about recording the duet "Before the Next Teardrop Falls", Fender said "I wanted to do it with you because I know you have MS -- and so we both probably share a lot of the same beliefs and feelings. I want you to know this is not just a song; it is a piece of my heart. I'm giving it to you." Walker told the Associated Press, "That will always be his song, but there was total magic in the studio. He put his hand on my shoulder and said he had been asked to do it hundreds of time but had never done it, but that he felt that this was the right moment. It was the last song he ever recorded, so I'm proud to be part of his legacy. When asked about the long break between releases, Walker said, "Yeah, I think it was too long. There was a lot of red tape leaving one record label and going to another one. It was a process that was excruciating."

In an interview with CMT, Walker explained why he chose Keith Stegall to produce the album when he said, "I always loved his style with Alan Jackson, and, of course, I already knew that he wrote 'If I Could Make a Living.' I kind of wanted to get back to that sound, to get more of a pure form of country. It's really cool because when you listen to Keith's productions, you can get fooled [into thinking], 'This is a stone-cold country guy.' He is that. But the truth is that he wrote an old disco hit called 'Sexy Eyes.' He's very versatile." Walker told the Anderson Valley Post, "I wrote a song in San Diego for my first Curb album and called it ‘I Hate Nights Like This’. It describes a beautiful, starry night by the ocean and it's really a true story. The lyrics are, ‘I hate nights like this, it makes me want to be in love.’ I think it's really soulful and heartfelt."

Walker explained the album to The Torch, when he said, "It's very stripped down. There isn't a lot of production or synthesizers. That's why I really wanted to work with Keith Stegall on this. I wanted to get that great George Strait sound. It just sounds so much better because you can hear all the instruments and all the lyrics. This is definitely a more traditional-type record than I have released in the recent past. It reminds me more of the first album I released." He also said, ""I really feel like this is going to launch the next part of our career. I'd like to just stay on the charts over the next five years or so. Maybe get some Awards and nominations and do some TV."

== Promotion ==
On April 2, 2007, Walker performed the national anthem as well as "God Bless America" at the Houston Astros opening day game. Walker stated "I love Houston, it's home and I'm proud to be an Astros fan. This is my first opening day and I am ecstatic to perform in front of my favorite fans!"

Walker also appeared on Last Call with Carson Daly and The Late Late Show with Craig Ferguson to promote the album.

== Track listing ==
No.	Title	Writer(s)	Length
1.	"'Fore She Was Mama"	Casey Beathard; Phil O'Donnell	3:43
2.	"Fall"	Sonny LeMaire; Shane Minor; Clay Mills	3:37
3.	"Workin' Man"	Clay Walker; M. Jason Greene	3:55
4.	"Miami and Me"	Walker; Greene	4:02
5.	"She Likes It in the Morning"	Walker; Greene	3:50
6.	"Mexico"	Walker; Greene	2:41
7.	"You're My Witness"	Walker; Greene	3:38
8.	"Average Joe"	Ed Hill; Don Poythress; David Frasier	3:09
9.	"It Ain't Pretty (But It's Beautiful)"	Doug Johnson; Nicole Witt; Kim Williams	4:00
10.	"Before the Next Teardrop Falls" (duet with Freddy Fender)	Ben Peters; Vivian Keith	2:39
11.	"I'd Love to Be Your Last"	Rivers Rutherford; Annie Tate; Sam Tate	3:24
12.	"I Hate Nights Like This"	Walker	4:21

== Critical reception ==
Professional ratings
Review scores
Source	Rating
About.com	(favorable)
Albuquerque Journal	3/5 stars
AllMusic	3.5/5 stars
Associated Press	(favorable)
Country Standard Time	(mixed)
Country Weekly	3/5 stars
Irish Times	3/5 stars
Music Review Zone	3.5/5 stars
Stylus Magazine	(favorable)
Engine 145	3/5 stars

The website Music Review Zone gave the album 3 1/2 stars writing "This is pure country charm all wrapped up in a CD. You won’t be disappointed." Jeffrey B. Remz of Country Standard Time gave the album a mixed review writing "Walker certainly did not make a great album here, but he demonstrated he shouldn't be waiting so long until the next time either." Stephen Thomas Erlewine of AllMusic called it "his most enjoyable collection in some time." Josh Love of Stylus Magazine wrote, "Fall is particularly heavy on heartfelt, optimistic love songs, which normally might send up all sorts of red flags considering how often treacle gets mistaken for romance in country. Fortunately, Walker’s sincere devotionals possess a simplicity and underplayed grace that so many of his maudlin contemporaries lack."

The Associated Press wrote, "Fall improves his batting average and should continue to extend, and maybe even expand, his long-running popularity." Brady Vercher of Engine 145 gave the album three stars and wrote, "Fall, is a decent quality album with Clay Walker’s unique stamp all over it." About.com gave the album a positive review and wrote, the album "is solid from start to finish" and also said it is a, "great twelve-song collection from one of Country Music's finest talents." Editors at The Irish Times gave the album three stars and wrote, "All in all, Walker champions the average (there's even a song called Average Joe) in an average, unchallenging way." Nathalie Baret of the Albuquerque Journal gave the album three stars and wrote, "It offers up many hearty ballads that have a gentleman's "aw, shucks" clean country appeal as well as personal depth."

Editors at Country Weekly gave the album three stars and wrote, "Fall is a retreat to safer territory, a set of solid but unexceptional songs distinguished only by being well sung. When challenged with better material, Clay rises to the occasion."

== Personnel ==
Adapted from liner notes.

=== Musicians ===
Vocals

- Melodie Crittenden – background vocals (4, 7, 9, 12)
- Freddy Fender – duet vocals (10)
- John Wesley Ryles – background vocals (1–9, 12)
- Clay Walker – lead vocals (all tracks)

Musicians

- Eddie Bayers – drums (8)
- Eric Darken – percussion (6)
- Stuart Duncan – fiddle (3, 7, 8, 11 & 12), mandolin (1, 10–12)
- Larry Franklin – fiddle (2, 5, 6)
- Paul Franklin — steel guitar (tracks)
- Steve Gibson – acoustic guitar (all tracks)
- Rob Hajacos – fiddle (4, 9)
- Shane Keister – B3 organ (2, 6), keyboards (4, 6)
- Jeff King – electric guitar (1, 2, 4–6 & 9)
- Brent Mason – acoustic guitar (10), electric guitar (3, 7, 8, 11, 12)
- Gordon Mote – piano (1, 7, 10–12)
- The Nashville String Machine – strings (5, 9, 11)
- Dave Pomeroy – bass guitar (1, 11, 12)
- Gary Prim – piano (2–5, 9), keyboards (2–5 & 9), B3 organ (7)
- Hargus "Pig" Robbins –piano (8)
- Kris Wilkinson – string arrangements (5, 9, 11)
- John Willis – acoustic guitar (8)
- Lonnie Wilson – drums (all tracks except 8)
- Glenn Worf – bass guitar (all tracks except 1, 11, 12)

Production

- Tracks 1–11 Produced by – Keith Stegall
- Track 12 Produced by – Jimmy Ritchey
- Recorded and Mixed by – John Kelton
- Assistant Engineer – Matt Rovey
- Mastered By – Hank Williams at MasterMix, Nashville, TN
- Production Coordinator – Jason Campbell
- A&R Coordinator – John Ozier
- Graphic Design – Lee Wright Creative

== Chart performance ==
During the album's debut week, it sold approximately 32,000 units which was a record for Walker.

=== Weekly charts ===
Chart (2007)	Peak position
U.S. Billboard Top Country Albums	5
U.S. Billboard 200	15

=== End of year charts ===
Chart (2007)	Year-end 2007
US Billboard Top Country Albums	60
Chart (2008)	Year-end 2008
US Billboard Top Country Albums	71
