= One, Two, I Love You =

Single by Clay Walker

from the album Rumor Has It
- Released: April 1997
- Genre: Country
- Length: 3:06
- Label: Giant
- Songwriters: Ed Hill, Bucky Jones
- Producers: James Stroud; Clay Walker

Clay Walker singles chronology
"Rumor Has It" (1997)	"One, Two, I Love You" (1997)	"Watch This" (1997)

"One, Two, I Love You" is a song written by Ed Hill and Bucky Jones, recorded by American country music singer Clay Walker. It was released in April 1997 as the second single from the album Rumor Has It.

The song was Walker's thirteenth single release, as well as his thirteenth Top Twenty hit on the Billboard country singles charts.

== Content ==
The song is about male narrator who has been in love with his female lover since they were in kindergarten together and he uses the nursery rhymes they learned together to show he loves her now that they are older and still in love.

== Critical reception ==
Rick Mitchell of the Houston Chronicle wrote, "With its sweet sentiment, cute rhyme and catchy melody, it sounds like a can't-miss smash." The Dallas Morning News gave the song a negative review writing, "One, Two, I Love You, is a silly, badly written, midtempo cut that proves nursery rhymes are strictly for kids. With a chorus that reads "One, two, I miss you/Three, four, I walk the floor/Five, six, come back quick/I don't want to miss you no more," it sounds like palatable country aimed at the lowest common denominator."

Mike Joyce of The Washington Post also gave the song a negative review by writing, "The cloying kindergarten romance "One, Two, I Love You" doesn't qualify as a classic dud, it comes awfully close."

== Music video ==
A music video was filmed for this song and premiered in May 1997. It was directed by Bill Young.

== Chart positions ==
"One, Two, I Love You" is Walker's thirteenth Top 40 single on the Billboard country singles charts. The song spent nineteen weeks on the charts, peaking at number 18 on the chart week of July 12. It also peaked at number 12 on the RPM Country Tracks charts in Canada.

=== Charts ===
Chart (1997)	Peak position
Canada Country Singles (RPM)	12
US Hot Country Songs (Billboard)	18
