= Jesus Was a Country Boy =

Single by Clay Walker

from the album A Few Questions
- Released: July 5, 2004
- Genre: Christian Country
- Length: 4:02
- Label: RCA Nashville
- Songwriters: Rivers Rutherford; Clay Walker
- Producers: Jimmy Ritchey; Clay Walker

Clay Walker singles chronology
"I Can't Sleep" (2004)	"Jesus Was a Country Boy" (2004)	"'Fore She Was Mama" (2006)

"Jesus Was a Country Boy" is a song co-written and recorded by American country music singer Clay Walker. It was released in July 2004 as the third and final single from his album A Few Questions. It peaked at #31 on the Billboard Hot Country Singles & Tracks in 2004. The song was written by Walker and Rivers Rutherford.

== Background ==
In an interview with CMT, Walker stated "Jesus Was a Country Boy" was meant to be twofold—tongue-in-cheek for one, but there is a pretty deep meaning to it. The song is written in a more light-hearted way. I feel like people get so confused and wrapped up in religious doctrine that sometimes a person can lose what the meaning is—if that makes any sense. We get so wrapped up in the doctrine of laws that we lose what the true meaning is, and that is to love your neighbor as yourself. That is kind of what this song is really about. It is more a Sermon-on-the-Mount song."

Walker told Country France, "The material that was given to me to record is very different soundly. I wrote a few of the songs, I actually wrote a song called “Jesus Was A Country Boy”, it's very different, kind of a bold statement."

== Content ==
The male narrator explains that Jesus was a country boy because of the lifestyle Jesus lived which he compares to that of a "country boy".

== Critical reception ==
Dan MacIntosh of Country Standard Time wrote "Walker is equally inept at theology, as this album's title track fails to help explain why bad things happen to good people, and "Jesus Was A Country Boy" isn't going to bring in any new converts." Cheryl Harvey Hill of Country Stars Online wrote that the song has "A very powerful old message is conveyed in a melodic, refreshing, new way."

== Chart positions ==
For the week of July 10, 2004, the song debuted at #55. "'Jesus Was a Country Boy" is Walker's twenty-fifth Top 40 single on the Billboard country singles charts. The song peaked at #31 on the chart week of September 25.

=== Charts ===
Chart (2004)	Peak position
US Hot Country Songs (Billboard)	31
