= Bury the Shovel =

Single by Clay Walker

from the album Hypnotize the Moon
- Released: September 16, 1996
- Genre: Country
- Length: 3:27
- Label: Giant
- Songwriters: Chris Arms, Chuck Jones
- Producer: James Stroud

Clay Walker singles chronology
"Only on Days That End in "Y"" (1996)	"Bury the Shovel" (1996)	"Rumor Has It" (1997)

"Bury the Shovel" is a song written by Chris Arms and Chuck Jones, and recorded by American country music singer Clay Walker. It was released in September 1996 as the fourth and final single from his album Hypnotize the Moon.

The song is Walker's eleventh single release, as well as his eleventh top twenty hit on the Billboard country singles charts.

== Critical reception ==
Larry Flick of Billboard described the song "There is almost a swampy mooodiness to the melody, yet the production is brisk and the production taut. A sure bet to perk up programmer's ears".

== Chart positions ==
"Bury the Shovel" is Walker's eleventh top 40 single on the Billboard country singles chart. The song spent 18 weeks on the chart, peaking at number 18 on the chart week of November 16. It also peaked at number 24 on the RPM Country Tracks chart in Canada.

=== Charts ===
Chart (1996)	Peak position
Canada Country Singles (RPM)	24
US Hot Country Songs (Billboard)	18
