= She Likes It in the Morning =

Single by Clay Walker

from the album Fall
- Released: January 29, 2008
- Genre: Country
- Length: 3:50
- Label: Asylum-Curb
- Songwriters: Clay Walker, M. Jason Greene
- Producer: Keith Stegall

Clay Walker singles chronology
"Fall" (2007)	"She Likes It in the Morning" (2008)	"She Won't Be Lonely Long" (2009)

"She Likes It in the Morning is the title of a country music song written by Clay Walker and M. Jason Greene. It was recorded by American singer Clay Walker on his 2007 album Fall album and released as the album's third and final single.

The song is Walker's twenty-ninth single release on the Billboard country singles charts. However, it was his only his second single to miss the top forty.

== Background ==
Walker stated in the website Nashville Hype that She Likes It in the Morning is "A song that’s playful and at the same time says that a woman needs to know that she’s the most important thing in your life. A woman wants to be treated like a queen. She wants to know that she is absolutely everything to you. That’s what this song is basically saying. It’s a ballad and it really reminds me of some of the stuff that I grew up listening to and loved–some of the early George Strait stuff and even a touch of some Conway Twitty in there and Earl Thomas Conley. It just has that late 80′s feel to it and I love that."

In an interview with Country Weekly Walker said, "I was in Flagstaff, Arizona, and came up with that idea. I wrote it with a good friend of mine, Jason Greene. It has that real traditional sound to it, but at the same time it’s very modern. The song itself is a sweet song, and it’s one of those that I feel like women and men both get. It’s masculine enough for men to like and tender enough for women. The title makes people pay attention a little bit. It’s definitely got a little shock factor to it. It can seem a little risqué at the beginning, but it’s not. It’s a tongue-in-cheek thing. As soon as you hear the second line you get it. That’s the fun of writing, and the art of writing—the fact that you can lead somebody one way, then go another.”

When asked about writing songs, Walked said, "As a writer, I really look for deep feelings inside myself to write about. You can learn how to write creatively with literature and study. You can even call it a craft as some writers do. It’s like a movie, if it isn’t something that is hitting you in a deep place and causing you to have emotions than its probably not going to do that in other people. So, when I’m writing, the things that inspire me are real emotions."

== Content ==
The song is about how the male narrator and his female lover show their love for each other.

== Reception ==
Matt C of Engine 145 gave the song a thumbs down rating. He criticized the song's title as potential to hurt the song's success, "When I read “She Like it in the Morning,” the first thing that came to mind was something a lot less polite than what Walker's crooning about. “She Likes it in the Morning” says nothing more than “we love each other,” and how many times have we heard it done better?" Kevin John Coyne of Country Universe gave the song a B+ rating, "“She Likes it in the Morning” is executed far too well to be dismissed as radio filler, and Walker's performance is what makes it work."

== Chart positions ==
"She Likes It in the Morning" debuted at #59 during the week of January 26, 2008. The song spent sixteen weeks on the charts, peaking at #43 on the chart week of April 5, 2008.

=== Charts ===
Chart (2008)	Peak position
US Hot Country Songs (Billboard)	43
