= A Few Questions =

Studio album by Clay Walker
- Released: September 9, 2003
- Recorded: 2003
- Studio: The Sound Mountain, Nashville; Emerald Entertainment, Nashville; Ocean Way, Nashville; The Money Pit, Nashville; Blackbird, Nashville; Loud Studios, Nashville
- Genre: Country
- Length: 49:30
- Label: RCA Nashville
- Producer: Jimmy Ritchey; Clay Walker

Clay Walker chronology
Christmas (2002)	A Few Questions (2003)	Fall (2007)

Singles from A Few Questions
- 1. "A Few Questions" Released: April 28, 2003; 2. "I Can't Sleep" Released: January 5, 2004; 3. "Jesus Was a Country Boy" Released: July 5, 2004

A Few Questions is the seventh studio album by American country music singer Clay Walker. It was released September 9, 2003. The album reached #23 on Billboard magazine's album chart. Released from this album were the singles "A Few Questions" and "I Can't Sleep", both of which reached Top Ten on the Hot Country Songs charts. "Jesus Was a Country Boy" reached #31 on the same chart. This was also Walker's only studio album for the RCA label, after Giant Records closed its doors in 2001.

In March 2020, Walker announced a re-release of the album. The album was re-released on March 27, 2020, by RCA Nashville.

"I Can't Forget Her" was recorded and released by Dierks Bentley on his 2009 album Feel That Fire.

== Background ==
In an interview with the Houston Chronicle, Walker stated about the album, "There's no safety net in this music, I’m dangerous right now because I feel I've got nothing to lose. I'm coming out swinging." In an interview with The Arizona Daily Star Walker said, "I feel like it is by far the most important album of my career, this is without a question the best record I've ever made. Everything just clicked for me in the studio, everywhere. It clicked in looking for the songs. The photo shoot went great. It just seemed like everything fell in place. It seemed natural."

In another interview prior to the album's release, Walker mentioned, "I think I enjoy myself even more now and I realize that it's important to make great music, the best you can, it's what the fans deserve." Walker mentioned in an interview with Country Weekly, "This is the most introspective album I've ever made. It really gives people a good look at me - and what I'm thinking. I'm so proud of this record. I've had apprehensions on previous albums. I was fearful that people wouldn't like certain songs. I can honestly say I have no fears about any song on this CD. All of them fit me really well and there's not one thing I would do differently on any song. The album is absolutely the best I can do at this point in my life. I feel like I'm singing better than I ever have. There's a lot of maturity and strength in my voice."

Walker told The Dallas Morning News, "I love soul music, one of my favorite songs of all time is Earl Thomas Conley's 'Holding Her and Loving You.' I recorded that on my Live, Laugh, Love album. That was the beginning of me finding myself in the studio. This record captures that. It embodies it from beginning to end. It's not just one song this time. I finally made a record that I can look back on and say I wouldn't change a ... thing. The lyrics are part of who I am. I really can't think of many lines in these songs that don't fit me." Walker told Country France, "The RCA album is by far the most diverse album that I’ve ever made and it gives people a really good look at what I’m about. I think this album probably symbolizes me best. This album is very special." He also stated, "In the new RCA album there’s a lot of emotion and a lot of my heart went into this album and it’s something that I think I’ll look back on in 10, 20 years and say, “I’m really proud of that particular one”. And you hope that each album you make is better than the last, but this one would definitely make a statement. It will be different from the albums that we made before in some ways. There are some songs that I think will definitely get a rise out of people."

During another interview with Country Weekly Walker stated, "I've had a great ride, but by no means do I feel like I'm finished. I've got a lot to prove. Great quarterbacks don't get good until their seventh or eighth year. So this is my seventh album. I'm thinking, 'Hey, I know the plays, I know the defenses -- I can throw it deep if I want to!" Walker also said, "The wolves will always eat the weak ones. But they better bring a big damn plate if they're gonna eat me!"

== Track listing ==
No.	Title	Writer(s)	Length
1.	"A Few Questions"	Adam Wheeler, Phillip Moore, Ray Scott	3:46
2.	"Everybody Needs Love"	John Rich, Josh Leo	3:43
3.	"Sweet Sun Angel"	Greg Barnhill, Kris Bergsnes, Jeremy Stover	3:41
4.	"Jesus Was a Country Boy"	Clay Walker, Rivers Rutherford	3:17
5.	"I Can't Sleep"	Walker, Chely Wright	4:02
6.	"Coming Back Again"	Gordon Kennedy, Wayne Kirkpatrick, Keith Urban	3:22
7.	"Heaven, Leave the Light On"	Trey Bruce, Cory Mayo	4:00
8.	"I'm in the Mood for You"	Rutherford	3:41
9.	"When She's Good, She's Good"	Robert Boyd, Rutherford	3:33
10.	"This Is What Matters"	Casey Beathard, James LeBlanc	3:34
11.	"Countrified"	Kip Raines, Jeffrey Steele	3:34
12.	"I Don't Want to Know"	Kim Tribble, Tammy Hyler	4:47
13.	"I Can't Forget Her"	Bart Butler, Mark Rone, Frank Solesbee	4:23

== Critical reception ==
Professional ratings
Review scores
Source	Rating
About.com	favorable
AllMusic	2.5/5 stars
Country Standard Time	negative
Dallas Morning News	B+
Grand Rapids Press	2.5/5 stars
People Magazine	2.5/5 stars
St. Louis Post-Dispatch	mixed
USA Today	2/5 stars

Ralph Novak of People Magazine gave the album 2 and a half stars and wrote "The singer ponders a bit too much for his own good." Stephen Thomas Erlewine of AllMusic gave the album a mixed review writing " A Few Questions is a great success, but at its core, it just doesn't feel like a Clay Walker album, even if it is likely the start of the second phase of Walker's career, the phase where he is no longer a new traditionalist and is now an unabashed radio guy."

Mandy Davis of the St. Louis Post-Dispatch also gave the album a mixed review writing, "Walker picks some solid material that meshes well with his twangy voice on songs such as "I'm in the Mood for You" and "I Don't Want to Know." But with 13 cuts on the CD, mediocre tracks such as "Sweet Sun Angel" and "Heaven Leave the Light On" drag the album down. USA Today gave the album two stars out of five and wrote "With his track record of hits, why can't this guy find better material?" Jack Leaver of The Grand Rapids Press gave the album two and a half stars and wrote "As Walker begins what appears to be a second phase of his career, longtime fans will welcome him back, and the singer should pick up a few new ones on the way."

About.com gave the album a positive review and wrote, "It's been a while since Clay has been on top of the charts, and with the songs from "A Few Questions," I think that's just where we'll be seeing him once more." Dan MacIntosh of Country Standard Time gave the album a negative review and wrote, "Before putting this release out, Walker's people should have given him a few more musical challenges. As it stands, "A Few Questions" finds Clay Walker sleep walking through a series of dreamy, yet unmemorable, tracks." Mario Tarradell of The Dallas Morning News gave the album a B+ rating and wrote, "He's stretching vocally during a batch of songs that explore spirituality, the limits of love and the simple life. Tried-and-true subjects, but Mr. Walker's committed vocal performances help keep them fresh and passionate. A Few Questions plays like Mr. Walker has most of the answers." Editors at CMT wrote, "Is the record any good? Yeah, it sure is, in that polished, radio-ready, crowd-pleasing kind of way. But even that approach is easy to screw up. Of course, no comeback is complete without a rambunctious song about country life, which in this case would be "Countrified."

== Personnel ==
As listed in liner notes.

=== Musicians ===
- Tim Akers – keyboards
- Eric Darken – percussion
- Chris Dunn – trombone
- Shannon Forrest – drums
- Paul Franklin – steel guitar
- David Grissom – electric guitar
- Aubrey Haynie – fiddle, mandolin
- Jim Horn – baritone saxophone, horn arrangement
- Kirk "Jelly Roll" Johnson – chromatic harp
- Samuel B. Levine – tenor saxophone
- B. James Lowry – acoustic guitar
- Brent Mason – electric guitar
- Steve Patrick – trumpet
- Jimmy Ritchey – acoustic guitar, gut string guitar, nylon string guitar, electric guitar, mandolin, banjo
- Leland Sklar – bass guitar
- Clay Walker – lead vocals
- Biff Watson – acoustic guitar
- Jonathan Yudkin – fiddle, mandolin, banjo, cello, harp, viola, violin

=== Background vocalists ===
- Lisa Cochran
- Melodie Crittenden
- Wes Hightower
- John Wesley Ryles

=== Production ===
- Recorded By: Derek Bason and Clarke Schleicher
  - Assisted By: David Bryant, Scott Kidd, Rich Hanson, Eric Hellerman, Chris Ashburn and Leslie Richter
- Additional Recording By: Rich Hanson at Loud Studios, Nashville, TN and Dan Workman at Sugar Hill Studios, Houston, TX
- Mixed By: Clarke Schleicher at Loud Studios
  - Assisted By: Rich Hanson and Jake Burns
- Digital Editing By: Jake Burns, Christopher Rowe and Eric Hellerman
- Mastered By: John Mayfield at Mayfield Mastering
- Production Coordinator: Mike "Frog" Griffith for The Sessions Agency
- Art Direction: Shane Tarleton
- Design: S. Wade Hunt
- Photography: Sandra Johnson, Russ Harrington

== Chart performance ==
=== Weekly charts ===
Chart (2003)	Peak position
France SNEP Albums Top 150	134
U.S. Billboard Top Country Albums	3
U.S. Billboard 200	23

=== Year-end charts ===
Chart (2003)	Position
US Billboard Top Country Albums	74
Chart (2004)	Position
US Billboard Top Country Albums	63
