= Hypnotize the Moon =

Studio album by Clay Walker
- Released: October 17, 1995
- Recorded: 1995
- Studios: Nashville TN, Loud Recording, 50 Music Square West, 16th Avenue Sound, Sound Stage Studio, 10 Music Circle South
- Genre: Country
- Length: 35:51
- Label: Giant
- Producer: James Stroud

Clay Walker chronology
If I Could Make a Living (1994)	Hypnotize the Moon (1995)	Rumor Has It (1997)

Singles from Hypnotize the Moon
- 1. "Who Needs You Baby" Released: September 12, 1995; 2. "Hypnotize the Moon" Released: January 8, 1996; 3. "Only on Days That End in "Y"" Released: May 27, 1996; 4. "Bury the Shovel" Released: September 16, 1996

Hypnotize the Moon is the third studio album by American country music singer Clay Walker. It was released October 17, 1995, on Giant Records. It was the third consecutive album of his career to earn RIAA platinum certification for U.S. shipments of one million copies, although it was also the first album of his career not to produce any Number One hits. Released from this album were, in order: "Who Needs You Baby", the title track, "Only on Days That End in 'Y'", and "Bury the Shovel". Respectively, these reached #2, #2, #5, and #18 on the Billboard Hot Country Songs charts. "Love You Like You Love Me" was co-written by Steve Wariner, who later recorded it on his 1998 album Burnin' the Roadhouse Down.

== Background ==
In an interview with the Houston Chronicle Walker stated about the album "I'm not trying to change country music; I want to be part of it, country music radio has really been the key for us. They've been behind us from the beginning, especially in this area." During an interview with The Grand Rapids Press Walker said, "The third album has to be a landmark album for us. It has to take me to the next level." He also stated, "I know for sure that this is the best album I've ever done. I'm just so proud of it."

Walker told Country Song Roundup, "The first album, I had a lot of very raw sound and it was a new beginning for me. The second album I stretched out of that one and tried to find my limitations. This album is something that I'm going to be proud of 20 years from now." In a press release for the album Walker stated, "I really wanted this album to be more traditional country than anything I've ever done. That's why I wrote and looked for songs that were more in that vein." In another interview with Country Song Roundup Walker said, "I try to record music that is going to be played on the radio twenty years from now. It's hard to make songs stand out with so many artists and songs out there."

== Critical reception ==
Professional ratings
Review scores
Source	Rating
AllMusic	4/5 stars
Entertainment Weekly	B+
USA Today	2/5 stars

The editors at Billboard wrote in their review of the album "Walker is a big-voiced Texas singer with smart song selection and a minimalist honky-tonk production. He sounds unassuming until you realize that's what he's all about. He gets in your yard without ever getting in your face. Very intelligent use of fiddle and steel here." Helen Thompson of Texas Monthly wrote, "Hypnotize the Moon, is already flying out of stores. Attribute his success to a knack for writing mainstream country songs or to his engaging modesty--or even to his tight blue jeans, which he wears in his sexy videos and onstage."

Stephen Thomas Erlewine of AllMusic wrote, " Walker shines on both polished, contemporary ballads and gritty traditional country, and his consistently excellent performance is what carries the album over the weak spots." David Zimmerman of USA Today gave the album two stars and wrote, "The follow-up to Walker's successful debut album, If I Could Make a Living, doesn't have as much verve or as many catchy hooks. But Walker's workmanlike approach and believable delivery give emotional heft to the waltz." Alanna Nash of Entertainment Weekly gave the album a B+ rating and wrote that Walker is "only as memorable as his songs, and in this case, that's enough. Whether you favor the Haggardesque Let Me Take the Heartache (Off Your Hands) or the MOR title ballad, he's one cookie-cutter sensation who isn't likely to crumble.

Richard McVey II of Country Standard Time gave the album a positive review and wrote, "Be prepared for an abundance of fiddle and steel guitar on an album that will no doubt continue Walker's string of platinum success." Mario Tarradell of The Dallas Morning News said, "His third album, Hypnotize the Moon, is filled with the same type of radio-friendly ballads and mass-appeal up-tempo numbers that took his first two CDs to platinum."

== Commercial performance ==
Hypnotize the Moon debuted at number 11 on the US Top Country Albums chart and number 57 on the Billboard 200, selling 20,000 units on its first week. It stayed at the Billboard 200 charts for 34 consecutive weeks and 69 weeks inside its country albums chart.

== Track listing ==
No.	Title	Writer(s)	Length
1.	"Who Needs You Baby"	Clay Walker, Kim Williams, Randy Boudreaux	2:48
2.	"I Won't Have the Heart"	Walker, Williams, Kent Blazy	2:54
3.	"Let Me Take the Heartache (Off Your Hands)"	Walker, Williams, Blazy	3:17
4.	"Hypnotize the Moon"	Eric Kaz, Steve Dorff	3:39
5.	"Hand Me Down Heart"	Zack Turner, Lonnie Wilson	3:06
6.	"Only on Days That End in "Y""	Richard Fagan	2:46
7.	"Where Were You"	Tim Mensy	3:46
8.	"Loving You Comes Naturally to Me"	Ray Methvin, Tim Johnson, Roger Springer	3:24
9.	"Bury the Shovel"	Chris Arms, Chuck Jones	3:27
10.	"A Cowboy's Toughest Ride"	Walker, Williams, Boudreaux	3:12
11.	"Love Me Like You Love Me"	Steve Wariner, Bill LaBounty	3:42

== Personnel ==
- Eddie Bayers - drums
- Larry Byrom – acoustic guitar
- Mike Brignardello – bass guitar
- Stuart Duncan – fiddle
- Paul Franklin – Dobro
- Kyle Frederick – acoustic guitar
- Sonny Garrish – steel guitar
- Johnny Gimble - fiddle
- John Hobbs - piano
- Byron House – bass guitar
- Dann Huff - electric guitar
- Van Rentz – piano
- Jason Roberts – fiddle
- Matt Rollings – piano
- Brent Rowan – electric guitar
- Maxwell Schauf — drums
- Tim Sergeant – steel guitar
- Joe Spivey – fiddle
- Landon Taylor – electric guitar
- Clay Walker – lead vocals
- Glenn Worf – bass guitar
- Curtis Wright - background vocals
- Curtis Young - background vocals

Strings performed by the Nashville String Machine, contracted by Carl Gorodetzsky, conducted and arranged by Steve Dorff.

== Chart performance ==
=== Weekly charts ===
Chart (1995)	Peak position
U.S. Billboard Top Country Albums	10
U.S. Billboard 200	57

=== Certifications ===
Country	Certification
United States	Platinum
Canada	Gold
