= If I Could Make a Living =

Studio album by Clay Walker
- Released: September 27, 1994
- Recorded: 1994
- Studio: Loud Recording (Nashville)
- Genre: Country
- Length: 36:19
- Label: Giant
- Producer: James Stroud

Clay Walker chronology
Clay Walker (1993)	If I Could Make a Living (1994)	Hypnotize the Moon (1995)

Singles from I Could Make a Living
- 1. "If I Could Make a Living" Released: September 13, 1994; 2. "This Woman and This Man" Released: December 13, 1994; 3. "My Heart Will Never Know" Released: April 25, 1995

If I Could Make a Living is the second studio album by American country music singer Clay Walker, released in 1994 on Giant Records. Similar to his self-titled debut album, this album was certified platinum by the RIAA. It produced the singles "If I Could Make a Living", "This Woman and This Man", and "My Heart Will Never Know", which respectively reached #1, #1, and #16 on the Hot Country Songs charts.

== Background ==
In a telephone interview with Tulsa World Walker said, "I approached the second [album] a little bit differently from the first one, because it's kind of like scuba diving, the first time, you're down there at the bottom, and it's a little bit dirty, so you have to feel around a lot before you can find the treasure. For the second one, the water was a little more clear." He also said, "The only thing I try to do is just look for good songs, and not worry about what kind they are. I think if you do that, it does two things: It gets you some hits on radio, and it gives the listener a little variety."

In an interview with The Plain Dealer Walker said, "Speaking of the `sophomore jinx,' I've got the `sophomore jitters.' I hope my second album does as well as the first album. I think I've progressed some as a singer and performer since the first one, but they (the buying public) have to like what's on the album itself if they're going to buy it." He also stated, " On the first album, I'd been writing for years and had all my best work to pick from ... That's one thing I've missed, not being able to write on the road. I went home for two weeks and wrote three songs for this album." Walker told the Boca Raton News, about his success of his albums and said, "It's really because of radio. They'll play music they think is good. I'm flattered to be considered one of the artists they like."

After the album's release, Walker stated, "I'll be honest, the second album could have been stronger, but with the success we've had, I know we avoided the sophomore jinx. I just felt really pressed when selecting songs for the entire album." In an interview with The Dallas Morning News, Walker said, "In the early '80s and maybe even the late '80s it was an artist-driven business. You probably weren't taken seriously if you weren't over 35 years old. Now, it's a song-driven format. You still have to go out there and hit a home run with every single you release. There are so many artists out there that do mediocre material but can sing. And it doesn't matter how good you sing, how many notes you can hit, how high or how low you can go, you have to make people believe what you're singing. You can't fool the public all the time. It makes me buckle down and try to find the best music I can find. I don't take any chances. I'm not looking for one-hit wonders or that gimmick record. I want growth. I want it to take a steady climb."

In an interview with Bankrate when asked about if the lyrics to the song "Money Ain't Everything" represent a longing for a more simple life Walker responded "Well, I feel blessed everyday for what God has given me. I think I appreciate every show more than I used to because I know it could be taken from me. But part of the song -- "What good is first place when you're in a rat race ... money ain't everything," means I have tried to remain true to myself and be completely honest as a recording artist and a man. Everything that has happened to me over the last several years gave me a newfound courage."

== Track listing ==
No.	Title	Writer(s)	Length
1.	"If I Could Make a Living"	Keith Stegall, Roger Murrah, Alan Jackson	2:12
2.	"The Melrose Avenue Cinema Two"	Reese Wilson	3:01
3.	"My Heart Will Never Know"	Steve Dorff, Billy Kirsch	3:24
4.	"What Do You Want for Nothin'"	Keith Follesé, Michael Woody	3:28
5.	"This Woman and This Man"	Jeff Pennig, Michael Lunn	4:23
6.	"Boogie Till the Cows Come Home"	Clay Blaker, Roger Brown	3:27
7.	"Heartache Highway"	Kim Williams, Clay Walker, Kent Blazy	3:19
8.	"You Make It Look So Easy"	Tom Shapiro, Chris Waters	3:10
9.	"Lose Your Memory"	Walker	2:48
10.	"Money Ain't Everything"	Williams, Walker, Blazy	3:47
11.	"Down by the Riverside"	Williams, Walker, Blazy	3:40

== Critical reception ==
Professional ratings
Review scores
Source	Rating
Allmusic	link
Dallas Morning News	(favorable)
Ottawa Citizen	(mixed)
Rocky Mountain News	B+

Chris Rimlinger of Rocky Mountain News gave the album a B+ rating and wrote "This sophomore project, while not quite as satisfying as his first one, reinforces his credibility as an up-and-coming major player. Walker has written and chosen material that treat old themes in new ways. And his vocal intensity carries them all off. Susan Beyer of The Ottawa Citizen gave the album a mixed review and wrote, " At times, he sounds a little too congested, especially when he sings ballads written by others. But when he gets into a Texas swing on his own he's fine. What Do You Want For Nothing stands out for its tougher sentiments and sound. Occasionally, he heads for Garth Brooks territory in story songs that try to make a mountain out of a molehill of emotion. Mario Tarradell of The Dallas Morning News wrote, "If I Could Make A Living, offers a slightly more inventive batch of tunes (excluding the by-the-numbers title cut) than his first record."

== Personnel ==
As listed in liner notes.

- Eddie Bayers – drums^{1}
- Larry Byrom – acoustic guitar, electric guitar
- Glen Duncan – fiddle
- Stuart Duncan – fiddle, mandolin
- Paul Franklin – steel guitar, Dobro
- Sonny Garrish – steel guitar
- Jim Horn – saxophone
- Dann Huff – electric guitar
- Mark Ivey – background vocals
- Paul Leim – drums^{2}
- Brent Mason – electric guitar
- Terry McMillan – harmonica
- Steve Nathan – keyboards
- Michael Rhodes – bass guitar^{2}
- Matt Rollings – piano
- Brent Rowan – electric guitar^{2}
- Clay Walker – lead vocals
- Dennis Wilson – background vocals
- Glenn Worf – bass guitar^{1}
- Curtis Young – background vocals

Notes

- ^{1}Performed on all tracks except for "Lose Your Memory"
- ^{2}Performed only on "Lose Your Memory"

== Charts and certifications ==
=== Weekly charts ===
Chart (1994–1995)	Peak position
Canadian Albums (RPM)	58
Canadian Country Albums (RPM)	1
US Billboard 200	42
US Top Country Albums (Billboard)	4

=== Year-end charts ===
Chart (1995)	Position
US Billboard 200	130
US Top Country Albums (Billboard)	21

=== Singles ===
Year	Single	Peak chart positions		
Year	Single	US Country	US	CAN Country
1994	"If I Could Make a Living"	1	73	1
1995	"This Woman and This Man"	1		2
1995	"My Heart Will Never Know"	16		6

=== Certifications ===
Country	Certification
United States	Platinum
Canada	Gold
