= Ordinary People (Clay Walker song) =

Single by Clay Walker

from the album Greatest Hits
- B-side: "Next Step Is Love"
- Released: May 5, 1998
- Recorded: 1998
- Genre: Country
- Length: 3:49
- Label: Giant
- Songwriters: Ed Hill, Craig Wiseman
- Producer: James Stroud

Clay Walker singles chronology
"Then What?" (1998)	"Ordinary People" (1998)	"You're Beginning to Get to Me" (1998)

"Ordinary People is a song written by Ed Hill and Craig Wiseman, and recorded by American country music singer Clay Walker. It was released in May 1998 as the first single from his Greatest Hits compilation album.

The song is Walker's sixteenth single release, as well as his sixteenth Top forty hit on the Billboard country singles charts. However, it was his lowest charting single at the time of its release as well as his first single to miss the top twenty.

== Content ==
The song describes how "ordinary people have extraordinary love." The narrator compares ordinary people to famous people.

== Critical reception ==
Larry Flick of Billboard gave the song a positive rating "Cynics might be quick too dismiss the lyrics as being to syrupy. However, it's a sentiment that country music's core audience can relate to. Walker teams with James Stroud for production that is understated, while Walker turns in a plaintive, heartfelt performance."

== Chart positions ==
"Ordinary People" is Walker's sixteenth Top 40 single on the Billboard country singles charts. The song spent nineteen weeks on the charts, peaking at number 35 on the chart week of July 4. It also peaked at number 22 on the RPM Country Tracks charts in Canada.

=== Charts ===
Chart (1998)	Peak position
Canada Country Singles (RPM)	22
US Bubbling Under Hot 100 (Billboard)	20
US Hot Country Songs (Billboard)	35
