= Love Trip (Jerry Kilgore album) =

Studio album by Jerry Kilgore
- Released: September 21, 1999
- Studio: Emerald Studio
- Genre: Country
- Label: Virgin Records
- Producer: Steve Bogard; Jeff Stevens; Scott Hendricks

Jerry Kilgore chronology
Love Trip (1999)	Loaded & Empty (2008)

Love Trip is the debut studio album by American country music singer Jerry Kilgore. It was released on September 21, 1999, through Virgin Records.

== Content ==
Love Trip charted three singles on the Billboard Hot Country Songs charts: "Love Trip" spent 20 weeks on the charts in late 1999, peaking at number 36. After it came "The Look" at number 49, and "Cactus in a Coffee Can" at number 73. Reba McEntire later covered "Cactus in a Coffee Can" on her 2019 album Stronger Than the Truth.

== Critical reception ==
Professional ratings
Review scores
Source	Rating
AllMusic	3/5 stars

William Ruhlmann of AllMusic stated that the album "has been so carefully calibrated to current commercial notions of Nashville success that its real strengths are nearly obscured." He thought that "All Hell's Breakin' Loose" and "Cactus in a Coffee Can" were the strongest songs for showing the most country sound.

== Track listing ==
No.	Title	Writer(s)	Length
1.	"I Just Want My Baby Back"	Jerry Kilgore; Ted Hewitt	2:58
2.	"Love Trip"	Kilgore; Brett Jones; Gil Grand	3:20
3.	"The More I Love You"	Kilgore; Jeff Stevens; Steve Bogard	3:37
4.	"All I've Got to Say"	Paul Overstreet; Rob Crosby; Jim Collins	3:11
5.	"It's Dangerous With You on My Mind"	Kilgore; Stevens; Bogard	3:44
6.	"Don't Tell Me You're Not in Love"	Tony Colton; Kim Williams; Bobby Wood	3:33
7.	"All Hell's Breakin' Loose"	Kilgore	2:50
8.	"The Look"	Tim Nichols; Stevens	3:23
9.	"If a Man Ain't Thinking ('Bout His Woman)"	Kilgore; Debbie Cochran; Buddy Brock	2:55
10.	"Lonesome Love List"	Kilgore; Wil Nance; Hewitt	2:20
11.	"The Real Thing"	Stevens; Bogard; Scott Borchetta	3:18
12.	"Cactus in a Coffee Can"	Steve Seskin; Allen Shamblin	3:53
Total length:			39:02

== Musicians ==
- Jerry Kilgore: Vocals
- Eddie Bayers: Drums
- Mike Brignardello: Bass
- Glenn Worf: Bass (tracks 1, 9, 11)
- Brent Rowan: Electric Guitar
- Brent Mason; Electric Guitar (tracks 1, 9, 11)
- Biff Watson: Acoustic Guitar
- Matt Rollings: Piano
- Jimmy Nichols: Piano (tracks 2, 4, 5, 6, 8)
- Sonny Garrish: Steel Guitar
- Paul Franklin: Steel Guitar (tracks 1, 9, 11)
- Larry Franklin: Fiddle
- Rob Hajacos: Fiddle (tracks 1, 9)
- Carl Marsh: Fairlight (tracks 3, 12)
- Wes Hightower: Background Vocals

== Production ==
- Producer: Steve Bogard
- Producer: Jeff Stevens
- Producer: Scott Hendricks
- Recorded by: John Guess
- Recording Assistant: Patrick Murphy
- Additional Recording by: John Kinz
- Additional Recording Assistant: Mike Hanson
- Engineer: John Guess
- Engineer Assistant: Patrick Murphy
- Engineer Assistant: Chris Rowe
- Mastered by: Hank Williams at Mastermix
- Production Coordinator: Kelly Giedt

All track information and credits were taken from the CD liner notes.
