= Christmas (Clay Walker album) =

Studio album by Clay Walker
- Released: September 10, 2002
- Genre: Country, Christmas
- Length: 39:48
- Label: Warner Bros. Nashville
- Producer: Jim Ed Norman

Clay Walker chronology
Say No More (2001)	Christmas (2002)	A Few Questions (2003)

Christmas is the first Christmas album by American country music singer Clay Walker. It was released September 10, 2002, on Warner Bros. Records. It features Walker's renditions of various Christmas songs. "Blue Christmas" and "Feliz Navidad" both charted on the Hot Country Songs charts from Christmas airplay.

== Background ==
Walker told Country France, "The Christmas album we just made should be coming out right now. The thing I like about it so much is all of the songs are standards. No written, new material. I would rather personally sing along to a standard myself. So I just put myself in other people’s place. The thing I like the most about it is that it has orchestra, strings, horns, real orchestra, its costs a lot of money to make."

== Track listing ==
No.	Title	Writer(s)	Length
1.	"Silent Night/Away in a Manger"	Franz Xaver Gruber, Joseph Mohr, James R. Murray	3:41
2.	"Mary, Did You Know?"	Buddy Greene, Mark Lowry	4:50
3.	"O Come All Ye Faithful"	Frederick Oakeley, John Francis Wade	3:39
4.	"Go Tell It on the Mountain"	Traditional	3:03
5.	"I'll Be Home for Christmas"	Buck Ram, Kim Gannon, Walter Kent	3:50
6.	"Rudolph the Red-Nosed Reindeer"	Johnny Marks	3:12
7.	"Winter Wonderland"	Felix Bernard, Dick Smith	3:29
8.	"Please Come Home for Christmas"	Charles Brown, Gene Redd	5:11
9.	"Frosty the Snowman"	Walter E. Rollins, Steve Edward Nelson	2:43
10.	"White Christmas"	Irving Berlin	3:33
11.	"Feliz Navidad"	José Feliciano	2:37

== Personnel ==
- David Angell – violin
- Monisa Angell – violin
- Janet Askey – violin
- Sam Bacco – chimes, cymbals, marimba, orchestra bells, percussion, sleigh bells, timpani, xylophone
- Eddie Bayers – drums, percussion
- Mike Bradley – engineer, mixing
- Mark Capps – production assistant
- Mark Casstevens – acoustic guitar
- Lisa Cochran – choir
- Ernie Collins – bass trombone
- Travis Cottrell – choir, background vocals
- Jackie Cusic – choir
- David Davidson – violin
- Tim Davis – choir
- Mark Douthit – saxophone
- Connie Ellisor – violin
- Jane Escueta – violin
- Christopher Farrell – viola
- Kim Fleming – choir, background vocals
- Steve Gibson – acoustic guitar, electric guitar
- Carl Gorodetzky – concert master, violin
- Allen Green – children's voices
- Barry Green – trombone
- Jim Grosjean – viola
- Marshall Hall – choir, background vocals
- Stephanie Hall – choir
- Vicki Hampton – choir, background vocals
- Mike Haynes – flugelhorn, trumpet
- Aubrey Haynie – fiddle
- David Hoffner – keyboards, programming
- Jim Horn – baritone saxophone
- David Hungate – bass guitar
- Mark Ivey – choir, background vocals
- Jack Jezzro – bass guitar
- Marabeth Jordan – choir
- Danny Kee – production assistant
- Lee Larrison – violin
- Chris McDonald – trombone
- Anthony LaMarchina – cello
- Joey Miskulin – accordion
- Doug Moffitt – piccolo, saxophone
- Cate Myer – violin
- The Nashville String Machine – strings
- Steve Nathan – keyboards, piano
- Craig Nelson – bass
- Jim Ed Norman – producer
- Gary Van Osdale – viola
- Mary Kathryn Van Osdale – violin
- Steve Patrick – trumpet
- Linda Patterson – french horn
- Carole Rabinwitz-Neuen – cello
- Gary Robinson – choir
- Lisa Silver – choir
- Oliver Silver – children's voices
- Pamela Sixfin – violin
- Betty Small – violin
- Dennis Solee – clarinet
- Liz Stewart – bass
- Julie Tanner – cello
- Joe Tassi – production assistant
- Bobby G. Taylor – french horn, oboe
- Simon Taylor – children's voices
- George Tidwell – trumpet
- Alan Umstead – viola
- Catherine Umstead – violin
- Cindy Richardson Walker – choir
- Clay Walker – lead vocals
- Bergen White – string arrangements, string conductor
- Kris Wilkinson – viola
- Hank Williams – mastering
- Dennis Wilson – choir
- Karen Winkelmann – violin
- Clare Yang – viola

== Critical reception ==
Professional ratings
Review scores
Source	Rating
About.com	(favorable)
Allmusic	3/5 stars
Chicago Sun Times	2/5 stars
Cincinnati Post	(favorable)
Country Standard Time	(favorable)
Denver Post	(favorable)
USA Today	(favorable)

Editors at The Cincinnati Post wrote "You might not be able to pick Clay Walker out of a lineup of second-tier country singers, but don't overlook this CD. Producer Jim Ed Norman paid careful attention to instrumentation, expertly meshing oboe, harp and everything else at his disposal with Walker's toned-down twang. Highlights include a heartfelt "Mary Did You Know" and a spirited "Go Tell It on the Mountain" with hand- clapping gospel choir and funky organ." Editors at USA Today wrote, "Walker sounds like a cowboy on some tracks, a crooner on others -- and he also displays rarely heard R&B and Mexican influences." The Denver Post printed, "Simple, straightforward takes on 'Rudolph the Red-Nosed Reindeer, 'Please Come Home for Christmas,' and 'Frosty the Snowman' stand out on a CD that also contains good versions of 'Go Tell It on the Mountain,' 'Mary Did You Know' and 'O Come All Ye Faithful.' Walker ends it with a bang- up, toe-tapping version of 'Feliz Navidad.'"

Bobby Reed of The Chicago Sun Times gave the album 2 1/2 stars out of five and wrote, "Clay Walker is an odd candidate for recording a Christmas album, given his vocal limitations. There are some inspired moments in this straightforward collection, including a mid-song recitation in "Mary Did You Know" and the bright brass riffs that enliven "Feliz Navidad." Throughout the disc, however, the harmony singers fail to seamlessly mesh with Walker's lead vocals." Editors at About.com gave the album a favorable review writing "If you're a Clay Walker fan, you'll want to pick this up. If you're looking for traditional Christmas music, you'll find it here. Not much out of the ordinary here, but an adequate album." Brian Wahlert of Country Standard Time gave the album a positive review and said, "Although he doesn't always succeed here, the highlights are gratifying, and Walker should be applauded for taking a risk."

== Chart performance ==
=== Weekly charts ===
Chart (2002)	Peak position
U.S. Billboard Top Country Albums	54
