= My Heart Will Never Know =

Single by Clay Walker

from the album If I Could Make a Living
- B-side: "Money Ain't Everything"
- Released: April 25, 1995
- Recorded: 1994
- Genre: Country
- Length: 3:24
- Label: Giant
- Songwriters: Steve Dorff; Billy Kirsch
- Producer: James Stroud

Clay Walker singles chronology
| "This Woman and This Man" (1995) | "My Heart Will Never Know" (1995) | "Who Needs You Baby" (1995) |

"My Heart Will Never Know" is a song written by Steve Dorff and Billy Kirsch, and recorded by American country music artist Clay Walker. It was released in May 1995 as the third and final single from his album If I Could Make a Living. It peaked at number 16 in the United States and number 6 in Canada.

== Critical reception ==
Larry Flick of Billboard gave the song a positive review writing "One of the brightest stars in country music's new wave, Walker is batting 1.000 at radio. He delivers one of his best-ever vocal performances, conveying all the heartbreak of this well-written ballad's lyric." Sonia Murray of the Atlanta Constitution wrote "My Heart Will Never Know," has enough pop inflection to make it appealing to young listeners who grew up on recent rock 'n' roll. They'll also grab concertgoers who've switched from rock to country as they've grown older.

== Music video ==
The music video was directed by Bill Young and premiered in mid-1995.

== Chart positions ==
"My Heart Will Never Know" debuted at number 66 on the U.S. Billboard Hot Country Singles & Tracks for the week of May 6, 1995.

=== Charts ===
| Chart (1995) | Peak position |
|---|---|
| Canada Country Singles (RPM) | 6 |
| US Hot Country Songs (Billboard) | 16 |
