= 'Fore She Was Mama =

Single by Clay Walker

from the album Fall
- Released: October 16, 2006
- Genre: Country
- Length: 3:43
- Label: Asylum-Curb
- Songwriters: Casey Beathard; Phil O'Donnell
- Producer: Keith Stegall

Clay Walker singles chronology
"Jesus Was a Country Boy" (2004)	"'Fore She Was Mama" (2006)	"Fall" (2007)

"'Fore She Was Mama" is a song written by Casey Beathard and Phil O'Donnell, and recorded by American country music singer Clay Walker. It was released on October 16, 2006, as the first single from his album Fall. It peaked at #21 on the Billboard Hot Country Singles & Tracks in 2007. It was also his first chart entry since "Jesus Was a Country Boy" in 2004.

== Background ==
In an interview with the Associated Press, Walker revealed, "It's great when a song can be humorous without being hokey, and the writers made a good country song without it being a novelty. Anytime we do it, it gets a huge reaction. I think a lot of moms are looking in the rearview mirror saying, 'I hope the kids aren't looking at my face right now, because I'm blushing."

== Content ==
The singer tells a first-person account of when he was ten years old and found a "box of forget-me-nots" in his parents' closet. The box was filled with pictures of his mother partaking in various 1960s activities, including hanging out with hippies, riding motorcycles, and smoking marijuana, the latter of which was censored by some radio stations. When his mother finds out that her box has been spotted, she burns it, but that does not stop her children from reminding her about her past.

== Critical reception ==
In a review of Walker's album "Fall", The Associated Press described "'Fore She Was Mama" as having "Just the right balance of humor and drama. Kevin John Coyne of Country Universe described the song as "Funny as hell" Shelly Fabian of About.com gave the song a favorable rating by writing "Clay does ballads so well, but he also can rock out the mid-tempo songs, like this one. It's got a really catchy chorus that will stick in your head."

The website New Country Star called it "A fun and funny little song" and also wrote "The lyrics aren't your usual CW style, but the voice is incredibly classic Clay." Stephen Thomas Erlewine of AllMusic in his review of "Fall" called "'Fore She Was Mama" "wry" and "funny". The editors at USA Today said the song is "slightly creepy, but it also feels true to life. Walker is at his best at moments like that."

== Music video ==
A music video was created for the song, it was directed by Roman White.

== Chart positions ==
This song debuted at #56 on the U.S. Billboard Hot Country Singles & Tracks chart dated September 23, 2006. "'Fore She Was Mama" is Walker's twenty-sixth Top 40 single on the chart. The song peaked at #21 on the chart week of February 24, 2007.

=== Charts ===
Chart (2006–2007)	Peak position
US Hot Country Songs (Billboard)	21
US Bubbling Under Hot 100 (Billboard)	16
