= You're Beginning to Get to Me =

1998 single by Clay Walker

Single by Clay Walker

from the album Greatest Hits
- B-side: "Lose Your Memory"
- Released: August 25, 1998
- Recorded: 1998
- Genre: Country
- Length: 2:41
- Label: Giant
- Songwriters: Aaron Barker, Tom Shapiro
- Producer: James Stroud

Clay Walker singles chronology
"Ordinary People" (1998)	"You're Beginning to Get to Me" (1998)	"She's Always Right" (1999)

"You're Beginning to Get to Me" is a song written by Tom Shapiro and Aaron Barker, and recorded by American country music singer Clay Walker. Released in August 1998, it was the second and final single from his Greatest Hits compilation album. The song peaked at number 2 on the Billboard Hot Country Singles & Tracks chart (now knowns as Hot Country Songs).

== Critical reception ==
Tara Seetharam of Country Universe listed "You're Beginning to Get to Me" as the 302nd best country single of the 1990s and wrote, "In his catalogue of fabulous 90s hits, this understated “love” song gets overshadowed by some of the more distinct ones, but it’s nonetheless memorable."

== Chart performance ==
The song debuted at number 63 on the Hot Country Singles & Tracks chart dated August 22, 1998. It charted for 27 weeks on that chart, and peaked at number 2 on the chart dated January 2, 1999 (having been blocked from Number One by Terri Clark's "You're Easy on the Eyes", another song co-written by Tom Shapiro.) In addition, it entered the Top 40 on the Billboard Hot 100, where it peaked at number 39 on that chart.

=== Charts ===
Chart (1998–1999)	Peak position
Canada Country Singles (RPM)	7
US Billboard Hot 100	39
US Hot Country Songs (Billboard)	2

=== Year-end charts ===
Chart (1999)	Position
US Country Songs (Billboard)	56
