= If You Ever Feel Like Lovin' Me Again =

Single by Clay Walker

from the album Say No More
- Released: June 25, 2001
- Genre: Country
- Length: 3:53
- Label: Warner Bros. Nashville
- Songwriters: Jeff Stevens, Steve Bogard, Jerry Kilgore
- Producers: Blake Mevis, Clay Walker

Clay Walker singles chronology
"Say No More" (2001)	"If You Ever Feel Like Lovin' Me Again" (2001)	"A Few Questions" (2003)

"'If You Ever Feel Like Lovin' Me Again" is a song written by Jeff Stevens, Steve Bogard and Jerry Kilgore, and recorded by American country music singer Clay Walker. It was released in June 2001 as the second and final single from his album Say No More. It peaked at number 27 on the Billboard Hot Country Singles & Tracks. Walker called it his favorite song on the album.

== Chart positions ==
"'If You Ever Feel Like Lovin' Me Again" debuted at number 50 on the U.S. Billboard Hot Country Singles & Tracks for the week of July 14, 2001. The song is Walker's twenty-fifth Top 40 single on the Billboard country singles charts. The song peaked at number 27 for the week of November 3 and spent twenty weeks on the chart.

=== Charts ===
Chart (2001)	Peak position
US Hot Country Songs (Billboard)	27
