= Clay Walker =

American country musician

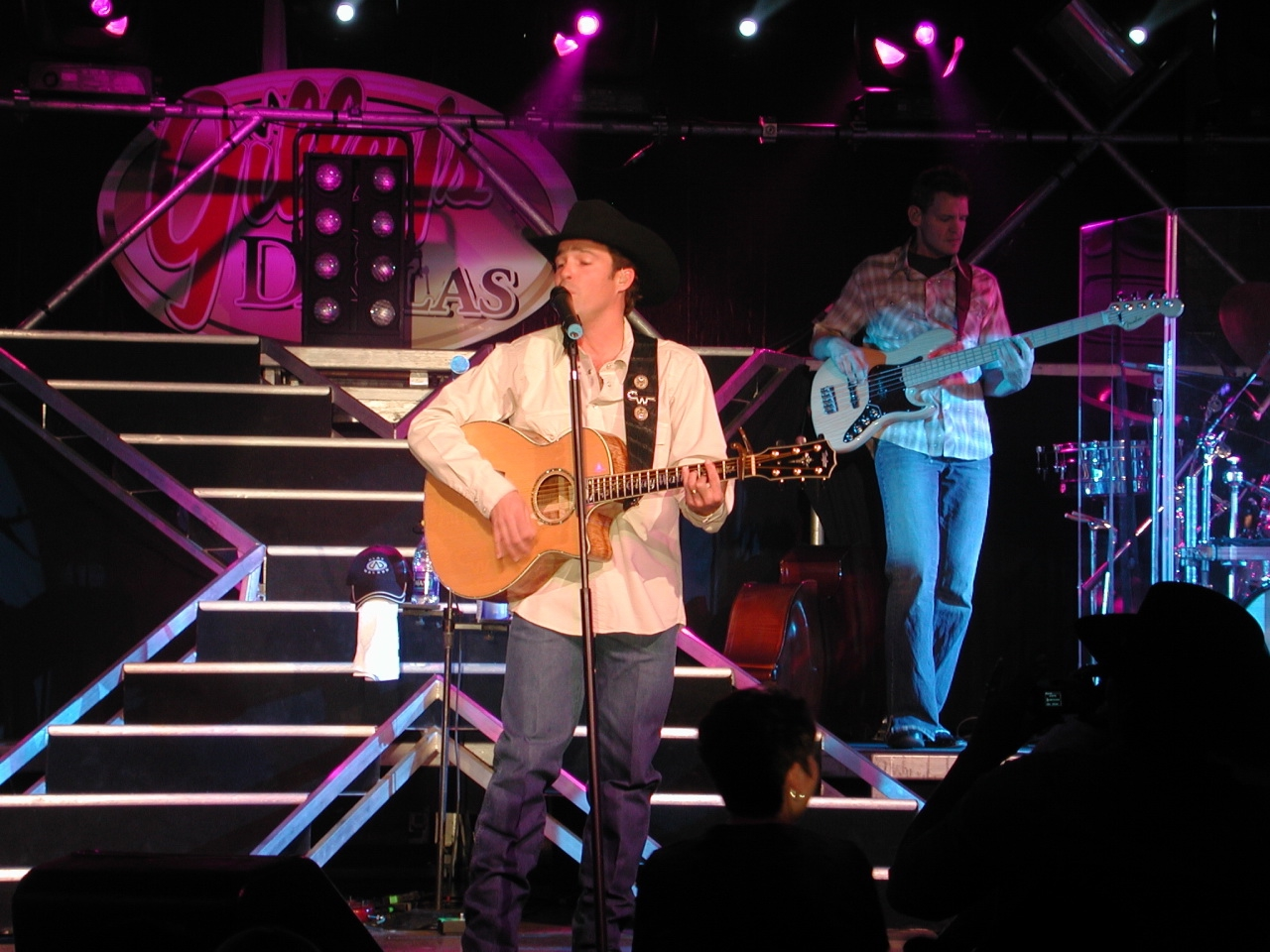
- Walker performing in Dallas, Texas

Background information
- Born: Ernest Clayton Walker Jr. August 19, 1969 (age 57); Beaumont, Texas, U.S.
- Origin: Vidor, Texas, U.S.
- Genres: Country
- Occupations: Singer; Songwriter
- Instruments: Vocals, guitar
- Years active: 1993–present
- Labels: Giant; Warner Bros.; RCA; Asylum-Curb; Maven; Show Dog Nashville; Thirty Tigers
- Website: www.claywalker.com

Ernest Clayton Walker Jr. (born August 19, 1969) is an American country music artist. He made his debut in 1993 with the single "What's It to You", which reached Number One on the Billboard Hot Country Singles & Tracks (now Hot Country Songs) chart, as did its follow-up, 1994's "Live Until I Die". Both singles were included on his self-titled debut album, released in 1993 via Giant Records. He stayed with the label until its 2001 closure, later recording for Warner Bros. Records, RCA Records Nashville, and Curb Records.

Clay Walker has released a total of eleven studio albums, including a greatest hits package and an album of Christmas music. His first four studio albums all achieved platinum certification in the United States and his greatest hits collection and fifth studio album were each certified gold. He has charted more than thirty singles on Hot Country Songs, of which six have reached number one: "What's It to You", "Live Until I Die", "Dreaming with My Eyes Open", "If I Could Make a Living", "This Woman and This Man", and "Rumor Has It".

== Biography ==
Ernest Clayton Walker Jr. was born on August 19, 1969, in Beaumont, Texas, to Ernest and Danna Walker. The oldest of five children, Walker lived in Vidor with his mother and stepfather. His father, Clay Sr., gave him a guitar when he was nine years old. Walker began entering talent competitions at age 15. After leaving his shift as nighttime desk clerk at a Super 8 Motel, he stopped at a local radio station to deliver a tape of a song that he had written. Although the morning disc jockey told him that the station's policies prohibited playing self-submitted tapes, he played Walker's song and said that it was "too good to pass up."

After graduating from Vidor High School in 1986, Walker began working at a Goodyear Tire and Rubber Company plant. At 19, he also began touring as a musician, playing various local clubs and eventually finding work as the house singer at a bar in Beaumont called the Neon Armadillo. In November 1992, he was discovered by James Stroud, a record producer who was also the president of Warner Music Group subsidiary Giant Records.

== Musical career ==
=== 1993–94: Clay Walker ===
Walker released his self-titled debut album in 1993 under Stroud's production. Its first single was "What's It to You"; written by Robert Ellis Orrall and Curtis Wright, this song reached No. 1 on the Billboard Hot Country Singles & Tracks (now Hot Country Songs) charts and number 73 on the Billboard Hot 100. Its followup "Live Until I Die" (which Walker wrote), was released late in the year and became his second consecutive No. 1 in early 1994. After those two singles came the number 11 "Where Do I Fit in the Picture", which was originally the B-side of "What's It to You." The album accounted for a third No. 1 hit in "Dreaming with My Eyes Open", a song that was also featured on the soundtrack to the 1993 film The Thing Called Love. An additional cut from the album, "White Palace," charted at number 67 on the country charts without being released as a single.

Clay Walker was certified platinum by the Recording Industry Association of America for shipments of one million copies. It peaked at number 8 on Top Country Albums, number 2 on Top Heatseekers and number 52 on the Billboard 200. Larry Powell of Allmusic gave the album a four-and-a-half star rating, saying that Walker had a "high-energy" voice reminiscent of Conway Twitty. Walker also received two award nominations in 1994: Favorite Country New Artist from the American Music Awards and Top New Male Vocalist from the Academy of Country Music, as well as a nomination in 1995 at the TNN/Music City News Country Awards for Male Star of Tomorrow.

=== 1994–96: If I Could Make a Living and Hypnotize the Moon ===
If I Could Make a Living was the title of Walker's second album, released in 1994. It produced two more No. 1 singles in the title track (co-written by Alan Jackson, Keith Stegall, and Roger Murrah) and 1995's "This Woman and This Man". The latter song spent two weeks at No. 1, becoming his first multi-week No. 1 hit. Then came the number 16 "My Heart Will Never Know". If I Could Make a Living went platinum in May 1995, reaching number 2 on the country albums chart. Gordon Ely of the Richmond Times-Dispatch gave a favorable review, saying that "Walker has broken loose from Nashville's most recent crop of carefully crafted cowboys." Walker also began touring in 1995 as a headlining act, in support of the album.

Late in 1995, Walker released his third studio album, titled Hypnotize the Moon. Although none of its singles reached No. 1, Hypnotize the Moon produced two consecutive number 2 hits in "Who Needs You Baby" (which Walker co-wrote) and the title track, followed by the number 5 "Only on Days That End in 'Y'" and the number 18 "Bury the Shovel". Hypnotize the Moon was certified platinum in 1996, making for Walker's third consecutive platinum album. This album received a four-star rating from Stephen Thomas Erlewine, who said that it was his "most assured, cohesive album to date" and that he gave a "consistently excellent performance." Alanna Nash of Entertainment Weekly thought that Walker did not show a distinct musical personality, but considered the song selection strong and gave it a B+. Richard McVey II of Country Standard Time considered it a "throwback" in sound to Walker's debut, while USA Today said that it lacked the "verve" of that album.

=== 1996–97: Rumor Has It ===
Having just completed the tracks for his fourth album in 1996, Walker was playing basketball with a friend, when he began to experience numbness, facial spasms, and double vision. Magnetic resonance imaging revealed that he had multiple sclerosis (MS). Walker subsequently began changing his diet and treating the disease with a daily injection of Copaxone, sending his MS into an arrested state.

Also in early 1996, Nu Millennia Media released Self Portrait, which included five of Walker's songs in an interactive CD-ROM format and 30 minutes of video footage. He then released his fourth album, 1997's Rumor Has It, which he co-produced with Stroud. Its title track, the first single, became his sixth and final No. 1 single that year. Other singles from the album included the number 18 "One, Two, I Love You" and the Top 5 hits "Watch This" and "Then What?" at number 4 and number 2, respectively. The latter also reached number 65 on the Hot 100, making for his first entry on that chart since "What's It to You." As with his three previous studio albums, Rumor Has It was certified platinum. Larry Stephens of Country Standard Time gave this album a mostly-negative review, calling the songs "cookie-cutter" outside "I Need a Margarita". Thom Owens of Allmusic also thought that it was formulaic, but said that Walker was "able to make even mediocre material sound good", rating it three stars out of five.

=== 1998–2000: Greatest Hits and Live, Laugh, Love ===
In April 1998, Walker charted with a live rendition of Earl Thomas Conley's 1983 single "Holding Her and Loving You". This rendition spent nine weeks on the charts and peaked at number 68. One month later, he debuted his sixteenth single, "Ordinary People". Peaking at number 35, it was one of two new songs included on his Greatest Hits album; the other new track, "You're Beginning to Get to Me", made its debut in August 1998 and peaked at number 2 on the country chart and number 39 on the Hot 100 in January 1999, the same month in which Greatest Hits was certified gold. Also in 1998, Walker performed a sold-out show at the Houston Livestock Show and Rodeo.

Doug Johnson, who succeeded Stroud as Giant Records' president, produced Walker's 1999 album Live, Laugh, Love. Regarding its production and promotion, the label's senior director of marketing Connie Baer said that she wanted to raise Walker's profile as an artist, as both she and Johnson thought that he did not have the same level of recognition as other artists with similar album sales and chart success. This album was led off by the number 16 country and number 74 pop hit "She's Always Right", which was co-written by Lonestar's lead singer Richie McDonald. After this song came the title track at number 11 country and number 65 pop. "The Chain of Love", written by Rory Lee Feek and Jonnie Barnett, was the album's third and most successful single, reaching number 3 country and number 40 on the Hot 100. Both it and "Once in a Lifetime Love", the fourth single, first charted from unsolicited airplay received while "Live, Laugh, Love" was climbing the charts. "Once in a Lifetime Love", upon its release, became his lowest-peaking single release, reaching number 50. The album also included a studio version of the Earl Thomas Conley cover.

Erlewine gave the album three stars on Allmusic, where he wrote that it "never really distinguishes itself from its predecessors" but "has its moments." Brian Wahlert of Country Standard Time also thought that the album was inconsistent, saying that "She's Always Right", "The Chain of Love", and the Conley cover were its strongest tracks, but that the rest "treads no new ground." Deborah Evans Price of Billboard was more favorable, saying that it showed the energy of his live shows, and that he "cut loose" with soul singing on "This Time Love."

In late 2000, Walker recorded two tracks on Believe: A Christmas Collection, a multi-artist Christmas music album released by Giant. These two tracks — a cover version of Elvis Presley's "Blue Christmas" and the original song "Cowboy Christmas" — both made appearances on the country chart, reaching number 51 and number 70, respectively.

=== 2001–02: Say No More and Christmas ===
Walker released his twenty-third single, "Say No More", for Giant in early 2001. It was the first single release (and the title track) from his sixth studio album, peaking at number 33 on the country chart; the only other single, the Jerry Kilgore co-write "If You Ever Feel Like Lovin' Me Again", reached number 27. The latter song was promoted by Giant's parent company, Warner Bros. Records Nashville, as Giant had closed in late 2001. Walker co-produced the album with veteran producers Byron Gallimore and Blake Mevis, and session guitarist Brent Mason. The album also included a song that Walker wrote in high school, and a cover of Ritchie Valens's "La Bamba." Maria Konicki Dinoia of Allmusic rated it three stars, with her review saying that "the sensitivity on this album is so expressive that it makes you want to run right out and hug the one you love." Country Standard Time critic Mike Clark considered it a transition to a more country pop-oriented sound, describing the album as being "full of bad lyrics and overwrought production clichés."

In 2002, Walker wrote and recorded a song for the National Football League's expansion team, the Houston Texans. Titled "Football Time in Houston," the song was used as the team's official fight song during its inaugural season. In an interview with CMT, he said that he donated the song to the city of Houston, and that he sings "The Star-Spangled Banner" at the team's opening game every season.

Although he had left Warner Bros. for RCA Records' Nashville division in May 2002, Warner Bros. released a Christmas music album entitled Christmas in September of the same year. It included a cover of José Feliciano's "Feliz Navidad", which Walker took to number 49 on the country chart in January 2003.

=== 2003–04: A Few Questions ===
Walker's first single release for RCA, "A Few Questions", debuted in April 2003. The song spent twenty-seven weeks on the country charts and peaked at number 9, making for his first top ten entry since "The Chain of Love" three years previous. This was the first single from his only RCA album, also titled A Few Questions, which he produced with Jimmy Ritchey. Its second single, "I Can't Sleep," which Walker co-wrote with Chely Wright, also peaked at number 9 in early 2004. The third and final single was the number 31 "Jesus Was a Country Boy", which Walker wrote with Rivers Rutherford. A Few Questions accounted for his second-highest peak on the country albums charts, reaching number 3.

Erlewine rated this album two-and-a-half stars out of five on Allmusic. He considered the album more country pop-oriented than Walker's work for Giant, saying that this change in sound made it not "feel like a Clay Walker album." Dan McIntosh gave a mostly-negative review for Country Standard Time, where he wrote that "even his passionate singing cannot rise above this album's predictable lyrics and lame arrangements."

=== 2005–08: Fall ===
Walker was signed his third record deal in July 2005, this time with the Asylum-Curb division of Curb Records. His first single for the label, "'Fore She Was Mama," reached a peak of number 21 in March 2007. It was included on his album Fall, which was produced by Keith Stegall. The album's title cut, "Fall," was written by Clay Mills along with former Mercury Records artist Shane Minor and former Exile member Sonny LeMaire. It was the second single release from Fall, going to number 5 on the country charts and number 55 on the Hot 100. The album's third and final single was "She Likes It in the Morning", with a number 43 country peak. Fall also included a duet with Freddy Fender, the first duet of Walker's career, on a cover of Fender's debut single "Before the Next Teardrop Falls." Walker and Fender recorded this duet in early 2006; Fender died of lung cancer in October of the same year.

Erlewine gave a three-and-a-half star rating, saying that Stegall's production gave it a more traditional sound in comparison to A Few Questions, and that, despite having some "sappy" songs, it was his "most enjoyable collection in some time." Engine 145 reviewer Brady Vercher rated it three stars out of five, praising Walker's vocal performance but saying that the song selection "seemed to be lacking in everything but fluff." Country Standard Time reviewer Jeffrey B. Remz wrote that Walker showed "a very pleasant country voice with a good sense of emotion" and that the production was more country-sounding than most mainstream acts, but said that it had several "generic" songs.

=== 2009–2014: She Won't Be Lonely Long and Best Of Clay Walker ===
Walker's second album for Asylum-Curb was first announced in June 2009. Its first single, "She Won't Be Lonely Long", was given an official release date of December 2009, although it had already entered the country charts in late November. In advance of his ninth album, Walker released an extended play titled She Won't Be Lonely Long. The album, also titled She Won't Be Lonely Long, was released on June 8, 2010. It includes a cover of Alabama's 1980 single "Feels So Right" with a backing vocal from Alabama's lead singer, Randy Owen. Allmusic reviewer Thom Jurek praised the album for its "straight-up, mainstream contemporary country" sound but said that it did not reflect a change in sound from Fall.

"She Won't Be Lonely Long" peaked at number 4 on the country chart in mid-2010. The album's second single, "Where Do I Go from You", was released to radio on August 2, 2010, with "Like We Never Said Goodbye" following in late 2011. The album's fourth single, "Jesse James" was released in 2012 under Curb's Sidewalk Records imprint. In 2014, Curb issued a compilation titled The Best of Clay Walker, which included singles from Fall and She Won't Be Lonely Long, along with re-recordings of songs from when he was on Giant.

=== 2015–2019: Long Live the Cowboy ===
In November 2015, Walker released a new single entitled "Right Now". Despite a recording hiatus, Walker continued to perform infrequently between 2015 and 2017. Much of his length between releases was due to lingering effects of multiple sclerosis. On April 13, 2018, Walker released the second single titled "Working On Me" from his then still unconfirmed album. During a live blog on his social media sites on December 21, 2018, Walker announced that he would be releasing a song titled "She Gets What She Wants" at midnight on December 24. During the live blog Walker also stated that the album would be titled Long Live the Cowboy and it would be released in January 2019. Long Live the Cowboy was finally released independently in January 2019, and it includes the singles previously released.

=== 2020–2021: Texas to Tennessee ===
In August 2020, Walker signed with Show Dog Nashville, and announced that his first single for the label, "Need a Bar Sometimes", would be released on August 14, 2020. In February 2021, "Need a Bar Sometimes" charted at number 59 on the Billboard Country Airplay chart, becoming Walker's first chart entry in more than 8 years. Walker's eleventh studio album, Texas to Tennessee, was released by Show Dog Nashville in July 2021.

== Musical image and influences ==
In 1994, Bob Cannon of Entertainment Weekly wrote that Walker's image of a "Resistol hat, sturdy cowpoke face, and very tight jeans" seemed to be from a "Country Music Handbook for Success," but also said that he "ignores the danger of being dismissed as just another hunk in a hat." Walker has been compared to Mark Chesnutt and Tracy Byrd, both of whom are also Beaumont, Texas, natives who began their careers shortly before Walker did. Of the comparison among the three, Rick Koster wrote in the book Texas Music that Walker's success came more quickly than that of Chesnutt or Byrd. Kurt Wolff and Orla Duane, authors of Country Music: The Rough Guide, said that he "had loads of youthful energy, a golden Texas twang, and, of course, plenty of boyish good looks." They also called his music "relatively tame" but said that "his Texas bar-room roots remain clearly visible in his voice and songs." Regarding Walker's onstage persona, former Warner Bros. executive Bill Mayne told Billboard magazine in 1997 that Walker has "maintained a low profile" but that he "really touches people and connects."

Walker described his voice to CMT as "raspy [and] rugged." He cites George Jones (also a Beaumont native) as a primary influence, as well as James Taylor and Bob Seger; he has also said that, because he grew up in a largely African-American neighborhood, his singing style was influenced by rhythm and blues music. In addition, he said that after his diagnosis, he realized that "you need to love your family" and said that, because he considered his songs positive in nature, he felt that he could connect to younger listeners.

== Personal life ==
Before the release of his first single, Walker married a rodeo queen named Lori Jayne Lampson. They had two daughters: MaClay DaLayne, born on January 14, 1996; and Skylor ClayAnne, born on May 14, 1999. The couple divorced in 2006. He married model Jessica Craig on September 28, 2007 and had five more children with her: a son named William Clayton, born August 5, 2008; a daughter named Mary Elizabeth, born December 27, 2009; and two more sons Elijah Craig and Ezra Stephen, born November 4, 2017. On August 7, 2020, it was announced that Walker and his wife would be welcoming a fifth child together, a son named Christiaan Michael, born January 2021.

Walker has participated in several forms of charity to help raise awareness of multiple sclerosis following his diagnosis in 1996, including his own non-profit charity, Band Against MS, which he founded in 2003. In 2008, he received a Humanitarian Award for his charitable efforts in relation to MS and participated in a charity golf tournament benefiting his organization.

== Discography ==
=== Studio albums ===
- Clay Walker (1993)
- If I Could Make a Living (1994)
- Hypnotize the Moon (1995)
- Rumor Has It (1997)
- Live, Laugh, Love (1999)
- Say No More (2001)
- A Few Questions (2003)
- Fall (2007)
- She Won't Be Lonely Long (2010)
- Long Live the Cowboy (2019)
- Texas to Tennessee (2021)

=== Number-one singles ===
- "What's It to You" (1 week, 1993)
- "Live Until I Die" (1 week, 1994)
- "Dreaming with My Eyes Open" (1 week, 1994)
- "If I Could Make a Living" (1 week, 1994)
- "This Woman and This Man" (2 weeks, 1995)
- "Rumor Has It" (2 weeks, 1997)

== Awards and nominations ==
=== American Music Awards ===
Year	Nominee / work	Award	Result
1994	Clay Walker	Favorite Country New Artist	Nominated

=== TNN/Music City News Country Awards ===
Year	Nominee / work	Award	Result
1995	Clay Walker	Male Star of Tomorrow	Nominated

=== Academy of Country Music Awards ===
Year	Nominee / work	Award	Result	Ref.
1994	Clay Walker	Top New Male Vocalist	Nominated	
1994	"What's It to You"	Single Record of the Year	Shortlisted	
1995	Clay Walker	Top Male Vocalist of the Year	Shortlisted	
2000	Clay Walker	Top Male Vocalist of the Year	Shortlisted	

== Honors ==
Year	Honor	Reference
2015	Inducted into the Texas Cowboy Hall of Fame	
