= Daily News (Kingsport, Tennessee) =

Tennessee newspaper

The Daily News of Kingsport, Tennessee was a daily newspaper in Tennessee. It began publishing regularly in 1971 as a daily. Publication ceased in 2016.
