= Who Needs You Baby =

Single by Clay Walker

from the album Hypnotize the Moon
- B-side: "Where Were You"
- Released: September 12, 1995
- Recorded: 1995
- Genre: Country
- Length: 2:48
- Label: Giant
- Songwriters: Clay Walker; Kim Williams; Randy Boudreaux
- Producer: James Stroud

Clay Walker singles chronology
"My Heart Will Never Know" (1995)	"Who Needs You Baby" (1995)	"Hypnotize the Moon" (1996)

"Who Needs You Baby" is a song co-written and recorded by American country music artist Clay Walker. It was released in September 1995 as the lead-off single to his album Hypnotize the Moon. It peaked at #2 in both the United States and Canada. The song was written by Walker, Kim Williams and Randy Boudreaux.

== Critical reception ==
Larry Flick of Billboard gave the song a positive review writing "It boasts a catchy chorus, lots of steel, and Walker's enjoyable delivery. Country radio readily embraces Walker, and this solid effort should give them lots to be happy about."

== Music video ==
The music video features kids and people at a movie theater watching Clay Walker in an old black-and-white-themed movie titled "The Singing Cowboy". It was directed by Steven T. Miller and R. Brad Murano. The video was filmed at the Plaza Theatre in Carrollton, Texas and on a ranch near Santa Fe, New Mexico. It peaked at #1 on CMT's Top 12 Countdown (now CMT's Top 20 Countdown) in 1995. The music video also received a "Special Jury Award" at Worldfest Houston in 1996.

== Live performances ==
Walker performed "Who Needs You Baby" with the 350 member University of Texas marching band at half time of the University of Texas/University of Oklahoma game at the Cotton Bowl on October 14, 1995.

== Chart positions ==
=== Charts ===
Chart (1995)	Peak position
Canada Country Singles (RPM)	2
US Bubbling Under Hot 100 (Billboard)	20
US Hot Country Songs (Billboard)	2

=== Year-end charts ===
Chart (1995)	Position
Canada Country Tracks (RPM)	72
