= Rumor Has It (Clay Walker album) =

Studio album by Clay Walker
- Released: April 8, 1997
- Recorded: 1996; Nashville, TN
- Genre: Country
- Length: 31:42
- Label: Giant
- Producers: James Stroud; Clay Walker

Clay Walker chronology
Hypnotize the Moon (1995)	Rumor Has It (1997)	Greatest Hits (1998)

Singles from Rumor Has It
- 1. "Rumor Has It" Released: February 3, 1997; 2. "One, Two, I Love You" Released: April 1997; 3. "Watch This" Released: August 11, 1997; 4. "Then What?" Released: January 13, 1998

Rumor Has It is the fourth studio album by American country music singer Clay Walker. It was released April 8, 1997, on Giant Records. The album was certified platinum by the RIAA and reached #32 on the Billboard album charts. Singles released from it include the title track, "One, Two, I Love You", "Watch This", and "Then What?", which respectively reached #1, #18, #4, and #2 on the Hot Country Songs charts between 1997 and 1998.

== Background ==
In an interview with The Spokesman Review Walker stated "I wanted this album to be even more country. I felt the sounds on the records were beginning to get a little stock and sounded, to me anyway, predictable. I felt it needed to get back to a much more rural sound, like we had on my first album."

"Rumor Has It" was the first album Walker released after being diagnosed with multiple sclerosis. During an interview with CMT he stated, "The most important thing that I have learned is there are two things that really matter. The fans are personable, and they're not just a number. They really care about who you are. Like when I was diagnosed with MS, I saw a different side of country music than I ever realized was there. I thought it all was just a business. It's not that way at all. It's a family. Secondly, I learned that hit records are what makes the career. You have to have those hit records, and you have to find the best songs out there. Those are the two most important things -- be loyal to the fans because they're loyal to you, and to put out hit records. It's really that simple, and you can't have one without the other I don't think." Walker also said, "For me, I still feel like a newcomer. I think I'm just now starting to put out my best work; or I'm getting ready to. I've had a lot of experience with James Stroud in the studio, which makes me more comfortable in the studio. So album wise, I feel like I'm growing a lot."

== Track listing ==
No.	Title	Writer(s)	Length
1.	"Rumor Has It"	M. Jason Greene, Clay Walker	3:10
2.	"One, Two, I Love You"	Ed Hill, Bucky Jones	3:06
3.	"I'd Say That's Right"	Tim Nichols, Mark D. Sanders	2:51
4.	"Heart over Head over Heels"	Bob Regan, Jeff Pennig	2:53
5.	"Watch This"	Ron Harbin, Aaron Barker, Anthony L. Smith	3:10
6.	"You'll Never Hear the End of It"	Dickie Kaiser, Jon Robbin	2:56
7.	"Country Boy and City Girl"	Walker	3:58
8.	"I Need a Margarita"	Dana Hunt Black, Monty Holmes, Tony Mullins	3:16
9.	"That's Us"	Tim Mensy, Walker	3:19
10.	"Then What?"	Jon Vezner, Randy Sharp	3:03

== Critical reception ==
Professional ratings
Review scores
Source	Rating
Allmusic	3/5 stars
Billboard	(favorable)
Buffalo News	2/5 stars
Country Spotlight	(favorable)
Country Standard Time	(negative)
Dallas Morning News	(negative)
San Diego Union-Tribune	(negative)
Washington Post	(negative)

Mikel Toombs of The San Diego Union-Tribune gave the album a negative review writing, "An overactive arrangement and a mess of vocal mannerisms fail to hide the song's mundane nature. And Walker's singing also doesn't benefit "Country Boy and City Girl," a failed attempt at a Randy Travis weeper, although the utterly clichéd lyrics are even more deadly. To be fair, Walker is adept at snappy, sappy fare like "I'd Say That's Right" and "Heart Over Head Over Heels". But most of this CD's value remains in the foldout miniposter that backs the packaging." Buffalo News gave the album two stars and wrote, "I wish the man well, but his music just leaves me cold. Yes, he occasionally turns out a clever song like "One, Two, I Love You" from this set, but the man consistently does the unforgivable—he sings without soul." The Dallas Morning News gave the album a negative review writing the album "is Mr. Walker's poorest effort to date. Opening with the instantly forgettable title cut and closing with "Then What", a watered-down attempt at Jimmy Buffett-inspired calypso, Rumor Has It finds Mr. Walker abandoning all the promise that spurred his 1993 debut album for empty-headed mainstream pop.

Mike Joyce of the Washington Post gave the album a negative review by writing, "Walker's vocal talent isn't nearly impressive enough to overcome the hackneyed songwriting that keeps surfacing throughout the album." Paul Verna of Billboard said, "As one of the spiritual children of the George Jones school of hard-edged Southwestern country, he maintains the tradition of kick-ass up-tempo songs and solemn, hat-in-hand ballads. The world may not need another margarita song, but the one here is OK." Thom Owens of AllMusic wrote, "Rumor Has It may not be among his very best, yet there are enough strong moments to make it worthwhile for most fans." Larry Stephens of Country Standard Time gave the album a negative review and said, "Most of this is cookie cutter country, and Walker's voice doesn't add anything to the mix - it's just one of dozens that all sound the same." Marianne Horner of Country Spotlight gave the album a favorable review and wrote, "Rumor Has It presents Clay Walker in the basic, pure country style that kicked opened the doors for him four years ago, and made him a major force in country music today."

== Personnel ==
- Eddie Bayers – drums
- Bruce Bouton – steel guitar
- Larry Byrom – acoustic guitar
- Dan Dugmore – steel guitar
- Stuart Duncan – fiddle
- Paul Franklin – steel guitar
- Tim Mensy – acoustic guitar
- Steve Nathan – piano
- Tom Roady – percussion, steel drums
- Brent Rowan – electric guitar, acoustic guitar
- Tim Sargeant – steel guitar
- Joe Spivey – fiddle
- Wayne Toups – squeeze box
- Clay Walker – lead vocals
- Glenn Worf – bass guitar
- Curtis Wright – background vocals
- Curtis Young – background vocals

== Chart performance ==
During the album's debut week, it sold over 30,000 units.

=== Weekly charts ===
Chart (1997)	Peak position
Canadian Country Albums (RPM)	7
US Billboard 200	32
US Top Country Albums (Billboard)	4

=== Year-end charts ===
Chart (1997)	Position
US Billboard 200	191
US Top Country Albums (Billboard)	23
Chart (1998)	Position
US Top Country Albums (Billboard)	39

=== Certifications ===
Country	Certification
United States	Platinum
