= Hypnotize the Moon (song) =

Single by Clay Walker

from the album Hypnotize the Moon
- B-side: "A Cowboy's Toughest Ride"
- Released: January 8, 1996
- Genre: Country
- Length: 3:39
- Label: Giant
- Songwriters: Steve Dorff, Eric Kaz
- Producer: James Stroud

Clay Walker singles chronology
"Who Needs You Baby" (1995)	"Hypnotize the Moon" (1996)	"Only on Days That End in "Y"" (1996)

"Hypnotize the Moon" is a song written by Steve Dorff and Eric Kaz, and recorded by American country music singer Clay Walker. It was released in January 1996 as the second single and title track from Walker's CD Hypnotize the Moon. It peaked at #2 on the Billboard Hot Country Singles & Tracks (now Hot Country Songs) chart, behind "No News" by Lonestar.

== Critical reception ==
Larry Flick of Billboard gave the song a positive review: "The pretty melody and sentimental lyrics should prove popular with country radio listeners."

== Music video ==
The music video was directed by Bill Young. It starts out in a house museum with a boy who is on a tour, and before going along with the tour, he takes a look at a picture of a woman. Then he starts to imagine her at a party in a past themed time, with Walker singing in a background with a bright moon right behind him.

== Chart positions ==
"Hypnotize the Moon" debuted at number 55 on the U.S. Billboard Hot Country Singles & Tracks for the week of January 13, 1996.

=== Charts ===
Chart (1996)	Peak position
Canada Country Singles (RPM)	6
US Bubbling Under Hot 100 (Billboard)	5
US Hot Country Songs (Billboard)	2

=== Year-end charts ===
Chart (1996)	Position
Canada Country Tracks (RPM)	63
US Country Songs (Billboard)	9
