= Jerry Kilgore (singer) =

American singer-songwriter (born 1964)

- Born: November 12, 1964 (age 61)
- Origin: Tillamook, Oregon, U.S.
- Genres: Country
- Occupation: Singer-songwriter
- Instruments: Vocals rhythm guitar
- Years active: 1995–2001, 2008–present
- Labels: Asylum, Virgin Records Nashville, Nic-Nic-Neer

Jerry Kilgore (born November 12, 1964, in Tillamook, Oregon) is an American country music artist. He has recorded three studio albums: 1999's Love Trip on the Virgin Records label. 2007's Loaded & Empty and 2012's Telephone, TX were released on his personal Nic-Nic-Neer label. The first album produced three chart singles on the Billboard country music charts, including a Top 40 in its title track. In addition, Kilgore has written singles for Tracy Byrd, John Michael Montgomery and Clay Walker.

== Biography ==
Kilgore got his start playing various bars throughout the Portland, Oregon area, subsequently moving to Mesa, Arizona and later to North Carolina before he moved to Nashville, Tennessee. Eventually, he found a deal as a songwriter, and in 1995, Tracy Byrd entered Top 10 on the Billboard Hot Country Singles & Tracks with "Love Lessons", which Kilgore co-wrote. Kilgore also signed to Asylum Records in 1997 but did not record anything for the label. Kilgore revealed on Irish Country Music channel, Keep It Country TV, in an interview with Tommy Rosney that he did record an un-released album for Asylum Records that was produced by Randy Travis producer Kyle Lehning In 1998, John Michael Montgomery also had a top 5 country hit with "Cover You in Kisses", another song co-written by Kilgore. A year later, Kilgore was signed to Virgin Records as a recording artist, becoming the first artist signed to the label's Nashville division. His debut album Love Trip was released that year, and its title track was a Top 40 hit on the country charts in late 1999. The album's other two singles failed to make Top 40, and Kilgore was dropped from Virgin Nashville's roster in 2000. He co-wrote Clay Walker's 2001 single "If You Ever Feel Like Lovin' Me Again".

In 2007 (Loaded & Empty) and 2012 (Telephone, TX), Kilgore released independent CDs on Nic-Nic-Neer Records, .

== Discography ==
=== Albums ===
| Title | Album details |
|---|---|
| Love Trip | Release date: September 21, 1999; Label: Virgin Records |
| Loaded & Empty | Release date: March 18, 2008; Label: Nic-Nic Neer Records |
| Telephone, TX | Release date: March 31, 2012; Label: Nic-Nic Neer Records |
| Those Seven Years | Release date: July 16, 2014; Label: Nic-Nic Neer Records |

=== Singles ===
| Year | Single | Peak chart positions | | Album |
| Year | Single | US Country | CAN Country | Album |
|---|---|---|---|---|
| 1999 | "Love Trip" | 36 | 64 | Love Trip |
| 2000 | "The Look" | 49 | — | Love Trip |
| 2000 | "Cactus in a Coffee Can" | 73 | — | Love Trip |
| 2008 | "What's It Take to Get a Drink in Here" | — | — | Loaded & Empty |
| 2011 | "Places to Go" | — | — | Telephone, TX |
"—" denotes releases that did not chart

=== Music videos ===
| Year | Video | Director |
|---|---|---|
| 1999 | "Love Trip" | Brent Hedgecock |
| 2000 | "The Look" | Brent Hedgecock |
| 2008 | "What's It Take to Get a Drink in Here" | David Colon |
| 2011 | "Places to Go" | David Colon |
