= Watch This (Clay Walker song) =

Single by Clay Walker

from the album Rumor Has It
- Released: August 11, 1997
- Genre: Country
- Length: 3:10
- Label: Giant
- Songwriters: Ron Harbin; Aaron Barker; Anthony L. Smith
- Producers: James Stroud; Clay Walker

Clay Walker singles chronology
| "One, Two, I Love You" (1997) | "Watch This" (1997) | "Then What?" (1998) |

"Watch This" is a song recorded by American country music singer Clay Walker. It was released in August 1997 as the third single from his album Rumor Has It.

The song is Walker's fourteenth single release, as well as his tenth Top Ten hit on the Billboard country singles charts.

== Content ==
"Watch This" was written by Ron Harbin, Aaron Barker and Anthony L. Smith. The song is a mid-tempo ballad in which the male narrator encourages his female lover to trust him and fall in love with him.

The song features accompaniment from steel-string acoustic guitar and piano, with Dobro and fiddle flourishes.

== Music video ==
A music video was filmed for this song and premiered in August 1997. It was directed by Bill Young.

== Chart positions ==
"Watch This" is Walker's fourteenth Top 40 single on the Billboard country singles charts, making its debut at number 61 on the chart week of August 9, 1997. The song spent twenty weeks on the charts, peaking at number 4 on the chart week of November 22. It also peaked at number 13 on the RPM Country Tracks charts in Canada.

=== Charts ===
Chart performance for "Watch This"
| Chart (1997) | Peak position |
|---|---|
| Canada Country Singles (RPM) | 13 |
| US Hot Country Songs (Billboard) | 4 |
