= Only on Days That End in "Y" =

"Only on Days That End in 'Y'"

Single by Clay Walker

from the album Hypnotize the Moon
- Released: May 27, 1996
- Recorded: 1995
- Genre: Country
- Length: 2:46
- Label: Giant
- Songwriter: Richard Fagan
- Producer: James Stroud

Clay Walker singles chronology
"Hypnotize the Moon" (1996)	"Only on Days That End in 'Y'" (1996)	"Bury the Shovel" (1996)

"Only on Days That End in 'Y'" is a song written by Richard Fagan, and recorded by American country music singer Clay Walker. It was released May 27, 1996 as the third single from his album Hypnotize the Moon. It peaked at number 5 on the Billboard Hot Country Singles & Tracks chart, and also reached number 7 in Canada.

== Content ==
The narrator is telling his lover that he only misses her on days that end in "Y". He also says he only misses her when he's awake, when he's sleeping, when he's alone, or when he's with somebody. It would mean that he actually misses her every day and every time.

== Critical reception ==
Larry Flick of Billboard gave the song a positive review: "The song's theme is somewhat well worn in country music, but the track revisits the lost-love scenario with a cleverly penned lyric and a dancefloor beat."

Mike Joyce of The Washington Post in his review of Hypnotize the Moon wrote, "Walker also gets a big assist from other songwriters, particularly Richard Fagan, who contributes the clever and spirited heartbreaker, 'Only on Days That End in `Y.'" Editors at USA Today wrote, "Only on Days That End in "Y" is one of those ideas that isn't clever enough to carry a whole song."

== Chart positions ==
"Only on Days That End in "Y"" debuted at number 56 on the U.S. Billboard Hot Country Singles & Tracks for the week of May 25, 1996.

=== Charts ===
Chart (1996)	Peak position
Canada Country Singles (RPM)	7
US Hot Country Songs (Billboard)	5

=== Year-end charts ===
Chart (1996)	Position
Canada Country Tracks (RPM)	60
US Country Songs (Billboard)	46
