= If I Could Make a Living (song) =

Single by Clay Walker

from the album If I Could Make a Living
- B-side: "Down by the Riverside"
- Released: September 13, 1994
- Genre: Country
- Length: 2:14
- Label: Giant
- Songwriters: Alan Jackson; Keith Stegall; Roger Murrah
- Producer: James Stroud

Clay Walker singles chronology
"Dreaming with My Eyes Open" (1994)	"If I Could Make a Living" (1994)	"This Woman and This Man" (1994)

"If I Could Make a Living" is a song written by Alan Jackson, Keith Stegall and Roger Murrah, and recorded by American country music artist Clay Walker. It was released in September 1994 as the first single and title track from his album of the same name. It was Walker's fifth chart entry, and became his fourth Number One hit on the Billboard country charts in November 1994. It also reached #21 on the Bubbling Under Hot 100 charts, and on the Canadian RPM country charts, it followed Jackson's "Livin' on Love" at Number One. ("Living" topped the charts two weeks after "Livin' on Love" spent its third week at Number One on the Billboard country charts.)

== Background ==
In an interview with The Columbus Dispatch Walker revealed he was mildly dissatisfied with the single and stated, "I didn't pick the musicians or anything for If I Could Make a Living. I'm not saying there's anything wrong with doing songs with pop melodies, but I find the more mature I get with my music, the more traditional I become. The older I get, the more I love that fiddle and pedal (steel) sound, that pure country sound." In the same interview, Walker also said "If I Could Make a Living is really a fun-lovin' song, but it's a short song . . . a really short song, only two minutes and 14 seconds. Every night I do that song in concert I think, 'Man, that's not enough.'"

== Content ==
The song is an up-tempo in which the narrator says that, if he could make a living out of loving his partner, he would "be a millionaire in a week or two" and never have to leave her behind.

== Critical reception ==
Larry Flick of Billboard gave the song a mixed review writing "Walker has made a hell of a living selling this kind of cornbread-philosophical lyric. Co-written by Alan Jackson, this sounds an awful lot like one of his leftovers. And that ain't necessarily a bad thing."

Tara Seetharam of Country Universe listed "If I Could Make a Living" as the 374th best country single of the 1990s and wrote, "This song is either ridiculously cheesy or irresistibly cheesy depending on your taste, but there's no denying Walker sells the heck out of it with charm and enthusiasm."

== Music video ==
The music video was directed by Michael Merriman, and premiered in late 1994.

== Charts ==
=== Weekly charts ===
Chart (1994)	Peak position
Canada Country Singles (RPM)	1
US Bubbling Under Hot 100 (Billboard)	21
US Hot Country Songs (Billboard)	1

=== Year-end charts ===
Chart (1994)	Position
Canada Country Tracks (RPM)	11
