= I Can't Sleep (song) =

Single by Clay Walker

from the album A Few Questions
- Released: January 5, 2004
- Genre: Country
- Length: 4:02
- Label: RCA Nashville
- Songwriters: Chely Wright; Clay Walker
- Producers: Jimmy Ritchey; Clay Walker

Clay Walker singles chronology
"A Few Questions" (2003)	"I Can't Sleep" (2004)	"Jesus Was a Country Boy" (2004)

"I Can't Sleep" is a song co-written and recorded by American country music singer Clay Walker. It was released in January 2004 as the second single from his album A Few Questions, it peaked at #9 on the Hot Country Singles & Tracks (now Hot Country Songs) chart. Walker co-wrote the song with fellow country singer Chely Wright.

== Background ==
In an interview with Country Weekly, Walker said, "It's an R&B kind of song I started one day at the beach. Not long after that, Chely Wright and Lonestar's Richie McDonald came on my bus at a show in Colorado and we played songs we'd each started writing. When I played a piece of 'I Can't Sleep,' Chely said she could help me finish it. And when we played it at Chely's annual charity fundraiser during Fan Fair last June, it got a standing ovation."

Wright told Jam!, "The most creative thing happened the other night when we were in Colorado and Clay Walker was on the show as well. I popped up on his bus to say hi ... we got to talkin' about songs and we passed the guitar back and forth a couple of times and played some new stuff we'd written. We sat there and wrote a brand new song. It's moments like that which are the most exciting ... a song just pops out because you love music."

== Content ==
The song describes a narrator who has been up all night long waiting for his wife to return home.

In the second verse of the song, the narrator looks back at when his wife said, "We couldn't last / [He] couldn't swallow [his] pride", and that losing her wakes him up in the middle of the night.

== Critical reception ==
Mandy Davis of the St. Louis Post-Dispatch commented in her review of "A Few Questions", "On "I Can't Sleep," you can almost hear Walker pleading for the crossover success of Garth Brooks or Tim McGraw.".

== Music video ==
The music video was directed by Trey Fanjoy and filmed in Havana, Cuba in December 2003. It features Walker wandering the streets of a foreign city looking for the one he loves. Some scenes also feature him sitting on his bed singing the song. The music video premiered on CMT during CMT's "Most Wanted Live" on January 24, 2004.

In regards to the video's filming location, Walker stated, "If anyone has any doubt as to what life would be like without the freedoms and liberties granted to us in America, I suggest they spend a little time in a Communist country like Cuba." During an interview with The Dallas Morning News Walker said, "It's really different being in a communist country. I never realized how oppressive communism is. It was depressing to me. As Americans, we are all in 100 percent control of our attitudes. But when you live in a communist country, you have no hope. I don't care what you are, a conservative Republican or a liberal Democrat, before you open your mouth to run down this country, you should go spend a week in Cuba and see how things are in that country. There will be no food wasted on my plate. People have nothing to eat there."

== Chart performance ==
This song debuted at number 55 on the U.S. Billboard Hot Country Singles & Tracks chart dated December 13, 2003. The song charted for a total of 29 weeks, and finally peaked at number 9 on the chart dated June 19, 2004. Additionally, it peaked at number 61 on the U.S. Billboard Hot 100.

=== Charts ===
Chart (2004)	Peak position
US Hot Country Songs (Billboard)	9
US Billboard Hot 100	61

=== Year-end charts ===
Chart (2004)	Peak position
U.S. Billboard Hot Country Songs	51
