= This Woman and This Man =

"This Woman And This Man"

Single by Clay Walker

from the album If I Could Make a Living
- B-side: "Lose Your Memory"
- Released: December 13, 1994
- Recorded: 1994
- Genre: Country
- Length: 4:23 (album version); 3:35 (single version)
- Label: Giant
- Songwriters: Jeff Pennig; Michael Lunn
- Producer: James Stroud

Clay Walker singles chronology
"If I Could Make a Living" (1994)	"This Woman And This Man" (1994)	"My Heart Will Never Know" (1995)

"This Woman And This Man" is a song written by Jeff Pennig and Michael Lunn, and recorded by American country music singer Clay Walker. It was released in December 1994 as the second single from his album If I Could Make a Living. The song reached the top of the Billboard Hot Country Singles & Tracks chart.

== Background ==
Walker told The Dallas Morning News, "I felt this song speaks to the listener, it definitely spoke to me. I've lived that song as well as everybody else who has been in love before."

== Critical reception ==
Larry Flick of Billboard gave the song a positive review writing "Walker has never sounded better than he does on this midtempo tale of a frustrating relationship. It is nice to see that even with all his success Walker intends to grow into that hat." Mario Tarradell of The Dallas Morning News wrote, Not only is it the best vocal performance by Mr. Walker thus far, it's the classiest piece of music he's ever recorded. Mario Tarradell later wrote, "This Woman and This Man, his biggest chart single yet, is a smooth, melodic ballad with a new twist on the age-old struggle to keep an ailing relationship beating."

Kevin John Coyne of Country Universe listed "This Woman and This Man" as the 147th best country single of the 1990s and wrote, "Against a pleading melody, Walker sings of a man who's trying desperately to make his other half understand that there's still a chance to save their relationship. That he feels the only way he can communicate this is by stripping the situation down to an anonymous woman and man is heartbreaking."

== Music video ==
The music video was directed by Bill Young, and premiered in early 1995. In addition to Walker singing the song, it also shows him and his lover at a meeting (presumably to sign divorce papers). There, his lover is seeming to forget about him. He eventually leaves angry at her. Then his lover goes after him, and she comforts him. It also shows Walker in an old black and white theme with a woman and a man.

== Charts ==
"This Woman and This Man" officially debuted at number 53 on the U.S. Billboard Hot Country Singles & Tracks for the week of January 14, 1995. On the chart week of March 18, 1995, the song would not only become Walker's fifth Number One hit, but also the first country single on the Giant label to remain at the top spot for two consecutive weeks, as it would also remain at Number One the following week of March 25, 1995.

=== Charts ===
Chart (1994–1995)	Peak position
Canada Country Singles (RPM)	2
US Hot Country Songs (Billboard)	1

=== Year-end charts ===
Chart (1995)	Position
Canada Country Tracks (RPM)	24
US Country Songs (Billboard)	7
