= Say No More (song) =

Single by Clay Walker

from the album Say No More
- Released: February 12, 2001
- Genre: Country
- Length: 3:15
- Label: Warner Bros. Nashville
- Songwriters: George Teren, Tom Shapiro
- Producers: Blake Mevis, Clay Walker

Clay Walker singles chronology
| "Once in a Lifetime Love" (2000) | "Say No More" (2001) | "If You Ever Feel Like Lovin' Me Again" (2001) |

"'Say No More" is a song written by George Teren and Tom Shapiro, and recorded by American country music singer Clay Walker. It was released in February 2001 as the title track and first single to his album Say No More. It peaked at number 33 on the Billboard Hot Country Singles & Tracks.

== Background ==
Walker stated " `Say No More' is probably the most different song we've ever cut. I like it from a creative aspect. It's very different melodically. It's one of those songs that makes you keep listening because the chord changes are very different."

== Content ==
The male narrator tells his former female lover to "say no more" about their relationship ending. He understand that it wasn't working and that they are through.

== Critical reception ==
In a review of Walker's album "Say No More", Maria Konicki Dinoia of AllMusic wrote, "The album's title track is an awesome song about falling out of love." In a review of the album on About.com, it was written "The first single off the album is the title track, and it's a great power ballad."

== Chart positions ==
"'Say No More" debuted at number 59 on the U.S. Billboard Hot Country Singles & Tracks for the week of February 24, 2001. The song is Walker's twenty-first Top 40 single on the Billboard country singles charts. The song peaked at number 33 for the week of April 14 and spent twelve weeks on the chart.

=== Charts ===
| Chart (2001) | Peak position |
|---|---|
| US Hot Country Songs (Billboard) | 33 |
