= Then What? =

Single by Clay Walker

from the album Rumor Has It
- B-side: "Country Boy and City Girl"
- Released: January 13, 1998
- Recorded: 1997
- Genre: Country
- Length: 3:03
- Label: Giant
- Songwriters: Jon Vezner, Randy Sharp
- Producers: James Stroud, Clay Walker

Clay Walker singles chronology
"Watch This" (1997)	"Then What?" (1998)	"Ordinary People" (1998)

Alternative cover
- Dance Mix cover

"Then What?" is a song written by Jon Vezner and Randy Sharp, and recorded by American country music artist Clay Walker. It reached the Top 5 on the Billboard Hot Country Singles & Tracks (now Hot Country Songs) chart. It was released in January 1998 as the fourth and final single from his album Rumor Has It.

== Content ==
The song's subject concerns advising a man against committing adultery, and the consequences that infidelity would bring for the rest of his life.

== Background ==
In an interview with Billboard Walker stated, "Music should provoke some type of emotion in people, whether it be sad, romantic, or happy, and 'Then What?' is definitely a pick-me-upper." He also stated, "As an entertainer, being on the road so much, I hope to have a song that will go over good live. And this is probably the best song live that we've had since my first single."

== Critical reception ==
Larry Flick of Billboard wrote "The island feel of this track's production gives Walker's new single a fresh, bouncy, and totally appealing sound. Walker's vocal is teeming with personality, and this little number should find instant favor among programmers looking for a sunny winter offering." The Dallas Morning News wrote, "A quasi-calypso ditty - you can't get more innocuous than this - the song's accompanying video comes complete with Gilligan's Island motif and the usually stiff Mr. Walker donning sandals and singing with his denim shirt wide open.

Kevin John Coyne of Country Universe listed "Then What?" as the 377th greatest contemporary country single and wrote, "With this out-of-left-field smash, Walker has the dubious honor of bringing Caribbean-flavored country back to the forefront."

== Music video ==
The music video was directed by Martin Kahan. It has a very summery beachy theme, with Walker performing the song against an aquarium backdrop with a huge shark with its mouth wide open in the middle to an audience, and at a boat marina both on a pier and a boat singing to the customers as they are boarding. Other scenes feature Walker inside a huge crocodile prop, a couple going into a huge fish head only to run out again, people painting green balls, and a reggae band playing on a beach.

== Chart performance ==
This song debuted at number 60 on the Hot Country Singles & Tracks chart dated December 27, 1997. It charted for 27 weeks on that chart, and peaked at number 2 on the chart dated April 11, 1998. It also peaked at number 65 on the Billboard Hot 100.

=== Charts ===
Chart (1998)	Peak position
Canada Country Singles (RPM)	4
US Billboard Hot 100	65
US Hot Country Songs (Billboard)	2

=== Year-end charts ===
Chart (1998)	Position
Canada Country Tracks (RPM)	58
US Country Songs (Billboard)	12
