= Rumor Has It (Clay Walker song) =

Single by Clay Walker

from the album Rumor Has It
- Released: February 3, 1997
- Recorded: Fall 1996
- Genre: Country
- Length: 3:10 (album version); 2:56 (single version)
- Label: Giant
- Songwriters: Clay Walker, M. Jason Greene
- Producers: James Stroud and Clay Walker

Clay Walker singles chronology
"Bury the Shovel" (1996)	"Rumor Has It" (1997)	"One, Two, I Love You" (1997)

"Rumor Has It" is a song co-written and recorded by American country music singer Clay Walker that reached the top of the Billboard Hot Country Songs chart. It was released in February 1997 as the first single and title track from his album of the same name. The song was written by Walker and M. Jason Greene.

== Background ==
In an interview with Billboard, Walker said, "The lyric and content have become a lot more positive. [Strait's] 'Check Yes or No'--very positive; my song 'Rumor Has It'--very positive. When I do a concert, I can sing for 3- and 4- and 5-year-old kids and not have a guilty conscience about it. I don't want to go out there and depress people. I want them to smile and feel good and feel the way I feel. We don't live that long, and that's one thing that having MS made me realize. My God, you need to love your family, you need to love your friends, and you don't need to carry bitterness in your heart because you don't live that doggone long. That's about as simple as I can say it."

Rumor Has It premiered on Walker's website on January 8, 1997. Danny O'Brian, Walker's manager said, "We thought it would be a great idea to let Clay's fans all over the world get a sneak peek at Clay's new material, and what better way than the internet."

== Critical reception ==
Larry Flick of Billboard gave the song a mixed review by writing "The steel guitar based production by the singer with James Stroud has bounce. Also, Walker turns in a solid vocal performance, but the song is nothing memorable".

Kevin John Coyne of Country Universe listed "Rumor Has It" as the 219th best country single of the 1990s and wrote, "I find myself wanting to use the word “charming” every time I write about Walker, but that’s just what this is: a charming little record that he sings with sincerity."

== Music video ==
The music video premiered in January 1997 and was directed by Bill Young. It features Walker singing on a stage, and a couple talking to each other through a computer.

Walker mentioned that he thought that Country Music Television helped his career by saying, "I have been blessed by many things in my career, including the fact that my music videos can be seen by millions of people around the world because of CMT." Chris Parr, Director, Programming of CMT said, "Ten of Clay’s 11 videos have charted on CMT, which is an outstanding track record. These accomplishments speak well of the quality of Clay’s videos, his vocal performance and song selection, as well as favorable response from CMT viewers."

== Live performances ==
Walker performed "Rumor Has It" on TNN's "Prime Time Country" on September 3, 1997.

== Charts ==
The song debuted at number 48 on the Billboard Hot Country Singles & Tracks chart dated February 1, 1997. It climbed to Number One in April, where it held for two weeks. This song was Walker's sixth and final Number One single to date. "Rumor Has It" was also the 48th most played song of 1997.

=== Charts ===
Chart (1997)	Peak position
Canada Country Singles (RPM)	1
US Hot Country Songs (Billboard)	1

=== Year-end charts ===
Chart (1997)	Peak position
Canada Country Tracks (RPM)	7
US Country Songs (Billboard)	6
