= Hank Williams III discography =

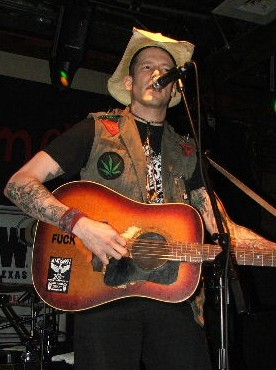
- Williams in 2006
- Studio albums: 11
- Live albums: 1
- Compilation albums: 4
- Singles: 49
- Music videos: 5
- Collaboration: 2

American musician Hank Williams III has released eleven studio albums, one live album, four compilation albums, and 49 singles. His discography is noted for a large number of projects released without his permission.

== Studio albums ==
Title	Album details	Peak chart positions			
Title	Album details	U.S. Country	U.S.	U.S. Heat	U.S. Indie
Risin' Outlaw	Release date: September 7, 1999; Label: Curb Records	52	—	—	—
Lovesick, Broke and Driftin'	Release date: January 29, 2002; Label: Curb Records	17	156	4	—
Straight to Hell	Release date: February 28, 2006; Label: Curb Records	17	73	—	—
Damn Right, Rebel Proud	Release date: October 21, 2008; Label: Sidewalk Records	2	18	—	—
Rebel Within	Release date: May 25, 2010; Label: Curb Records	4	20	—	—
Ghost to a Ghost/Gutter Town	Release date: September 6, 2011; Label: Megaforce Records/Hank 3 Records	14	49	—	7
3 Bar Ranch Cattle Callin'	Release date: September 6, 2011; Label: Megaforce Records/Hank 3 Records	—	—	—	27
Attention Deficit Domination	Release date: September 6, 2011; Label: Megaforce Records/Hank 3 Records	—	179	—	21
Brothers of the 4×4	Release date: September 30, 2013; Label: Megaforce Records/Hank 3 Records	10	61	—	12
A Fiendish Threat	Release date: September 30, 2013; Label: Megaforce Records/Hank 3 Records	—	—	—	42
"—" denotes releases that did not chart

== Collaboration albums and side projects ==
Title	Album details	Peak chart positions			
Title	Album details	U.S. Country	U.S.	U.S. Heat	U.S. Indie
Three Hanks: Men with Broken Hearts (with Hank Williams Sr. and Hank Williams Jr.)	Release date: September 17, 1996; Label: Curb Records	29	167	—	—
Assjack (with Assjack)	Release date: August 4, 2009; Label: Curb Records	—	92	—	—
"—" denotes releases that did not chart

== Unsanctioned albums ==
After Williams left the label, Curb Records decided to release old materials but advertising those albums as new releases. Williams, who never authorized these albums, rejected their validity.

=== Hillbilly Joker ===
Released May 17, 2011 on the sublabel Sidewalk Records.

Hillbilly Joker is essentially the same album as This Ain't Country, recorded in 2001 but rejected by the label. Two missing tracks ("Hang On" and "Runnin' and Gunnin'") were not included here but on the third collection.

=== Long Gone Daddy ===
Released April 17, 2012 on Curb Records.

Title	Original source
"I'm a Long Gone Daddy"	Timeless: Hank Williams Tribute
"Sun Comes Up"	Lovesick, Broke and Driftin' outtake
"The Bottle Let Me Down"	(Unknown, Merle Haggard cover)
"Wreck of the Old '97"	Dressed in Black: A Tribute to Johnny Cash
"'Neath a Cold Gray Tomb of Stone"	Three Hanks: Men with Broken Hearts
"The Wind Blew Cold"	(Unknown)
"Good Hearted Woman"	(Unknown, Waylon Jennings cover)
"This Ain't Montgomery" (with Joey Allcorn)	Actually by Allcorn with Hank III as guest; from 50 Years Too Late
"What They Want Me to Be"	"Trashville" (from Lovesick, Broke and Driftin'), but remixed with little overdubbings
"If the Shoe Fits (Shuffle Mix)"	Slightly alternate version, originally from Risin' Outlaw

=== Ramblin' Man ===
Released April 1, 2014 on Curb Records.

Title	Original source
"Ramblin' Man" (with Melvins)	Actually by the Melvins with Hank III as guest; Hank Williams Sr. cover from The Crybaby
"Fearless Boogie"	Sharp Dressed Men: A Tribute to ZZ Top
"Okie from Muskogee" (with Melvins)	Actually by the Melvins with Hank III as guest; Merle Haggard cover from The Crybaby
"The Only Hell (My Momma Ever Raised)"	Touch My Heart: A Tribute to Johnny Paycheck; Damn Right, Rebel Proud outtake
"On My Own (Full Length Version)"	Risin' Outlaw alternate cut
"Marijuana Blues"	Rare Breed: The Songs of Peter La Farge
"Hang On"	This Ain't Country (and Driven soundtrack)
"Runnin' & Gunnin'"	This Ain't Country

=== Take as Needed for Pain ===
Released April 14, 2015 on Curb Records.

Title	Original source
"Get Outta My Life" (with Cowboys from Hell & David Allan Coe)	Actually by David Allan Coe & Cowboys from Hell with Hank III as guest, from Rebel Meets Rebel
"Ruby, Get Back to the Hills"	Everybody Loves... ANTiSEEN: A Loving Tribute to the Boys from Brutalsville
"Torn Between Suicide & Breakfast"	For the Sick: A Tribute to Eyehategod under the name of The Unholy Three
"No Values"	Rise Above: 24 Black Flag Songs to Benefit the West Memphis Three
"Gotta Buy Paw a Truck"	Redneck Ride (by AssJack) alternate version
"Take as Needed for Pain"	For the Sick: A Tribute to Eyehategod under the name of The Unholy Three
"White Trash"	(Probably a version of the live song "White Trash Pt. 1")
"King Cartel"	(Unknown)

=== Greatest Hits ===
Released August 18, 2017 on Curb Records.

A selection of tracks from the country albums done on the label (mainly from Straight to Hell).

== Official bootlegs ==
Hank III started sharing bootlegs of his own live shows, specially of his heavier stuff, and (on the last one) demos of the then-unreleased AssJack album.

Year	Album details
2000	Hank III Says Fuck You!!!
2000	Life of Sin/Hellbilly (45 rpm)
2001	Live in Scotland
2001	Bootleg #1
2001	Bootleg #2
2002	Bootleg #3

== Singles ==
Year	Single	Peak positions	Album
Year	Single	U.S. Country	Album
1996	"Move It On Over" (with Hank Williams and Hank Williams Jr.)	—	Three Hanks: Men with Broken Hearts
2000	"You're the Reason"	—	Risin' Outlaw
2001	"I Don't Know"	50	Risin' Outlaw
2001	"If the Shoe Fits"	—	Risin' Outlaw
2002	"Mississippi Mud"	—	Lovesick, Broke and Driftin'
2002	"Cecil Brown"	—	Lovesick, Broke and Driftin'
2003	"Nighttime Ramblin' Man"	—	Lovesick, Broke and Driftin'
2006	"Low Down"	—	Straight to Hell
2007	"Louisiana Stripes"	—	Straight to Hell
2008	"Six Pack of Beer"	—	Damn Right, Rebel Proud
2008	"Long Hauls and Close Calls"	—	Damn Right, Rebel Proud
2009	"P.F.F"	—	Damn Right, Rebel Proud
2009	"Redneck Ride"	—	Assjack
2010	"#5"	—	Rebel Within
2010	"Rebel Within"	—	Rebel Within
2010	"Lost in Oklahoma"	—	Rebel Within
2010	"Karmageddon"	—	Rebel Within
2011	"Hellbilly"	—	Hillbilly Joker
2011	"Tennessee Driver"	—	Hillbilly Joker
2011	"Hillbilly Joker"	—	Hillbilly Joker
2011	"Gutter Town"	—	Ghost on a Ghost/Gutter Town
2011	"Gutter Stomp"	—	Ghost on a Ghost/Gutter Town
2011	"Outlaw Convention"	—	Ghost on a Ghost/Gutter Town
2012	"The Wind Blew Cold"	—	Long Gone Daddy
2012	"Sun Comes Up"	—	Long Gone Daddy
2012	"Good Hearted Woman"	—	Long Gone Daddy
2012	"The Bottle Let Me Down"	—	Long Gone Daddy
2012	"Make a Fall"	—	Attention Deficit Domination
2012	"Goats "N" Heathans"	—	Attention Deficit Domination
2012	"Livin' Beyond Doom"	—	Attention Deficit Domination
2012	"In the Camouflage"	—	Attention Deficit Domination
2012	"Demons Mark"	—	Attention Deficit Domination
2012	"Black Cow"	—	3 Bar Ranch Cattle Callin'
2012	"Mad Cow"	—	3 Bar Ranch Cattle Callin'
2012	"Square Bailor"	—	3 Bar Ranch Cattle Callin'
2012	"Countin Cows"	—	3 Bar Ranch Cattle Callin'
2012	"Branded"	—	3 Bar Ranch Cattle Callin'
2012	"Moo You"	—	3 Bar Ranch Cattle Callin'
2013	"Nearly Gone"	—	Brothers of the 4×4
2013	"The Outdoor Plan"	—	Brothers of the 4×4
2013	"Broken Boogie"	—	Brothers of the 4×4
2013	"Deep Scars"	—	Brothers of the 4×4
2013	"Farthest Away"	—	Brothers of the 4×4
2013	"Fight My Way"	—	A Fiendish Threat
2013	"Broke Jaw"	—	A Fiendish Threat
2013	"Your Floor"	—	A Fiendish Threat
2014	"Breakin' Free"	—	A Fiendish Threat
2014	"Different from the Rest"	—	A Fiendish Threat
2014	"Runnin' and Gunnin'"	—	Ramblin' Man
2014	"Marijuana Blues"	—	Ramblin' Man
2014	"I'm the Only Hell My Mama Ever Raised"	—	Ramblin' Man
2015	"White Trash"	—	Take as Needed for Pain
2015	"No Values"	—	Take as Needed for Pain
2016	"Torn Between Suicide & Breakfast"	—	Take as Needed for Pain
2016	"King Cartel"	—	Take as Needed for Pain
"—" denotes releases that did not chart

== Notable appearances ==
Year	Song	Album	Artist
2000	"Ramblin' Man"	The Crybaby	Melvins
2000	"Okie from Muskogee"	The Crybaby	Melvins
2001	"I'm a Long Gone Daddy"	Timeless: A Tribute to Hank Williams	Himself
2002	"Fearless Boogie"	Sharp Dressed Men: A Tribute to ZZ Top	Himself
2006	"Ruby Get Back to the Hills"	Everybody Loves... ANTiSEEN	Himself
2008	"Swallowed By Sin"	Satan Is Watching	Those Poor Bastards
2009	"Black Dog Yodel (Acoustic)" "Black Dog Yodel (Live)" "They Don't Make Folks Like They Used To (Live)"	Black Dog Yodel EP	Those Poor Bastards & Skelton (an alias for Hank III)
2015	"180 Proof"	180 Proof	Grandpa's Cough Medicine
2015	"Face of the Demon"	Volto Del Demone	Moonbow

== Music videos ==
Year	Video	Director
2000	"You're the Reason"	Preston Long
2008	"Long Hauls & Close Calls"	Win Riley
2009	"Redneck Ride"	Dave Prewitt
2014	"Different from the Rest"	
2014	"Loners 4 Life"	
