= The Early Years =

The Early Years or Early Years may refer to:

== Education ==
- Early Years Foundation Stage, UK education structure
- Early Years Professional Status, UK educational qualification

== Film, television and video games ==
- The Early Years: Erik Nietzsche Part 1, a 2007 film directed by Jacob Thuesen
- Dallas: The Early Years, a 1986 made-for-television film
- Doctor Who at the BBC Radiophonic Workshop Volume 1: The Early Years 1963–1969, a compilation of Doctor Who material
- Evolution/Revolution: The Early Years (1966–1974), a stand-up comedy recording by Richard Prior
- King of Kings: The Early Years, a video game
- The Early Years (film) (aka La giovinezza), a 2015 Italian film

== Music ==
- The Early Years (band), an English rock band

=== Albums ===
- The Early Years (Acid King album)
- The Early Years (D-A-D album)
- The Early Years (Dannii Minogue album)
- The Early Years (David Coverdale album)
- The Early Years (Deep Purple album)
- The Early Years (Donovan album)
- The Early Years (Eluveitie album)
- The Early Years (Gasolin' album)
- The Early Years (Hall & Oates album)
- The Early Years (Helix album)
- The Early Years (Joe Nichols album)
- The Early Years (Phil Ochs album)
- The Early Years (The Starting Line album)
- The Early Years (Violeta de Outono album)
- The Early Years (Whitesnake album)
- The Early Years (Zemmoa album)
- The Early Years (ZOEgirl album)
- The Early Years (album series), by Tom Waits
- The Early Years 1946–1957, by Chet Atkins
- The Early Years 1964–1965, by the Monks
- The Early Years 1965–1972, by Pink Floyd
- The Early Years 79–81, by Def Leppard
- The Early Years: 1990–1995, by the Casualties
- The Early Years (1996–2001), by Skillet
- The Early Years: 1997–2000, by Switchfoot
- The Early Years: Rare Demos '91–'94, by Ill Bill
- The Early Years – Revisited, by Zebrahead
- Early Years, Vol. 1, by Hank Williams Jr.
- Early Years, Vol. 2, by Hank Williams Jr.
- 18 Candles: The Early Years, by Silverstein
- Flying: The Early Years 1970–1973, an album by UFO
- Galloping Guitar: The Early Years, by Chet Atkins
- Portrait of Jaco: The Early Years, 1968–1978, by Jaco Pastorius
- Unchained Melody: The Early Years, by LeAnn Rimes
- The Early Years, by Aretha Franklin
- The Early Years, by Dropkick Murphys
- The Early Years, by Fra Lippo Lippi
- The Early Years, by Harem Scarem
- The Early Years, by Moev
- The Early Years, by Out of the Grey
- The Early Years, by Rebecca St. James
- The Early Years, by Rudy + Blitz
- The Early Years, by Sara Evans
- The Early Years, by Sonicflood
- The Early Years EP, by the Rocket Summer
- The Early Years 1977–1978, by Simple Minds
- The Early Years: 1988–1991, by Anal Cunt
- The Early Years '74 '75 '76 Rare Live and Unreleased, by the Stranglers
- Early Years, by Waltari
- The Very Best of Donovan: The Early Years, by Donovan

== See also ==
- Best of the Early Years (disambiguation)
