= Johnny Hiland =

American songwriter (born 1975)

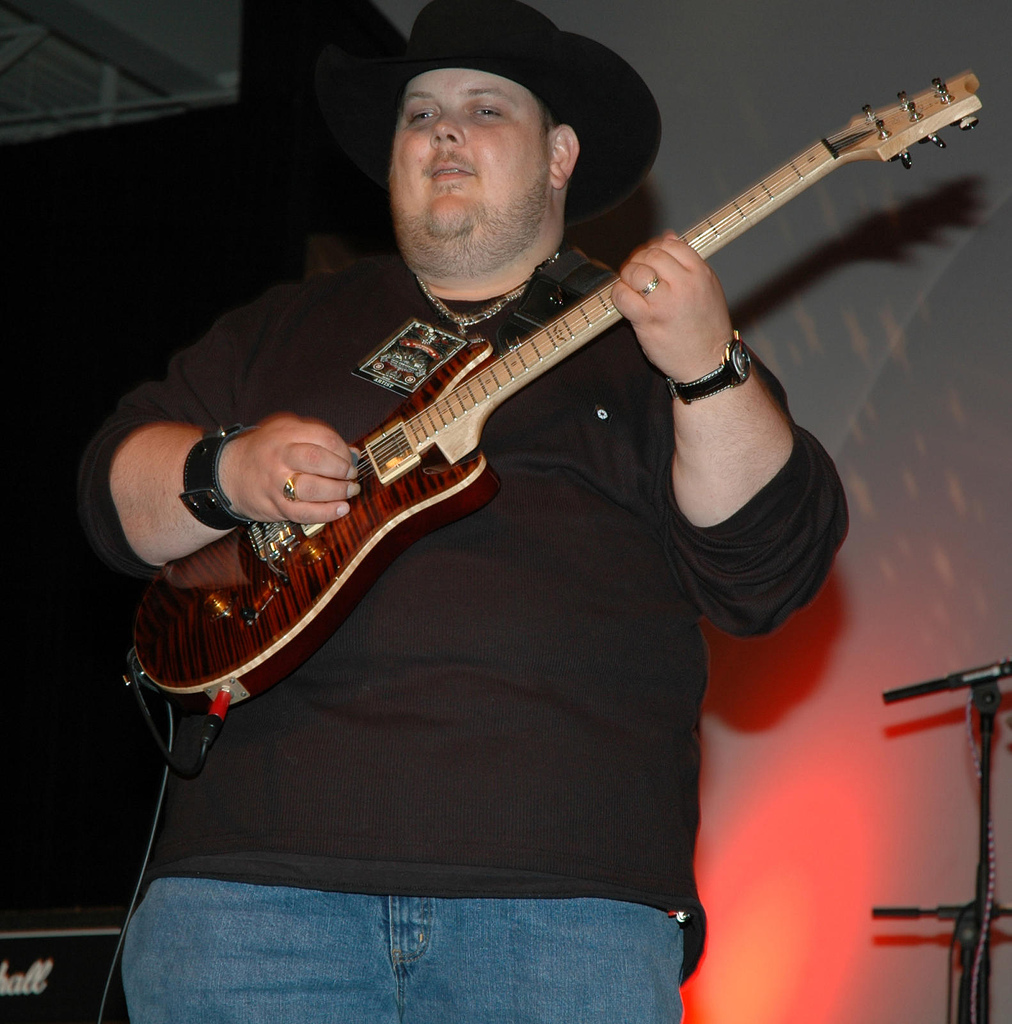

Background information
- Born: January 18, 1975 (age 51); Woodland, Maine, U.S.
- Genres: Country, rock
- Occupations: Musician, songwriter, session guitarist, clinician, guitar instructor
- Years active: 1996-present
- Labels: Favored Nations, Shrapnel, Independent, Provogue
- Website: johnnyhiland.net

Johnny Hiland is an American guitarist.

== Early life ==
Hiland grew up in Maine, with an eye disease called nystagmus, leaving him legally blind. He started playing guitar at age 2, played his first talent show at age 5, performed on Dick Stacey's Country Jamboree on local TV at age 7, and won Talent America at age 10, with sister Jodi and brother Jerry, "The 3 J's," playing bluegrass country. The 3 J's broke up when Johnny turned 15, due to his voice changing. Having picked up electric guitar at the age of 12, Johnny switched over to playing country, rock, and blues.

== Career ==
In 1996, Hiland moved to Nashville and worked as a session musician for country artists including Toby Keith, Ricky Skaggs, Janie Fricke, and Hank Williams III. Meanwhile, he played with the Don Kelley Band at Robert's Western World. Hiland signed with Steve Vai's Favored Nations label as a solo artist.

== Discography ==
- 2002 "Lovesick, Broke and Driftin," Hank Williams III, Curb
- 2002 "Forgive," Jesus and Bartenders, Rebecca Lynn Howard MCA
- 2004 Johnny Hiland (Favored Nations)
- 2004 "The Bluegrass Sessions," Lynn Anderson, DM Nashville
- 2004 "The Bluegrass Sessions," Janie Fricke, DM Nashville
- 2004 "Passing Through," Angels, Randy Travis, Word Records
- 2005 "R.I.D.E.," Trick Pony, Curb
- 2005 "Honky Tonk University," She Left Me, Toby Keith, DreamWorks Records Nashville
- 2006 Straight to Hell, Hank Williams III, Curb
- 2007 "Brand New Strings," Brand New Strings, Ricky Skaggs, Skaggs Family Records, Inc
- 2007 Jennifer Brantley, Breakdown, Mountainside Productions
- 2008 Damn Right, Rebel Proud, Hank Williams III, Curb
- 2009 Loud And Proud (O.I.E. Records)
- 2010 "Rebel Within," Hank Williams III, Sidewalk Records Inc.
- 2011 All Fired Up (Shrapnel Records)
- 2011 Rebel Within Audio, Hank Williams III, Curb
- 2011 Ghost to a Ghost/Gutter Town, Hank Williams III, Megaforce Records
- 2013 "Brothers of the 4x4," Hank 3, Hank 3 Records
- 2013 Higher To Go – A tribute To Forrest Lee, Sr., Out West Records
- 2015 "80 and Pickin' with my Friends," Nokie Edwards
