= Randy Kohrs =

American musician & recording engineer

- Born: Randy Alan Kohrs; New Virginia, Iowa
- Genres: Bluegrass music, country music
- Occupations: Musician, recording engineer
- Instruments: Acoustic and electric resonator guitar, acoustic and electric guitar, lap steel guitar, pedal steel guitar, slide guitar, mandolin, banjo, upright bass
- Years active: 1995–present
- Labels: Lonesome Day, Rural Rhythm, Left of Center
- Website: slackkeystudio.com

Randy Alan Kohrs is an American multi-instrumentalist best known for his resonator guitar prowess, but he plays 13 musical instruments. He is a Grammy-winning producer and recording engineer.

== Biography ==
=== Early years ===
Kohrs was born in Osceola, Iowa south of Des Moines and grew up on a farm near the rural town of New Virginia southwest of Indianola. He learned to play acoustic guitar from his uncle at age 8, quickly followed by resonator guitar. In his teens, Kohrs played with the Missouri bluegrass band Possum Trot. He played with them for 10 years while also fronting a local country band. He continued to learn to play other instruments including electric guitar, drums, mandolin, banjo, pedal steel, and bass.

=== Early career ===
In fall 1994, Kohrs moved to Nashville. In 1997 and 1998, Hank Williams III hired him to play in his band, then he toured in support of Tom T. Hall.

In 1998, he joined David Parmley, Scott Vestal and Continental Divide, singing tenor playing dobro. Kohrs played on the album Feel Good Day. Then he toured with Holly Dunn for two years and joined the John Cowan Band in 2000, playing on the album Always Take Me Back. Kohrs backed Patty Loveless on a taping of Austin City Limits television show on PBS. He has opened shows for Chris Stapleton. In 2003, Kohrs toured with Dolly Parton in her band the Blueniques, playing on three of her albums and performing as her opening act.

=== Solo career ===
In 2001, Kohrs released his first solo album A Crack in My Armour on Junction Records, and formed his own band The Lites. Guests on the album included Scott Vestal, Rickie Simpkins, and Stuart Duncan. Kohrs followed it in 2003 with the album Now It’s Empty on his own Left Of Center label. The album featured John Hughey on pedal steel and James Mitchell on electric guitar. Kohrs' next album was I’m Torn in 2004, which featured a duet with Dolly Parton on "It Looked Good On Paper."

In 2007, Kohrs released the Old Photograph album which featured Scott Vestal and Scott Haas on banjo; Jim Hurst, Clay Hess and Andrew Crawford on guitar; Tim Crouch and Ashley Brown on fiddle, Aaron Ramsey and Jesse Cobb on mandolin, and Jim Weaver and Darren Vincent on bass. In 2009, Kohrs released the album Quicksand on Rural Rhythm Records with Aaron Ramsey and Adam Steffey on mandolin. Kohrs composed five of the songs on the album.

=== Other projects ===
Kohrs is a recording engineer and producer; he runs Slack Key studios in Nashville, where he has recorded Larry Cordle & Lonesome Standard Time, Hank Williams III, Jim Lauderdale, and others.

In 2009, Jimmy Ross introduced the concept of a compilation album dedicated to luthier Tim Scheerhorn. Besides producing, engineering, and mixing the album Hornography, Ross released it on his Left of Center label. The album featured Kohrs, Ross, Scheerhorn, Rob Ickes, and resonator guitar artists.

=== Awards ===
In 2007, Kohrs won a Grammy award for his contributions to Jim Lauderdale's album The Bluegrass Diaries. Kohrs has been nominated numerous times for Dobro Player of the Year by the International Bluegrass Music Association.

=== Personal life ===
Kohrs proposed to his wife Shaunna Larkin onstage during a Dolly Parton concert. Kohrs and Larkin were married in a ceremony at the Ryman Auditorium in Nashville in September 2003. Kohrs married fiddler and vocalist Ashley Brown in April 2011 and they divorced in 2017.

== Discography ==
=== Solo albums ===
- 2001 A Crack in My Armour (Junction Records)
- 2003 Now It’s Empty (Left of Center) as Randy Kohrs and the Reel Deal
- 2004: I'm Torn (Lonesome Day)
- 2007: Old Photograph (Rural Rhythm)
- 2009: Quicksand (Rural Rhythm)

=== As producer ===
- 2006: Jim Lauderdale - Bluegrass (Yep Roc)
- 2007: Jim Lauderdale - The Bluegrass Diaries (Yep Roc)
- 2011: Jim Lauderdale - Reason And Rhyme: Bluegrass Songs By Robert Hunter and Jim Lauderdale (Sugar Hill)
- 2012: Jim Lauderdale - Carolina Moonrise (Sky Crunch)
- 2014: Jim and Lynna Woolsey - The Road That Brings You Home (Broken Record)

=== As engineer ===
2004 "I'm Torn" 2007 "Old Photograph" 2008: various artists - Hornography (Left of Center) 2010 "Quicksand" 2012: Lou Reid and Carolina - "Callin' Me Back Home" (KMA)

More than 400 records beyond these listed above were all engineered for other artists by Kohrs. The bulk of his tracks on other records were recorded at his own Slack key Studio in Nashville, Tennessee as well.

=== Also appears on ===
- 1991: Rhonda Vincent - Timeless and True Love (Rebel)
- 1997: Hank Thompson - Real Thing (Curb)
- 1998: Redd Volkaert - Telewacker (Hightone)
- 1998: various artists - Bluegrass '98 (Pinecastle)
- 2000: various artists - Bluegrass 2000 (Pinecastle)
- 2000: Scott Vestal - Millennia (Pinecastle)
- 2001: Mike Burns - Walk the Water's Edge (North Co)
- 2001: Dudley Connell - Another Saturday Night (Sugar Hill)
- 2001: Dave Evans - Hang Out a Light For Me (Rebel)
- 2001: David Parmley - What We Leave Behind (Pinecastle)
- 2001: various artists - Bluegrass 2001 (Pinecastle)
- 2002: The Chieftains - Down the Old Plank Road: The Nashville Sessions (RCA Victor)
- 2002 John Cowan - Always Take Me Back (Sugar Hill)
- 2002: Jim Lauderdale - The Hummingbirds (Dualtone)
- 2002: Rickie Simpkins - Don't Fret It (Doobie Shea)
- 2002: Hank Williams III - Lovesick, Broke and Driftin' (Curb)
- 2003: Dierks Bentley - Dierks Bentley (DM)
- 2003: The Chieftains - Further Down the Old Plank Road (RCA Victor)
- 2003: Dolly Parton - For God and Country (Vanguard)
- 2003: Don Rigsby - Midnight Call (Sugar Hill)
- 2004: Melonie Cannon - Melonie Cannon (Skaggs Family)
- 2004: Janie Fricke - The Bluegrass Sessions (DM)
- 2004: Alecia Nugent - Alecia Nugent (Rounder)
- 2004: Dolly Parton - Live and Well (Sugar Hill)
- 2005: Dierks Bentley - Modern Day Drifter (Capitol Nashville)
- 2005: Randy Travis - Glory Train: Songs of Faith, Worship, and Praise (Word / Warner Bros. / Curb)
- 2005: Darrell Webb - Behind the Scenes (Lonesome Day)
- 2006: Jan Smith - 29 Dances (Landslide)
- 2006: Hank Williams III - Straight to Hell (Bruc)
- 2006: The Wreckers - Stand Still, Look Pretty (Maverick / Warner Bros.)
- 2007: Little Big Town - A Place to Land (Equity)
- 2007: Steep Canyon Rangers - Lovin' Pretty Women (Rebel)
- 2008: Melonie Cannon - And the Wheels Turn (Rural Rhythm)
- 2008: Kenny Loggins - How About Now (BMG)
- 2008: Jeremy McComb - My Side of Town (Thirty Tigers)
- 2008: Becky Schlegel - For All the World to See (Audio & Video Labs)
- 2008: Rickey Wasson - From the Heart and Soul (Rural Rhythm)
- 2008: Hank Williams III - Damn Right, Rebel Proud (Sidewalk)
- 2009: Dierks Bentley - Feel That Fire (Capitol Nashville)
- 2009: Adam Steffey - One More for the Road (Sugar Hill)
- 2010: Dailey & Vincent - Dailey & Vincent Sing the Statler Brothers (Cracker Barrel)
- 2011: Blind Boys Of Alabama - Take the High Road (Saguaro Road)
- 2011: Sierra Hull - Daybreak (Rounder)
- 2011: Tom T. Hall - A Gift From Tom T. Hall: Tom T. Hall Sings Miss Dixie & Tom T. (Drumfire / Wrasse)
- 2012: Dierks Bentley - Home (Capitol Nashville)
- 2012 Kathy Mattea - Calling Me Home (Sugar Hill)
- 2012: The Roys - New Day Dawning (Rural Rhythm)
- 2012: Steep Canyon Rangers - Nobody Knows You (Rounder)
- 2013: John Fogerty - Wrote a Song for Everyone (Vanguard)
- 2013: The Roys - Gypsy Runaway Train (Rural Rhythm)
- 2014: Larry Cordle and Lonesome Standard Time - All-Star Duets (MightyCord)
- 2014: Dolly Parton - Blue Smoke (Masterworks)
- 2016: Irene Kelley - These Hills (Mountain Fever)
- 2016: Josh Kelley - New Lane Road (Sugar Hill)
