= Long Gone Daddy =

Compilation album by Hank Williams III
- Released: April 17, 2012
- Genre: Honky tonk; hillbilly
- Length: 33:15
- Label: Curb

Hank Williams III chronology
Attention Deficit Domination (2011)	Long Gone Daddy (2012)	Brothers of the 4×4 (2013)

Professional ratings
Review scores
Source	Rating
Allmusic	3.5/5 stars

Long Gone Daddy is an unauthorized compilation of recordings by Hank Williams III, released on April 17, 2012, through Williams' former record label Curb Records. The album, distributed without Williams' approval or knowledge, is a collection of six cover songs as well as outtakes from his first two solo albums, Risin' Outlaw and Lovesick, Broke and Driftin'.

== Track listing ==
No.	Title	Writer(s)	Length
1.	"I'm a Long Gone Daddy"	Hank Williams	3:37
2.	"Sun Comes Up"	Hank Williams III	2:55
3.	"The Bottle Let Me Down"	Merle Haggard	2:46
4.	"Wreck of the Old '97"	Norman Blake / Johnny Cash / Bob Johnson	2:56
5.	"'Neath a Cold Gray Tomb of Stone"	Williams / Mel Foree	2:52
6.	"The Wind Blew Cold"	Tomi Lunsford	2:20
7.	"Good Hearted Woman"	Waylon Jennings / Willie Nelson	4:16
8.	"This Ain't Montgomery" (with Joey Allcorn)	Joey Allcorn	4:10
9.	"What They Want Me to Be"	Williams III	3:23
10.	"If the Shoe Fits" (Shuffle Mix)	Warren Denny / Williams III	3:49
Total length:			33:15

== Release notes ==
Several of these songs have appeared on previous albums and compilation albums:

- "I'm A Long Gone Daddy" was previously released on Timeless, a tribute album to Hank Williams.
- "Sun Comes Up" was only released on III's live album, Live in Scotland. It was originally supposed to appear on Lovesick, Broke and Driftin', but after the original bass player, who originally came up with the idea of the song, left, this song was removed.
- "Wreck Of The Old 97" was previously released on the Johnny Cash tribute album Dressed in Black: A Tribute to Johnny Cash.
- "'Neath A Cold Grey Tomb Of Stone" was previously released on Three Hanks: Men with Broken Hearts.
- "This Ain't Montgomery" was originally released on Allcorn's debut album 50 Years Too Late.
- "What They Want Me to Be" is a remixed version of "Trashville" that originally appeared on Lovesick, Broke and Driftin'.
- "If The Shoe Fits" was originally released on the album Risin' Outlaw, but the "Shuffle Mix" is previously unreleased.

== Chart performance ==
Chart (2012)	Peak position
U.S. Billboard Top Country Albums	16
U.S. Billboard 200	92
