= The Best Years (disambiguation) =

The Best Years is a 2007 Canadian teen drama series set in Boston, Massachusetts

The Best Years may also refer to:

== Media ==
- List of The Best Years episodes
- The Best Years (film), a 2020 Italian film
- "The Best Years" (story), a 1948 short story by Willa Cather

== Music ==
- "Best Years", a 2020 song by 5 Seconds of Summer from the album Calm

== See also ==
- The Best Two Years, film written and directed by Scott S. Anderson
- The Best Years of Our Lives (disambiguation)
- Best of the Early Years (disambiguation)
