= Randy Howard (country singer) =

American country musician (1950–2015)

- Born: Randall Lamar Howard; May 9, 1950; Macon, Georgia, U.S.
- Died: June 9, 2015 (aged 65) Lynchburg, Tennessee, U.S.
- Genres: Country
- Occupation: Musician
- Instruments: Vocals, guitar

Randall Lamar Howard (May 9, 1950 – June 9, 2015) was an American country singer, songwriter, guitarist, and producer. His music involved outlaw country, traditional country, old southern gospel, blues and Christian country.

== Early life ==
Howard was born May 9, 1950, in Macon, Georgia.

== Career ==
Howard worked as a disk jockey and program director at WDEN radio in Macon, Georgia. He also appeared on television. He formed the company Utopian Enterprises in 1973 and produced a number of records.

As a recording artist, Howard released seven albums and CDs, all of which have charted in both national and international trade magazines. His album All American Redneck was listed in BillBoard's Top Album Picks in 1983.

As a writer, Howard's songs were recorded by The Geezinslaw Brothers, Robin Lee and Hank Williams III.

Hank Williams III's CD Straight to Hell features Randy Howard's song entitled "My Drinkin' Problem".

Howard appeared on Nashville Now, Entertainment Tonight, Good Morning America and USA Today.

On June 9, 2015, Howard was shot and killed at his home in Lynchburg, Tennessee during an altercation with bounty hunter Jackie Shell.

== Discography ==
- All American Redneck, Warner Brothers.
- Now & Then, Utopian Label
- Not Plugged In, Utopian Label
- Randy Howard, Atlantic Records
- Macon Music, Hitsound,{Europe}
- Randy Howard Live, Paul Hornsby and Randy Howard
- The Best of Randy Howard, Paul Hornsby and Randy Howard
- " A Pair of Knees", Randy Howard and Paul Hornsby. CD released 2017 posthumous by the estate of Randy Howard.
