= Hillbilly Joker =

Studio album by Hank Williams III
- Released: May 17, 2011
- Recorded: 2003
- Genres: Cowpunk; Southern metal
- Length: 31:39
- Label: Sidewalk
- Producer: Dave Sardy

Hank Williams III chronology
Rebel Within (2010)	Hillbilly Joker (2011)	Ghost to a Ghost/Gutter Town (2011)

Professional ratings
Review scores
Source	Rating
AllMusic	3.5/5 stars
PopMatters	6/10 stars
UR Chicago	3/5 stars

Hillbilly Joker is an unauthorized release of recordings by Hank Williams III. Released on May 17, 2011, the album marks a departure from Williams' previous country albums, instead featuring a cowpunk sound which incorporates elements of rockabilly, heavy metal and hardcore punk.

The album was originally recorded and planned to be released in 2003 under the title This Ain't Country, but Williams' label, Curb Records, refused to either release the album or allow him to issue it on another record label. This angered Williams so greatly that he began selling "Fuck Curb Records" T-shirts at his concerts, where he would play a number of songs from this release, notably "Hillbilly Joker" (retitled "Mississippi Highway" or "Go Fuck You"), "Life of Sin," "Hellbilly," and "Tennessee Driver." The latter track was eventually re-recorded for Williams' 2009 Assjack side project.

Eight years after This Aint Country's recording, and following Williams' 2011 acrimonious departure from the label, Curb suddenly elected to release the now-retitled album without any input from Williams, and promote it as "The New Hank Williams III Album." In response, Williams advised his fans "Don’t buy it, but get it some other way and burn the hell out of it and give it to everyone."

Two songs from the original This Aint Country track ("Hang on" and "Runnin' & Gunnin") were not included in Hillbilly Joker; however, Curb released them three years later in the album Ramblin' Man. This album was made up of previously released material, as well as outtakes and covers of other artists' songs from tribute projects. Much like Hillbilly Joker, Ramblin' Man was not authorized by Williams and his reaction to the release was to urge his fans not to buy it. Hillbilly Joker marked his last studio album to be released through Curb, and his first of five releases from the label since fulfilling his contract.

== Track listing ==
All tracks are written by Hank Williams III.

No.	Title	Length
1.	"Hillbilly Joker"	2:17
2.	"I'm Drunk Again"	3:51
3.	"Life of Sin"	3:12
4.	"10 Feet Down"	4:08
5.	"Pistol Packin'"	3:13
6.	"Tennessee Driver"	2:14
7.	"M.F.J."	2:31
8.	"Now He's Dead"	2:59
9.	"Drink It, Drug It"	3:01
10.	"Hellbilly"	4:14
Total length:		31:39

== Personnel ==
- Hank Williams III – vocals, acoustic guitar, bass guitar, composer, electric guitar
- Shawn McWilliams – drums
- Michael McCanless – fiddle
- Jason Brown – bass guitar, stand-up bass
- Duane Denison – electric guitar

== Chart positions ==
Chart (2011)	Peak position
U.S. Billboard Top Country Albums	10
U.S. Billboard 200	62
