= Mad cow (disambiguation) =

Mad cow is a common term for bovine spongiform encephalopathy, a neurodegenerative disease of cattle.

Mad cow may also refer to:

== Arts ==
- Branded (2012 film), also known as The Mad Cow
- The Mad Cows, a British band
- Mad Cow Theatre, a Florida theatre company
- "Mad Cow", a 2012 single by Hank Williams III
- Mad Cows, a 1996 novel by Kathy Lette
- Mad Cows, a 1999 film based on the 1996 novel, starring Anna Friel
- "Mad Cow Disease", a song by Goodbye Mr Mackenzie on the 1990 single "Blacker Than Black"

== Other uses ==
- Mad Cow-Girl (1961–2010), British nurse and politician
- Red Cow interchange, nicknamed Mad Cow
