= Live in Scotland =

Live album by Hank Williams III & the Damn Band
- Released: 2001
- Recorded: 20 June 2000
- Genre: Country
- Length: 42:34

Hank Williams III & the Damn Band chronology
Risin' Outlaw (1999)	Live in Scotland (2001)	Lovesick, Broke and Driftin' (2002)

Live in Scotland is a live album by Hank Williams III & the Damn Band. It was recorded at the Renfrew Ferry in Glasgow, Scotland on 20 June 2000. It was released as an officially endorsed bootleg recording by Williams III in 2001 and has since gone out of print.

== Track listing ==
No.	Title	Writer(s)	Length
1.	"Wine Spodeeodee"	Stick McGhee	4:07
2.	"Why Don't You Leave Me Alone"	Wayne Hancock	4:41
3.	"Cocaine Blues"	T. J. "Red" Arnall	3:32
4.	"I Don't Know"	Randy Howard	3:25
5.	"On My Own"	Hank Williams III	3:12
6.	"Mississippi Mud"	Williams III	3:13
7.	"The Sun Comes Up"	Williams III	3:38
8.	"Long Gone Lonesome Blues"	Hank Williams	3:13
9.	"Ramblin' Man"	Williams	3:22
10.	"Move It on Over"	Williams	3:25
11.	"If the Shoe Fits"	Warren Denny / Williams III	2:57
12.	"Trashville"	Williams III	3:56
Total length:			42:34

== Personnel ==
- Hank Williams III - vocals, guitar
- Jason Brown - upright bass
- Michael "Fiddleboy" McCanless - fiddle
- Shawn McWilliams - drums
- Duane Denison - guitar
