= Damn Right, Rebel Proud =

Studio album by Hank Williams III
- Released: October 21, 2008
- Genre: Country; psychobilly
- Length: 50:41
- Label: Sidewalk

Hank Williams III chronology
| Straight to Hell (2006) | Damn Right, Rebel Proud (2008) | Rebel Within (2010) |

Damn Right, Rebel Proud is the fourth studio album released by American country music artist Hank Williams III. It was released on October 21, 2008, through Curb's revived Sidewalk Records label. The album was released in two separate versions, one being a censored release for major retailers, the other is uncensored (AKA the Parental Advisory version). This is Hank III's most successful album to date.

== Critical reception ==
Professional ratings
Review scores
| Source | Rating |
|---|---|
| AllMusic | 3.5/5 stars |
| Los Angeles Times | 3/4 stars |
| PopMatters | 3.5/5 stars |
| Slant Magazine | 4/5 stars |
| Toronto Star | 3/4 stars |

Jonathan Keefe of Slant Magazine wrote that despite coming across as "one-note" with repetitive imagery and posturing, he praised the album for continuing the Straight to Hell formula by fusing country music conventions within a metal and art-punk context, concluding that: "Damn Right Rebel Proud seethes with an energy and a perspective that's too often lacking today, and it reaffirms that it's far more than just his name that makes Williams one of the genre's most vital artists." PopMatters contributor Julie Thanki was critical of Hank's lack of "artistic growth" and covering familiar territory throughout the record but praised him for being passionate and profound when delivering the material, singling out "P.F.F." and "3 Shades of Black" as highlights, concluding that: "If you're angry, brokenhearted, under the influence of various substances, screwed over by both your woman and The Man, and you just spilled whiskey on your favorite Misfits t-shirt, Damn Right Rebel Proud is very possibly your perfect soundtrack."

Mark Deming of AllMusic felt the album was "every bit as solid as Straight to Hell", praising Hank's "weatherbeaten twang" being added to his "updated honky tonk howl," and his band for remaining tight and enthusiastic in their performance. He criticized Hank's outlaw lyricism for repeating the same message and overplaying his hardcore tendencies that feel like he is "writing for a third-rate black metal band". Stuart Monroe of the Boston Globe felt the record contained some "fine-sounding, high-voltage country", highlighting "Wild & Free" and "Me & My Friends", and commended Hank's vocal performance for having "an eerie echo of the Hillbilly Shakespeare's." He criticized Hank's lyrical content for being "cliché-ridden and full of awkward rhymes and stilted phrasings," and overemphasizing his outlaw image.

== Track listing ==
All songs written by Hank Williams III except where noted.

| No. | Title | Length |
|---|---|---|
| 1. | "The Grand Ole Opry (Ain't So Grand)" | 2:35 |
| 2. | "Wild & Free" | 2:58 |
| 3. | "Me & My Friends" | 3:12 |
| 4. | "Six Pack of Beer" | 2:32 |
| 5. | "I Wish I Knew" | 3:30 |
| 6. | "If You Can't Help Your Own" | 3:32 |
| 7. | "Candidate for Suicide" | 3:41 |
| 8. | "H8 Line" | 3:12 |
| 9. | "Long Hauls & Close Calls" | 2:43 |
| 10. | "Stoned & Alone" | 5:12 |
| 11. | "P.F.F." | 10:01 |
| 12. | "3 Shades of Black" | 4:18 |
| 13. | "Workin' Man" (Bob Wayne) | 3:01 |
| Total length: | | 50:41 |

== Personnel ==
- Hank Williams III – acoustic guitar, electric guitar, drums, vocals, instrumentation
- Joe Buck – stand-up bass
- Chris Carmichael – fiddle
- Charlie Cushman – banjo
- Andy Gibson – Dobro
- Donnie Herron – fiddle
- Johnny Hiland – electric guitar
- Randy Kohrs – acoustic guitar, Dobro
- Adam McOwen – fiddle, accordion
- Shawn McWilliams – drums
- Gary Sommers – fiddle
- Marty Stuart – mandolin, electric guitar
- Bob Wayne – bass, guitar, vocals

=== Technical personnel ===
- Hank Williams III – engineer
- Jim Lightman – engineer
- Keith Neltner – design, illustrations
- Jennifer Tzar – photography
- Taylor Norrell – Brewmaster

== Charts ==
| Chart (2008) | Peak position |
|---|---|
| US Billboard 200 | 18 |
| US Top Country Albums (Billboard) | 2 |
