= The Bluegrass Diaries =

Studio album by Jim Lauderdale
- Released: September 18, 2007
- Genre: Bluegrass music
- Label: Yep Roc
- Producer: Randy Kohrs

Professional ratings
Review scores
Source	Rating
Allmusic	4/5 stars

The Bluegrass Diaries is an album by Jim Lauderdale, released through Yep Roc Records on September 18, 2007. In 2008, the album won Lauderdale the Grammy Award for Best Bluegrass Album.

== Track listing ==
1. "This Is the Last Time (I'm Ever Gonna Hurt)" (Odie Blackmon, Jim Lauderdale) – 3:01
2. "All Roads Lead Back to You" (Lauderdale, Melba Montgomery) – 2:17
3. "I Wanted to Believe" (Lauderdale) – 3:41
4. "Looking for a Good Place to Land" (Shawn Camp, Lauderdale) – 3:32
5. "Can We Find Forgiveness" (Lauderdale) – 3:00
6. "Chances" (Odie Blackmon, Lauderdale) – 3:16
7. "One Blue Mule" (Lauderdale) – 2:31
8. "Are You Having Second Thoughts" (Paul Craft, Lauderdale) – 3:52
9. "My Somewhere Just Got Here" (Lauderdale, JD Souther) – 2:34
10. "It's Such a Long Journey Home" (Lauderdale, Candace Randolph) – 2:56
11. "Ain't No Way to Run" (Lauderdale, Melba Montgomery) – 5:11

== Personnel ==
- Richard Bailey – banjo
- Gina R. Binkley – design
- Ashley Brown – vocal harmony
- Shawn Camp – guitar
- Cia Cherry Holmes – vocal harmony
- Jesse Cobb – mandolin
- Dave Evans – vocal harmony
- Clay Hess – guitar
- Cody Kilby – guitar
- Randy Kohrs – Dobro, producer, engineer, mixing, vocal harmony
- Michael Latterell – engineer
- Jim Lauderdale – composer
- Randy LeRoy – mastering
- David McClister – photography
- Aaron Till – fiddle
