= Davisson Brothers Band =

American country music band

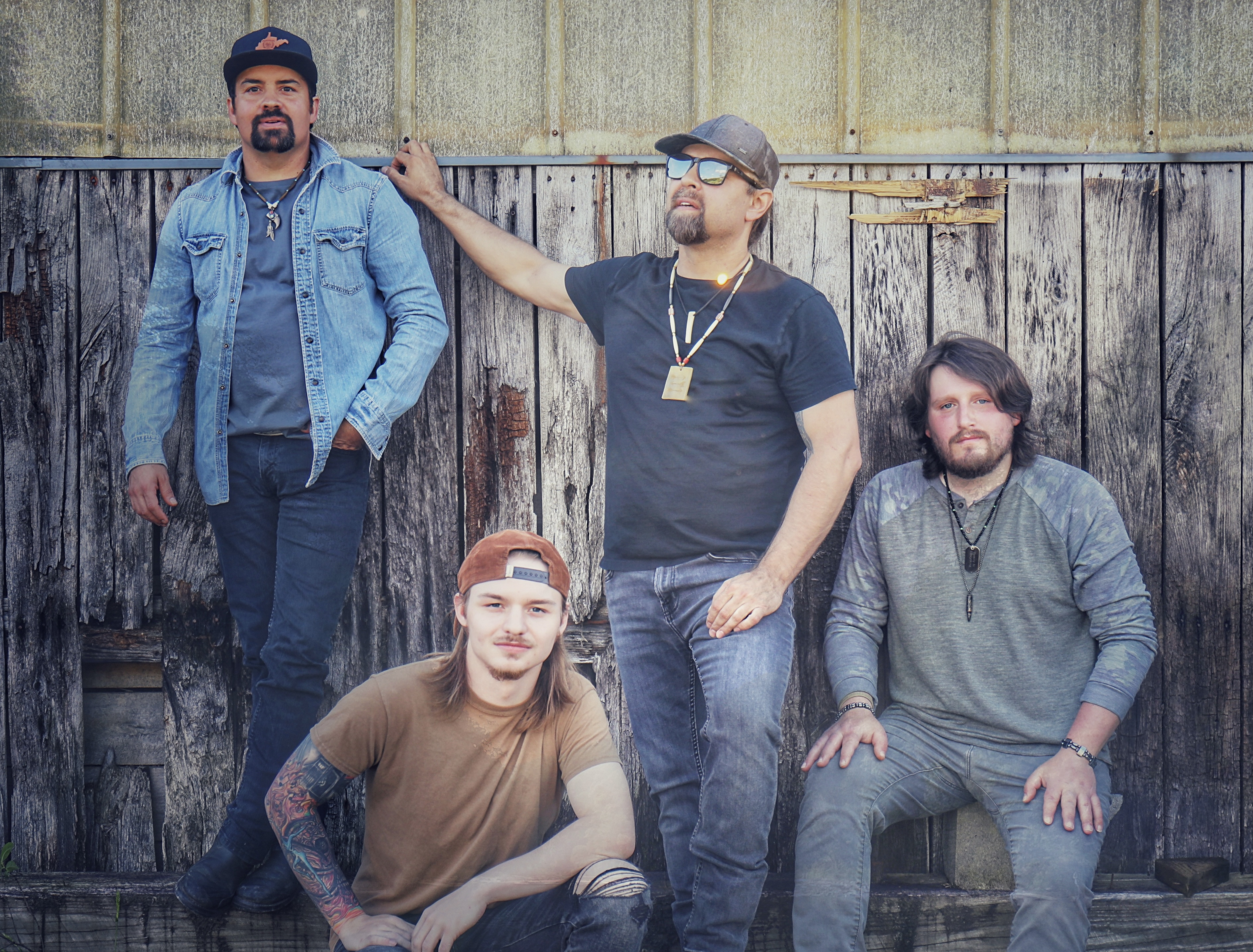
- Davisson Brothers Band, based out of Nashville, TN, and originally from Clarksburg, West Virginia

Background information
- Origin: Clarksburg, West Virginia, United States
- Genre: Country
- Years active: 2006–present
- Labels: Erv Woolsey Management Company; Dreamlined Entertainment Group; Star Farm Nashville; Sony Red Nashville; United Talent Agency
- Members: Chris Davisson; Donnie Davisson; Gerrod Bee; Aaron Regester
- Past members: Sammy Davisson; Jim Kuras; Pat Sutton; Kevin Costello; Matt Herod; Rus Reppert
- Website: Official site

Davisson Brothers Band is an American country music group, "from the hills of West Virginia", composed of brothers Chris Davisson (lead guitar, slide guitar), and Donnie Davisson (lead vocals, rhythm guitar), Gerrod Bee (bass guitar, background vocals), and long-time friend Aaron Regester (drums). Drew Riley is their current drummer, and has been on tour with the Davisson Brothers since January 2026.

== Always On Tour ==
The Davisson Brothers Band signed to CharTunes/Yell Records in 2009, with E1 Music (Formerly Koch Distribution) serving as distributor. Their self-titled debut album was released March 10, 2009, and was co-produced by David Hanner of the duo Corbin/Hanner. Its lead-off single, "Foot Stompin'", has charted on Billboard Hot Country Songs. The album itself reached No. 40 on Top Country Albums and No. 26 on Top Heatseekers.

In 2011, the Davisson Brothers Band signed with William Morris Endeavor for representation.

In 2012, the Davisson Brothers Band signed with the accomplished Erv Woolsey and the Erv Woolsey Management Company. Also this year, long time friend, local West Virginian, former MLB player and current ESPN commentator John Kruk approached Chris and Donnie about writing a new theme song for John's current ESPN show Baseball Tonight. Nashville songwriter Phil O'Donnell helped write the song along with John, Chris and Donnie. The song "Baseball Tonight", which includes Kruk singing and performing, opened the show and was later digitally released.

In 2013, the Davisson Brothers Band, partnered with their friend, West Virginia Mountaineers football legend, and NFL player Owen Schmitt and opened "Schmitt's Saloon and Davisson Brothers Band Music Hall" in Morgantown, West Virginia to be their music hub at home. Later this year the music video for the un-released single "Country Just Like Me", was shot by Nashville director Steve Condon, which included cameos by Owen Schmitt, famed bluegrass musician Del McCoury and other Nashville musicians and friends.

In 2014, the Davisson Brothers Band signed with experienced radio promotion executives Michael Powers and Matt Corbin and their newly launched promotions label, Star Farm Nashville, and also with the multi-faceted services label Sony Red Nashville. Also, this year it was announced that the guys had been in development of a reality TV show with director Steve Condon and his production company the 10:10 Creative and producer Sandra J. Smith, whom was working for Vince Vaughn's production company Wild West Picture Show Productions. In November, the Davisson Brothers Band, released their new single "Jesse James" on iTunes and Google Play. The single was recorded in Nashville and produced by Grammy Award-winning producer Keith Stegall and producer Brian David Willis. Soon after, SiriusXM’s "The Highway (Sirius XM)" began playing the single globally.

In early 2015, the Davisson Brothers Band released the music video for the new single. The music video for "Jesse James" was directed by Steve Condon and premiered on Sirius XM's the Highway. The video was later released and aired on CMT, Great American Country and Vevo. The video included cameos from the iconic American Wall of Death riders, to Erv Woolsey, Michael Powers, Matt Corbin and Owen Schmitt. Soon after with The Highway's listeners immediately taking to the song and requesting its way into the Hot 45, the track next made its way to terrestrial radio, securing the title of one of the most added songs for the week of January 20, 2015. In the spring, once again, John Kruk, ESPN Sunday Night Baseball analyst, called on the Davisson Brothers Band to record a special track, titled ‘Right Here on ESPN,’ for the ESPN telecast “opens” during the July 4 weekend. The track was recorded by John and the entire band and ESPN cameras filmed video sequences that aired nationally all 4 July weekend on ESPN's special holiday weekend coverage.

In 2016, the Davisson Brothers Band moved on from William Morris Endeavor and signed with United Talent Agency and the Nashville office of UTA Music. Also around this time, long time friend, literal cousin and band bassist, Sammy Davisson, left the band to begin a solo career on lead guitar and lead vocals. Sammy was replaced by one of the original band members, Russell Reppert. In December 2016, the band announced, via a video post, that they had just signed a record deal with Keith Stegall and his new label, Dreamlined Entertainment Group.

In May 2017, brothers Chris and Donnie got to be a part of long time friend of the band Chris Janson’s new music video for his new song, “Fix a Drink”. The music video was directed by Michael Monaco and premiered on CMT, Great American Country and CMT Music in July 2017. In October 2017, it was announced, on a CMC Rocks social media site with a video post that the band's new single, "Po' Boyz", was digitally released in Australia on iTunes/Australia. A US release date for the new single and new untitled album has not been announced. Before the announcement of the release of "Po' Boyz", once again the band partnered with director Steve Condon and the 10:10 Creative, along with producer Kevin Lapsley, to shoot the music video for the new single. The music video will have cameos by musicians Mike Morningstar and Jim Beer, along with Davis & Elkins College Appalachian Ensemble, and many more local friends from West Virginia. A release date for the music video has not been announced. Soon after, it was announced by the band that they would be traveling overseas in March 2018 to take part in their first international dates as part of the CMC Rocks 2018 music festival lineup in Willowbank, Ipswich, Queensland, Australia.

== Discography ==
=== Studio albums ===
Title	Album details	Peak chart positions			Sale
Title	Album details	US Country	US Heat	US Indie	Sale
Davisson Brothers Band	Release date: March 10, 2009; Label: CharTunes/Yell Records	40	26	—	
Fighter	Release date: May 25, 2018; Label: Dreamlined/Star Farm	—	3	20	US: 1,100
"—" denotes releases that did not chart

=== Singles ===
Year	Single	Peak chart positions	Album
Year	Single	US Country	Album
2009	"Foot Stompin'"	55	Davisson Brothers Band
2009	"Big City Hillbilly"	—	Davisson Brothers Band
2013	"Country Just Like Me"	—	NA
2015	"Jesse James"	—	NA
2018	"Po' Boyz"	—	Fighter
"—" denotes releases that did not chart

=== Music videos ===
Year	Video	Director
2008	"Found Dead on a Fence Line"	Nevermore Production Studios
2013	"Country Just Like Me"	Steve Condon
2015	"Jesse James"	Steve Condon
2017	"Po' Boyz"	Steve Condon
2018	"Get Down South"	Kevin J. Lapsley
