= Where Do I Go from You =

Single by Clay Walker

from the album She Won't Be Lonely Long
- Released: August 2, 2010
- Genre: Country
- Length: 3:28
- Label: Curb
- Songwriters: Don Cook, Clint Daniels, Ryan Tyndell
- Producer: Keith Stegall

Clay Walker singles chronology
"She Won't Be Lonely Long" (2009)	"Where Do I Go from You" (2010)	"Like We Never Said Goodbye" (2012)

"Where Do I Go from You" is a song written by Don Cook, Clint Daniels and Ryan Tyndell and recorded by American country music singer Clay Walker. It was released in August 2010 as the second single to his album She Won't Be Lonely Long. It peaked at #26 on the Billboard Hot Country Singles & Tracks charts, becoming his 28th top 40 hit on the chart.

== Background ==
Prior to "Where Do I Go from You" being released as a single, Walker expressed that he thought "Summer Song" would be a better choice. He explained in an interview with CMT, "There can only be one boss, and we know who that is. But it's OK. That's the way it goes." In an interview with GAC, Walker explained the song by saying, "Out of all the songs I've recorded since "What's It To You," my first record, this has that youthful energy I had on that first song. Production-wise it's as modern as anything I've ever done. I'm pretty much considered a new traditionalist, but I do have R&B and pop roots mixed in." Walker told the Albuquerque Journal, "I like the new single that's out right now because it's musically just one of those songs you can groove to right away. It's not one that you have to think about. So I like the fact that my record label picked it as the follow-up."

== Content ==
"Where Do I Go from You" is about a man who is not sure what to do anymore after his girlfriend has left him. He tries to forget about her but her memory keeps coming back to him and he remains lost about where to go from her.

== Critical reception ==
Karlie Justus of Engine 145 gave the song a thumbs up rating. She described the song as "pairing a well-crafted melody with a solid, engaging performance that’s both a throwback to the singer’s heyday and a worthwhile contribution to contemporary country." Matt Bjorke of Roughstock gave the song four-and-a-half stars and described it as having "an interesting lyric and an interesting and solid mainstream melody." Alison Bonaguro of CMT gave the song a positive remark writing "With mandolin and steel behind him, he seems to have one-upped himself musically and vocally."

Amanda Johnson of Digital Rodeo wrote "His emotional tenor and strong country vocals keep the future alive for this great artist and his new single. I predict he has his next Top 5 on the line and maybe a #1?" The website Urban Country Blog gave the song a positive review writing "With radio making a slight shift to more traditional material again, a grown-up break-up song such as this should do well."

== Chart performance ==
"Where Do I Go from You" debuted at number 60 on the U.S. Billboard Hot Country Songs chart dated August 14, 2010, and reached a peak of number 26 in March 2011.

=== Charts ===
Chart (2010–2011)	Peak position
US Hot Country Songs (Billboard)	26

=== Year-end charts ===
Chart (2011)	Position
US Country Songs (Billboard)	99
