= Wyatt (band) =

Canadian country music band formed 2004

WYATT
- Origin: Saskatoon, Saskatchewan, Canada
- Genres: Country
- Years active: 2004–present
- Labels: Wyatt Music
- Members: Scott Patrick; Daniel Fortier; Bray Hudson; Cam Ewart
- Past members: Sean Dancey; Roy Sydidah
- Website: Official website

Wyatt is a Canadian country music group from Saskatoon, Saskatchewan composed of Scott Patrick (vocals, guitar), Daniel Fortier (vocals, guitar), Bray Hudson (drums) and Cam Ewart (bass). Following the release of a Christmas album, Snowed In, in 2005, Wyatt released their debut album, Hard Road, in 2007. No singles were released from the project because the band "didn't feel it was quite there yet."

In June 2009, Wyatt won Big Dog 92.7's The Next Big Thing talent contest. Their prize included $5,000 cash, a showcase for music industry professionals, career guidance, a trip to the Canadian Country Music Association Awards and the option of having a professional single released to radio. Their single "Ride On" debuted at No. 48 on the Billboard Canadian Country Singles chart in December 2009. A second single, "Questions," reached the Top 40 in May 2010. Both songs are included on Wyatt's second studio album, If I Had a Dollar…, released in June 2010.

== Discography ==
=== Studio albums ===
Title	Details
Snowed In	Release date: October 17, 2005; Label: self-released
Hard Road	Release date: October 15, 2007; Label: self-released
If I Had a Dollar…	Release date: June 1, 2010; Label: Road Angel
Shoulda Been Here Last Night…	Release date: October 22, 2013; Label: MDM Recordings

=== Singles ===
Year	Single	Album
2009	"Next to You"	If I Had a Dollar…
2009	"Ride On"	If I Had a Dollar…
2010	"Questions"	If I Had a Dollar…
2010	"Airplanes"	If I Had a Dollar…
2011	"The Mess in Me"	If I Had a Dollar…
2013	"Jesse James"	Shoulda Been Here Last Night…
2013	"Roll the Windows Down"	Shoulda Been Here Last Night…
2014	"Always Tonight"	Shoulda Been Here Last Night…

=== Music videos ===
Year	Video	Director
2013	"Jesse James"	Tony Hrynchuk
2013	"Roll the Windows Down"	Raj Padmanabh
