= Assjack =

American metal band

- Origin: Gridley, California, U.S.
- Genres: Thrash metal; death metal; hardcore punk; metalcore
- Years active: 1999–present
- Members: Hank Williams III; Garrett Bremer
- Past members: Christopher Arp; Kevin Bond; Joe Fazzio; Tim Yeung; Gary Lindsey; Munash Sami; Joe Buck; Duane Denison

Assjack is an American heavy metal band led by Hank Williams III and Garrett Bremer. The band is one of the three incarnations of Williams' live show, and started off playing music throughout 2008 to 2010, until they evolved into a strictly punk metal band.

== Career ==
For Assjack's long-anticipated 2009 self-titled studio debut, only Williams sang and played all instruments on the recording.

For live purposes, the band features Gary Lindsey on vocals, Hank Williams III on guitar and vocals, and Joe Buck who used to be on bass but is now focused on his solo career. Assjack has had a revolving drum slot and background vocalist slot throughout the years. On recent tours, Chris Arp has played lead guitar.

Hank III confirmed in a November 10, 2009 interview that no new Assjack material is in the works because of being held back by Curb Records so long. Hank III also stated that after Curb is dropped (after the release of his 2010 solo album Rebel Within) that he would be taking his music and Assjack's music to the next level.

== Musical style ==
Their musical style has been described as thrash metal, death metal, hardcore punk, and metalcore.

== Discography ==
=== Studio albums ===
Title	Album details	Peak chart positions		
Title	Album details	US Hard Rock	US Rock	US
Assjack	Release date: August 4, 2009; Label: Curb Records	11	32	92

=== Singles ===
Year	Single	Album
2009	"Redneck Ride"	Assjack

=== Music videos ===
Year	Video	Director
2009	"Redneck Ride"	Dave Prewitt

== Members ==
=== Current members ===
- Hank Williams III – vocals, guitar
- Gary Lindsey – co-vocals for the Damn Band and Assjack
- Garrett Bremer – drums

=== Touring and former members ===
- Christopher Arp (Psyopus) – guitar
- Kevin Bond – guitar
- Zach Shedd – bass
- Joe Fazzio – drums
- Brian Poskochil – co-vocals
- Tim Yeung (Hate Eternal / Vital Remains) – drums
- Munesh Sami – drums
- Joe Buck – bass
- Grahm Reynolds
