= Like We Never Said Goodbye =

Single by Clay Walker

from the album She Won't Be Lonely Long
- Released: January 16, 2012
- Genre: Country
- Length: 3:01
- Label: Curb
- Songwriters: Cory Batten, Tiffany Goss
- Producer: Keith Stegall

Clay Walker singles chronology
"Where Do I Go from You" (2010)	"Like We Never Said Goodbye" (2012)	"Jesse James" (2012)

"Like We Never Said Goodbye" is a song written by Cory Batten and Tiffany Goss and recorded by American country music singer Clay Walker. It was released in January 2012 as the third second single to his album She Won't Be Lonely Long. It is also the 32nd single of Walker's career.

== Background ==
The song was written after a reunion of the two songwriters Cory Batten and Tiffany Goss after working together previously on the song "Down by the River" on the Brooks and Dunn album "Hillbilly Deluxe". Batten told the website "Taste of Country", "We hadn’t really written together for about a year and a half after that, maybe. Tiffany and I have always been really close friends. We saw each other at a restaurant, and was like, ‘Hey! It’s like we never said goodbye, hanging out together!’ We were like, ‘There’s our next song right there!’" He also said, "The only hard part that I remember I remember about this song was where to take it if he did sit down next to her. What would be the next logical thing that happens? How do you break that ice and start talking again? I knew I wanted it to have a snowball effect with the story. You see each other, and then this happens and this happens and this happens … like a snowball effect, where they’re together at the end. Like if I hadn’t of walked back in, then we would have never sat down to talk. If we hadn’t sat down to talk, we would never have had that glass of wine." Batten also revealed, "Clay told me after he heard it, he knew immediately that he wanted to cut it. He’s always told me that he’s been a big fan of the song, and he was instrumental in making sure that it was going to be a single. He said he believed in it as much as any song that he has ever recorded."

== Content ==
"Like We Never Said Goodbye" is about a man who by chance runs into an old flame at a bar and begins talking to her despite originally feeling uncomfortable about the encounter. After talking, the man and his ex begin communicating like the old times when they were together. The bar closes after a long time talking and they talk about getting back together and trying the relationship again.

== Live performances ==
Walker performed the song on The Rachael Ray Show on December 23, 2011. He also performed the song on The Bachelor on January 23.

== Reception ==
Billy Dukes of Taste of Country gave the song a four and a half stars out of five. He wrote, "Like We Never Said Goodbye’ relies on a unique meter, a sort of bouncy shuffle that is familiar because we’re familiar with Walker, but otherwise totally original. It may not be a song that makes a great first impression, but in its own sneaky way it becomes an ear worm." Tara Seetharam of Country Universe gave the song an A− rating and said, "As with the best Walker singles, there’s an intangible sparkle somewhere within its melody, pulse and sparse piano lines – evocative enough to match the magnitude of rediscovered love, but gentle enough to remind us that country music is about finding the magic in the simplest of stories." Bobby Peacock of "Roughstock" in his album review of "She Won't Be Lonely Long" wrote, "Although Clay's voice sounds a bit strained on the higher notes of "Like We Never Said Goodbye," the lyrics are flowing, conversational and detailed." Writers at "Country Your Way" wrote, "Like is a very catchy love ballad that is reminiscent of Walker’s hits in the mid 1990s. Well written and extremely well performed, Like should be able to connect with many people and remind them of their loves and loves lost."

== Chart performance ==
"Like We Never Said Goodbye" debuted at number 57 on the U.S. Billboard Hot Country Songs chart dated December 3, 2011 after unsolicited airplay. The song re-entered the chart at number 60 for the week of January 14.

=== Charts ===
Chart (2011–12)	Peak position
US Hot Country Songs (Billboard)	46
