= Vernon Derrick =

Musician

Vernon Derrick (November 7, 1933 – January 4, 2008) was an American musician and entertainer. Derrick may best be remembered as a fiddle and mandolin player of Hank Williams Jr.'s Bama Band in the 1980s.

== Personal life ==
Derrick was born in Grant, Alabama, in 1933 and was a resident of Arab, Alabama, since 1941. Derrick began his professional career in music as a teenager, playing a short stint with Flatt and Scruggs, and then enlisted in the United States Army. After a long career, Derrick died from heart and kidney failure at Marshall Medical Center North, Marshall County, Alabama on January 4, 2008, and was interred at Mount Oak Cemetery, near Arab, Alabama.

== Musical career ==
Derrick recorded and toured with the Stanley Brothers and played both fiddle and mandolin on the original sessions of such Hank Williams, Jr. hits as "All My Rowdy Friends Have Settled Down" and "A Country Boy Can Survive". He has been recognized by The Alabama Music Hall of Fame as an Achiever. He was also a longtime member of Jimmy Martin's bluegrass band 1964–1970 and off and on in the decades that followed. While working with the Jimmy Martin and the Sunny Mountain Boys, Derrick wrote "The Arab Bounce" and "Big Country", two classic bluegrass favorites which have been performed and recorded by several bluegrass artists and groups. His career included numerous appearances on the Grand Ole Opry and Midnight Jamboree with several different bands. Derrick played fiddle for Hank III & The Damn Band from 1995 to 1999. Many country and bluegrass fans and musicians believe that Vernon Derrick was a musical stylist who was ahead of his time in the field of bluegrass music.

== Discography ==
- Buckskin (Derrick Records DR 001, 1972)
- Grass Country (Revonah Records R-906, 1972)
- Vernon Derrick Plays Jimmy Martin's Hottest Hits (Alpine Recording Company 46680, 1980)
