= She Won't Be Lonely Long (song) =

Single by Clay Walker

from the album She Won't Be Lonely Long
- Released: December 7, 2009
- Genre: Country
- Length: 3:25
- Label: Asylum-Curb
- Songwriters: Galen Griffin; Doug Johnson; Phil O'Donnell
- Producer: Keith Stegall

Clay Walker singles chronology
"She Likes It in the Morning" (2008)	"She Won't Be Lonely Long" (2009)	"Where Do I Go from You" (2010)

Music video
- "She Won't Be Lonely Long" at CMT.com

"She Won't Be Lonely Long" is a song written by Galen Griffin, Doug Johnson and Phil O'Donnell, and recorded by American country music artist Clay Walker. It was released in December 2009 as the first single and title track from his album She Won't Be Lonely Long. It is his most successful charting single since "The Chain of Love" in 2000.

== Background ==
Walker said, “I wanted the first single off my forthcoming album to reflect the work I’ve been doing to become the artist I want to be. ‘She Won’t Be Lonely Long’ is an example of these steps and this work.” He also said, “Lyrically, it is a song that resonates with both women and men because we all want to look our best once we are unexpectedly ‘back on the market.’”

Walker also stated in another interview that he was attracted to the song saying, "I'm a believer in songs people can dance to, more of those songs tend to be hits. When I first heard the song on a demo, it made me feel like dancing. The melody was very infectious and the beat was good, and I thought that the lyric was just outstanding." Walker told Country Weekly, "It's rare that you can find a song that has a melody and lyric that are equally strong. Usually one is going to out weigh the other, but in this case it's hard to tell what I like more, the melody or the lyric."

In an interview with GAC Walker explained the song by saying, "I've played in bars my whole life. As a singer, you have a bird's eye view of everyone in the club. When a good-looking woman walks in, you notice it. What makes it so real is that if a guy does a girl wrong, the first thing she wants to do is go out, look great, show him that you're not the best I ever had, I'm the best YOU ever had."

Walker told the Yuma Sun, "What I like about it most is the lyrics about a good girl who has been done wrong. It talks about her being hot and how she gets all dolled up and won't be lonely long. I used to work at clubs a lot before I had a record contract and I had a bird's-eye view of this exact situation dozens of times where the girl comes in and gets out on the dance floor and makes the guy eat his heart out because he realizes he's lost the best thing he was ever going to have. Women love it."

== Content ==
"She Won't Be Lonely Long" is a moderate up-tempo song, featuring accompaniment from electric guitar and piano. The song deals with a male narrator's fascination with a woman whose lover had just left her (i.e. "the way she's dancin' and drinkin' chilled Patron.") He also plans to date the woman, stating that "if she's lonely now, she won't be lonely long."

== Critical reception ==
Matt Bjorke of Roughstock gave the song a favorable review. He described it as "a laid-back single that finds Walker not only in fine voice but singing a solid country song about how you can read body language and social cues of a woman who has stepped out on a lonely relationship to test the waters." The Associated Press wrote "if the song has the laid-back, steel-guitar lope of an old-school '90s hit, well, that only makes Walker's return more welcome." Kevin John Coyne of Country Universe listed "She Won't Be Lonely Long" as the 22nd best single of 2010 and wrote, "ringing with effortless charisma and playful sincerity, the lead single off Walker’s latest album was a welcomed reintroduction to his most beloved qualities." Kyle Ward of Roughstock listed the song as the 17th best single of 2010 and wrote, "A surprise hit that gives me hope that 90’s country isn’t dead and buried just yet."

== Live performances ==
In December 2010 Walker also performed "She Won't Be Lonely Long" on The Fran Drescher Show. Walker also performed the song on Fox News on June 11, 2010, and on Lopez Tonight on July 13, 2010.

== Music video ==
A music video was filmed for the song on April 9, 2010. Directed by Marcel, the video shows Walker walking on the beach, singing the song. It also features him, on a farm, filming a woman with a camcorder. The woman in the video is Walker's wife Jessica. The music video was filmed at Walker's ranch in Tennessee and his horses were also featured in the video. Walker stated in an interview with The Boot, "It was great making the video there. Being in love does make everything sweeter. And before we knew it, making that video, the day was over. It went by that fast!"

During a behind the scenes look at the making of the video Walker stated he and Marcel, "got together and said let's shoot this video together, so we co-directed it. One of the things that came to mind was the Twilight movies where there is so much intensity built in through glances and looks being in the woods and I said hey man I think it would be kind of cool if we put a horse in the video that is just running free, more or less behind us and so we put Pearl in there.

== Chart performance ==
"She Won't Be Lonely Long" debuted at number 59 on the Hot Country Songs chart dated November 28, 2009, about a week before its initial release date. It peaked at number 4 on that chart, Walker's highest-peaking single since his 2000 single, "The Chain of Love". It also debuted at number 99 on the Billboard Hot 100 for the chart dated April 17, 2010.

=== Charts ===
Chart (2009–2010)	Peak position
US Hot Country Songs (Billboard)	4
US Billboard Hot 100	53

=== Year-end charts ===
Chart (2010)	Rank
U.S. Billboard Hot Country Songs	10

== Certifications ==
Region	Certification	Certified units/sales
United States (RIAA)	2× Platinum	2,000,000^{‡}
^{‡} Sales+streaming figures based on certification alone.
