= Those Poor Bastards =

American gothic country band

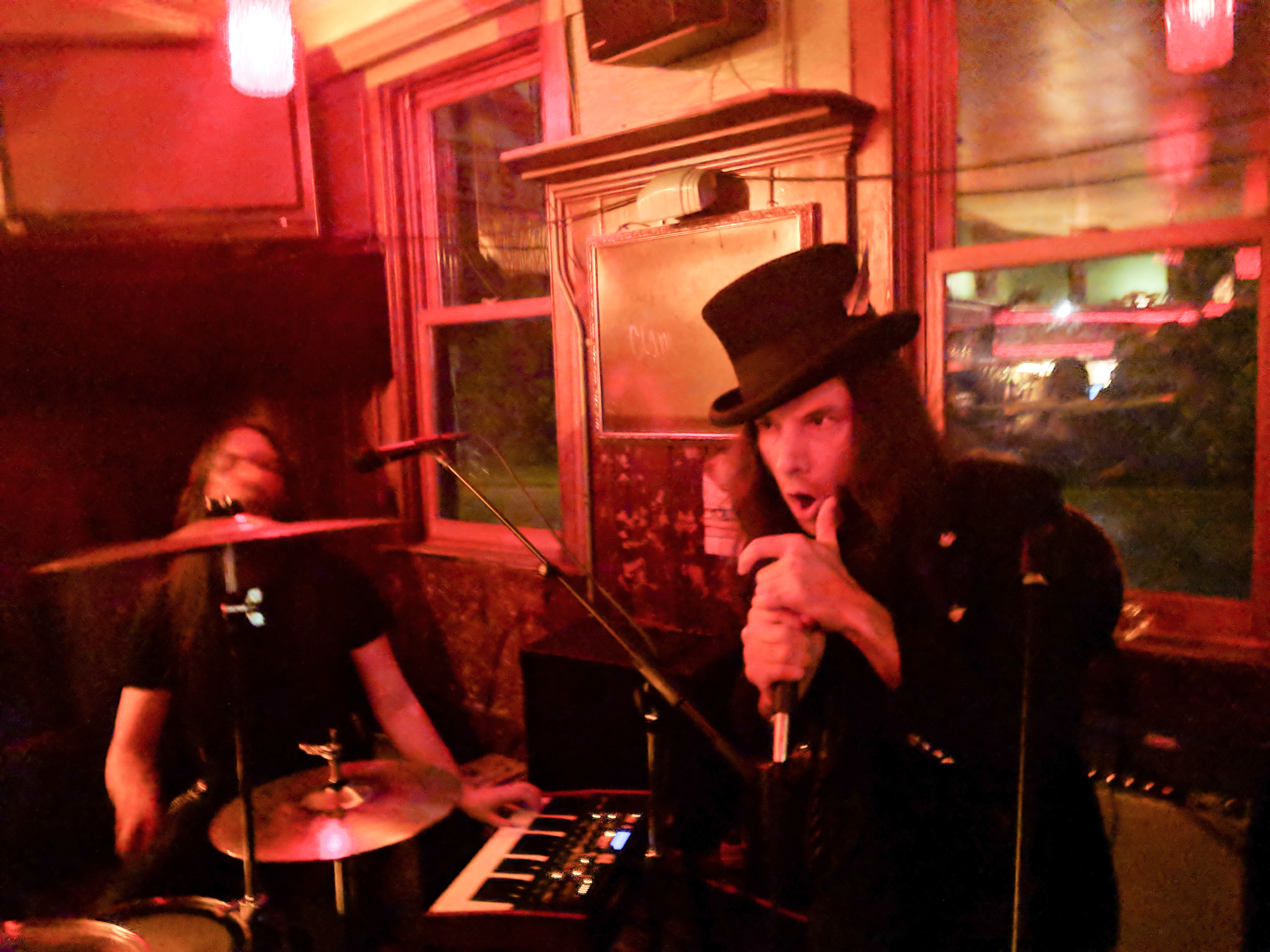

Background information
- Origin: Madison, Wisconsin, United States
- Genre: Gothic country
- Years active: 2004–present
- Label: Tribulation Recording Co.
- Members: Lonesome Wyatt; The Minister

Those Poor Bastards are an American gothic country duo based in Madison, Wisconsin. Since 2004, they have released sixteen full-length studio albums and six EPs, and have toured in both North America and Europe.

The band is composed of Lonesome Wyatt (vocals, guitar) and The Minister (banjo, bass, percussion, backing vocals). The duo reveal very little information about themselves.

== Background ==
Lonesome Wyatt vaguely described his childhood as very isolated, having few friends at school and "going the whole summer" without seeing them, and that his parents "were insane". He attended Stoughton High School (Wisconsin), graduating in 1997. Inspired by Nick Cave and Johnny Cash, he began to record music in his parents' basement, where he began a solo gothic folk project called Lonesome Wyatt and the Holy Spooks before disbanding it in 2002, although the group was later revived in 2010.

== History ==
While looking for a band name in the early 2000s, Wyatt discovered the phrase "those poor bastards" in a book, and decided to use it as the name for his band formed with another unidentified member known as The Minister. In late 2005, his father was alleged to have contacted him for fear that he was a werewolf because he could not remember where he had gotten mud on his shoes. Wyatt has been questioned about the incident in various interviews.

The Minister veils his face in all official band photography, does not perform live and has not revealed his identity. He has, however, played live performances, as well as appearing older official photos. For live performances, Wyatt performs with a third musician, Vincent Presley, on drums and keyboard. At live shows, Presley is known to play the keyboard with drums simultaneously.

Their song "Pills I Took" was covered by Hank Williams III on his album Straight to Hell.

== Musical style and influences ==
Those Poor Bastards has been described as gothic country. The band performs a style that derives from gothic rock and traditional Americana, often with themes in the genre of murder ballads. Their lyrics focus on themes of sin, damnation, misery, religion and death.

== Discography ==
Studio albums

- Songs of Desperation (2005)
- Hellfire Hymns (2007)
- The Plague (2008)
- Satan Is Watching (2008)
- Gospel Haunted (2010)
- Behold the Abyss (2012)
- Vicious Losers (2014)
- Sing It Ugly (2016)
- Necrosphere (2016)
- Inhuman Nature (2018)
- Evil Seeds (2019)
- Old Time Suffering (2021)
- God Awful (2022)
- Back to the Primitive (2024)
- Black Tongue (2026)

EPs

- Country Bullshit (2004)
- Pills I Took (2006) (split with Hank Williams III)
- Black Dog Yodel (2009)
- Abominations (2009)
- Gospel Outtakes (2010)
- Is This Hell? (2011)
