= Jesse James (Clay Walker song) =

Single by Clay Walker

from the album She Won't Be Lonely Long
- Released: September 17, 2012
- Recorded: 2009
- Genre: Country
- Length: 4:20
- Label: Curb/Sidewalk
- Songwriters: Ben Glover, Kyle Jacobs, Joe Leathers
- Producer: Keith Stegall

Clay Walker singles chronology
"Like We Never Said Goodbye" (2011)	"Jesse James" (2012)	"Right Now" (2015)

"Jesse James" is a song recorded by American country music artist Clay Walker. It was released in September 2012 as the fourth single from his 2010 studio album, She Won't Be Lonely Long. The song was written by Ben Glover, Kyle Jacobs, and Joe Leathers. The song has also been performed by the group the Davisson Brothers Band and by Wyatt.

== Background ==
"Jesse James" first appeared in February 2010 on the "She Won't Be Lonely Long" extended play. In August 2011 Walker first mentioned the song as a new single even though it would be another year before it was released.

Walker told Great American Country "It's like when Tim McGraw sang, ‘I may be a real bad boy, but baby, I'm a real good man.' I think most men are in that spot. It also reminds me of ‘Tombstone,' with Val Kilmer and Kurt Russell, which is one of my favorite movies. I ad-libbed some lines from it at the end of the song."

In an interview with the "Laughlin Entertainer", Walker said, "What's unique about "Jesse James" is it's got a rockin' edge to it. I grew up singing rowdy music in bars. I may be at a rebirth or a re- imaging of my career. And what a way to start it out a song about an outlaw with a very rockin' edge. It's a new beginning for me. It's time for me to get over the boyish love song stuff and get into the rougher manly things."

== Content ==
The up-tempo song is about a man who despite being raised right sometimes just wants to be bad like the old-west outlaw Jesse James. The man has a constant fight between good and evil when choosing to be like Jesus or Jesse James.

== Critical reception ==
In the album review for "She Won't Be Lonely Long", Bobby Peacock of Roughstock wrote, "For an artist who rarely cuts up-tempos Jesse James is a serious gamble that pays off. Matt Bjorke also of Roughstock wrote, "It's a fun song that is contemporary yet feels like something that could've been released by Clay Walker when he was at the height of his radio stardom in the 1990s. It mixes in some high lonesome styles in the chorus that sounds great too." Billy Dukes of "Taste of Country" gave the song a 3 star rating and wrote, the song is "an adventure that’s fun and unique."

== Music video ==
The music video began filming in August 2012 and was finished on August 22. It was directed by Thadd Turner and co-directed by Walker. The video was filmed in Santa Fe New Mexico at the Bonanza Creek Ranch. It is an old west inspired video featuring Eat'n Park spokes model Sarah Marince as a saloon girl as well as Walker's wife Jessica playing a character named "Blue". The video premiered on October 19.

Walker described the music video by saying "When we shot the video we used the movie set out of Santa Fe that they used for Cowboys & Aliens. We did it in cinematic we spent the money to get that western look. Jesse James robbed trains so we went to this old train station and we used this black train and we had saloon girls dancing all over the train with my band there playing. It was sexy. It got me fired up about doing a movie. I'm going to brush up on my acting skills, take some classes in L.A., get some coaching. I think it would be fun."

== Charts ==
Chart (2012)	Peak position
US Country Airplay (Billboard)	48
US Hot Country Songs (Billboard)	57
