= Brothers of the 4×4 =

Studio album by Hank Williams III
- Released: September 30, 2013
- Genres: Country; outlaw country
- Length: 89:17
- Labels: Megaforce; Hank 3 Records
- Producer: Hank Williams III

Hank Williams III chronology
Long Gone Daddy (2012)	Brothers of the 4×4 (2013)	A Fiendish Threat (2013)

Professional ratings
Aggregate scores
Source	Rating
Metacritic	78/100
Review scores
Source	Rating
AllMusic	3.5/5 stars
Exclaim!	7/10
NME	4/5 stars

Brothers of the 4×4 is the ninth studio album by American country music artist Hank Williams III, released on September 30, 2013, along with A Fiendish Threat. Williams is credited as "Hank 3" on the cover. Clocking in at 89 minutes and 17 seconds, Brothers of the 4x4 is Williams' longest studio album to date, overtaking 2006's Straight to Hell, which is two minutes shorter.

== Commercial performance ==
In its first week of release, the album debuted at number 10 on the US Top Country Albums chart, and sold 6,000 copies.

== Track listing ==
Disc 1
No.	Title	Writer(s)	Length
1.	"Nearly Gone"		8:34
2.	"Hurtin' for Certin"		4:20
3.	"Brothers of the 4×4"		3:57
4.	"Farthest Away"		6:06
5.	"Held Up"		5:04
6.	"Outdoor Plan"	Eddie Pleasant	4:21
7.	"Deep Scars"		6:51
8.	"Lookey Yonder Commin'"		5:01
9.	"Ain't Broken Down"		6:27
10.	"Overdrive"		4:30
11.	"Loners 4 Life"		7:48
12.	"Dreadful Drive"		6:44

Disc 2
No.	Title	Length
1.	"Getting Dim"	2:37
2.	"Possum in a Tree"	2:55
3.	"Broken Boogie"	7:44
4.	"Toothpickin'"	5:56

== Chart performance ==
Chart (2013)	Peak position
U.S. Billboard 200	61
U.S. Billboard Top Country Albums	10
U.S. Billboard Top Independent Albums	12
