= The Damn Band =

American country, cowpunk and psychobilly band

- Genres: Country; cowpunk; psychobilly
- Instruments: Guitar; Bass; Steel Guitar; Fiddle; Drums; Banjo; Dobro; Harmonica
- Years active: 1995–present

The Damn Band is the backing band of Hank Williams III. It was formed in 1995, and the band is on most of Williams's country records. The band has had many changes in the line-ups. It consists of acoustic guitar (played by Williams), steel guitar, fiddle, bass, drums, electric guitar and banjo.

== History ==
Hank Williams III is the grandson of Hank Williams and son of Hank Williams Jr. Williams began his musical career in the early 1990s, playing with obscure punk bands until a judge ordered him in 1995 to "find a real job" and ruled that he owed thousands of dollars in back child support. Williams decided that he would pursue a career in Country music and signed with Curb Records. Around this time he formed The Damn Band, which consisted of traditional country instruments such as the Steel Guitar, Fiddle, and upright Bass. Although the players and instruments may give off the impression that they are solely a country band, they can easily switch into a metal-influenced "Hellbilly" set, and many of the members also play in Assjack.

The Damn Band has appeared with Williams on television and radio, including Fast N' Loud, The Late Late Show and The Grand Ole Opry.

Williams usually starts his live shows with a country set featuring The Damn Band. The band will then switch into a short set "Hellbilly" (often described as a cross between Punk, Metal and Country), after which bands will switch and Williams will play with Assjack, A.D.D., or 3 Bar Ranch.

Michael "Fiddleboy" McCanless was a member of The Damn Band from 1999 to 2002. He has been credited for helping Hank and the Damn Band venture into Hellbilly music as he was the first to suggest adding fiddle to some of Hank's early metal work. After he fell ill from cancer, Williams started the "Fuck Cancer Campaign" to help pay for McCanless' treatments.

The band has been very inactive since 2015. No new material by Williams and the band has been released since 2013 with the exception of old recordings released by Curb Records.

== Members ==
=== Present ===
- Hank Williams III - electric and acoustic guitar, vocals
- David McElfresh - fiddle (since November 2009)
- Daniel Mason - banjo
- Gary Lindsey - backing vocals

== Past ==
=== Bass ===
- Jason "Red" Brown
- Scott McEwen
- Jason Burns
- Jim Finklea
- Zach Shedd
- Jeremy Pittman
- Anthony Galler

=== Fiddle ===
- Vernon Derrick
- Donnie Herron
- Britton Currie
- Michael "Fiddleboy" McCanless
- Jason Ellsworth
- Ollie O'Shea
- Michael Starr
- Greg Garing
- Adam McOwen

=== Drums ===
- Shawn McWilliams
- Joe Fazzio
- Brad Pemberton
- Tim Yeung
- Munesh Sami
- Matt Bohli

=== Steel guitar ===
- Chad "C.J." Udeen
- Kayton Roberts
- Big Jim Murphy
- Dan Johnson
- Andy Gibson

=== Electric guitar ===
- Duane Denison
- Chris Masterson
- Rudy Parris (The Voice season 3)

=== Harmonica ===
- J.D. Wilkes (November 2002)
