= Portrait of Jaco: The Early Years, 1968–1978 =

Compilation album by Jaco Pastorius
- Released: November 1, 2003
- Recorded: 1968–1978
- Genre: Jazz
- Label: Holiday Park Records
- Producer: Bob Bobbing

Professional ratings
Review scores
Source	Rating
Allmusic	4.5/5 stars

Portrait of Jaco: The Early Years, 1968–1978 is a compilation of recordings made by Jaco Pastorius between 1968 and 1978. It was released in 2003 by Holiday Park Records.

== Track listing ==
=== Disc One: Jocko ===
1. "Sermon at the Crossroads"
2. "Please Don't Love Me" (featuring Jack Pastorius, Jaco's father)
3. "Jocko's First Gig" (Jaco on drums)
4. "The Chicken" (Jaco plays all instruments)
5. "Suzanne" (on first record '68)
6. "If You Were Mine" (Woodchuck)
7. "Street Life" (Interview)
8. "Mr. Pitiful" (Woodchuck)
9. "Higher Solo" (Tommy Strand)
10. "Ming of Mings" (Wayne Cochran & the C.C. Riders)
11. "Rice Pudding" (Wayne Cochran & the C.C. Riders)
12. "Amelia" (Wayne Cochran & the C.C. Riders)
13. "Like the Sound of the Music?" (Wayne Cochran & the C.C. Riders)
14. "Long, Long Day" (Wayne Cochran & the C.C. Riders)
15. "Exploring on Acoustic" (Jaco warming up on acoustic bass)
16. "Dexterity" (more on acoustic)
17. "Birth of Continuum"
18. "Mr. Clean" (Ira Sullivan)
19. "I Can Dig It Baby" (Little Beaver)
20. "Touch the Sky"

=== Disc Two: Jaco ===
1. "Behind the Scenes with Jaco"
2. "Between Races" (Peter Graves Orchestra)
3. "Domingo" (Peter Graves Orchestra)
4. "Wiggle Waggle" (Peter Graves Orchestra)
5. "Opus Pocus" (Jaco's demo recording)
6. "Balloon Song" (Jaco's demo recording)
7. "Continuum" (Jaco's demo recording)
8. "Behind the Scenes...Part 2"
9. "All The Things You Are" (Pat Metheny)
10. "Bright Size Life" (Pat Metheny)
11. "Epic Signs Jaco"
12. "The Real Deal" (Jaco explains)
13. "Refuge of the Roads" (Joni Mitchell)
14. "Hejira" (Jaco with Joni Mitchell)
15. "Jaco, John & Mary" (Jaco playing with his children)
16. "Cannonball" (Joe Zawinul & Weather Report)
17. "Kuru/Speak Like a Child" (Herbie Hancock)
18. "Las Olas Farewell" (Jaco sings)
