= 3 Bar Ranch Cattle Callin' =

Studio album by Hank Williams III
- Released: September 6, 2011
- Genres: Speed metal; cattlecore
- Length: 71:47
- Labels: Megaforce; Hank 3 Records
- Producer: Hank Williams III

Hank Williams III chronology
Ghost to a Ghost/Gutter Town (2011)	3 Bar Ranch Cattle Callin' (2011)	Attention Deficit Domination (2011)

Professional ratings
Aggregate scores
Source	Rating
Metacritic	46/100
Review scores
Source	Rating
AllMusic	3.5/5 stars
Revolver	1.5/5 stars
Slant Magazine	.5/5 stars

3 Bar Ranch Cattle Callin' is the seventh studio album by Hank Williams III, released on September 6, 2011 on Hank 3 Records, through Megaforce Records.

== Critical reception ==
3 Bar Ranch Cattle Callin' was met with "mixed or average" reviews from critics. At Metacritic, which assigns a weighted average rating out of 100 to reviews from mainstream publications, this release received an average score of 46 based on 6 reviews.

In a review for Slant Magazine, critic reviewer Jonathan Keefe wrote: "Cattle Callin is a concept record whose concept is so deeply flawed that it never should've made it as far as the studio. Cattle Callin provides Hank 3 with another opportunity to showcase his technical chops, even his arrangements and vicious guitar riffs grow repetitive after the first few tracks."

== Live ==
3 Bar Ranch was a part of Hank's live show replacing the Assjack set. Both live bands have had notable extreme drummers performing alongside Hank, like Tim Yeung (Nile), Joey Gonzalez (Phil Anselmo) and Phil Cancilla (Malevolent Creation). Hank's last live show was October 6, 2014 at the Ogden Theater in Denver, Colorado. Cancilla is the last drummer to perform live with Hank.

== Track listing ==
3 Bar Ranch Cattle Callin'
No.	Title	Writer(s)	Length
1.	"Black Cow" (featuring Tim Dowler)	Hank Williams III	5:09
2.	"Now There's a Bull" (featuring Joe Goggins)	Williams III	0:57
3.	"37 Heffers" (featuring Dan Clark)	Williams III	1:30
4.	"Mad Cow" (featuring Tim Dowler)	Williams III	10:01
5.	"Branded" (featuring Mitch Jordan)	Williams III	2:26
6.	"Square Bailor" (featuring Tim Dowler)	Williams III	3:19
7.	"Cuttin' Hay" (featuring Jason Miller)	Williams III	4:21
8.	"Y Bar Ranch" (featuring Mitch Jordan)	Williams III	0:50
9.	"Countin' Cows"	Williams III	2:28
10.	"Mad Cow"	Williams III	10:02
11.	"Lot 53" (featuring Dominic Herrera)	Williams III	1:44
12.	"Cow Sold" (featuring Hugh Howell)	Williams III	0:56
13.	"Cow Mortal" (featuring Hugh Howell and Eddie Cope)	Williams III	2:50
14.	"Bull Balls" (featuring Gwynn Howell)	Williams III	1:21
15.	"Heavy Cattle" (featuring Hugh Howell)	Williams III	3:37
16.	"Y Bar Ranch"	Williams III	0:49
17.	"Black Cow"	Williams III	5:04
18.	"Longhorn" (featuring Eddie Cope)	Williams III	2:10
19.	"Square Bailor"	Williams III	3:20
20.	"Moo You"	Williams III	1:23
21.	"Angus of Death" (featuring Tim Dowler)	Williams III	2:32
22.	"Cattle Callin' Lonesome Blues" (featuring Jason Miller)	Williams III	6:28
23.	"Branded"	Williams III	2:30
