= Attention Deficit Domination =

Studio album by Hank Williams III
- Released: September 6, 2011
- Genre: Doom metal; stoner metal
- Length: 50:16
- Label: Megaforce; Hank 3 Records
- Producer: Hank Williams III

Hank Williams III chronology
3 Bar Ranch Cattle Callin' (2011)	Attention Deficit Domination (2011)	Long Gone Daddy (2012)

Professional ratings
Review scores
Source	Rating
AllMusic	3/5 stars
Slant Magazine	2.5/5 stars

Attention Deficit Domination is the eighth studio album by American musician Hank Williams III, released on September 6, 2011 on Hank 3 Records, through Megaforce Records. It reached third position on the Billboard's Heatseekers album chart on its first week. The album is dedicated to Layne Staley of Alice in Chains.

== Track listing ==
All tracks are written by Hank Williams III

No.	Title	Length
1.	"In the Camouflage"	3:41
2.	"I Feel Sacrificed"	7:25
3.	"Bend"	3:14
4.	"Make a Fall"	5:26
5.	"Livin' Beyond Doom"	8:45
6.	"Demons Mark"	3:43
7.	"Aman"	5:43
8.	"Get Str8"	4:24
9.	"Goats "N" Heathans"	7:55
Total length:		50:16

== Personnel ==
- Hank Williams III – vocals, guitar, bass, keyboards, drums, production
