= The Best Years of Our Lives (disambiguation) =

The Best Years of Our Lives is a 1946 American drama film directed by William Wyler.

The Best Years of Our Lives may also refer to:

- The Best Years of Our Lives (Steve Harley & Cockney Rebel album), 1975
  - "The Best Years of Our Lives" (Steve Harley & Cockney Rebel song), the album's title track
- "Best Years of Our Lives" (song), a 1982 song by Modern Romance, later covered by Baha Men in 2001
- The Best Years of Our Lives (Neil Diamond album), 1988
- The Best Years of Our Lives (Richard Clapton album), 1989
- "Best Years of Our Lives", a 1993 song by Orchestral Manoeuvres in the Dark from the album Liberator
