= Early Years, Vol. 2 =

Compilation album by Hank Williams Jr
- Released: October 6, 1998
- Length: 38:16
- Label: Curb
- Producers: Ritchie Albright; Phil Gernhard; Clayton Ivey; Waylon Jennings; Hank Williams Jr.; Terry Woodford

Hank Williams Jr chronology
Early Years, Vol. 1 (1998)	Early Years, Vol. 2 (1998)	Stormy (1999)

Early Years, Vol. 2 is an album by American artist Hank Williams Jr. The album was released on October 6, 1998, via Curb Records.

== Track listing ==
1. "Feelin' Better" – 4:00
2. "She's Still the Star (On the Stage of My Mind)" – 2:31
3. "Honey, Won't You Call Me" – 2:50
4. "Building Memories" – 2:35
5. "New South" – 4:19
6. "Long Way to Hollywood" – 2:59
7. "Angels Get Lonesome Sometimes" – 2:58
8. "Montgomery in the Rain" – 3:55
9. "Looking at the Rain" – 3:39
10. "You Love the Thunder" – 3:30
