= She Won't Be Lonely Long =

Studio album by Clay Walker
- Released: June 8, 2010
- Genre: Country
- Length: 43:14
- Label: Curb
- Producer: Keith Stegall (tracks 1–9); Doug Johnson (tracks 10–12)

Clay Walker chronology
Fall (2007)	She Won't Be Lonely Long (2010)	Long Live the Cowboy (2019)

Singles from She Won't Be Lonely Long
- 1. "She Won't Be Lonely Long" Released: December 7, 2009; 2. "Where Do I Go from You" Released: August 2, 2010; 3. "Like We Never Said Goodbye" Released: January 16, 2012; 4. "Jesse James" Released: September 17, 2012

She Won't Be Lonely Long is the ninth studio album by American country music artist Clay Walker, and was released on June 8, 2010, via Curb Records. It is Walker's first studio album since 2007's Fall.

== Background ==
On February 2, 2010, Curb released an extended play that featured the title track as well as "Jesse James" and his three previous singles from his last album. Walker revealed to The Plain Dealer that the album was originally scheduled to be released in April, he said, "It was going to come in April and we asked the label to move it back to June because we wanted to wait until we felt like the song was going to be in that No. 1 slot."

In an interview with The Daily Times, Walker commented on the new release, calling it his best work to date, “You're not going to be able to get 10 or 11 songs on an album that are all going to be classics, That's pretty much impossible, so you have to take from the plants that are available. This record is full of great songs. Usually, when I look at an album and weigh it out and pick out what could be the career records, I could look at them and know there was a least one on there. Sometimes two. This time, there's four — double the amount. I'm not really a big statistics guy, but this could be the biggest record of my career.” Walker told Country Weekly, "This is our ninth studio album, so I think the bar is higher. You have to put out songs that are going to be better than previous songs that you've recorded because people already have some favorite Clay Walker songs. You've got to make songs that are going to fit in the stack of great ones."

In another interview, Walker stated "I definitely don’t feel like a rookie, but at the same time, I think the best years of my recording career are ahead of me. I believe if the good Lord wants it, who’s going to stop it?” In an interview with CMT Walker said, "Whenever you've had hits like we have, fans expect something extraordinary from you. They already have songs [from you] that they love and have memories with and that are very dear to them. They want to hear something as good as -- or better than -- the hits. That is a pretty difficult task and [it's] what took the time. We just couldn't go out there with something less than spectacular."

During a performance on Fox News, Walker said, "The goal on this record was to make every song have one or two lines in it that people could hang their hat on. Walker told The Boot, "She Won't Be Lonely Long' is the best album I think I've ever recorded, from start to finish. We've had some big hits, and I've enjoyed all of them, but as far as complete albums go, my first album is the only one where I've ever looked back and said from start to finish that's a completely, absolutely, no-regret album. Now I'm saying the same thing with this one. And that's the first time I've done that in a long time." Walker told Nashville Music Guide, "I’ve been doing this a good long while, and I’ve never once seen the caliber of songs that I have on this record. I was so blown away by the songs Curb played me. I walked into an A&R meeting, one of the last ones before I went in to record. They played me four songs, and I recorded all four songs. All four were smashes."

Walker told the Albuquerque Journal, that he can sense what songs will be hits on his albums and he said, "I think by now I should be able to recognize one, but you know I have always felt like I knew the country music audience well. I think that's my strength, recognizing songs that people really do like. Most of the time, it is the kind of song I personally gravitate to and genuinely like. Looking back, it's rare that I think a certain cut is a charter and it's not in reality." Walker also discussed recording "Feels so Right" by saying, "I've loved that song for most of my life. When I was 12, my mom and I went and saw Alabama play, and when they did that song, I saw how happy it made her and all the different emotions on her face. It moved me on a deep level and I never forgot that. I have always wanted to track that song and jumped at the opportunity to go in the studio with Randy Owen and record it. And now that I have, it's not only nostalgic when I was a child, but it is as relevant today, as an adult that can share that with his mother. ... I'll never forget the day I called her and told her I was going to cover it. She was so excited."

Walker told Desert Life Style about the process of selecting songs for the album by saying, "It takes awhile to find great songs. Sometimes they’ll fall in your lap but it’s a process that’s not easy. It can be grueling; you may look for a year to find eight or 10 songs that would actually make a complete album. In the 90s we recorded albums a lot quicker. You had about three months to get everything together and the process was a lot faster. There were some great songs that came out but there were fewer great “albums.” Now, I like the process more because every song needs to be chosen as if it were going to be a single. To me there is no such thing as filler material anymore, which was a term used in the 90s. There isn't filler anymore because of the digital age. It's really making people be more on their game because there is so much to choose from."

The Governor of Texas, Rick Perry, used Walker's song "All American” as his campaign song for the 2012 Presidential election. Walker told Fox and Friends, "He said he wanted to use the song, what do you think, and I said I'm flattered, I'm honored, and the song just talks about good hometown values and that is what Rick is about, he's a blue collar guy."

== Content ==
The title track is the first single from She Won't Be Lonely Long, and was sent to radio stations on December 6, 2009. Walker commented on the song, saying “I wanted the first single off my forthcoming album to reflect the work I’ve been doing to become the artist I want to be. ‘She Won’t Be Lonely Long’ is an example of these steps and this work. Lyrically, it is a song that resonates with both women and men because we all want to look our best once we are unexpectedly ‘back on the market.’”

The album also features a duet with Randy Owen, lead singer of Alabama, on a rendition of Alabama's "Feels So Right."

== Track listing ==
No.	Title	Writer(s)	Length
1.	"She Won't Be Lonely Long"	Galen Griffin, Doug Johnson, Phil O'Donnell	3:27
2.	"Like We Never Said Goodbye"	Cory Batten, Tiffany Goss	3:01
3.	"Where Do I Go from You"	Don Cook, Clint Daniels, Ryan Tyndell	3:26
4.	"Keep Me From Loving You"	Lisa Hentrich, Wendell Mobley, Neil Thrasher	3:06
5.	"Jesse James"	Ben Glover, Kyle Jacobs, Joe Leathers	4:19
6.	"Double Shot of John Wayne"	M. Jason Greene, Clay Walker	2:37
7.	"Seven Sundays"	Nathan Christopher, Greg Johnson, Kelly Roland	4:20
8.	"All American"	Greene, Walker	4:26
9.	"Summertime Song"	Greene, Walker	3:02
10.	"Wrong Enough to Know"	G. Johnson, Walker, Kim Williams	3:17
11.	"People in Planes"	Barry Dean, Luke Laird	3:51
12.	"Feels So Right" (ft. Randy Owen)	Randy Owen	3:35

iTunes bonus track
No.	Title	Length
13.	"Pray for God"	3:28

== Critical reception ==
Professional ratings
Review scores
Source	Rating
AllMusic	3/5 stars
Associated Press	(favorable)
Citadel Digital	(favorable)
Country Music Capital News	(favorable)
Country Weekly	3/5 stars
Oklahoman	(mixed)
Roughstock	4/5 stars
Engine 145	3/5 stars
Times Record News	(A)
Winnipeg Free Press	(favorable)

Country Weekly reviewer Jessica Phillips rated the album three stars out of five, calling it "another solid release" from the singer. Her review praises the ballads, as well as "Jesse James" and the "Feels So Right" cover, but refers to "All American" and "Summertime Song" as "clunkers." Also giving it three stars out of five, Allmusic reviewer Thom Jurek praised the album for its "straight-up, mainstream contemporary country" sound but said that it did not reflect a change in sound from Fall.

The Associated Press wrote "Walker keeps coming back, thanks to savvy song selection and a friendly, romantic style that fits well with country radio. His latest album shows why Walker continues to deserve his place in modern country music. Bobby Peacock of Roughstock gave the album four stars writing, "At the very least, the album proves that Walker's already impressive career is far from over, and may even be at the opening of a new chapter."

Don Chance of Times Record News gave the album an A rating and wrote "Kicking comfortably mid-tempo with the title track, Walker somehow manages to make brand new music seem as familiar as his string of hits, and I wasn't sure that was even possible. I'm pretty sure this one will be among my Top 10 albums for the year. Chance also listed the album as the sixth best of 2010 and said, "he really impressed me with his dedication to solid country music." Bruce Leperre of the Winnipeg Free Press gave the album a positive review by writing "The white hat wearin', big ol' buckle sportin' Texan's 11th album may not offer any surprises but it's his strongest offering in quite some time." Karlie Justus of Engine 145 gave the album three stars and wrote, "She Won't Be Lonely Long won't disappoint longtime fans looking for a fix and boasts plenty of worthwhile, radio-ready singles that sound at once deliciously vintage and effortlessly modern. Unfortunately, Walker also seems intent on upping his 2010 street cred with stereotypical, dime-a-dozen album filler in line with some of today’s most popular country stars."

Ben Walker of The Oklahoman gave the album a mixed review and wrote, "Walker has an easy and pleasurable voice, and his singing sounds so effortless that he can make a mediocre tune into a good one." He also stated, "She Won't Be Lonely Long" has enough good songs like "People in Planes" (destined to be a No. 1 hit) and a few others to make the album worthwhile. But this won't get Walker back to selling out arenas and hanging platinum records on the wall." Nikita Palmer of Citadel Digital gave the album a positive review and praised the title track as well as the selection of material. Palmer also wrote, "It’s on the mid-tempos where Clay really shines, particularly on “Where Do I Go From You” and “Keep Me From Loving You.” Country Music Capital News in Australia gave the album a positive review and said, "She Won't Be Lonely Long won't disappoint long time fans looking for a fix, and boasts plenty of songs that sound at once deliciously vintage and effortlessly modern."

== Chart performance ==
She Won't Be Lonely Long debuted at #5 on the U.S. Billboard Top Country Albums chart and at #16 on the U.S. Billboard 200, with first week sales of 19,782. As of July 31, 2010, the album has sold 49,476 copies in the U.S.

=== Weekly charts ===
Chart (2010)	Peak position
U.S. Billboard 200	16
U.S. Billboard Top Country Albums	5

=== Year-end charts ===
Chart (2010)	Year-end 2010
US Billboard Top Country Albums	67

=== Singles ===
Year	Single	Peak chart positions		
Year	Single	US Country	US Country Airplay	US
2009	"She Won't Be Lonely Long"	4	—	53
2010	"Where Do I Go from You"	26	—	—
2011	"Like We Never Said Goodbye"	46	—	—
2012	"Jesse James"	57	48	—
"—" denotes releases that did not chart

== Personnel ==
=== Musicians ===
- Eddie Bayers - drums
- Lisa Cochran - background vocals
- Paul Franklin - steel guitar, dobro
- Andy Leftwich - fiddle, mandolin
- Brent Mason - electric guitar
- Gordon Mote - piano, Hammond B-3 organ
- Randy Owen - duet vocals on "Feels So Right"
- John Wesley Ryles - background vocals
- Jimmie Lee Sloas - bass guitar
- Clay Walker - lead vocals
- Bruce Watkins - acoustic guitar

=== Technical ===
- Jason Campbell - production coordination
- Doug Johnson – producer (tracks 11 and 12)
- John Kelton - engineer, mixing
- Tanja Lippert - photography, creative director, stylist
- Tia Reagan - photography, creative director, stylist
- Matt Rovey - engineer
- Keith Stegall - producer (tracks 1–10)
- Hank Williams - mastering
