= Early Years, Vol. 1 =

Compilation album by Hank Williams, Jr
- Released: October 6, 1998
- Genre: Country
- Length: 32:02
- Label: Curb
- Producers: Ritchie Albright; Clayton Ivey; Waylon Jennings; Hank Williams, Jr.; Terry Woodford

Hank Williams, Jr chronology
Three Hanks: Men With Broken Hearts (1996)	Early Years, Vol. 1 (1998)	Early Years, Vol. 2 (1998)

Early Years, Vol. 1 is an album by American artist Hank Williams, Jr. It was released on October 6, 1998, via Curb Records.a

== Track listing ==
1. "I'm Not Responsible" – 3:24
2. "How's My Ex Treating You" – 3:02
3. "You're Gonna Change (Or I'm Gonna Leave)" – 3:57
4. "All by Myself" – 3:06
5. "One Night Stands" – 4:12
6. "Tennessee" – 2:22
7. "Once and for All" – 3:17
8. "Mobile Boogie" – 2:35
9. "Storms Never Last" – 3:28
10. "It's Different with You" – 3:06
