= Risin' Outlaw =

Studio album by Hank Williams III
- Released: September 7, 1999
- Genre: Country
- Length: 43:54
- Label: Curb
- Producer: Chuck Howard; Bob Campbell-Smith

Hank Williams III chronology
Three Hanks: Men with Broken Hearts (1996)	Risin' Outlaw (1999)	Live in Scotland (2001)

Professional ratings
Review scores
Source	Rating
Allmusic	4/5 stars
Christgau's Consumer Guide	B+

Risin' Outlaw is the debut studio album by American country music singer Hank Williams III. It was released on September 7, 1999, by Curb Records. The album was produced by Chuck Howard and Bob Campbell-Smith.

Williams has stated that he despises this album in particular and considers his next album Lovesick, Broke and Driftin' as his real debut. In an interview Williams gave with Country Standard Time, he said, "I'm not happy with it. I hate it; can't even listen to but maybe two songs on it. I said (to the label) that every damn interview that I do I ain't gonna talk good about it. Curb thinks this album is so different and so alternative. It's a headache."

== Track listing ==
No.	Title	Writer(s)	Length
1.	"I Don't Know"	Randy Howard	3:23
2.	"You're the Reason"	Bobby Edwards, Terry Fell, James F. Hanley, Mildred Imes	2:49
3.	"If the Shoe Fits"	Warren Denny, Hank Williams III	2:54
4.	"87 Southbound"	Wayne Hancock	2:52
5.	"Lonesome for You"	Buddy Miller, Julie Miller	3:17
6.	"What Did Love Ever Do to You"	Kostas, Dean Miller	3:01
7.	"On My Own"	Williams	2:55
8.	"Honky Tonk Girls"	Kostas	2:42
9.	"Devil's Daughter"	Eddie Pleasant, Kostas, Williams	3:17
10.	"Cocaine Blues"	T.J. Arnall	3:53
11.	"Thunderstorms and Neon Signs"	Wayne Hancock	4:21
12.	"Why Don't You Leave Me Alone"	Hancock	5:03
13.	"Blue Devil"	Williams	3:19
Total length:			43:54

== Personnel ==
- Hank Williams III - vocals, guitar
- Greg Morrow - drums
- Dale Crover - drums
- Jason Brown - upright bass
- Brent Rowan - guitars
- J. T. Corenflos - guitars
- Michael Spriggs - guitars
- Rob Hajacos - fiddle
- Dan Dugmore - steel guitar
- Kayton Roberts - steel guitar
- Paul Franklin - steel guitar
- Vernon Derrick - fiddle, mandolin
- Curtis Young - backing vocals
- Neil Thrasher - backing vocals

== Chart performance ==
Chart (2000)	Peak position
U.S. Billboard Top Country Albums	52
