= Joe Buck (musician) =

American musician

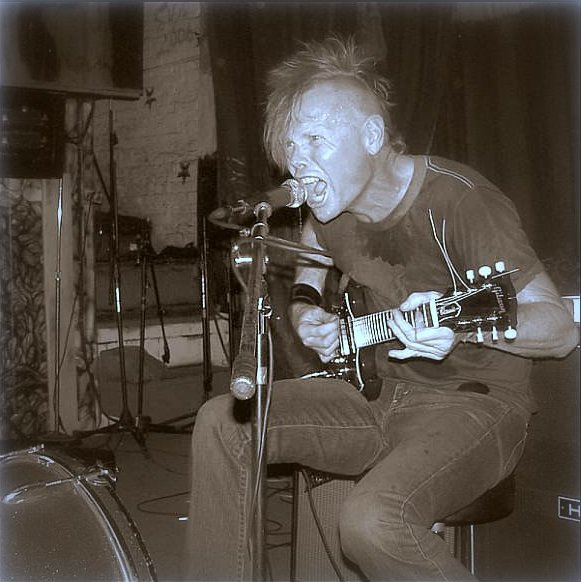
Joe Buck in performance

James Finklea, known professionally as Joe Buck or Joe Buck Yourself, is an American country and punk rock musician, singer, and songwriter from Murray, Kentucky. His primary instruments are double bass and guitar.

He was born on August 8, 1969, in Murray, Kentucky. He started playing music at the age of 13 in 1982. Joe Buck's first serious musical project was called Gringo. They released self-titled "Gringo" on Pravda Records in 1995. The lineup consisted of Buck on vocals and guitar, Leila Vartanian on vocals and bass, and Tim Krause, who produced the CD, playing drums. It is a polarized collection of ballads and throbbing rockers. The follow-up CD, "Combine" was released on Pravda Records in 1997. It is a blend of country and newgrass and is musically distinct from the first CD. The lineup consists of Jim and Leila as before but the drums are replaced by Martin O'Doherty on banjo.

In the late 1990s, Joe Buck emerged as the guitarist for Th' Legendary Shack Shakers. He played all guitar, bass and drums on their 2003 album Cockadoodledon't.

He played bass for Hank Williams III's country/hellbilly "Damn Band", and was also member of Williams' punk-metal project Assjack. He is credited, along with Williams and Andy Gibson, with engineering and producing Williams' album, Straight to Hell, and appears to have recorded backing vocals for Hank Williams III's Bootleg #3 Pre-Release album.

As a solo artist, he tours internationally under the moniker "Joe Buck Yourself" and is represented by Bucket City Agency, a booking agency which he co-founded.

He and a former girlfriend, Leila, once owned Jim and Layla's Bar, a honky tonk in downtown Nashville, Tennessee. After splitting up, Leila obtained ownership of the establishment which is now known as "Layla's Bluegrass Inn".

He is now divorced and has one son named Milo who was born in 2013.

== Discography ==
- Gringo album by Gringo (1995)
- Combine album by Gringo (1997)
- Bootleg #3 Pre-Release Hank Williams III (2002)
- Cockadoodledon't with Th' Legendary Shack Shakers (2003)
- Joe Buck Yourself Motherfucker album and EP (2004)
- One Man Banned EP (2006)
- One Man Banned DVD (2006)
- Straight to Hell Hank Williams III (2006)
- Joe Buck Yourself Album (2007)
- Gory Gory Hallelujah EP (2008)
- "Buck & Wheeler" EP (2008)
- Damn Right, Rebel Proud Hank Williams III (2008)
- "Piss and Vinegar" album by [Joe Buck Yourself] (2010)
- "Who Dat?" album by [Joe Buck Yourself] (2012)
