= Dave Evans (bluegrass) =

- Born: William Evans; July 24, 1950; Portsmouth, Ohio
- Died: June 25, 2017 (aged 66) Morehead, Kentucky
- Genres: Bluegrass music
- Occupation: Musician
- Instrument: Banjo
- Years active: 1968–2010
- Labels: Vetco, Rebel

William "Dave" Evans (July 24, 1950 - June 26, 2017) was a tenor singer, banjo player, composer, and bluegrass band leader. He was noted for his powerful tenor vocal range and for his style which bridged traditional and contemporary bluegrass. Notable songs written by Evans include "One Loaf of Bread," "Highway 52," "99 Years is Almost for Life," and "Be Proud of the Grey in Your Hair."

== Biography ==
=== Early years ===
Evans grew up in Columbus, Ohio. At age eight, Evans was introduced to the banjo by his father who played old time banjo, but Evans preferred the Earl Scruggs style of playing. In his teens, he began singing and writing songs. Evans' first professional band was in 1968, with Earl Taylor and the Stoney Mountain Boys. Following the death of Evans' mother, he returned to Ohio for several years.

=== Larry Sparks ===
In 1972, Evans joined Larry Sparks and the Lonesome Ramblers. He spent three years with Sparks, then worked with other acts such as the Goins Brothers, Red Allen and the Kentuckians, and The Boys From Indiana, Lillie Mae, and the Dixie Gospelaires.

=== River Bend ===
In 1978, Evans formed his own band: Dave Evans and The River Bend. Initially they recorded for the Vetco label in Cincinnati, then Evans recorded nine albums for Rebel Records with his band and as a solo artist.

=== Later life ===
After an interruption due to time served for an assault conviction from 1989-1995, Evans resumed his music career in 1997, recording albums for Neon Records and Rebel. In 2010, Evans announced his retirement from touring due to health issues and he died on June 26, 2017.

=== Last of the Breed ===
Last of the Breed is a documentary film about the life and music of Evans, telling his story through interviews with those who knew him. It is produced by Matthew Pellowski, with Tom T. Hall as an associate producer. The project is in the fundraising phase.

== Discography ==
=== Solo albums ===
- 1982: A Few More Seasons (Rebel)
- 1997: Just Look At Me Now (Neon) reissued in 2003 by Rebel
- 1998: High Waters (Neon) reissued in 2003 by Rebel
- 2000: Bad Moon Shining (Rebel)
- 2001: Hang Out A Light For Me (Rebel)
- 2007: Pretty Green Hills (Rebel)

=== As a member of Dave Evans and River Bend ===
- 1979: Dave Evans And River Bend: Highway Fifty Two (Vetco) with River Bend
- 1980: Call Me Long Gone (Vetco) with River Bend
- 1981: Goin' Round This World (Rebel) with River Bend
- 1983: Poor Rambler (Rebel) with River Bend
- 1984: Bluegrass Memories (Rebel) with River Bend
- 1985: Close To Home (Rebel) with River Bend

=== Collaborations ===
- 1980: Playing it Simple (Vetco) Josh Graves with Dave Evans, Buddy Griffin, and David Pinson
- 1984: Don't Let Me Cross Over (Rutabaga) as Emma Smith and Dave Evans

=== Compilations ===
- 2008: The Best of the Vetco Years (Rebel)

=== With Larry Sparks and the Lonesome Ramblers ===
- 1974: The Footsteps of Tradition (King)
- 1974: Portrait of a Fiddler (Old Homestead) with Joe Meadows
- 1975: Pickin' & Singin' (Pine Tree)
- 1982: Dark Hollow (Rebel)
- 1983: The Testing Times (Rebel)

=== As composer ===
- 1978: Raintree - Wind in the Mountains (Green Mountain) - track 9, "Highway 52"
- 1985. Delia Bell and Bill Grant - A Few Dollars More (Rounder) - track 1, "Foggy Mountain Home"

=== Also appears on ===
- 1983: Ralph Stanley and Friends - Live at the Old Home Place (Rebel)
- 2007: Jim Lauderdale - The Bluegrass Diaries (Yep Roc)
- 2011: various artists - Let the Light Shine Down: A Gospel Tribute to Bill Monroe (Rebel) - track 13, "Mansions For Me"

=== Documentaries ===
- TBD: Last of the Breed: The Dave Evans Story (Red Line Studios)
