= Assjack (album) =

Studio album by Assjack
- Released: August 4, 2009
- Genre: Death metal; industrial metal; hardcore punk
- Length: 31:16
- Label: Curb Records
- Producer: Hank Williams III

Professional ratings
Review scores
Source	Rating
AllMusic	3/5 stars

Assjack is the self-titled only album by American metal band Assjack. It was released on August 4, 2009. Lead singer Hank Williams III performed, wrote, and produced the album on his own from his home studio in Berry Hill, Tennessee.

== Track listing ==
All music written and performed by Hank Williams III.

No.	Title	Length
1.	"Tennessee Driver"	2:48
2.	"Wasting Away"	2:17
3.	"Choking Gesture"	3:39
4.	"Gravel Pit"	4:09
5.	"Cut Throat"	1:49
6.	"Smoke the Fire"	2:50
7.	"Cocaine the White Devil"	4:50
8.	"Redneck Ride"	2:12
9.	"No Regrets"	2:57
10.	"Doin' What I Want"	3:55
Total length:		31:16

== Personnel ==
- Hank Williams III - vocals, guitars, bass, drums, synth

=== Production ===
- Produced by Hank Williams III
- Engineered by Jim Lightman and Hank Williams III
- Mixed by Jim Lightman and Hank Williams III
- Mastered by Hank Williams III
