= Three Hanks: Men with Broken Hearts =

Studio album by Hank Williams, Hank Williams Jr. and Hank Williams III
- Released: September 17, 1996
- Recorded: Various dates
- Genre: Country
- Length: 31:36
- Label: Curb
- Producer: Chuck Howard

Hank Williams Jr. chronology
A.K.A. Wham Bam Sam (1996)	Three Hanks: Men with Broken Hearts (1996)	Early Years, Vol. 1 (1998)

Hank Williams III chronology
Three Hanks: Men with Broken Hearts (1996)	Risin' Outlaw (1999)

Professional ratings
Review scores
Source	Rating
Allmusic	link

Three Hanks: Men with Broken Hearts is a collaborative studio album released by Curb Records in 1996. It combines the songs of Hank Williams, who died in 1953, with newly recorded accompanying vocals from his son Hank Williams Jr. and grandson Hank Williams III, the latter of whom makes his recording debut. Aside from Hank Williams' songs, this album also features a new song written by Hank Williams Jr. titled "Hand Me Down".

== Track listing ==
No.	Title	Writer(s)	Length
1.	"I'll Never Get Out of This World Alive"	Hank Williams, Fred Rose	2:30
2.	"Move It On Over"	Williams	2:16
3.	"Moanin' the Blues"	Williams	2:33
4.	"Never Again (Will I Knock on Your Door)"	Williams	2:29
5.	"I'm a Long Gone Daddy"	Williams	2:55
6.	"Honky Tonk Blues"	Williams	2:19
7.	"I Won't Be Home No More"	Williams	2:29
8.	"'Neath a Cold Gray Tomb of Stone"	Williams, Mel Foree	2:54
9.	"Where the Soul of Man Never Dies"	Wayne Raney	1:44
10.	"Hand Me Down"	Hank Williams Jr.	4:03
11.	"Men with Broken Hearts"	Williams	3:12
12.	"Lost Highway"	Leon Payne	2:08
Total length:			31:36

== Personnel ==
- Eddie Bayers - drums, background vocals
- J.T. Corenflos - electric guitar
- Larry Franklin - fiddle
- Paul Franklin - steel guitar
- Dann Huff - electric guitar
- David Hungate - bass guitar, tic tac bass, background vocals
- Brent Mason - electric guitar
- Terry McMillan - harmonica
- Steve Nathan - keyboards
- Brent Rowan - electric guitar
- Michael Spriggs - acoustic guitar
- Audrey Williams - background vocals
- Hank Williams - lead vocals
- Hank Williams III - lead vocals
- Hank Williams Jr. - acoustic guitar, lead vocals, background vocals
- John Willis - electric guitar
- Glenn Worf - bass guitar

== Chart performance ==
Chart (1996)	Peak position
U.S. Billboard Top Country Albums	29
U.S. Billboard 200	167
