= Rebel Within =

Studio album by Hank Williams III
- Released: May 25, 2010
- Genre: Country
- Length: 46:31
- Label: Sidewalk
- Producer: Hank Williams III

Hank Williams III chronology
Damn Right, Rebel Proud (2008)	Rebel Within (2010)	Hillbilly Joker (2011)

Professional ratings
Review scores
Source	Rating
Slant Magazine	4/5 stars

Rebel Within is the fifth solo album by American country music artist Hank Williams III. It was released on May 25, 2010. The album was Williams' last authorized album from Curb Records. The track listing was announced on Hank's website on February 25.

== Track listing ==
All songs written by Hank Williams III except where noted.

No.	Title	Length
1.	"Gettin' Drunk and Fallin' Down"	2:34
2.	"Rebel Within"	4:44
3.	"Lookin' for a Mountain"	4:52
4.	"Gone But Not Forgotten"	4:57
5.	"Drinkin' Ain't Hard to Do"	3:33
6.	"Moonshiner's Life"	3:27
7.	"#5"	6:34
8.	"Karmageddon" (Written by Warren Denney and Tomi Lunsford)	4:27
9.	"Lost in Oklahoma"	4:02
10.	"Tore Up and Loud"	3:49
11.	"Drinkin' Over Mama"	3:11
Total length:		46:31

== Chart performance ==
Chart (2010)	Peak position
U.S. Billboard Top Country Albums	4
U.S. Billboard 200	20
