= Ghost to a Ghost/Gutter Town =

Studio album by Hank Williams III
- Released: September 6, 2011
- Genre: Country; ambient; cajun; folk
- Length: 59:41 (Ghost to a Ghost); 77:18 (Gutter Town); 136:59 (Total)
- Label: Megaforce; Hank 3 Records
- Producer: Hank Williams III; Andy Gibson

Hank Williams III chronology
Hillbilly Joker (2011)	Ghost to a Ghost/Gutter Town (2011)	3 Bar Ranch Cattle Callin' (2011)

Professional ratings
Review scores
Source	Rating
Slant Magazine	4.5/5 stars
Allmusic	4/5 stars

Ghost to a Ghost/Gutter Town is the sixth studio album by American musician Hank Williams III. The double album was released on September 6, 2011. All songs were recorded in Hank III's home studio The Haunted Ranch. The album features guest appearances by Tom Waits, Ray Lawrence Jr., Eddie Pleasant (Hank III's merchandise and scheduling guy), Alan King (Hellstomper), Les Claypool (Primus), Dave Sherman (Wretched, Earthride), Troy Medlin (Sourvein), and Williams' dog Trooper. Ghost to a Ghost/Gutter Town consisted of two of the four albums Hank Williams III simultaneously released on September 6, 2011, on Hank 3 Records (hank3.com), with distribution through Megaforce Records. It is also Hank III's first album to be released by Megaforce, after leaving Curb Records in 2010.

== Track listing ==
Ghost to a Ghost
No.	Title	Writer(s)	Length
1.	"Gutter Town"	Hank Williams III	4:39
2.	"Day by Day"	Williams III	5:12
3.	"Riding the Wave"	Williams III	5:56
4.	"Don't Ya Wanna"	Williams III	4:15
5.	"Ray Lawrence Jr." (feat. Ray Lawrence Jr.)	Ray Lawrence Jr.	7:02
6.	"The Devil's Movin' In"	Williams III	5:06
7.	"Time to Die"	Williams III	4:50
8.	"Troopers Hollar" (feat. Trooper)	Williams III	4:37
9.	"Outlaw Convention"	Williams III	5:15
10.	"Cunt of a Bitch" (feat. Alan King)	Williams III / Alan King	5:34
11.	"Ghost to a Ghost" (feat. Les Claypool, Alan King, Tom Waits, Dave Sherman and Troy Medlin)	Williams III	7:08
Total length:			59:41

Gutter Town
No.	Title	Writer(s)	Length
1.	"Goin' to Gutter Town"	Williams III	4:23
2.	"Gutter Stomp"	Williams III	3:19
3.	"The Dirt Road"	Williams III	4:14
4.	"Musha's"	Williams III	3:03
5.	"The Dream of Before"	Williams III	2:45
6.	"Dyin' Day"	Williams III	5:37
7.	"I Promised" (feat. Eddie Pleasant)	Eddie Pleasant	1:55
8.	"Chord of the Organ"	Williams III	1:07
9.	"Move Them Songs" (feat. Eddie Pleasant)	Pleasant	2:06
10.	"The Low Line"	Williams III	5:21
11.	"I'll Be Gone"	Williams III	6:32
12.	"Troopers Chaos" (feat. Trooper)	Williams III	5:24
13.	"Chaos Queen"	Williams III	5:36
14.	"Thunderpain"	Williams III	5:32
15.	"Fadin' Moon" (feat. Tom Waits)	Williams III	4:38
16.	"The Round"	Williams III	1:35
17.	"I'll Save My Tears"	Williams III	3:30
18.	"It's Goin' Down"	Williams III	3:40
19.	"With the Ship" (feat. Les Claypool)	Williams III	6:52
Total length:			77:18

== Personnel ==
- Hank Williams III – drums, acoustic guitar, vocals, keys, banjo
- Andy Gibson – steel guitar, banjo
- David McElfresh – fiddle, mandolin
- Zach Shedd – double bass
- Daniel Mason – banjo
- Johnny Hiland – guitar
- Billy Contreras – fiddle
- Rory Hoffman – accordion

== Chart performance ==
Chart (2011)	Peak position
U.S. Billboard 200	49
U.S. Billboard Top Country Albums	14
U.S. Billboard Top Independent Albums	7
