= Best of the Early Years =

Best of the Early Years may refer to:

- The Best of the Early Years (B.B. King album), 2007
- The Best of the Early Years: 1990–1995, a compilation album by Buju Banton
- Beginnings: The Best of the Early Years, a greatest hits compilation album by Clannad
- Shine: The Best of the Early Years, a compilation album by David Gray
- Best of the Early Years (Glen Campbell album)
- Best of the Early Years (Jimmy Buffett album)
- Best of the Early Years (They Might Be Giants album), 1999
