= Lovesick, Broke and Driftin' =

Studio album by Hank Williams III
- Released: January 29, 2002
- Genre: Country
- Length: 46:39
- Label: Curb
- Producer: Hank Williams III; Joe Funderburk

Hank Williams III chronology
Live in Scotland (2001)	Lovesick, Broke and Driftin' (2002)	Straight to Hell (2006)

Professional ratings
Review scores
Source	Rating
Allmusic	4/5 stars

Lovesick, Broke and Driftin' is the second studio album by American country music artist Hank Williams III, released on January 29, 2002. Hank III has stated that he considers this album as his real solo debut and despises his previous album Risin' Outlaw in particular.

== Track listing ==
All songs written by Hank Williams III unless otherwise noted.

No.	Title	Length
1.	"7 Months, 39 Days"	3:26
2.	"Broke, Lovesick, & Driftin'"	2:24
3.	"Cecil Brown"	3:32
4.	"Lovin' & Huggin'"	1:52
5.	"One Horse Town"	2:50
6.	"Mississippi Mud"	3:22
7.	"Whiskey, Weed, & Women"	4:08
8.	"Trashville"	3:14
9.	"Walkin' with Sorrow"	2:56
10.	"5 Shots of Whiskey"	4:20
11.	"Nightime Ramblin' Man"	2:47
12.	"Callin' Your Name"	3:13
13.	"Atlantic City^{1}" (Bruce Springsteen cover)	4:40
Total length:		46:39

== Personnel ==
- Hank Williams III – vocals, guitar
- Jason Brown – stand-up bass
- Chris Carmichael – fiddle
- Billy Gibbons – electric guitar
- Randy Kohrs – dobro, vocal harmony
- Michael McCanless – fiddle (only appears on Atlantic City)
- Shawn McWilliams – drums
- Kayton Roberts – steel guitar

== Charts ==
Chart (2002)	Peak position
U.S. Billboard 200	156
U.S. Billboard Top Country Albums	17
U.S. Billboard Top Heatseekers	4
