= Straight to Hell (album) =

Studio album by Hank Williams III
- Released: February 28, 2006
- Recorded: December 2004 – January 2005
- Genre: Country; bluegrass; Western swing; sound collage; psychedelic
- Length: 87:56
- Label: Bruc
- Producer: Joe Buck; Andy Gibson; Hank Williams III

Hank Williams III chronology
Lovesick, Broke and Driftin'' (2002)	Straight to Hell (2006)	Damn Right, Rebel Proud (2008)

Straight to Hell is the third studio album by American musician Hank Williams III, released on February 28, 2006, by Bruc Records, an imprint of Curb Records.

In largely self-produced sessions recorded at a band member's home, Williams and the Damn Band recorded traditional country music, western swing and bluegrass songs which focus on drug use, hedonism and the outlaw life, as well as criticism of the mainstream country music industry. These songs make up the first disc, while the second disc consists of a sound collage of psychedelic music.

== Recording ==
After the recording of Williams' previous album, Lovesick, Broke and Driftin' (2002), Williams would not release new music for another four years due to a contractual dispute with Curb Records. Upon resolving the dispute, Williams decided to produce and record his next album independently.

== Music ==
The album consists of two discs. The first disc consists of country, western swing and bluegrass songs which fused the "tempo and structure of bluegrass" with the "attitude and swagger of heavy metal". The album's lyrical themes include drug use, hedonism and the outlaw life, as well as criticism of the mainstream country music industry.

The album opens up with a sample of the Louvin Brothers' "Satan Is Real", which leads into the title track. Williams states that lyrical inspiration came from his very conservative religious mother, as well as an interest in Satan and Satanism.

"Dick In Dixie" was written as a criticism of country pop, which Williams views as being antithetical to traditional country music. Williams' criticisms of the mainstream country music industry are contrasted with a lyrical reverence for traditional country music artists displayed in songs such as "Country Heroes" in which he references country music artists that inspired him, including Hank Williams Sr., Johnny Cash, Waylon Jennings, George Jones and David Allan Coe. In the lyrics of "Not Everybody Likes Us", Williams addresses the rumor that Kid Rock is the son of Hank Williams Jr.

The second disc consists of a sound collage of psychedelic music It includes two tracks, "Louisiana Stripes", and a hidden track consisting of a medley of other Williams compositions along with covers of Hank Williams Sr.'s "I Could Never Be Ashamed Of You", Cheech & Chong's "Up in Smoke" and Wayne Hancock's "Take My Pain", all linked with various soundbites and sound effects such as voice mail messages, passing trains, runaway horses, a creek, a funeral, pig snorts, backmasking, and bong hits.

== Release ==
Straight to Hell was released as a double album on February 28, 2006 by Bruc Records, an imprint of Curb Records, on compact disc in explicit and clean edited editions, as well as on vinyl.

On his website, Williams encourages fans to support independent record outlets that are more willing to stock the uncensored version of the album.

== Reception ==
Professional ratings
Review scores
Source	Rating
Allmusic	4/5 stars
The A.V. Club	B+

Mark Deming of Allmusic gave the album 4 out of 5, writing, "There's a pure and soulful musical vision at the heart of Straight to Hell no matter how much Hank III lashes out against the confines of current country music and messes with the form, and that's what makes him most valuable as an outlaw -- there's lots of long-haired dope-smoking rednecks out there, but not many that can tap into the sweet and dirty heart of American music the way Hank III does, and Straight to Hell proves he's got a whole lot to say on that particular subject."

In a more critical review, The A.V. Club's Noel Murray gave the album a B+ rating, writing, "Just because Hank Williams III is the scion of country-music legends doesn't automatically excuse him from accusations of rednexploitation", claiming that the lyrics of "Crazed Country Rebel" "[pander] to people who think that 'authentic' country music has to be about outlaw losers, as though nobody in the heartland ever held onto a job or fell in love."

== Track listing ==
All tracks written by Hank Williams III, except where noted.

Disc one
No.	Title	Writer(s)	Length
1.	"Satan Is Real/Straight to Hell"	Charlie Louvin / Ira Louvin / Hank Williams III	3:08
2.	"Thrown Out of the Bar"		2:07
3.	"Things You Do to Me"		2:22
4.	"Country Heroes"		3:29
5.	"D. Ray White"		3:47
6.	"Low Down"		3:24
7.	"Pills I Took"	Wyatt G. Hellickson	2:31
8.	"Smoke & Wine"		2:36
9.	"My Drinkin' Problem"	Randy Howard	2:42
10.	"Crazed Country Rebel" (Not featured on clean version)		3:09
11.	"Dick in Dixie" (Not featured on clean version)		2:37
12.	"Not Everybody Likes Us"		4:30
13.	"Angel of Sin"		6:07
Total length:			40:29

Disc two
No.	Title	Writer(s)	Length
1.	"Louisiana Stripes" (Not featured on vinyl release)		3:28
2.	"Hidden Track"	Hank Williams / Williams III / Wayne Hancock / Cheech Marin / Tommy Chong	42:00
Total length:			45:28

Songs featured on Hidden Track
No.	Title	Writer(s)	Length
1.	"I Could Never Be Ashamed of You"	Williams
2.	"Smoke & Wine (Slowed Down Version)"
3.	"Alone & Dying"
4.	"On My Own"
5.	"Back by My Side"
6.	"Take My Pain"	Hancock
7.	"What's His Name"
8.	"Loaded 44"
9.	"Up in Smoke"	Marin / Chong

== Personnel ==
- Hank Williams III – vocals, acoustic guitar, electric guitar, electric tic-tac bass, tremolo guitar, phaser guitar, shouts, bong
- Joe Buck – electric bass, stand-up bass, mandolin, accordion, guitar, electric tic-tac bass, shouts
- Andy Gibson – steel guitar, Dobro
- Donnie Herron – fiddle, claw-hammer banjo
- Johnny Hiland – electric guitar
- Shawn McWilliams – drums
- Randy Kohrs – Dobro, steel guitar, backing vocals
- Tim Carter – banjo
- Eric B – guitar
- Tia Sprocket – backing vocals
- Rod Janzen – electric guitar
- Joe Fazzio – drums
- Travis "Skunky" Gillespie – harmonica

=== Production ===
- Hank Williams III – recording engineer, mix engineer
- Joe Buck – recording engineer
- Andy Gibson – recording engineer
- Jim Lightman – mixing engineer

== Chart positions ==
Chart (2006)	Peak position
U.S. Billboard Top Country Albums	17
U.S. Billboard 200	73
