= Sidewalk Records =

American record label

Sidewalk Records was a record label based in Hollywood, California that was started in 1963 by Mike Curb at the age of eighteen. The company was first formed as Sidewalk Productions and later became a subsidiary label of Capitol Records. Many recordings by Sidewalk Productions appeared on the related label Tower Records, also a subsidiary of Capitol Records. (This label is not affiliated with the record store chain of the same name, which started out in Sacramento, California)

Most of the LPs released on Sidewalk Records were soundtrack albums, mainly those of films released by American International Pictures. They were typically B-movies having to with motorcycle, auto racing and psychedelic themes, and exploitation movies. These included Thunder Alley, The Wild Racers, Psych-Out, The Trip, Three in the Attic, and Peter Fonda's The Wild Angels.

Guitarist Davie Allan and his group Davie Allan and The Arrows made several appearances on Sidewalk, though their main releases were on Tower. Allan and several other studio musicians also recorded many sessions that were released on 45 RPM singles under a wide variety of group names. Several singles were issued under Mike Curb's name. Songwriter Harley Hatcher was also a frequent contributor to the Sidewalk oeuvre.

Curb signed Burbank based group The Riptides and released a Curb-penned "Sally Ann" b/w "April" (Sidewalk 904) in spring of 1966. The Riptides went on to record "Last Wave of The Day" for the movie Mondo Hollywood (Tower DT-5083) in 1967. Other notable releases on the Sidewalk label were a novelty album by hippie street singer and health food advocate Gypsy Boots, sort of Sidewalk's answer to Tiny Tim, and the first single by Electric Flag featuring Mike Bloomfield and Buddy Miles.

The single of the Johnny Otis song "So Fine" b/w "Everybody Has His Own Ideas" by Stone Poneys (Sidewalk 937) represents Linda Ronstadt's first known recordings (from 1965); Mike Curb produced the recordings. The single was released in the latter part of 1966. Thus, this disk has become one of the rarest Linda Ronstadt collectables, bringing as much as $144 (in a 2007 eBay auction).

The label released about 20 LPs and several dozen 45 RPM singles. Mike sold the company out for a large amount of money, and was then appointed head of MGM Records in 1969. The related Tower Records label ceased operations around the same time. Mike Curb went on to run MGM Records throughout the 1970s, where he was instrumental in promoting the career of The Osmonds, Eric Burdon and War, Solomon Burke, Lou Rawls, and Sammy Davis Jr. He later formed Curb Records, which still exists today. Curb Records operates out of Nashville.

In April 2012, Curb Records announced the re-launch of Sidewalk Records with country singer Heidi Newfield as the flagship artist. Clay Walker also released his 2012 single "Jesse James", from his 2010 curb album She Won't Be Lonely Long, via Sidewalk.

On November 20, 2012 Tyler Dean's single "I Wanna Wake Up With You" Featuring Ashley Gearing was released on iTunes. February 5, 2013 Morgan Frazier's debut single "Yellow Brick Road" was released. On February 12, 2013 Dylan Scott's debut single "Makin' This Boy Go Crazy" was released.

== See also ==
- Sidewalk Records Discography
- List of record labels
