= Hank Williams III =

American musician (born 1972)

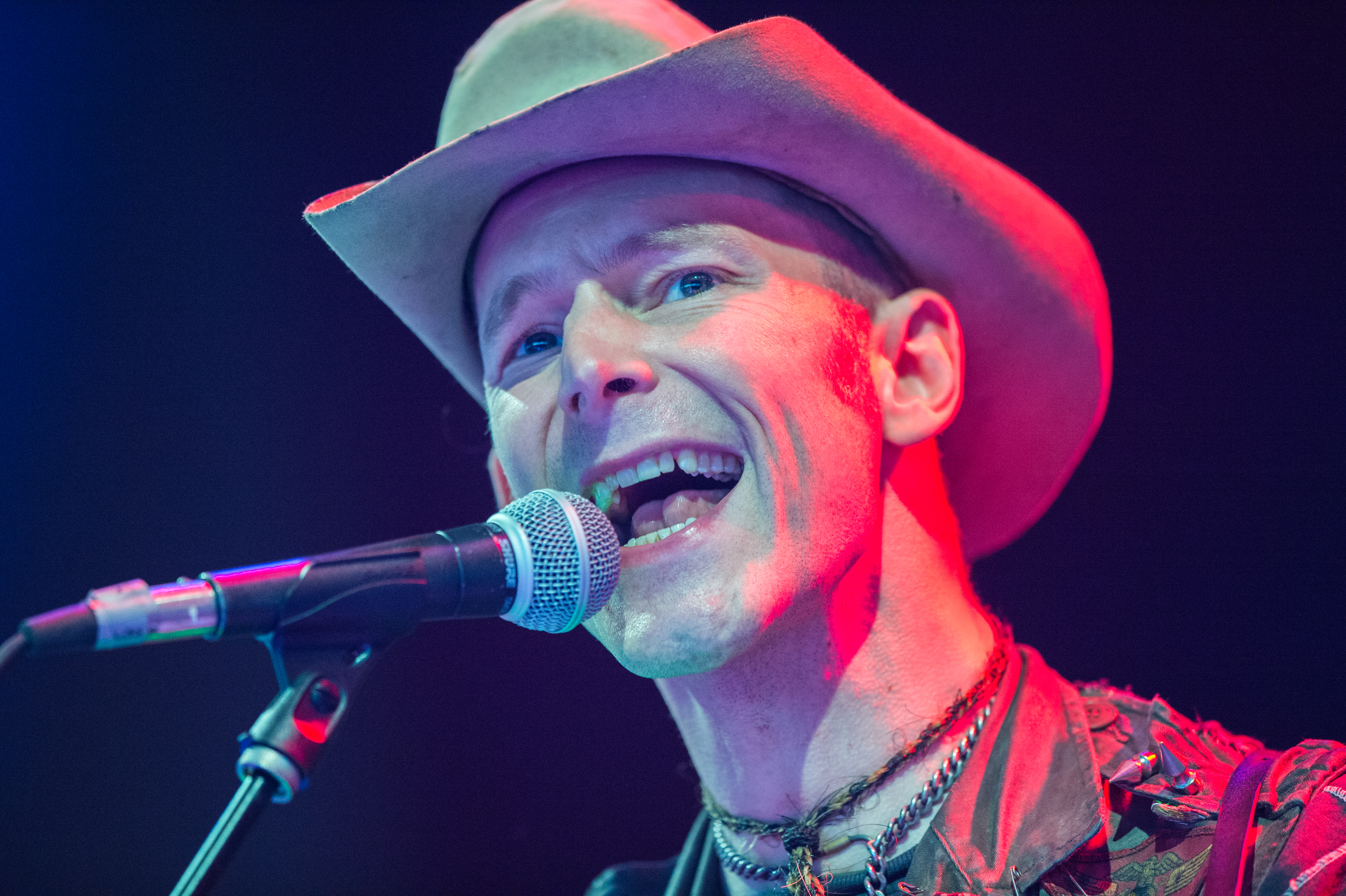
- Williams performing at Roskilde Festival 2012

Background information
- Also known as: Hank 3
- Born: Shelton Hank Williams; December 12, 1972 (age 53); Nashville, Tennessee, U.S
- Genres: Outlaw country; cowpunk; alt-country; heavy metal; psychobilly
- Occupations: Musician; songwriter; record producer
- Instruments: Vocals; guitar; bass; drums; keyboards; mandolin; banjo
- Years active: 1987–present
- Labels: Hank3; Megaforce; Curb
- Member of: Assjack; The Damn Band
- Formerly of: Arson Anthem; Superjoint Ritual

Shelton Hank Williams (born December 12, 1972), known professionally as Hank Williams III, is an American singer, songwriter, and multi-instrumentalist. Predominantly styled in country music, punk rock and heavy metal, he has released eleven studio albums including his first five on Curb Records.

Williams is the grandson of Hank Williams and the son of Hank Williams Jr.. He is also the nephew of Jett Williams, and half-brother to Holly Williams and Sam Williams. Additionally, he is the father of Coleman Williams.

In addition to his solo work, Williams was the drummer for hardcore punk band Arson Anthem, and bassist with the metal band Superjoint Ritual.

== Career ==
=== Early career ===
Williams spent much of his early career playing drums in punk rock bands during the late 1980s and early-to-mid-1990s. During this time frame, Williams was informed that he had fathered a son, Coleman Finchum, who was five years old by that time; a family court judge ordered Williams to find more stable employment so that Finchum could receive child support.

Williams later played bass guitar in the heavy metal band Superjoint Ritual, now renamed as Superjoint for legal reasons, led by Pantera vocalist Phil Anselmo. Williams also played drums for Arson Anthem, formed with Anselmo and Mike Williams of the sludge metal band Eyehategod.

=== Recordings for Curb Records (1996–2010) ===
Capitalizing on his family name and resemblance to his grandfather, he signed a contract with Nashville music industry giant Curb Records. Three Hanks: Men with Broken Hearts was issued shortly thereafter, which spliced together recordings to make it seem that three generations of Williams men were singing alongside one another. In the late 1980s, upon first meeting Hank Williams III, Minnie Pearl, a friend of Hank Williams Sr., reportedly said "Lord, honey, you're a ghost", as she was astonished by his striking resemblance to his grandfather.

The success of the "Three Hanks" album garnered Hank Jr. and Hank III a Vocal Duo of the Year nomination by the Academy of Country Music in 1997.

Williams's first solo album, Risin' Outlaw, was released in September 1999 to respectable sales and strong reviews, despite Williams's own hatred of the record.

In 2003, Williams recorded This Ain't Country for Curb, who chose not to release it. On May 17, 2011, Curb released the album under the title Hillbilly Joker, without the consent or input from Williams after his contract with the label had been terminated.

In 2006, after resolving a contractual dispute with Curb Records, Williams released Straight to Hell on Curb's rock imprint, Bruc. Battles with Walmart delayed the appearance of this album, which was released on February 28, 2006, as a two-disc set in two formats: a censored version (for Wal-Mart), and an uncensored version that was the first major-label country album ever to bear a parental advisory warning. Straight to Hell was also the first release through Curb's Bruc Records imprint. However, the uncensored version was released through Bruc, and the clean version was released through Curb. One of the songs, "Pills I Took", was written by Wisconsin group Those Poor Bastards, who originally released the song on their 2004 CD Country Bullshit.

Williams released Assjack's self-titled debut album on August 4, 2009, through Curb.

His next album, Rebel Within, was released in May 2010, and was his last album with Curb Records. It charted at number 20 in Billboard magazine.

Between 2012 and 2017, Curb would release a series of unauthorized compilations of Williams's music. In 2012, Curb released a Williams album titled Long Gone Daddy, marking the second album the company has released under his name since his departure. In 2014, Curb Records released a new album under Hank Williams III's name titled Ramblin' Man. The album contains previously unreleased material that Williams recorded while on their label. The following year, Curb released another Williams album of previously unreleased songs titled Take as Needed for Pain. The album is mostly a rock album but the single released was a country song titled "Ruby Get Back to the Hills". In 2017, Curb released a Greatest Hits album featuring select tracks from Williams's first four albums, mostly from Straight to Hell.

=== Independent releases (2011–present) ===
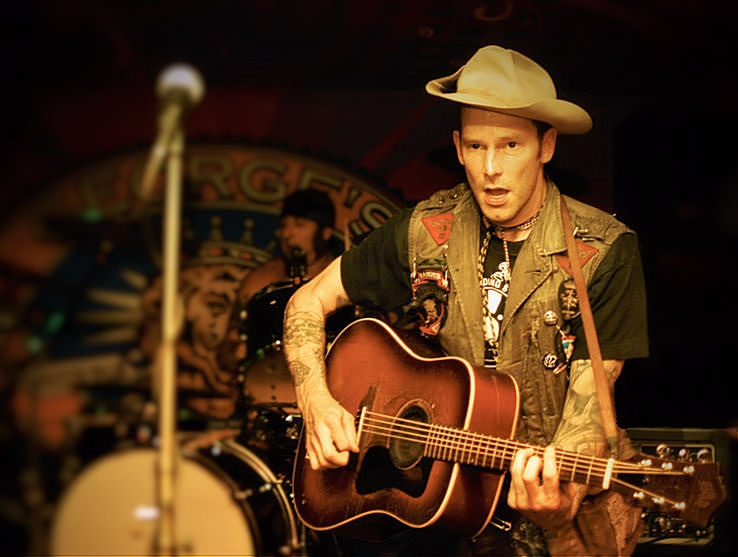
Williams in 2010

Williams released four new CDs in September 2011. Ghost to a Ghost/Gutter Town (a 2-disc country record with some ambient and folk influences), 3 Bar Ranch Cattle Callin' (a metal record in the newly anointed cattle core genre) and Attention Deficit Domination (a doom-rock record), were released under his label Hank3 Records through Megaforce Records, and featured guest appearances by Tom Waits, Les Claypool (Primus), Alan King (Hellstomper), Ray Lawrence Jr., Troy Medlin (Sourvein), Dave Sherman (Earthride) and Williams's dog, Trooper.

In 2013, Williams released two new albums: a country album Brothers of the 4×4 and punk album A Fiendish Threat, under the band name "3".

In 2018, Williams was featured on DevilDriver's cover of his song "Country Heroes", which appears on their album Outlaws 'til the End: Vol. 1. In 2021, he released a cover of the David Allan Coe song "You Never Even Called Me By My Name" on his YouTube channel. In 2024, he and David Allan Coe collaborated on Hardy's song "Live Forever".

Despite being largely inactive from the music industry since 2014, Williams's social media profiles are still sporadically active as of 2026.

== Musical style ==
Williams's lyrical themes include drug use, hedonism and the outlaw life, as well as criticism of the mainstream country music industry.

His live shows typically follow a Jekyll and Hyde format: a country music set featuring fiddle player David McElfresh and steel guitar player Dan Johnson, followed by a "hellbilly" set of cowpunk and psychobilly songs, and then an Assjack set, which consists of death metal and metalcore songs.

The lineup for Assjack includes the addition of supplemental vocalist Gary Lindsey and the departure of his fiddle and steel guitar players. McElfresh's predecessor was fellow-fiddle-player Michael "Fiddleboy" McCanless, who would play all three sets, adding traditional violin for the country set of the concert before turning on different effect pedals for later sets. Another former band member was guitarist Duane Denison, previously with The Jesus Lizard, who left The Damn Band and Assjack in January 2001 and later that year formed Tomahawk.

== Discography ==
Studio albums

- Risin' Outlaw (1999)
- Lovesick, Broke and Driftin' (2002)
- Straight to Hell (2006)
- Damn Right, Rebel Proud (2008)
- Rebel Within (2010)
- Hillbilly Joker (2011)
- Ghost to a Ghost/Gutter Town (Hank3 Records, 2011)
- 3 Bar Ranch Cattle Callin' (Hank3 Records, 2011)
- Attention Deficit Domination (Hank3 Records, 2011)
- Brothers of the 4×4 (Hank3 Records, 2013)
- A Fiendish Threat (Hank3 Records, 2013)
