= Suffer in Peace =

Studio album by Tyler Farr
- Released: April 28, 2015
- Genre: Country
- Length: 36:48
- Label: Columbia Nashville
- Producer: Jim Catino; Julian King

Tyler Farr chronology
Redneck Crazy (2013)	Suffer in Peace (2015)

Singles from Suffer in Peace
- 1. "A Guy Walks Into a Bar" Released: August 18, 2014; 2. "Withdrawals" Released: June 15, 2015; 3. "Better in Boots" Released: August 17, 2015

Suffer in Peace is the second studio album by American country music artist Tyler Farr, released on April 28, 2015, through Columbia Nashville. Following the success of his 2013 debut effort Redneck Crazy, Farr reteamed with producers Jim Catino and Julian King to work on new material for his next country album, carrying traditional content that spoke about his life while telling relatable stories. Reviews for the record were positive to mixed, with critics divided over the production and lyrical content. Suffer in Peace debuted at numbers two and four on the Top Country Albums and Billboard 200 charts, respectively. It spawned three singles: "A Guy Walks Into a Bar" (his first number-one country hit), "Withdrawals" and "Better in Boots" (both of which charted lower). After performing at NBC's Today on the album's release date and holding a concert the next day in Manhattan's Irving Plaza, Farr was set to tour with Lee Brice in February 2016 but had to go through surgery and be put on vocal rest. This would be Farr's last record for the label before leaving in September 2018 and signing with Jason Aldean's Night Train Records (a division of BBR Music Group) in March 2019.

== Background and development ==
While touring with Brantley Gilbert and Jason Aldean on their respective tours for promotion of his debut album Redneck Crazy (2013), Farr started performing material that would be part of his next country album. He expressed wanting to move into a more traditional direction, following the critical reception of both the album's title track and "Whiskey in My Water", both released in 2013, and the positive reviews given to "A Guy Walks Into a Bar" (2014). This gave him the mindset to work on material that was more than just typical country radio singles. Farr enlisted the same producers of his debut album, Jim Catino and Julian King. He chose the title Suffer in Peace because it had a dark underpinning to it and that there were two opposites in the words that make up the title. For the album's track listing, Farr co-wrote three songs and chose the rest based on what he felt represented his life and spoke to him as an artist. Suffer in Peace was released on April 28, 2015, by Columbia Nashville. It was also Farr's last album for Columbia Nashville, as in 2019 he signed to Night Train Records, a division of BBR Music Group owned by Jason Aldean.

== Music and lyrics ==
Opening track "C.O.U.N.T.R.Y." was described by Farr as a "rural country anthem" that he could picture being played at a party in his hometown of Missouri. The song utilizes a "swampy groove" that's described as sounding like "Hank Williams Jr. backed by ZZ Top." "A Guy Walks Into a Bar" uses the "old joke" as a setting for a brokenhearted man in a bar. Farr discovered the song while attending a writers' round, a popular Nashville setup for songwriters to share and perform new tracks, in a bar. One of the co-writers, Jonathan Singleton, was playing the song and was asked by him if he could record it. "Withdrawals" is a break-up song about relating that kind of pain to addiction. Farr said this was the last song to be added to the album and he was fascinated by the demo consisting of a piano and drum loop as its overall sound. His vocal delivery over the production was something he chose that made it transition from a country song to full-on storytelling. "Damn Good Friends" is a duet with fellow country singer Jason Aldean about genuine bonding with a true friend reminiscent of Tracy Lawrence's "Find Out Who Your Friends Are". Farr got the idea to have Aldean on the track when he was working on it and thought that it rang true about his camaraderie with him over the past year.

The title track is about a man who finds seclusion in the wilderness after being heartbroken by his ex-girlfriend. Farr explained that it represented what he felt was the entire theme of the album, saying it played out like an intriguing book and he didn't care that it wouldn't be played on the radio. "Raised to Pray" is about a teenager reveling in late night antics while attempting to flirt with a girl. "Better in Boots" is about telling a woman that her cowboy boots look much better on her than anything else she's wearing. The track uses a mixture of drum snaps and pop riffs to break up the album's overall country sound. "Poor Boy" revolves around a man with rural roots "getting the girl at the end of the day." "I Don't Even Want This Beer" is about dealing with your problems by hesitantly drinking alcohol. The album closer, "Why We Live Here", is a tribute to the troops song. Farr said that he wrote the track while on tour with the Navy in the Persian Gulf and that he wanted it to show "gratitude, respect and to honor the troops."

== Singles and promotion ==
The album's first single, "A Guy Walks Into a Bar", was released to country radio on August 18, 2014. It gave Farr his first number-one country hit on the Billboard Country Airplay chart. Its 42-week climb to that peak was the fifth longest climb to number one in the chart's 25-year history. It was certified gold by the Recording Industry Association of America (RIAA) on April 17, 2015. Its music video was directed by Jeff Venable and released on Farr's YouTube page on October 17, 2014. A second single, "Withdrawals", was released on June 15, 2015, but was only able to peak at numbers 47 and 52 on both the Billboard Hot Country Songs and Country Airplay charts, respectively. The single's music video was directed by Eric Welch and premiered on June 15, 2015. The third and final single, "Better in Boots", was released on August 17, 2015, following the studio's decision to remove "Withdrawals" from country radio and change for a more upbeat and female-friendly single. It peaked at number 26 on both the Country Airplay and Hot Country Songs charts respectively. A music video for the single, directed by Eric Welch, premiered in November 2015. While not released as a single, "Damn Good Friends" managed to reach number 46 on the Hot Country Songs chart.

On the album's release date, Farr promoted it by performing "A Guy Walks Into a Bar" live on NBC's Today. A day later, he held a concert at the Irving Plaza in Manhattan. Jon Caramanica of The New York Times described Farr's performance as "a hatless guy working the stage with an athletic, mildly menacing prowl, singing scratched-up country songs that weren’t coy about their arena-rock ambition." On November 18, 2015, Farr announced that he would co-headline a tour with Lee Brice called the Life Off My Years Tour, beginning on February 4, 2016, in Salisbury, Maryland and ending on April 3 in Toledo, Ohio. A week before the start of the tour, Farr revealed that he required surgery to remove a polyp from his vocal cords and be put on vocal rest, leaving Brice to fill his spot with Maddie & Tae, Clare Dunn and Jerrod Niemann. On June 16, Farr performed at the 2016 Country Jam in Grand Junction, Colorado. Taste of Country writer Annie Reuter praised him for performing an "energetic set" to the crowd, saying "his intensity made its way into the audience, no doubt much to the singer's appreciation."

== Reception ==
Professional ratings
Review scores
Source	Rating
AllMusic	3/5 stars
Billboard	4/5 stars
One Country	4/5
Renowned for Sound	4/5 stars
Spin	6/10

Suffer in Peace received positive to mixed reviews from music critics. Jewly Hight of Billboard gave the album high praise for Farr's vocal performance on tracks like "A Guy Walks Into a Bar" and "I Don't Even Want This Beer" that show both grit and grain while also revealing a bit of vulnerability in places, concluding that "[A]long with moments devoted to sentimentality and rural pride, it all adds up to one of country's richer portraits of masculinity in recent memory." Jason Scott of One Country praised Farr's storytelling abilities for taking "typical bro-country tropes" and create tales "netted together with pain, loss, love and hope", saying that "Suffer in Peace is a fearlessly bold sample of humanity, slicing the heart open and revealing far more depth than critics could have expected." Jamie Parmenter of Renowned for Sound commended Farr for bringing his "distinct edge of country" throughout the record like his debut effort while delivering the traditional country ballads, calling it "a triumph in what it sets out to achieve. It raises the heart rate when necessary, melts it when needed and lifts it at the right time; country runs through this album’s veins, from the old sounds to the new." Michael Rampa of Country Standard Time gave Farr credit for polishing the "full throttle swagger" from his debut record, pointing out "the melancholy ballads shine and redneck clichés are deftly finessed", but felt the material didn't make for a departure in Farr's overall artistry, saying it "neither [overly] impresses nor disappoints."

AllMusic's Stephen Thomas Erlewine found the album's pace to be slow without any party songs, however, he lauded ballads like "Criminal" and the title track for their respective charms, saying "these would've been placed in sharper relief if there were a fast tune or two as contrast." Anthony Easton of Spin felt the album contained nondescript country instrumentation and character portrayals, but found tracks like "Poor Boy" and "I Don't Even Want This Beer" as highlights, concluding that "When Farr gets introspective, he's worth hearing, but he doesn't do shallow well, and it's a shame that's his norm with only a couple exceptions per full-length."

Rolling Stone ranked Suffer in Peace number 31 on their list of the 40 Best Country Albums of 2015. The magazine's writer Jon Freeman said that Farr "proved he was much more versatile than his detractors thought" he'd turned out to be, saying he explores various aspects of love effortlessly. Freeman concluded that the title track shows that Farr "stakes his claim as one of country's most gifted stylists." In 2017, Billboard contributor Chuck Dauphin placed four tracks from the album on his top 10 list of Farr's best songs: "A Guy Walks Into a Bar" at number three, "Withdrawals" at number four, "Better in Boots" at number eight and "I Don't Even Want This Beer" at number nine.

Suffer in Peace debuted on the Billboard 200 at number four, and the Top Country Albums chart at number two, with first-week earnings of 41,629 equivalent album units (36,300 in traditional album sales). On the Billboard 200, it left the top 100 on the week of June 20, 2015, spending nine weeks on the chart. The album has sold 100,500 copies in the US as of November 2015. In Canada, it debuted and peaked at number 11 on the Canadian Albums chart for the week of May 16.

== Track listing ==
Suffer in Peace track listing
No.	Title	Writer(s)	Length
1.	"C.O.U.N.T.R.Y."	Chris Tompkins; Craig Wiseman; Rodney Clawson	3:22
2.	"A Guy Walks Into a Bar"	Jonathan Singleton; Melissa Pierce; Brad Tursi	3:16
3.	"Withdrawals"	Josh Kear; Gordie Sampson; Hillary Lindsey	3:45
4.	"Damn Good Friends" (featuring Jason Aldean)	Brent Anderson; Chris DuBois; Neil Medley	3:06
5.	"Suffer in Peace"	Aaron Barker; Phil O'Donnell	4:02
6.	"Raised to Pray"	Lance Miller; Adam Sanders; Brad Warren, Brett Warren	3:35
7.	"Criminal"	Dallas Davidson; Rhett Akins; Ashley Gorley	3:11
8.	"Better in Boots"	Justin Wilson; Dave Pittenger; Naomi Cooke	2:56
9.	"Poor Boy"	Tyler Farr; Davidson; Akins; Ben Hayslip	3:05
10.	"I Don't Even Want This Beer"	Farr; Wade Kirby; O'Donnell; Houston Phillips	3:13
11.	"Why We Live Here"	Farr; Davidson; Phillips	3:17
Total length:			36:48

== Personnel ==
Adapted from the album's liner notes.

Vocals

- Jason Aldean – duet vocals on "Damn Good Friends"
- Tyler Farr – lead vocals, background vocals
- Wes Hightower – background vocals

Production

- Jake Burns – assistant engineer
- Jim Catino – producer
- Julian King – producer, mixing
- Hank Williams – mastering

Instruments

- Dan Dugmore – electric guitar, steel guitar
- Julian King – keyboards, percussion
- David LaBruyere – bass guitar
- Troy Lancaster – electric guitar
- B. James Lowry – acoustic guitar, electric guitar, resonator guitar
- Miles McPherson – drums, percussion
- Jeff Roach – Hammond B-3 organ, keyboards, piano
- Adam Shoenfeld – electric guitar
- Derek Wells – acoustic guitar, electric guitar

== Charts ==
=== Weekly charts ===
Weekly chart performance for Suffer in Peace
Chart (2015–17)	Peak position
Australian Albums (ARIA)	66
Canadian Albums (Billboard)	11
US Billboard 200	4
US Top Country Albums (Billboard)	2

=== Year-end charts ===
Year-end chart performance for Suffer in Peace in 2015
Chart (2015)	Position
US Top Country Albums (Billboard)	39

== Release history ==
Release dates and formats for Suffer in Peace
Region	Date	Format(s)	Label	Ref.
United States	April 28, 2015	CD; digital download	Columbia Nashville	
