= American Young =

American country music duo

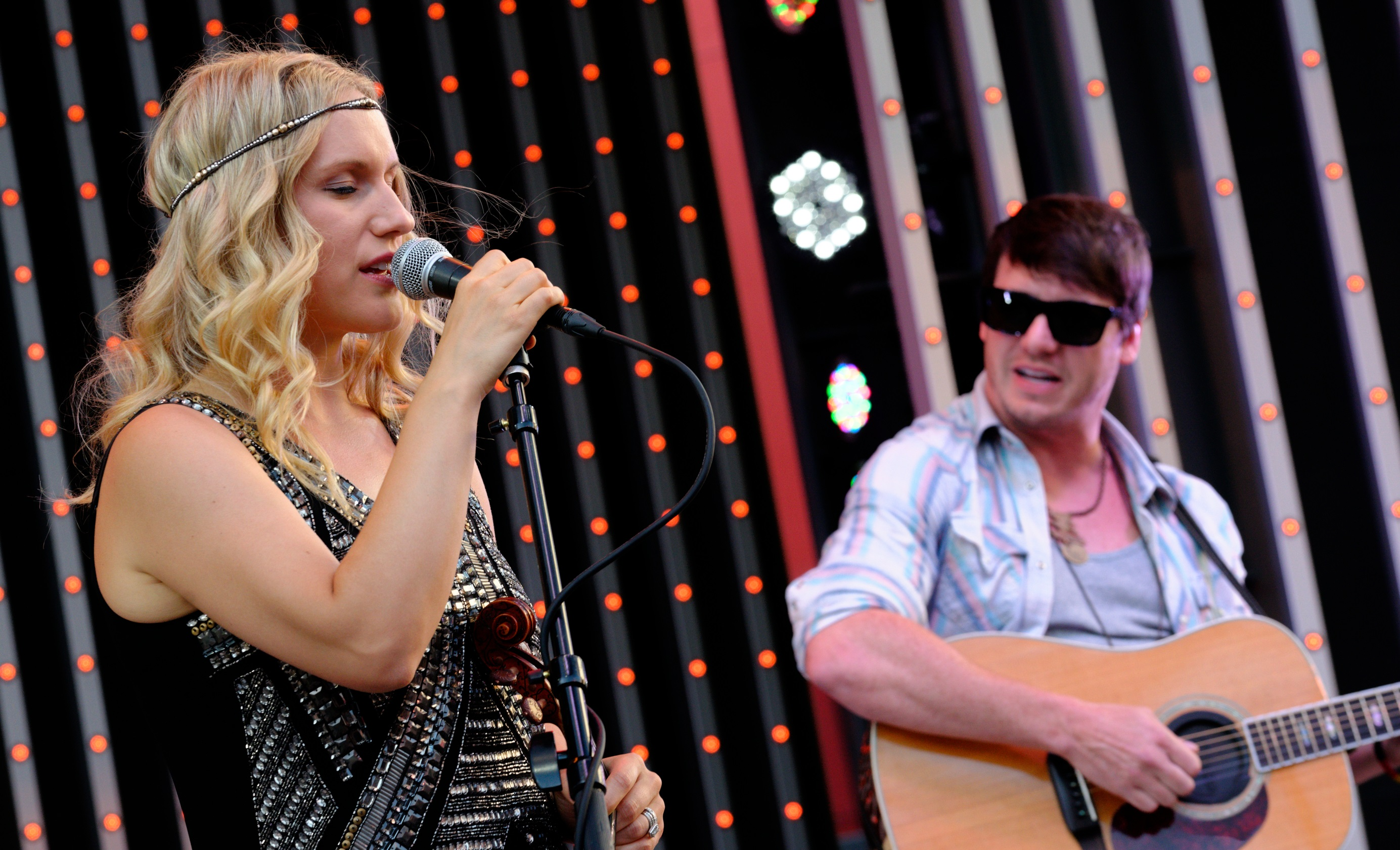
- American Young performing in 2014

Background information
- Origin: Nashville, Tennessee, U.S.
- Genre: Country
- Years active: 2013–present
- Label: Curb
- Spinoff of: Bomshel
- Members: Kristy Osmunson; Jon Stone

American Young is an American country music duo signed to Curb Records. The duo is composed of Kristy Osmunson, formerly of the group Bomshel, and songwriter/producer Jon Stone.

In late 2013, the duo released their debut single, "Love Is War", which has charted on Country Airplay. Billy Dukes of Taste of Country gave the song 4 out of 5 stars, comparing their sound favorably to The Civil Wars.

== Discography ==
=== Studio albums ===
Title	Album details
American Young	Release date: August 5, 2016; Label: Curb Records
AYII	Release date: November 19, 2021; Label: Curb Records

=== Extended plays ===
Title	Album details	Peak chart positions	
Title	Album details	US Country	US Heat
American Young	Release date: June 24, 2014; Label: Curb Records	39	12
Soundtrack of Your Life	Release date: August 23, 2019; Label: Curb Records		

=== Singles ===
Year	Single	Peak positions	Album
Year	Single	US Country Airplay	Album
2013	"Love Is War"	44	American Young
2014	"Wasn't Gonna Drink Tonight"	58	American Young

=== Music videos ===
Year	Video	Director
2013	"Love Is War"	Eric Welch
2016	"Be Here"	Chase Lauer

== Songs written by Jon Stone ==
Year	Title	Artist	Album
2006	"Me and My Gang"	Rascal Flatts	Me and My Gang
2010	"Seven Days"	Kenny Chesney	Hemingway's Whiskey
2010	"Kiss My Country Ass"	Blake Shelton	Hillbilly Bone
2012	"A Woman Like You"	Lee Brice	Hard 2 Love
2012	"Only God Could Love You More"	Jerrod Niemann	Free the Music

== Songs written by Kristy Osmunson ==
Year	Title	Artist	Album
2008	"Cheater, Cheater"	Joey + Rory	The Life of a Song
2009	"Fight Like a Girl"	Bomshel	Fight Like a Girl
2009	"19 and Crazy"	Bomshel	Fight Like a Girl
