= Catfight (disambiguation) =

Catfight is term for an altercation between two women.

Catfight may also refer to:

- Catfight (video game), a PC fighting video game
- Catfight (animal behavior)
- Catfight (professional wrestling)
- Catfight (film), a 2016 film directed by Onur Tukel
- Catfight (album), a 2006 album by Hefner
- "Catfight", an episode of Ben 10: Omniverse

== See also ==
- Dogfight (disambiguation)
- Girlfight (disambiguation)
