= Buffy Lawson =

American singer-songwriter

- Origin: Lexington, Kentucky, US
- Genres: Country
- Occupation: Singer-songwriter
- Instrument: singing
- Years active: 1996–present
- Labels: Curb; Wrinkled; KNL
- Formerly of: Bomshel
- Website: www.buffylawson.com Buffy Lawson discography at MusicBrainz

Buffy Lawson is an American country music singer formerly part of the music duo Bomshel. Bomshel was started in 2005 by lead singer Buffy "Buf" Lawson and fiddle player Kristy Osmunson, and together they signed with Curb Records. Bomshel's original lineup charted four singles on the Billboard Hot Country Songs charts and recorded an unreleased album called Bomshel Stomp. One of their songs, "The Power of One", was included in the soundtrack to the film Evan Almighty. Lawson departed in December 2007 and began her solo career signed under Wrinkled Records.

== Bio ==
Buffy Lawson was born in Lexington, Kentucky and began entertaining from an early age. She would drag every chair out of the family home into the back yard, charging neighbors five dollars to attend her shows. After graduating from high school Buffy moved to Nashville, Tennessee.

She began by singing demos for aspiring songwriters, then began to write her own songs, which led her to a staff writing positions at several publishers in Nashville. He voice caught the ear of producer Bob Gaudio, who teamed her with Neil Diamond to duet on "Marry Me" from his 1996 album, Tennessee Moon.

While attending a gig as Lorrie Morgan's back-up singer brought her to the attention of a music industry executive who was putting together a duo. Curb Records signed Bomshel to a recording contract. Opening slots for acts like Miranda Lambert, Brad Paisley and Trace Adkins followed.

"We had a fabulous band and a custom built bus, and I was able to play rock star," says Lawson. But after three years, Lawson made the decision to re-focus on her career as a songwriter. Soon after leaving Bomshel, she had songs recorded by Bo Bice, Willie Nelson, Kris Kristofferson, Randy Travis, Kenny Rogers and Dolly Parton. And then, after nearly 20 years in Nashville, she left and returned to Lexington.

One of her friends, Sandy Knox, started a label called Wrinkled Records and signed her.

Songwriter Walt Aldridge joined the team to produce the album. The first time she heard back her deeply personal "I'm Leaving You for Me", she knew she had made the right decision. "I just let go for these sessions. I sang from a place in my heart that didn't care if anyone heard it. I'm not chasing the magic anymore. I'm letting the magic find me."

== History ==
Buffy Lawson and Kristy Osmunson are the original members of the country group Bomshel. Prior to meeting, the two worked as songwriters in Nashville, with Lawson's writing credits including tracks for Mila Mason and Linda Davis. Osmunson met Lawson at a fan fair in Nashville. Lawson and Osmunson found that they worked well together, and decided to perform together. Buffy Lawson has toured nationally with such artists as Miranda Lambert, Montgomery Gentry, Luke Bryan, Brad Paisley and Joe Nichols among others. From duets with Neil Diamond, to writing songs for award-winning artists like Dolly Parton, Willie Nelson, Kris Kristofferson and Bo Bice, to touring as one half of the hit country duo Bomshel, Buffy Lawson makes a mark wherever she points her manicured finger.

=== 2006–2008: Bomshel Stomp ===
The duo first performed at Tootsie's Orchid Lounge in Nashville, Tennessee, where they would set up on Thursday nights to play their songs. Later, they began to play at several clubs throughout Nashville as well. By 2006, Bomshel was signed to Curb Records. Bomshel's first single, "Country Music Love Song", was released in early 2006, followed by the release of "Ain't My Day to Care". Respectively, these songs reached No. 49 and No. 44 on the country singles charts.

Bomshel's third single was titled "Bomshel Stomp". Originally written as a joke on Osmunson's birthday, "Bomshel Stomp" was intended as a "rave groove with a hillbilly song." While "Ain't My Day to Care" was charting, "Bomshel Stomp" was tested on radio stations throughout the state of Michigan. During mid-2006, it became the most-requested song on country radio stations in the state. It was then released as the duo's third single, peaking at No. 46. It was succeeded by "The Power of One", a cut from the soundtrack for the film Evan Almighty. Also in 2006, the duo released an extended play entitled Bomshel Stomp which featured the title track, "Country Music Love Song" and "Ain't My Day to Care".

In December 2007, after "The Power of One", Lawson left the duo. She was replaced by Arizona native Kelley Shepard.

=== 2012–present: I'm Leaving You for Me ===
In 2012, Lawson released the album I'm Leaving You for Me on Wrinkled Records, a Nashville label headed by songwriter Sandy Knox.

== Discography ==
=== Studio albums ===
Title	Album details
I'm Leaving You for Me	Release date: November 6, 2012; Label: Wrinkled Records; Formats: CD, music download
Meet Me Under The Mistletoe	Release date: December 3, 2014; Label: KNL Records; Formats: CD

=== Singles ===
Year	Single	Album
2012	"I'm Leaving You for Me"	I'm Leaving You for Me

=== Music videos ===
Year	Video	Director
2012	"I'm Leaving You for Me"	Bob Ridge
