= Redneck Crazy =

Studio album by Tyler Farr
- Released: September 30, 2013
- Recorded: 2013
- Genre: Country
- Length: 38:45
- Label: Columbia Nashville
- Producer: Jim Catino; Julian King

Tyler Farr chronology
Camouflage (2010)	Redneck Crazy (2013)	Suffer in Peace (2015)

Singles from Redneck Crazy
- 1. "Hot Mess" Released: February 6, 2012; 2. "Hello Goodbye" Released: August 27, 2012; 3. "Redneck Crazy" Released: February 25, 2013; 4. "Whiskey in My Water" Released: November 4, 2013

Redneck Crazy is the debut studio album by American country music artist Tyler Farr. It was released on September 30, 2013 via Columbia Nashville. Reviews for the record were mixed, with critics giving note to the lyrical content having various country music clichés. Redneck Crazy debuted at numbers two and five on the Top Country Albums and Billboard 200 charts, respectively. It spawned four singles: "Hot Mess", "Hello Goodbye", the title track, and "Whiskey in My Water".

== Singles ==
The album's first single, "Hot Mess" was released on February 6, 2012 but only reached number 49 on both the Billboard Country Airplay and Hot Country Songs charts, respectively. A second single, "Hello Goodbye", was released on August 27, 2012 but was only able to peak at numbers 47 and 52 on both the Billboard Hot Country Songs and Country Airplay charts, respectively. A music video for the single, directed by Darrin Dickerson, premiered in November 2012. The third single, the title track, peaked at numbers two and three on both the Billboard Hot Country Songs and Country Airplay charts, respectively. It was certified platinum by the Recording Industry Association of America (RIAA) on October 28, 2013. Its music video was directed by Jeff Venable and premiered on April 17, 2013. The fourth and final single, "Whiskey in My Water", was released on November 4, 2013 and reached numbers three and 11 on both the Billboard Country Airplay and Hot Country Songs charts, respectively. It was also certified platinum by the Recording Industry Association of America (RIAA) on February 7, 2018. The single's music video was directed by Chris Hicky and premiered on January 28, 2014.

== Reception ==
Professional ratings
Review scores
Source	Rating
AllMusic	3/5 stars
Country Weekly	B+
Roughstock	4/5 stars

Redneck Crazy received mixed reviews from music critics. Jon Freeman of Country Weekly thought that the album contained several "rural tropes" that "wear out their welcome later in the album", but thought that most of the songs were "interesting" for their lyrical content and Farr's "raspy, expressive voice". Matt Bjorke of Roughstock wrote that Farr's "strong, likable voice [that] is put to ample use on the eleven tracks held within and it also suggests there's even more to the man that we've only scratched the surface of." AllMusic's Stephen Thomas Erlewine was critical of the album containing country music clichés and production that's indebt to hip-hop but gave note of Farr's performance sounding "freshly showered and eminently respectable," concluding that "[T]his inherent politeness does mean his rowdy redneck ways feel a bit like schtick, but it's a good act performed with enough cheer that Farr's slickness sells Redneck Crazy whenever the tunes drift toward the generic." Jeffrey B. Remz of Country Standard Time criticized the overall content for utilizing "the three most standard clichés in country music" found in "Chicks, Trucks and Beer" and Farr's vocal delivery for being too hip-hop influenced and "raspy", concluding that "In reality, there's not a whole lot of excitement. Not when you're considering that Farr is trailing the pack, not trying to lead it."

In 2017, Billboard contributor Chuck Dauphin placed four tracks from the album on his top 10 list of Farr's best songs: "Hello Goodbye" at number one, the title track at number two, "Living with the Blues" at number six and "Hot Mess" at number seven.

Redneck Crazy debuted on the Billboard 200 at number five, and the Top Country Albums chart at number two, selling 29,000 copies in its first week and being the highest-charting debut by a new male country artist in two years. On the Billboard 200, it left the top 100 on the week of November 16, 2013, spending eight weeks on the chart. The album has sold 187,000 copies in the US as of May 2015.

== Track listing ==
No.	Title	Writer(s)	Length
1.	"Dirty"	Tyler Farr; Rhett Akins; Luke Laird	3:42
2.	"Makes You Wanna Drink"	Farr; Akins; Craig Wiseman	2:52
3.	"Redneck Crazy"	Josh Kear; Mark Irwin; Chris Tompkins	3:36
4.	"Whiskey in My Water"	Farr; Phillip LaRue; Jon Ozier	3:08
5.	"Hot Mess"	Dallas Davidson; Akins; Ben Hayslip	3:16
6.	"Hello Goodbye"	Farr; Kris Bergsnes; Skip Black	3:41
7.	"Ain't Even Drinkin'"	Farr; J.R. McCoy; Houston Phillips	3:36
8.	"Wish I Had a Boat"	Farr; Lee Brice; Vicky McGehee; Brian Davis	3:09
9.	"Chicks, Trucks and Beer" (featuring Colt Ford)	Akins; Wiseman	3:36
10.	"Cowgirl"	Erin Enderlin; Shane Minor; Phil O'Donnell	3:55
11.	"Living with the Blues"	Channing Wilson	4:14
Total length:			38:45

== Personnel ==
Credits adapted from the liner notes of Redneck Crazy.

Vocals

- Rhett Akins – background vocals
- Jim Catino – crowd noise
- Perry Coleman – background vocals
- Tyler Farr – lead vocals, background vocals
- Whitney Farr – crowd noise
- Colt Ford – duet vocals on "Chicks, Trucks, and Beer"
- Tania Hancheroff – background vocals
- Wes Hightower – background vocals
- Julian King – crowd noise
- Ben Maki – crowd noise
- Haley McLemore – crowd noise
- Risha Rodgers – crowd noise

Musicians

- Mike Brignardello – bass guitar
- Jim "Moose" Brown – keyboards
- Jake Burns – electric guitar
- Howard Duck – keyboards
- Dan Dugmore – dobro, electric guitar, steel guitar, mandolin
- Shannon Forrest – drums
- Kenny Greenberg – electric guitar
- Tony Harrell – keyboards
- Julian King – drum programming, percussion, synthesizer
- David LaBruyere – bass guitar
- Troy Lancaster – electric guitar
- B. James Lowry – acoustic guitar, resonator guitar
- Jerry McPherson – electric guitar
- Jeff Roach – synthesizer
- Channing Wilson – acoustic guitar
- Glenn Worf – bass guitar

== Charts ==
=== Weekly charts ===
Weekly chart performance for Redneck Crazy
Chart (2013–14)	Peak position
US Billboard 200	5
US Top Country Albums (Billboard)	2

=== Year-end charts ===
Year-end chart performance for Redneck Crazy in 2013
Chart (2013)	Position
US Top Country Albums	63

Year-end chart performance for Redneck Crazy in 2014
Chart (2014)	Position
US Top Country Albums	46

== Release history ==
Region	Date	Format	Label	Ref.
United States	September 30, 2015	CD, Digital download	Columbia Nashville	
