= Hot Mess =

Hot Mess may refer to:

== Music ==
- Hot Mess (album), 2009 album by Cobra Starship
- Hot Mess (EP), an EP by Dodie

=== Musicals ===
- Hot Mess (musical), 2025 Pop environmental musical by Jack Godfrey

=== Songs ===
- "Hot Mess" (Aespa song) (2024)
- "Hot Mess" (Cobra Starship song) (2009)
- "Hot Mess" (Tyler Farr song) (2012)
- "Hot Mess", a 2008 song by Sam Sparro from Sam Sparro
- "Hot Mess", a 2009 song by Ashley Tisdale from Guilty Pleasure
- "Hot Mess", a 2009 song by Uncle Kracker from Happy Hour
- "Hot Mess", a 2010 song by Chromeo from Business Casual
- "Hot Mess", a 2017 song by Girli
- "Hot Mess", a 2024 song by Taeyeon from Letter to Myself

== Film and television ==
- Hot Mess, a 2010 film written by and starring Kat Mills and Meaghan Oppenheimer
- Hot Mess, a 2020 Australian film directed by Lucy Coleman, nominated for the AACTA Award for Best Indie Film
- "Hot Mess", an episode of the TV series Pocoyo

== Books ==
- Diary of a Wimpy Kid: Hot Mess, a 2024 book written by Jeff Kinney
