= Bomshel =

American country music duo (2005–2012)

- Origin: Nashville, Tennessee, U.S.
- Genres: Country
- Years active: 2005–2012
- Label: Curb
- Spinoffs: American Young
- Past members: Buffy Lawson; Kristy Osmunson; Kelley Shepard

Bomshel (pronounced "bombshell") was an American country music duo founded in 2005 by lead vocalist Buffy "Buf" Lawson and backing vocalist/fiddle player Kristy Osmunson. Signed to Curb Records in 2005, Bomshel's original lineup charted four singles on the Billboard Hot Country Songs charts, and recorded an unreleased album called Bomshel Stomp. One of their songs, "The Power of One", was included in the soundtrack to the film Evan Almighty. Lawson departed in December 2007, and Kelley Shepard was chosen as her replacement. The new lineup of Shepard and Osmunson released four more singles, including "Fight Like a Girl" and "19 and Crazy," both of which reached the Country Top 40. In October 2009, Bomshel released its debut album, also titled Fight Like a Girl. Bomshel released Hallleluy'all in 2012 before disbanding, and Osmunson founded a second duo called American Young.

== History ==
Kristy Osmunson, a native of Sandpoint, Idaho moved to Nashville, Tennessee in early 2002. Prior to meeting, the two worked as songwriters in Nashville, with Lawson's writing credits include tracks for Mila Mason and Linda Davis. Osmunson met Lawson at a fan fair in Nashville. Lawson and Osmunson found that they worked well together, and decided to perform together.

=== 2006–2008: Bomshel Stomp ===
The duo first performed at Tootsie's Orchid Lounge in Nashville, Tennessee, where they would set up on Thursday nights to play their songs. Later, they began to play at several clubs throughout Nashville as well. By 2006, Bomshel was signed to Curb Records. Bomshel's first single, "It Was An Absolutely Finger-Lickin', Grits and Chicken, Country Music Love Song", was released in early 2006, followed by the release of "Ain't My Day to Care". Respectively, these songs reached No. 49 and No. 44 on the country singles charts.

Bomshel's third single was titled "Bomshel Stomp." Originally written as a joke on Osmunson's birthday, "Bomshel Stomp" was intended as a "rave groove with a hillbilly song." While "Ain't My Day to Care" was charting, "Bomshel Stomp" was tested on radio stations throughout the state of Michigan. During mid-2006, it became the most-requested song on country radio stations in the state. It was then released as the duo's third single, peaking at No. 46. It was succeeded by "The Power of One," a cut from the soundtrack for the film Evan Almighty. Also in 2006, the duo released an extended play entitled Bomshel Stomp which featured the title track, "Country Music Love Song" and "Ain't My Day to Care."

In December 2007, after "The Power of One," Lawson left the duo. She was replaced by Arizona native Kelley Shepard, who made her debut on the duo's fifth single, "Just This Way". It was followed by "Cheater, Cheater", which was later a top 30 hit for Joey + Rory in 2008.

=== 2009–2012: Fight Like a Girl and Halleluy'all ===
Bomshel made its fifth chart entry with "Fight Like a Girl" in early 2009. It became the duo's first Top 40 country hit, peaking at No. 30 on the U.S. Billboard Hot Country Songs chart. "19 and Crazy" followed in November 2009 as the album's second single, and was also a minor Top 40 hit on the chart. Both songs and "Just This Way" are included on Bomshel's debut album, Fight Like a Girl, released by Curb on October 20, 2009. The album was produced by Chuck Howard, except for "19 and Crazy", which Osmunson produced with the song's co-writers, Josh Kear and Mark Irwin. "Just Fine" was released as the album's third single on June 7, 2010. It debuted at No. 56 on the country chart for the week of July 3, 2010, and peaked at No. 53 two weeks later. In January 2010, the duo was nominated by the Academy of Country Music for Top New Duo.

Bomshel released the extended play Halleluy'all in July 2012. Its title track was released as a single, but did not chart. After its release, Bomshel broke up and Osmunson joined songwriter Jon Stone in the duo American Young, which also records for Curb.

== Charitable efforts ==
In late 2006, Bomshel put up a custom-built, autographed motorcycle, called the "Wicked Women of Tequila Rose Chopper", up for auction on CMT's auction website, CMTAuctions.com. Yellowstone Madonna of Michigan was the winner of the chopper. Proceeds from the auction went to the benefit of the Barbara Ann Karmanos Cancer Institute.

== Discography ==
=== Studio albums ===
Title	Album details	Peak chart positions	
Title	Album details	US Country	US
Fight Like a Girl	Release date: October 20, 2009; Label: Curb Records; Formats: CD, music download	24	87

=== Extended plays ===
Title	Album details
Bomshel Stomp	Release date: November 14, 2006; Label: Curb Records; Formats: CD, music download
Fight Like a Girl	Release date: April 14, 2009; Label: Curb Records; Formats: CD, music download
Halleluy'all	Release date: July 3, 2012; Label: Curb Records; Formats: CD, music download

=== Singles ===
Year	Single	Peak positions	Album
Year	Single	US Country	Album
2006	"Country Music Love Song"	49	Bomshel Stomp (EP)
2006	"Ain't My Day to Care"	44	Bomshel Stomp (EP)
2007	"Bomshel Stomp"	46	Bomshel Stomp (EP)
2007	"The Power of One"	52	Evan Almighty (soundtrack)
2008	"Just This Way"	—	Fight Like a Girl
2008	"Cheater, Cheater"	—	Fight Like a Girl (EP)
2009	"Fight Like a Girl"	30	Fight Like a Girl
2009	"19 and Crazy"	33	Fight Like a Girl
2010	"Just Fine"	53	Fight Like a Girl
2011	"Halleluy'all"	—	Halleluy'all (EP)
"—" denotes releases that did not chart

=== Music videos ===
Year	Single	Director
2009	"Fight Like a Girl"	Eric Welch
2010	"19 and Crazy"	Howard/Welch/Van
2010	"Just Fine"	Amanda Van Sandt

== Awards and nominations ==
Year	Association	Category	Result
2010	Academy of Country Music	Top New Vocal Duo	Nominated
