= Girlfight (disambiguation) =

Girlfight is a 2000 American film by Karyn Kusama, starring Michelle Rodriguez.

Girlfight or Girl Fight may also refer to:

- Girl Fight (film), a 2011 television film
- Girl Fight (video game), a 2013 fighting game
- Girlfight (song), a single by Brooke Valentine

== See also ==
- Catfight (disambiguation)
- Fight Girls
- Fighting Girl
- Fight Like a Girl (disambiguation)
