= Fight Like a Girl =

Fight Like a Girl may refer to:

== Music ==
- Fight Like a Girl (Bomshel album), 2009
  - "Fight Like a Girl" (Bomshel song), 2009
- Fight Like a Girl (Emilie Autumn album) or the title song, 2012
- "Fight Like a Girl" (Evanescence song), from the film Ballerina, 2025
- "Fight Like a Girl" (Kalie Shorr song), 2016
- "Fight Like a Girl", a song by Zolita, 2017

== Other uses ==
- Fight Like a Girl (book), a 2016 book by Clementine Ford
- Fight Like a Girl, a 2023 film starring Ama Qamata

== See also ==
- Like a Girl (commercial)
