= Better on You =

Better on You may refer to:

- "Better on You", a 2019 single by Jojo Mason
- "Better on You", a 2014 single by American Young
