= Fight Like a Girl (Bomshel album) =

Studio album by Bomshel
- Released: October 20, 2009
- Genre: Country
- Length: 37:27
- Label: Curb
- Producer: Chuck Howard; Mark Irwin; Josh Kear; Kristy Osmunson

Bomshel chronology
Bomshel Stomp (2006)	Fight Like a Girl (2009)	Halleluy'all (2012)

Singles from Fight Like a Girl
- 1. "Fight Like a Girl" Released: February 16, 2009; 2. "19 and Crazy" Released: September 28, 2009; 3. "Just Fine" Released: May 24, 2010

Fight Like a Girl is the only studio album by American country music duo Bomshel. It was released on October 20, 2009 via Curb Records. Its lead-off single, the title track, peaked at number 30 in June 2009, thus becoming the duo's first Top 30 country hit. "19 and Crazy" and "Just Fine" were released as the album's second and third singles, respectively; the former was another Top 40 hit with a peak of number 33, while the latter peaked at number 53.

== History ==
Originally composed of Buffy Lawson and Kristy Osmunson, Bomshel first charted in 2006 with "It Was an Absolutely, Finger-Lickin', Grits and Chicken, Country Music Love Song." Neither this song nor the duo's next three singles – "Ain't My Day to Care", "Bomshel Stomp", or "The Power of One" – made top 40 on the country music charts. In addition, the duo did not have a full studio album release after its fourth single. Lawson subsequently left the duo in 2007, with Kelley Shepard taking her place. Shepard and Osmunson released "Just This Way" in 2008, followed by "Cheater, Cheater." While "Just This Way" never charted, "Cheater, Cheater" was a number 30 hit for Joey + Rory in early 2009.

In mid-2009, Bomshel entered the country Top 40 for the first time with "Fight Like a Girl", which the duo wrote with Bob Regan. This song peaked at number 30 approximately a month before the album's release, followed by "19 and Crazy", which became the duo's second Top 40 country hit. Also included on the album is a cover of No Doubt's "Just a Girl."

== Critical reception ==
Thom Jurek of AllMusic gave the album two stars out of five, saying, "there are nine solidly written [songs], a good one, and a throwaway", but adding that he thought the production made it sound "more like it was recorded by machines than by people." Bobby Peacock of Roughstock gave it a positive review, calling it "brash and ballsy, anchored with well-chosen and often female-empowering themes" and saying that the lyrics use "cleverly-chosen details, unusual hooks and interesting turns of phrase."

== Track listing ==
All tracks are written by Kelly Shepard and Kristy Osmunson, except track 10, with additional writers noted.

Fight Like a Girl track listing
No.	Title	Writer(s)	Length
1.	"19 and Crazy"	Mark Irwin; Josh Kear	3:55
2.	"Just Fine"	Lee Brice	3:12
3.	"Arizona"	Jack Sizemore	3:49
4.	"Fight Like a Girl"	Bob Regan	3:34
5.	"Just This Way"	Regan	3:39
6.	"Karma Is a Female Dog"	Drew Davis; Jesse Lee	2:35
7.	"Love Me for Me"	Regan	3:49
8.	"You"	Regan	3:14
9.	"Thank You"	Regan	3:34
10.	"Just a Girl"	Tom Dumont; Gwen Stefani	2:52
11.	"Fiddle"	Jeff Ross	3:14
Total length:			37:27

== Personnel ==
Compiled from liner notes.

=== Bomshel ===
- Kristy Osmunson – background vocals, fiddle, mandolin, electric guitar, acoustic guitar, strings
- Kelley Shepard – lead vocals

=== Additional musicians ===
- Mike Brignardello – bass guitar
- Pat Buchanan – electric guitar
- Gary Burnette – acoustic guitar
- Chad Cromwell – drums
- Howard Duck – keyboards
- Shawn Fichter – drums
- Trey Hill – acoustic guitar
- Chuck Howard – electric guitar, percussion, programming
- Striker Howard – electric guitar
- Brent Mason – electric guitar
- Greg Morrow – drums
- Russ Pahl – electric guitar, banjo, Dobro, pedal steel guitar
- Brian Pruitt – drums
- Danny Rader – electric guitar, acoustic guitar
- Rich Redmond – drums
- Michael Rojas – keyboards
- Joe Schneider – bass guitar
- Paul Scholten – programming
- Adam Shoenfeld – electric guitar
- Michael Spriggs – acoustic guitar
- John Willis – electric guitar, acoustic guitar, banjo
- Glenn Worf – bass guitar
- Ronnie Yates – drums
- Craig Young – bass guitar
- Jonathan Yudkin – banjo, mandolin

=== Technical ===
- Chuck Howard – production (all tracks except "19 and Crazy"), engineering, overdubbing, mixing
- Mark Irwin – production ("19 and Crazy" only)
- "A.J." – overdubbing
- Josh Kear – production ("19 and Crazy" only)
- Kristy Osmunson – production ("19 and Crazy" only), engineering, overdubbing
- Craig White – engineering, overdubbing, mixing

== Chart performance ==
Chart (2009)	Peak position
U.S. Billboard 200	87
U.S. Billboard Top Country Albums	24
