= Tyler Farr =

American country singer (born 1984)

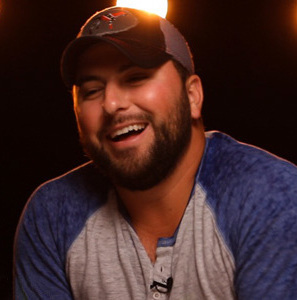
- Farr at Walmart Soundcheck in 2013

Background information
- Born: Tyler Lynn Farr; February 5, 1984 (age 42); Garden City, Missouri, U.S.
- Origin: Nashville, Tennessee, U.S.
- Genre: Country
- Occupations: Singer; songwriter
- Instruments: Vocals; guitar
- Years active: 2010–present
- Labels: BNA; Columbia Nashville; Broken Bow Records; Night Train Records
- Website: tylerfarr.com

Tyler Lynn Farr (born February 5, 1984) is an American country music singer and songwriter. Originally signed to BNA Records Farr released two singles for the label before it closed. He transferred to Columbia Records Nashville, releasing two albums: Redneck Crazy in 2013 and Suffer in Peace in 2015. Overall he has charted eight singles on the Billboard Hot Country Songs and Country Airplay charts. His highest ranking on the latter chart is "A Guy Walks Into a Bar" which placed at No. 1 in 2015.

== Career ==
Tyler Farr grew up in Garden City, Missouri, and attended Missouri State University, getting a degree in voice.

Farr co-wrote the songs "Hey Y'all" for Cole Swindell and "She's Just Like That" for Joe Nichols. In early 2012, Farr released his debut single, "Hot Mess" which he co-wrote with Rhett Akins. Billy Dukes of Taste of Country gave the song four stars out of five, calling Farr's voice "unique, but not distracting." Following the merger of his original label, BNA Records, Farr moved to Columbia Nashville and released his second single, "Hello Goodbye". His third single, "Redneck Crazy", became his first Top 10 hit in 2013. Next was the top 3 hit "Whiskey in My Water". All four singles were included on his debut album, Redneck Crazy which was released on September 30, 2013.

Farr led off his second album in mid-2014 with "A Guy Walks Into a Bar". The album, entitled Suffer in Peace, was released on April 28, 2015, and "A Guy Walks Into a Bar" became Farr's first No. 1 single on Billboard Country Airplay in May 2015. The album's second single, "Withdrawals", was released to country radio on June 15, 2015. It had only reached number 52 on the Country Airplay chart when it was pulled from radio and "Better in Boots" was issued as a third single on August 17, 2015. The decision to change the single was made in order to give Farr an up-tempo, "female-friendly" song that he could sing live, according to Steve Hodges of Sony Nashville.

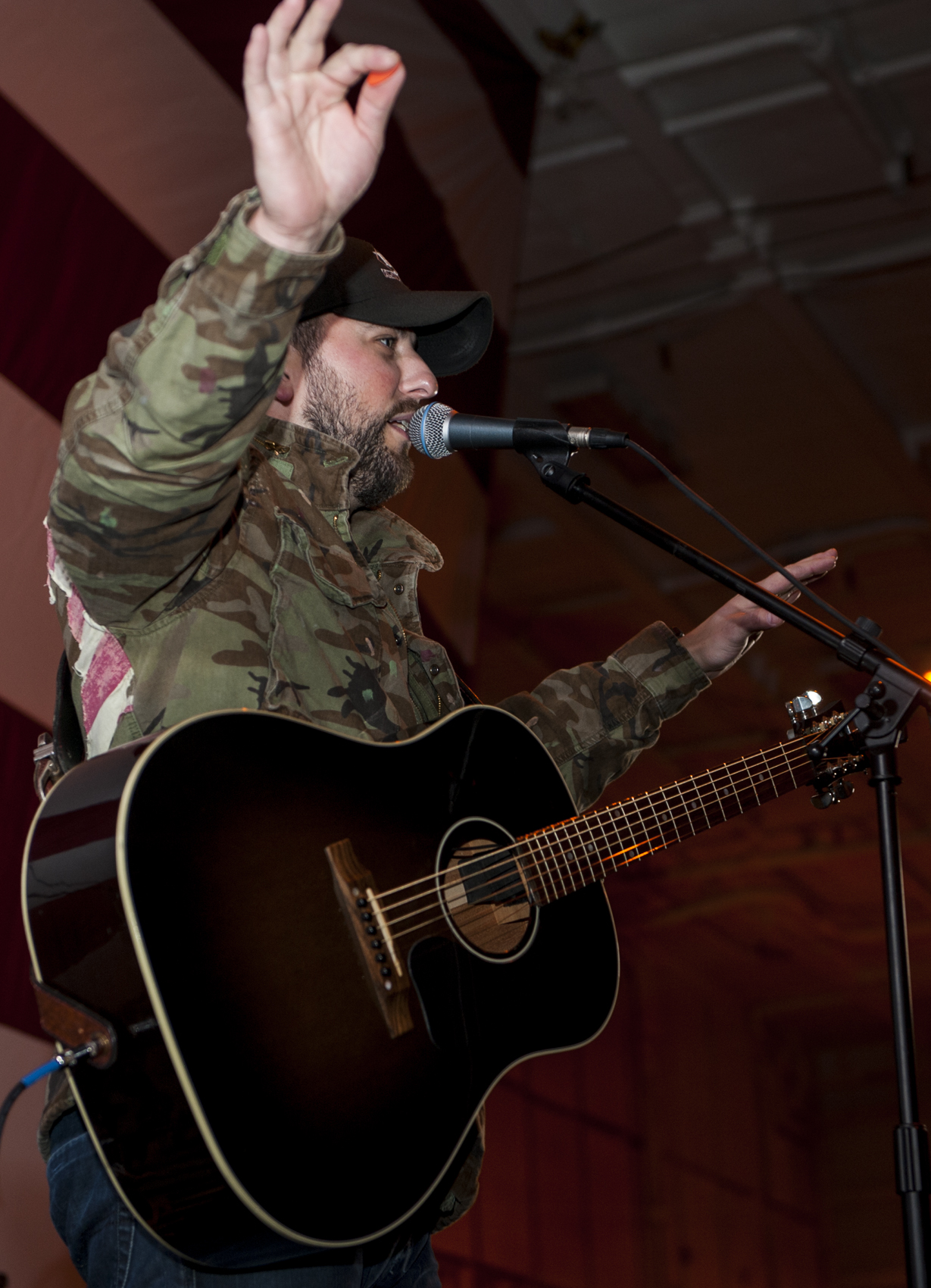
Farr performing in 2014

"Our Town", Farr's eighth single release, was issued in late 2016. Singer Seth Ennis co-wrote the song.

In September 2018, Farr parted ways with Sony Music Nashville. Farr signed with Broken Bow Records in March 2019 under Jason Aldean's newly founded imprint Night Train Records, and released the EP Only Truck in Town on June 5, 2020. The title track and "Soundtrack to a Small Town Sundown" were released as singles.

== Musical styles ==
Farr is also a classically trained opera singer and took voice lessons during his teenage years; he sang tenor in Missouri's All-State Choir during his senior year of high school. He claims he discovered (and fell in love with) country music after his mother married George Jones' touring guitarist.

== Personal life ==
Farr married his long-time girlfriend, Hannah Freeman on October 10, 2016.

== Discography ==
=== Studio albums ===
Title	Details	Peak chart positions				Sales
Title	Details	US Country	US	AUS	CAN	Sales
Redneck Crazy	Release date: September 30, 2013; Label: Columbia Nashville	2	5	—	—	US: 187,000
Suffer in Peace	Release date: April 28, 2015; Label: Columbia Nashville	2	4	66	11	US: 100,500
"—" denotes releases that did not chart

=== Extended plays ===
Title	Details
Camouflage	Release date: September 7, 2010; Label: BNA Records
Only Truck in Town	Release date: June 5, 2020; Label: Broken Bow Records/Night Train
Rednecks Like Me	Release date: July 14, 2023; Label: Broken Bow Records/Night Train
Quit Bein' Country	Release date: November 7, 2025; Label: Droptine Recordings

=== Singles ===
Year	Single	Peak chart positions					Certifications	Sales	Album
Year	Single	US Country Songs	US Country Airplay	US	CAN Country	CAN	Certifications	Sales	Album
2012	"Hot Mess"	49		—	—	—			Redneck Crazy
2012	"Hello Goodbye"	52	47	—	—	—			Redneck Crazy
2013	"Redneck Crazy"	2	3	29	7	57	RIAA: 2× Platinum; MC: Gold	US: 967,000	Redneck Crazy
2013	"Whiskey in My Water"	11	3	52	10	73	RIAA: Platinum	US: 548,000	Redneck Crazy
2014	"A Guy Walks Into a Bar"	7	1	51	9	67	RIAA: Platinum	US: 502,000	Suffer in Peace
2015	"Withdrawals"	47	52	—	—	—			Suffer in Peace
2015	"Better in Boots"	26	26	— (Note: "Better in Boots" did not enter the Hot 100, but peaked at number 25 on Bubbling Under Hot 100 Singles, which acts as a 25-song extension of the Hot 100.)	43	—		US: 131,000	Suffer in Peace
2016	"Our Town"	—	53	—	—	—		US: 8,000	—N/a
2017	"I Should Go to Church Sometime"	—	56	—	—	—			—N/a
2018	"Love by the Moon"	—	57	—	—	—			—N/a
2020	"Only Truck in Town"	—	60	—	—	—			Only Truck in Town
2020	"Soundtrack to a Small Town Sundown"	—	—	—	—	—			Only Truck in Town
2025	"Coming to a Bar Near You"	—	—	—	—	—			Quit Bein' Country
"—" denotes releases that did not chart

==== Promotional singles ====
Year	Single	Album
2015	"Suffer in Peace"	Suffer in Peace

=== Other charted songs ===
Year	Single	Peak chart positions		Sales	Album
Year	Single	US Country	US Country Airplay	Sales	Album
2015	"Blue Christmas"	—	56		—N/a
2015	"Damn Good Friends" (with Jason Aldean)	46	—	US: 17,000	Suffer in Peace
"—" denotes releases that did not chart

=== Music videos ===
Year	Video	Director
2012	"Hello Goodbye"	Darrin Dickerson
2013	"Redneck Crazy"	Jeff Venable
2014	"Whiskey in My Water"	Chris Hicky
2014	"A Guy Walks Into a Bar"	Jeff Venable
2015	"Withdrawals"	Eric Welch
2015	"Better in Boots"	Eric Welch
2018	"Love By The Moon"	

== Filmography ==
Year	Title	Role	Notes
2016	Ridiculousness	Himself	Episode: "Tyler Farr"
2019–present	Buck Commander	Himself	with Willie Robertson and Adam LaRoche
