= Tennessee Moon =

Studio album by Neil Diamond
- Released: February 6, 1996
- Recorded: 1995
- Studios: The Castle and Dark Horse Recording Studios (Franklin, Tennessee); The Soundshop, Javelina Recording Studios, Masterfonics and Loud Recording (Nashville, Tennessee)
- Genre: Country
- Length: 68:03
- Label: Columbia
- Producers: Don Cook; Bob Gaudio; Richard Landis; James Stroud; Paul Worley

Neil Diamond chronology
The Christmas Album, Volume II (1994)	Tennessee Moon (1996)	The Movie Album: As Time Goes By (1998)

Professional ratings
Review scores
Source	Rating
Allmusic	3/5 stars

Tennessee Moon is the twenty-third studio album by Neil Diamond. Released in February 1996, it is the product of a collaboration with various country music songwriters and performers. A companion television special entitled Under a Tennessee Moon was aired on ABC. The album was certified gold by the RIAA.

== Track listing ==
No.	Title	Writer(s)	Length
1.	"Tennessee Moon"	Neil Diamond, Dennis Morgan	3:00
2.	"One Good Love" (with Waylon Jennings)	Neil Diamond, Gary Nicholson	4:18
3.	"Shame" (with Hal Ketchum)	Neil Diamond, Hal Ketchum	3:31
4.	"A Matter of Love"	Neil Diamond, Tom Shapiro	4:35
5.	"Marry Me" (with Buffy Lawson)	Neil Diamond, Tom Shapiro	3:50
6.	"Deep Inside of You" (with Beth Nielsen Chapman)	Beth Nielsen Chapman, Neil Diamond	3:51
7.	"Gold Don't Rust"	Gary Burr, Bob DiPiero, Neil Diamond	3:42
8.	"Like You Do" (with Rosemary Butler)	Sandy Knox, Steve Rosen	4:03
9.	"Can Anybody Hear Me"	Neil Diamond, Bill LaBounty	3:50
10.	"Win the World"	Neil Diamond, Susan Longacre	4:12
11.	"No Limit"	Richard Bennett, Neil Diamond	3:07
12.	"Reminisce for a While" (with Raul Malo)	Neil Diamond, Raul Malo	4:27
13.	"Kentucky Woman"	Neil Diamond	2:48
14.	"If I Lost My Way"	Gary Burr, Neil Diamond	3:23
15.	"Everybody"	Jesse Diamond, Neil Diamond	3:45
16.	"Talking Optimist Blues (Good Day Today)"	Neil Diamond, Gretchen Peters	2:53
17.	"Open Wide These Prison Doors"	Neil Diamond, Stewart Harris	4:30
18.	"Blue Highway" (with Chet Atkins)	Neil Diamond, Harlan Howard	3:56

== Personnel ==
Musicians

- Neil Diamond – vocals
- Dennis Burnside – acoustic piano (1), Hammond B3 organ (1)
- Alan Lindgren – Hammond B3 organ (2, 9), acoustic piano (5, 6, 8, 9, 12), keyboards (8, 14, 15), arrangements (8, 15)
- Matt Rollings – acoustic piano (3, 7, 10, 13, 16–18), Hammond B3 organ (4)
- Jo-El Sonnier – accordion (3)
- Al Kooper – Hammond B3 organ (17)
- Bob Gaudio – Kurzweil accordion (17)
- Mark Casstevens – acoustic guitar (1)
- Brent Mason – electric guitar (1, 3, 13)
- Dan Dugmore – acoustic guitar (2, 5, 8–10, 12, 14, 17), pedal steel guitar (2, 5, 6, 8, 12, 14), electric guitar (6, 7, 9, 14)
- Gary Nicholson – acoustic guitar (2)
- Doug Rhone – acoustic guitar (2, 5, 6, 9, 12, 14, 15), electric guitar (9, 17)
- Richard Bennett – acoustic guitar (3–6, 8, 11, 13, 15, 16, 18), electric guitar (3, 4, 7, 10, 12, 17), mandolin (3, 8), guitarphone (3, 8)
- Hal Ketchum – acoustic guitar (3)
- Steve Gibson – acoustic guitar (4, 13, 16, 18)
- Chris Leuzinger – electric guitar (4)
- Brent Rowan – electric guitar (4, 16, 18)
- Biff Watson – acoustic guitar (7, 10, 17)
- Paul Worley – acoustic guitar (7)
- Dann Huff – electric guitar (13)
- Gary Burr – acoustic guitar (14)
- Chet Atkins – acoustic guitar (18)
- Bruce Bouton – pedal steel guitar (1, 3, 4, 10, 13, 16), lap steel guitar (7)
- Sam Bush – mandolin (7), fiddle (7)
- Michael Rhodes – bass (1, 4, 7, 10, 17)
- Reinie Press – bass (2, 5, 6, 9, 11, 12, 14, 15)
- David Hungate – bass (3, 13, 16), upright bass (18)
- Dave Pomeroy – fretless bass (8)
- Lonnie Wilson – drums (1), percussion (1)
- Ron Tutt – drums (2, 5, 6, 9, 11, 12, 14, 15)
- Paul Leim – drums (3, 4, 13, 16, 18)
- Chester Thompson – drums (7, 10, 17)
- Sam Bacco – percussion (3–7, 9, 10, 12–14, 16–18)
- Rob Hajacos – fiddle (1, 4, 9, 16, 18), hoedown tools (1)
- Jonathan Yudkin – fiddle (3, 13)
- Andrea Zonn – fiddle (5, 10, 14)
- Tammy Rogers – fiddle (6, 17)
- Mark O'Connor – fiddle (15)
- Bergen White – arrangements (5, 10, 12)
- The Nashville String Machine – strings (5, 8, 10, 12, 15)
- Carl Gorodetzky – string contractor (5, 8, 10, 12, 15)

Background and guest vocalists

- John Wesley Ryles – backing vocals (1, 4, 7, 9)
- Dennis Wilson – backing vocals (1, 7)
- Waylon Jennings – vocals (2)
- Hal Ketchum – vocals (3), backing vocals (3)
- Jana King – backing vocals (3, 13, 15, 16, 18)
- Curtis Wright – backing vocals (3, 13, 15, 16, 18)
- Curtis Young – backing vocals (3, 13, 15, 16, 18)
- Stephanie Bentley – backing vocals (4)
- Buffy Lawson – vocals (5), backing vocals (7, 10)
- Beth Nielsen Chapman – vocals (6)
- Debra Black – backing vocals (7, 10)
- Harry Stinson – backing vocals (7)
- Kathy Burdick – backing vocals (9)
- Bill LaBounty – backing vocals (9)
- Melodie Crittenden – backing vocals (11)
- Bob Gaudio – backing vocals (11)
- Raul Malo – vocals (12)
- Gary Burr – backing vocals (14)
- Beth Hooker – backing vocals (14)
- Chet Atkins – backing vocals (18)

== Production ==
- Bob Gaudio – executive producer, producer (2, 4–12, 14–18)
- Don Cook – producer (1)
- Richard Landis – producer (3, 13)
- James Stroud – producer (3, 13)
- Paul Worley – producer (7, 8)
- Scott Johnson – production assistant (1)
- Marissa Creager – Nashville production coordinator
- Sam Cole – project coordinator, photo montage
- David Kirschner – art direction
- Gabrielle Raumberger – design
- Dylan Tran – design
- Jeff Dunas – front cover photography
- Ed Rode – back cover photography
- Rex Perry – photo montage
- Bill Whitten – costumer

Technical credits

- Doug Sax – mastering at The Mastering Lab (Hollywood, California)
- Gavin Lurssen – mastering assistant
- Mike Bradley – engineer (1), mixing (1)
- Bernie Becker – engineer (2, 5, 6, 8, 9, 11, 12, 14, 15)
- Justin Niebank – mixing (2, 4–12, 14–18), engineer (3, 4, 7, 10, 13, 16–18)
- Chris Lord-Alge – mixing (3, 13)
- Mark Capps – assistant engineer, mix assistant
- Chris Davie – assistant engineer, mix assistant
- Eric Elwell – assistant engineer
- Mark Hagan – mix assistant
- David Hall – assistant engineer
- Joe Hayden – assistant engineer
- Sandy Jenkins – assistant engineer
- Greg Parker – assistant engineer
- Mike Psanos – assistant engineer
- Mark Ralston – assistant engineer
- Rhett Travis – assistant engineer
- King Williams – assistant engineer

== Charts ==
=== Weekly charts ===
Chart (1996)	Peak position
Australian Albums (ARIA)	2
Canadian Country Albums (RPM)	3
New Zealand Albums (RMNZ)	13
Scottish Albums (Official Charts)	33
UK Albums (Official Charts)	12
US Billboard 200	14
US Top Country Albums (Billboard)	3

=== Year-end charts ===
Chart (1996)	Position
Australian Albums (ARIA)	20
US Billboard 200	173
US Top Country Albums (Billboard)	21

== Certifications ==
Region	Certification	Certified units/sales
Australia (ARIA)	2× Platinum	150,000
New Zealand (RMNZ)	Gold	7,500^{^}
United Kingdom (BPI)	Silver	60,000^{^}
United States (RIAA)	Gold	500,000^{^}
^{^} Shipments figures based on certification alone.
