= Better in Boots =

Single by Tyler Farr

from the album Suffer in Peace
- Released: August 17, 2015
- Recorded: 2014–15
- Genre: Country
- Length: 2:56
- Label: Columbia Nashville
- Songwriters: Naomi Cooke; Justin Wilson; Dave Pittenger
- Producers: Jim Catino; Julian King

Tyler Farr singles chronology
"Withdrawals" (2015)	"Better in Boots" (2015)	"Our Town" (2016)

"Better in Boots" is a song recorded by American country music artist Tyler Farr. It was released to radio on August 17, 2015, by Columbia Nashville as the third and final single from his second studio album Suffer in Peace. The album's previous single, "Withdrawals" was pulled from country radio, being replaced by "Better in Boots". The song was written by former Runaway June lead vocalist Naomi Cooke, Justin Wilson and Dave Pittenger.

"Better in Boots" garnered better chart success than "Withdrawals", peaking at number 26 on both the Billboard Country Airplay and Hot Country Songs charts respectively. It has sold 131,000 units in the United States as of March 2016. It also charted in Canada, reaching number 43 on the Canada Country chart. An accompanying music video for the song, directed by Eric Welch, features Farr performing in a barn with his band, and is intercut with scenes of archery, lassoing and a silo dance party.

== Critical reception ==
An uncredited Taste of Country review stated that ""Better In Boots" is a straight-down-the-middle country love song. Farr plays the role of a guy enjoying a night of fresh air and wild impulses with a girl. There are surprisingly few boot songs in country music, so Farr's new track will immediately stand out as unique." Anthony Easton of Spin highlighted the track as being "the sexiest song about getting literally dirty" and positively compared it to Kip Moore's "Somethin' 'Bout a Truck". In 2017, Billboard contributor Chuck Dauphin put "Better in Boots" at number eight on his top 10 list of Farr's best songs.

== Music video ==
The music video was directed by Eric Welch and premiered in November 2015. It begins with Farr entering a barn, just as a woman in cowboy boots does the same thing. It's followed by Farr and his band performing in said barn with a bunch of women, intercut with scenes of a woman doing archery, a cowboy performing rope tricks on fire, and a silo dance party. The woman is played by former Miss Kansas pageant winner Theresa Vail.

== Chart performance ==
The song has sold 131,000 copies in the United States as of March 2016.

=== Weekly charts ===
Chart (2015–2016)	Peak position
Canada Country (Billboard)	43
US Bubbling Under Hot 100 (Billboard)	25
US Country Airplay (Billboard)	26
US Hot Country Songs (Billboard)	26

=== Year-end charts ===
Chart (2016)	Position
US Hot Country Songs (Billboard)	85
