= Bobby Florsheim =

American screenwriter (born 1969)

Robert Florsheim (born December 19, 1969) is an American screenwriter, best known for co-writing The Passion Of The Ark with Josh Stolberg, (the basis for the film "Evan Almighty"). Their original script was reported by Daily Variety as the highest priced spec script ever sold by unproduced screenwriters (April, 2004). In refashioning the script into "Evan Almighty", Universal Studios discarded the script and then hired screenwriter Steve Oedekerk, who received sole writing credit on the finished film.

He also co-wrote the scripts for Man-Witch (starring Jack Black and directed by Todd Phillips), the book adaptation of The Spellman Files, produced by Laura Ziskin, as well as a remake of Alfred Hitchcock's "To Catch a Thief". In addition, Florsheim has written scripts for Steven Spielberg, Mike Myers, Michael Keaton, Jerry Bruckheimer, John Davis, Bette Midler, and others.

Born in Chicago, to Carol Levy and Jim Florsheim, he attended the Francis W. Parker School. He graduated with honors from Stanford University with a degree in Drama in 1992. In 1995, Florsheim received his Master of Fine Arts from the USC School of Cinema-Television. He lives in Los Angeles. He is married to former Judge Joe Brown reporter Jacque Kessler.
