= A Guy Walks Into a Bar (song) =

Single by Tyler Farr

from the album Suffer in Peace
- Released: August 18, 2014
- Recorded: 2014
- Genre: Country
- Length: 3:16
- Label: Columbia Nashville
- Songwriters: Jonathan Singleton; Melissa Peirce; Brad Tursi
- Producers: Jim Catino; Julian King

Tyler Farr singles chronology
"Whiskey in My Water" (2013)	"A Guy Walks Into a Bar" (2014)	"Withdrawals" (2015)

"A Guy Walks Into a Bar" is a song written by Jonathan Singleton, Melissa Peirce and Brad Tursi, and recorded by American country music artist Tyler Farr. It was released on August 18, 2014, as the lead single to Farr's second studio album Suffer in Peace (2015). It utilizes the bar joke as a setting for a brokenhearted man at a bar. The song received positive reviews from critics who praised Farr's vocal performance over heartfelt lyrics.

"A Guy Walks Into a Bar" gave Farr his first number one country hit on the Billboard Country Airplay chart. Its 42-week climb to number one is considered the fifth longest climb in that chart's 25-year history. The song also reached numbers seven and 51 on both the Hot Country Songs and Hot 100 charts respectively. It was certified Gold by the Recording Industry Association of America (RIAA), denoting sales of over 500,000 units in the country. The song also charted in Canada, reaching number nine on the Country chart and number 67 on the Canadian Hot 100. It received a Gold certification from Music Canada, denoting shipments of over 40,000 units in that country.

An accompanying music video for the song, directed by Jeff Venable, features Farr as a bartender attempting to get the attention of a woman he sees at a bar.

== Content ==
The song uses the bar joke as a setting for a brokenhearted man in a bar. It is in the key of C major with a moderate tempo and a main chord pattern of C-G_{sus}4-F_{sus}2.

== Critical reception ==
Billy Dukes of Taste of Country gave the song a favorable review, saying that "While the lyrics are sharp, it's the singer's delivery that makes this song cook...'A Guy Walks Into a Bar' finds him throwing himself into the emotion of a song like never before." Verity Magazine rated it 4.5 out of 5, calling it "organic and genuine with its heartfelt lyrics", also saying that "Farr's aching voice over the strumming guitar makes it a genuine, heartfelt track that captivates listeners." In 2017, Billboard contributor Chuck Dauphin put "A Guy Walks Into a Bar" at number three on his top 10 list of Farr's best songs.

== Commercial performance ==
"A Guy Walks Into a Bar" became Farr's first number one country hit on the Billboard Country Airplay chart. It reached that position on the week of May 30, 2015, which is its forty-second week on the chart, and the fifth longest climb to number one in the Country Airplay chart's 25-year history. As of 2024, it remains Farr's only number one single. On the Billboard Hot 100, the single debuted at number 97 on the week of January 17, 2015. It peaked at number 51 the week of May 23, and remained on the chart for twenty weeks. The song was certified gold by the Recording Industry Association of America (RIAA) on April 17, 2015. It has sold over 500,000 copies in the US as of June 2015.

On the week of April 18, 2015, the track debuted at number 99 on the Canadian Hot 100 before leaving the next week. It reappeared the week of May 2 at number 87, reached number 67 the week of June 20, and remained on the chart for nine weeks. "A Guy Walks Into a Bar" was certified gold by Music Canada on October 27, 2017.

== Music video ==
Jeff Venable directed the song's music video. The video has Farr playing the role of a bartender who attempts to get the attention of a woman he sees sitting with her friend. He stops a bar brawl from happening but feels sad when he sees the woman chatting with someone he assumes is her boyfriend. While closing up the bar, Farr sees a piece of paper that unfolds into showing a phone number, belonging to the woman who enters the bar waiting for him, and Farr smiles when he turns around to see her.

== Live performance ==
On April 28, 2015, Farr promoted the release of Suffer in Peace by performing the song live on NBC's Today.

== Charts ==
=== Weekly charts ===
Chart (2014–2015)	Peak position
Canada Hot 100 (Billboard)	67
Canada Country (Billboard)	9
US Billboard Hot 100	51
US Country Airplay (Billboard)	1
US Hot Country Songs (Billboard)	7

=== Year-end charts ===
Chart (2015)	Position
US Country Airplay (Billboard)	18
US Hot Country Songs (Billboard)	30

== Certifications ==
Region	Certification	Certified units/sales
Canada (Music Canada)	Gold	40,000^{‡}
United States (RIAA)	Gold	500,000^{‡}
^{‡} Sales+streaming figures based on certification alone.
