= Hello Goodbye (Tyler Farr song) =

Single by Tyler Farr

from the album Redneck Crazy
- Released: August 27, 2012
- Recorded: 2012
- Genre: Country
- Length: 3:41
- Label: Columbia Nashville
- Songwriters: Tyler Farr; Kris Bergsnes; Skip Black
- Producers: Jim Catino; Julian King

Tyler Farr singles chronology
"Hot Mess" (2012)	"Hello Goodbye" (2012)	"Redneck Crazy" (2013)

"Hello Goodbye" is a song recorded by American country music artist Tyler Farr. It was released in August 2012 as the second single from his debut album, Redneck Crazy. Farr wrote the song with Kris Bergsnes and Skip Black. The track garnered similar success as the previous single "Hot Mess", peaking at numbers 47 and 52 on the Billboard Country Airplay and Hot Country Songs charts, respectively. A music video, directed by Darrin Dickerson, was created for the single.

== Critical reception ==
Billy Dukes of Taste of Country gave the song four and a half stars out of five, saying that "While the story is painful (yet satisfying), it's Farr's voice that really surprises. Despite a gruff exterior, he's proving to be a more than capable crooner." In 2017, Billboard placed "Hello Goodbye" at number one on his top 10 list of Farr's best songs.

== Music video ==
The music video was directed by Darrin Dickerson and premiered in October 2012.

== Chart performance ==
Chart (2012)	Peak position
US Country Airplay (Billboard)	47
US Hot Country Songs (Billboard)	52
