= Withdrawals (Tyler Farr song) =

Single by Tyler Farr

from the album Suffer in Peace
- Released: June 15, 2015
- Recorded: 2014–15
- Genre: Country rock
- Length: 3:45
- Label: Columbia Nashville
- Songwriters: Josh Kear; Gordie Sampson; Hillary Lindsey
- Producers: Jim Catino; Julian King

Tyler Farr singles chronology
"A Guy Walks Into a Bar" (2014)	"Withdrawals" (2015)	"Better in Boots" (2015)

"Withdrawals" is a song recorded by American country music artist Tyler Farr. It was released to radio on June 15, 2015 by Columbia Nashville as the second single from his second studio album Suffer in Peace. Written by Josh Kear, Gordie Sampson and Hillary Lindsey, the song is about a man dealing with the fallout of a relationship like an addiction. Despite receiving positive reviews from critics, "Withdrawals" had minor success compared to the previous single "A Guy Walks Into a Bar", peaking at numbers 47 and 52 on the Billboard Hot Country Songs and Country Airplay charts respectively. This was due to the label wanting to withdraw the single from radio and release “Better in Boots” instead, feeling that a more upbeat single would climb the charts quicker and bolster his concert audience. An accompanying music video for the song, directed by Eric Welch, features Farr inside a glass box as he's being submerged into water as it fills up.

== Background and development ==
"Withdrawals" is a break-up song that deals with the fallout of a relationship like an addiction. While compiling the track list for Suffer in Peace, Farr came across the song in his inbox of potential tracks and chose it to be part of the album at the last minute. The demo's production, consisting only of a piano and drum loop, was what fascinated Farr because of its removal from his given genre, and that he wanted to record it into a country song as if done by the Foo Fighters. He also added that his vocal performance on the track adds believability to it and transcends it from a country song into a story.

== Critical reception ==
Billy Dukes of Taste of Country gave the song a positive review, saying that "Tyler Farr won't be offended if you double-check the name on the car stereo when "Withdrawals" gets to the chorus. This massive vocal performance sounds nothing like the more mid-register songs Farr has released from his first two albums. All that stuff about classical training ... yeah, here it is." Jamie Parmenter from Renowned for Sound said that Farr gives the track "an attitude and ease of someone comfortable with himself." In 2017, Billboard contributor Chuck Dauphin put "Withdrawals" at number four on his top 10 list of Farr's best songs.

== Music video ==
The music video was directed by Eric Welch and premiered in June 2015. The video opens with a profile close-up of Farr as the camera goes into his eye and shows Farr inside a glass box as it fills with water. Farr said in an interview that the visual aesthetics were influenced by the industrial band Nine Inch Nails: "When we were trying to come up with visuals to help explain the emotion, we looked at footage of Trent Reznor performances in NIN music videos, art galleries of people in glass boxes, and then tried our best to put those against the lyrics of the song."

== Chart performance ==
The song only reached number 52 on the Country Airplay chart before it was pulled from country radio.

Chart (2015)	Peak position
US Country Airplay (Billboard)	52
US Hot Country Songs (Billboard)	47
