= Whiskey in My Water =

Single by Tyler Farr

from the album Redneck Crazy
- Released: November 4, 2013
- Recorded: 2013
- Genre: Country
- Length: 3:08
- Label: Columbia Nashville
- Songwriters: Tyler Farr; Phillip LaRue; Jon Ozier
- Producers: Jim Catino; Julian King

Tyler Farr singles chronology
"Redneck Crazy" (2013)	"Whiskey in My Water" (2013)	"A Guy Walks Into a Bar" (2014)

Music video
- "Whiskey in My Water" on YouTube

"Whiskey in My Water" is a song recorded by American country music artist Tyler Farr. It was released in November 2013 by Columbia Nashville as the fourth and final single from his debut album Redneck Crazy. Farr wrote the song with Phillip LaRue and Jon Ozier. The song garnered mixed reviews from critics who commended Farr's vocal delivery over lyrics they felt were undistinguished. "Whiskey in My Water" peaked at numbers three and 11 on both the Billboard Country Airplay and Hot Country Songs charts respectively. It also reached number 52 on the Hot 100 chart. The song was certified Platinum by the Recording Industry Association of America (RIAA), denoting sales of over one million units in the country. It achieved similar success in Canada, peaking at number 10 on the Country chart and number 73 on the Canadian Hot 100 chart. The accompanying music video for the song, directed by Chris Hicky, features a couple in various romantic escapades.

== Critical reception ==
The song received a mixed review from Taste of Country, which said that "while he takes chances elsewhere on the project, this ballad plays it safe with a familiar storyline." It went on to say that "while not a true vocal showcase, 'Whiskey in My Water' is an opportunity for Farr to show off his strong vocal abilities." In his review of the album, Matt Bjorke of Roughstock wrote that it has "a sing-a-long ready chorus", but felt it "may be just a little too everyman compared to the rest of the tracks on the record."

== Commercial performance ==
"Whiskey in My Water" debuted at number 58 on the Billboard Country Airplay chart for the week of November 23, 2013. It also debuted at number 46 on the US Billboard Hot Country Songs chart for the week of December 28. On the Hot 100, the song debuted at number 98 the week of April 12, 2014. Twelve weeks later, it peaked at number 52 the week of July 5, and remained on the chart for eighteen weeks. The song has sold 548,000 copies in the US as of July 2014.

In Canada, "Whiskey in My Water" debuted at number 84 on the Canadian Hot 100 chart for the week of June 28, reached number 73 the week of July 26, and stayed on the chart for eight weeks.

== Music video ==
A lyric video for "Whiskey in My Water" premiered on Farr's YouTube channel on the single's release date. The official music video was directed by Chris Hicky and premiered in January 2014. The video follows a couple in various romantic escapades, while Farr is featured singing outside a forest in the fall and a brewery basement drinking some whiskey.

== Charts and certifications ==
=== Weekly charts ===
Chart (2013–2014)	Peak position
Canada (Canadian Hot 100)	73
Canada Country (Billboard)	10
US Billboard Hot 100	52
US Country Airplay (Billboard)	3
US Hot Country Songs (Billboard)	11

=== Year-end charts ===
Chart (2014)	Position
US Country Airplay (Billboard)	9
US Hot Country Songs (Billboard)	30

=== Certifications ===
Region	Certification	Certified units/sales
United States (RIAA)	Platinum	548,000
