= Redneck Crazy (song) =

Single by Tyler Farr

from the album Redneck Crazy
- Released: February 25, 2013
- Recorded: 2013
- Genre: Country rock
- Length: 3:36
- Label: Columbia Nashville
- Songwriters: Josh Kear; Mark Irwin; Chris Tompkins
- Producers: Jim Catino; Julian King

Tyler Farr singles chronology
"Hello Goodbye" (2012)	"Redneck Crazy" (2013)	"Whiskey in My Water" (2013)

"Redneck Crazy" is a song recorded by American country music artist Tyler Farr. Written by Josh Kear, Mark Irwin and Chris Tompkins, it was released in February 2013 as the third single off his debut album, also titled Redneck Crazy, which was released on September 30, 2013. The song is about a man seeing his woman with another man, telling her she broke his heart and made him go 'redneck crazy'. It received mixed reviews from critics put off by the overall message in the lyrics.

"Redneck Crazy" peaked at numbers two and three on both the Billboard Hot Country Songs and Country Airplay charts respectively. It also reached number 29 on the Hot 100 chart, giving Farr his only top 40 hit to date. The song was certified Platinum by the Recording Industry Association of America (RIAA), and has sold 967,000 units as of November 2013. It achieved similar chart success in Canada, reaching number seven on the Canada Country chart and number 57 on the Canadian Hot 100 chart, and garnered a Gold certification from Music Canada.

An accompanying music video for the song, directed by Jeff Venable, features appearances by fellow country artists Lee Brice and Colt Ford, and Willie Robertson from Duck Dynasty.

== Content ==
The male narrator pursues his cheating significant other upon seeing her with another man, telling her that she has "gone and broke the wrong heart, baby / And drove [him] redneck crazy." This song is set in the key of B-flat major with an approximate tempo of 73 beats per minute and a main chord pattern of Gm7-E♭-F.

== Reception ==
=== Critical ===
Billy Dukes of Taste of Country gave the song two and a half stars out of five, writing that "one expects a song with such a name to be a little more fun, but predictable country rock ballad production holds the three-and-a-half minute cut back." Dukes described Farr's performance as "sincere," but added that "he’s let down by an ordinary lyric and unexceptional arrangement." Jon Freeman of Country Weekly praised the song in his review of the album, saying that "it's a bitter, almost scary account of a jilted man stalking his ex and her new guy. It's so messy and human, and it's got a chorus that'll stay with you." Emily Yahr of The Washington Post was critical of the song's message, calling it a "disturbing song" and "glorified stalker anthem". In 2017, Billboard contributor Chuck Dauphin put "Redneck Crazy" at number two on his top 10 list of Farr's best songs.

=== Commercial ===
"Redneck Crazy" debuted at number 59 on the U.S. Billboard Country Airplay chart for the week of February 16, 2013. It also debuted at number 50 on the U.S. Billboard Hot Country Songs chart for the week of March 9, 2013. On the week of June 15, the song debuted on the U.S. Billboard Hot 100 chart at number 95, peaking at number 29 for the week of September 28, and remained on the chart for twenty weeks. The song was certified platinum by the Recording Industry Association of America (RIAA) on October 28, 2013. It has sold 967,000 copies in the US as of November 2013.

In Canada, the song debuted at number 94 on the Canadian Hot 100 chart the week of September 14, reached number 57 the week of October 19, and stayed on the chart for ten weeks. It received a gold certification from Music Canada on February 3, 2014.

== Music video ==
The music video was directed by Jeff Venable and premiered in April 2013. It features Lee Brice, Colt Ford, and Duck Dynasty's Willie Robertson.

== Charts and certifications ==
=== Weekly charts ===
Chart (2013)	Peak position
Canada Hot 100 (Billboard)	57
Canada Country (Billboard)	7
US Billboard Hot 100	29
US Country Airplay (Billboard)	3
US Hot Country Songs (Billboard)	2

=== Year-end charts ===
Chart (2013)	Position
US Country Airplay (Billboard)	7
US Hot Country Songs (Billboard)	15

=== Certifications ===
Region	Certification	Certified units/sales
Canada (Music Canada)	Gold	40,000^{*}
United States (RIAA)	Platinum	1,000,000^{‡} / 967,000
^{*} Sales figures based on certification alone.
