= Fight Like a Girl (Bomshel song) =

Single by Bomshel

from the album Fight Like a Girl
- Released: February 17, 2009
- Recorded: 2009
- Genre: Country, country pop
- Length: 3:31
- Label: Curb
- Songwriters: Kristy Osmunson, Kelley Shepard, Bob Regan
- Producer: Chuck Howard

Bomshel singles chronology
"Cheater, Cheater" (2008)	"Fight Like a Girl" (2009)	"19 and Crazy" (2009)

"Fight Like a Girl" is a song recorded by American country music duo Bomshel. It was released in February 2009 as the second single and title track from their debut album Fight Like a Girl, which was released on October 20, 2009 via Curb Records. Co-written by the duo's two members, Kristy Osmunson and Kelley Shepard, along with Bob Regan.

The song received mixed reviews from critics who found the lyrical content cliché and indifferent to other similar songs. "Fight Like a Girl" peaked at number 30 on the Billboard Hot Country Songs chart. The accompanying music video for the song was directed by Eric Welch and features Bomshel performing with their guitars in front of different backgrounds.

== Content ==
The song is a mid-tempo mostly accompanied by electric guitar. The song's lyrics tell of a young girl who is facing problems in her life, such as being teased on the playground at school. Her mother gives her advice by telling her to "fight like a girl."

== Critical reception ==
Leeann Ward of Country Universe gave the song a C rating, calling the lyrics "potentially cliched." C.M. Wilcox of The 9513, despite saying that "the singing isn't completely unlikeable and neither is the song," gave it a thumbs-down and compared its theme to Brooks & Dunn's "Cowgirls Don't Cry." Bobby Peacock described the song more positively in his review of the album, saying that it had a more commercial sound than the rest of the album, but adding that it was "an appropriate introduction to the rebooted Bomshel."

== Music video ==
The music video was directed by Eric Welch and premiered in May 29, 2009. The video features scenes of the members of Bomshel performing with their guitars in front of different backgrounds with lights and flowers. Throughout the video, the camera moves in and out of focus (from clear to blurry).

The video debuted at number 16 on CMT's Top Twenty Countdown for the week of June 19, 2009.

== Chart performance ==
"Fight Like a Girl" debuted at number 54 on the U.S. Billboard Hot Country Songs chart dated February 28, 2009. It entered the Top 40 on the chart dated May 16, 2009, and went on to peak at number 30 in August 2009, giving Bomshel their first Top 40 and 30 country hit.

Chart (2009)	Peak position
US Hot Country Songs (Billboard)	30
