= Hot Mess (Tyler Farr song) =

Single by Tyler Farr

from the album Redneck Crazy
- Released: February 6, 2012
- Recorded: 2012
- Genre: Country
- Length: 3:16
- Label: BNA
- Songwriters: Dallas Davidson; Rhett Akins; Ben Hayslip
- Producers: Jim Catino; Julian King

Tyler Farr singles chronology
"Hot Mess" (2012)	"Hello Goodbye" (2012)

"Hot Mess" is a debut song recorded by American country music artist Tyler Farr. It was released in February 2012 as the first single from his debut album, Redneck Crazy. It was written by Dallas Davidson, Rhett Akins and Ben Hayslip. The song peaked at number 49 on the Billboard Hot Country Songs chart.

== Critical reception ==
Billy Dukes of Taste of Country gave the song four stars out of five, saying that "Perhaps the generic production could be a point of criticism, but for a debut single it’s best to keep it short and sweet" In 2017, Billboard contributor Chuck Dauphin placed "Hot Mess" at number seven on his top 10 list of Farr's best songs.

== Chart performance ==
Chart (2012)	Peak position
US Hot Country Songs (Billboard)	49
