= Mark Irwin (songwriter) =

American country music songwriter

- Born: The Bronx, New York
- Origin: Nashville, Tennessee
- Genres: Country
- Occupation: Songwriter
- Years active: 1989–present

Mark Irwin is an American country music songwriter.

In 1990, he co-wrote Alan Jackson's "Here in the Real World", which was twice nominated for Song of the Year by the Country Music Association. He also wrote "Till I Was Loved by You" by Chely Wright, "If the Jukebox Took Teardrops" by Danni Leigh, and "19 and Crazy" by Bomshel. In 2013, he co-wrote Tim McGraw and Taylor Swift's "Highway Don't Care", which reached number 1, and Tyler Farr's "Redneck Crazy".
