= Melissa Pierce =

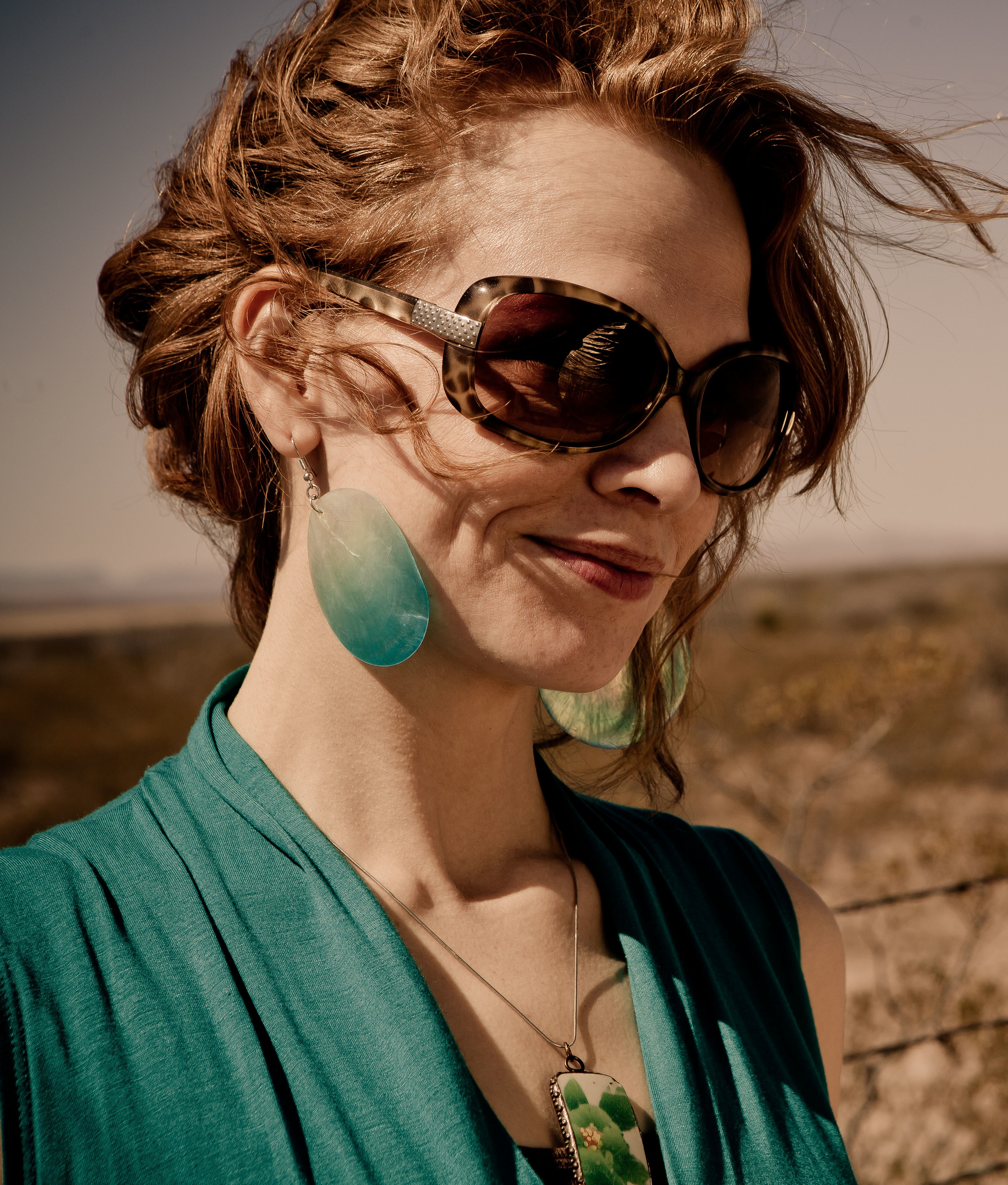
- Pierce during RVSX 2011
- Citizenship: United States
- Occupations: Entrepreneur, Filmmaker
- Spouse: Cole Pierce
- Website: melissapierce.com

Melissa Pierce is an American entrepreneur and documentary filmmaker. As of 2012, she is the Chief Operating Officer of the technofashion startup Everpurse. She previously filmed the documentary Life in Perpetual Beta, and runs technology and leadership events. She is based in Chicago, Illinois.

== Life and work ==
Pierce was working as a life coach in 2008 when she began filming Life in Perpetual Beta, a documentary about the changing nature of life and passion in a technological era. The creation process was shared online, and all aspects of the film were crowdsourced: whom to interview, what to ask, how to put together a crew and how to pay for production. She was a frequent speaker about using social media to learn and collaborate directly with an audience.

She went on to organize further collaborative media projects online, capturing the process of creation. In 2011, she founded #RVSX, an annual mobile art project involving filmmakers and writers taking an RV road-trip to SXSW, and capturing regional events as they travel. In 2013, Pierce was interviewed as part of the CNN LIVE EVENT/SPECIAL, South by Southwest Festival Profiled.

Pierce built communities in Chicago around learning to program and to launch companies. In 2012 she started the Pitch Refinery conference, as a way to help new women entrepreneurs practice framing and pitching new ideas. She also founded the Chicago Women Developers group, one of the largest such groups in the country.

In December 2012, she joined Everpurse, a fashion startup integrating inductive chargers into daily accessories. They launched their line of purses with a Kickstarter project.

Pierce is currently producing a documentary about Grace Hopper, "Born with Curiosity - The Grace Hopper Story."

=== Life in Perpetual Beta ===
Life in Perpetual Beta was a 2010 documentary film about how technology affects individuals and society, by enabling people to live less planned lives. It captured the lives of 60 technologists, designers, and creative artists, including Jeffrey Zeldman, Baratunde Thurston, Juliette Powell, Seth Godin, Biz Stone, Brian Solis, Xuanlana Nguygen, Carin Goldberg, Jeff Pulver, Gary Vaynerchuk, Liz Danzico, Jason Fried, Tatiana DeMaria, Nova Spivack, Carlos Segura, Kevin Lyman and Dan Pink.

Production began in 2008. Pierce turned to crowd funding to finance the film. Post production was paid for via a Kickstarter grant.

The film was self-distributed, and received a positive reception at the Los Angeles Cinema Film Festival and other festivals around the US.

=== Born with Curiosity - The Grace Hopper Story ===
Born with Curiosity - The Grace Hopper Story is a documentary film about Grace Hopper, a US mathematics professor who determinedly joins the US Navy during World War II and contributes immensely to the beginnings of modern computing. It was set to be released in 2016 but after an unsuccessful IndieGoGo campaign (According to the project's IndieGoGo page), release was pushed back to 2018 and additional sponsors were sought. It seems that the project may have stalled as this film has yet to be released.
