= Catfight (video game) =

1996 video game

- Developer: Phantom Card
- Publisher: Atlantean Interactive Games
- Producer: Gary Rothman
- Platform: Windows
- Release: 1996
- Genre: Fighting
- Modes: Single-player, multiplayer

Catfight (also known as Cat Fight and CatFight: The Ultimate Female Fighting Game) is a fighting video game developed by American studio Phantom Card and published in 1996 by Atlantean Interactive for Microsoft Windows. It received negative reviews from critics.

== Plot ==
The plot of Catfight revolves around a dark goddess Shinma and 10 female warriors competing to challenge her and obtain the ultimate power. The game's advertisement on Atlantean Interactive's website states:

"Join eleven of the fiercest female warriors from across the Ethers [sic] as they battle it out for the ultimate power of the Universe! Watch the head-to-head fighting assault blaze its way to your screen -- with the hottest women in games engaging in the most violent fighting techniques imaginable! Some of the things you must endure are disembowelment, decapitation, and worse! It's the ultimate life versus death struggle, where you must pulverize your opponent in eight awesome arenas to survive! Here is your chance to claim your place next to the most awesome women in the galaxy!"

== Development ==
Like the early games in the Mortal Kombat series, Catfight uses digitized actors for creating the sprites representing the fighters. Martial arts actress Katalin Zamiar of Mortal Kombat II fame portrayed a female ninja character Chae Lee.

== Reception ==
GameRankings rated the game at only 8.67%, their score based on three magazine reviews (Computer Games Magazine rated the game 0/5). Ron Dulin scored it a 1.6/10 in GameSpot, calling it "without a doubt, the worst computer game ever released". He added: "The worst thing about Catfight (and, believe me, that's a hefty accomplishment) is that the gameplay is just so damn bad. I'll sleep easier knowing there will never be a Catfight 2." The Daily Pennsylvanian called Catfight the "number one sexist game ever created". A reviewer for Next Generation panned the game for "the poor image quality, ... nonexistent play control, ridiculously inane special effects, and abysmal sound." He scored it one out of five stars, remarking, "Our scoring system won't let us give zeroes, so Atlantean owes us one star."

In 2010, PC Gamer ranked Catfight as the seventh worst game of all time, describing it as "so bad, being caught masturbating to it would actually be less embarrassing than being caught playing it." It was also included among the worst games of all time by Digital Spy in 2012 and by GamesRadar in 2014.
