= Dogfight (disambiguation) =

A dogfight is a type of close quarters aerial battle between fighter aircraft.

Dogfight may also refer to:

== Film and television ==
- Dogfight (film), 1991, set in 1960s San Francisco
- Dogfights (TV series), featuring military air combat re-enactments
- "Dog Fight" (Suits), a 2011 television episode

== Games ==
- Dogfight (1980 computer game), for the Apple II
- SGI Dogfight, a 1985 game for SGI workstations
- Dogfight (1993 computer game), for DOS, Atari and Amiga
- Dogfights: The Game, a 2007 PC game based on the TV series
- Dogfighter (2010 computer game), for Windows

== Toys ==
- Dogfight (G.I. Joe), a fictional character
- Dogfight (Transformers) a fictional character
- Dog Fighter, a series of radio-controlled cars by Yokomo
  - Yokomo YZ-834B, the first of a series of cars also named "Dog Fighter"

== Other uses ==
- Dogfight (musical), based on the 1991 film
- "Dogfight" (short story), by Michael Swanwick and William Gibson
- "DOGFIGHT", a song by M.o.v.e
- Dog fighting, a blood sport in which dogs are trained to attack each other
- Play fighting among dogs as a natural part of Dog behaviour
- "Dogfight!" an episode in the manga series Initial D
- "Dog Fight", a dubstep track by the artist Virtual Riot
