= Evan Almighty =

2007 film by Tom Shadyac

- Theatrical release poster
- Directed by: Tom Shadyac
- Screenplay by: Steve Oedekerk
- Story by: Steve Oedekerk; Joel Cohen; Alec Sokolow
- Based on: Characters by Steve Koren; Mark O'Keefe
- Produced by: Tom Shadyac; Gary Barber; Roger Birnbaum; Neal H. Moritz; Michael Bostick
- Starring: Steve Carell; Morgan Freeman; Lauren Graham; John Goodman; John Michael Higgins; Jimmy Bennett; Wanda Sykes
- Cinematography: Ian Baker
- Edited by: Scott Hill
- Music by: John Debney
- Production companies: Universal Pictures; Spyglass Entertainment; Relativity Media; Shady Acres Entertainment; Original Film
- Distributed by: Universal Pictures
- Release dates: June 10, 2007 (Universal CityWalk); June 22, 2007 (United States)
- Running time: 96 minutes
- Country: United States
- Language: English
- Budget: $175 million
- Box office: $174 million

Evan Almighty is a 2007 American fantasy comedy film directed by Tom Shadyac and written by Steve Oedekerk, who co-wrote the story with Joel Cohen and Alec Sokolow. A spin-off and sequel to Bruce Almighty (2003), it stars Steve Carell and Morgan Freeman reprising their roles of Evan Baxter and God, respectively, alongside Lauren Graham, John Goodman, John Michael Higgins, Jimmy Bennett, and Wanda Sykes. The film is a modern-day retelling of Noah's Ark, which Evan reluctantly re-enacts on God's behalf while he also pursues a new career in government.

Production of the film began in January 2006. Several visual effects companies were used to provide CGI for the numerous animals and the climactic tsunami scene. By the time the film had completed production, it had become the most expensive comedy film ever, which would later be overtaken by Men in Black 3.

Evan Almighty premiered at Universal CityWalk on June 10, 2007, and was theatrically released in the United States on June 22 by Universal Pictures. Unlike its predecessor, it received negative reviews from critics and was not commercially successful, grossing $174 million worldwide.

== Plot ==
Newly elected to Congress, former television news reporter Evan Baxter leaves his hometown of Buffalo, New York and moves to Prestige Crest, located in the fictional town of Huntsville, Virginia, where his congressional campaign declares that he will change the world. Evan prays to God to give him this opportunity. His wife, Joan, also prays that she, Evan, and their three sons will be closer together as a family.

On his first day in Congress, Evan introduces himself to his staffers and then given the opportunity to join his greedy boss, Congressman Chuck Long, to co-sponsor his Citizens' Integration of Public Lands Act (CINPLAN) bill. Over the next few days, strange events occur in Evan's life:

- Eight vacant lots in Prestige Crest are purchased under his name.
- Ancient tools and gopher wood are delivered to his house that he did not order.
- A man claiming to be God suddenly appears wherever he goes, causing him to faint during the Pledge of Allegiance.
- Pairs of animals start following him around everywhere he goes, with birds breaching into his office through the window and two sheep appear on the backseat of his Hummer.
- His hair and beard grow uncontrollably regardless of how many times he shaves.
- The number 614 starts appearing in various forms throughout his daily routines.

Evan realizes the number actually refers to verse 14 in chapter 6 of the Book of Genesis, where God instructed Noah to build an ark in preparation for a coming flood. God appears to Evan and asks him to build an ark because a flood is coming. Though initially hesitating, Evan starts building the ark on the vacant lots by using the tools and materials provided, giving him an opportunity to spend more time with his sons, but Joan sees this as a midlife crisis.

While Evan still maintains his career in Congress, his changing appearance alienates his staffers because of God and the animals who often stalk him become more disturbing. God provides Evan an ancient robe and warns him that the flood will come by mid-day on the 22nd of September. This forces Long to fire Evan from Congress after he tries to explain his mission and warns the other congressmen about the impending flood. Joan falsely believes that Evan has gone insane and takes her sons to live with her mother in Canada, leaving Evan himself to continue building the ark alone. Meanwhile, God disguises himself as a waiter at the restaurant, where he tells Joan that she should see this as an opportunity for the entire family to be closer. Joan understands God's meaning and decides to return to Evan to help him finish building the ark together to prepare for the flood.

On September 22, Evan's three staffers uncover evidence that Long has turned Prestige Crest over to private investors by damming off a lake, but he had cut corners during the dam's construction. They suspect Long would do the same with his Public Lands Act bill. With the ark finally complete, the animals board two by two and the police threaten to demolish the ark with a wrecking ball as it violates land codes in Prestige Crest. When only a small amount of rain falls, Evan realizes that the flood will be the result of Long's dam failing. When the dam actually fails, the entire community manages to board the ark and all the houses of Prestige Crest are destroyed. The ark then rides the floodwaters into Washington, D.C. by travelling through the National Mall until it reaches its final destination in front of the Capitol, which interrupts the vote for Long's Public Lands Act bill. Evan confronts Long on his accountability for the cost-cutting that lead up to the dam's failure, inciting the other congressmen to turn against him.

The voting for the Public Lands Act bill is suspended due to an investigation of Long's profiteering behavior. Evan is reinstated to Congress and all the animals return to their natural habitats. With his appearance returned back to normal, Evan re-encounters God during a family hike. God states that Evan had successfully changed his world by growing closer to his family because the key to changing the world is a single Act of Random Kindness (ARK). During the film's closing credits, God issues a new commandment to the outgoing audience: "Thou shalt do the dance", which is followed by the film's cast and crew members dancing to the C+C Music Factory song "Gonna Make You Sweat (Everybody Dance Now)".

== Cast ==
- Steve Carell as Evan Baxter
- Morgan Freeman as God
- Lauren Graham as Joan Baxter, Evan's wife
- Johnny Simmons as Dylan Baxter, Evan's eldest son
- Graham Phillips as Jordan Baxter, Evan middle son
- Jimmy Bennett as Ryan Baxter, Evan's youngest son
- Wanda Sykes as Rita Daniels, Evan's executive assistant
- John Michael Higgins as Marty Stringer, Evan's chief of staff
- Jonah Hill as Eugene Tannenbaum, one of Evan's three staffers
- John Goodman as Congressman Chuck Long, Evan's greedy boss
- Molly Shannon as Eve Adams, Evan's real estate agent
- Ed Helms as Ed Carson the Ark Reporter
- Rachael Harris as Ark Reporter
- Brian Howe as Builder
- Harve Presnell as Congressman Burrows
- Madison Mason as Congressman Dodd, one of Long's co-sponsors for his Public Lands Act bill
- Bruce Gray as Congressman Hughes, one of Long's co-sponsors for his Public Lands Act bill
- Paul Collins as Congressman Stamp
- Jim Doughan as Male Neighbor
- Meagen Fay as Female Neighbor
- Dean Norris as Officer Collins
- Maile Flanagan as Mail Carrier
- Lisa Arch and Simon Helberg as staffers
- David Barrera as Ark Reporter
- Ruth Williamson as Neighbor
- Michael Roper as Congressional Reporter
- Emily Eby as Animal Wrangler
- Jon Stewart has a cameo appearance as Himself
- Catherine Bell as Susan Ortega, Evan's co-anchor of Eyewitness News from the original Bruce Almighty (uncredited)
- Bart the Bear 2 and Honey Bump as bears

== Production ==
=== Screenplay ===
The film's screenplay was originally titled The Passion of the Ark and was written by Bobby Florsheim and Josh Stolberg. It became the subject of a seven-studio bidding war in April 2004. The script was sold to Sony Pictures in a deal worth $2.5 million plus a percentage of the profits, a record for a spec script from previously unproduced writers. Universal Studios immediately made a deal to co-produce the script with Sony Pictures and have Steve Oedekerk rewrite it into the sequel to Bruce Almighty. Oedekerk had been involved with Bruce Almighty as an executive producer and co-writer of the screenplay (with Steve Koren and Mark O'Keefe, who wrote the story). The studio later discarded the original The Passion of the Ark script completely, and Oedekerk fashioned a new script from scratch (only he received final credit on the finished film as screenwriter). Jim Carrey was asked to reprise his role as Bruce in the sequel, and when he declined, director Tom Shadyac convinced Steve Carell to accept the leading role. Shadyac, reflecting on the first film, stated "[Carell] delivered some of the funniest stuff in the movie. We thought, 'Why not take that character and spin him off into a different film?'"

Unlike the first film, Bruce Almighty (2003), Buena Vista Pictures Distribution (through their Buena Vista International label) was not involved in financing, co-producing and as an international distributor for the sequel.

=== Casting ===
Jim Carrey declined to reprise his role from the original Bruce Almighty and has said that he is "not a big fan of doing the same character twice." This marked the third time a sequel has been made to a film for which Carrey declined to reprise his role, the others being Dumb and Dumberer: When Harry Met Lloyd and Son of the Mask.

=== Budget ===
The initial budget, at approximately $140 million, led Evan Almighty to become the most expensive comedy film ever made. Added costs such as set construction, visual effects, and problems with filming multiple animals in a controlled location brought the budget up to $175 million. Once marketing for the film was also included, the film's entire spend was estimated to be around $200 million. The ballooning budget caused Sony to drop the project and hand it over entirely to Universal Studios. Part of the budget was Carell's payroll, where he earned a reported $5 million for his leading role. The Virginia Film Office estimates the film brought $20–25 million to Virginia, with the majority of it in the Charlottesville area. Universal defended the cost of the film, saying it was "designed as a four-quadrant film, and therefore poised for bigger [box office] returns than typical comedies."

=== Ark design and construction ===
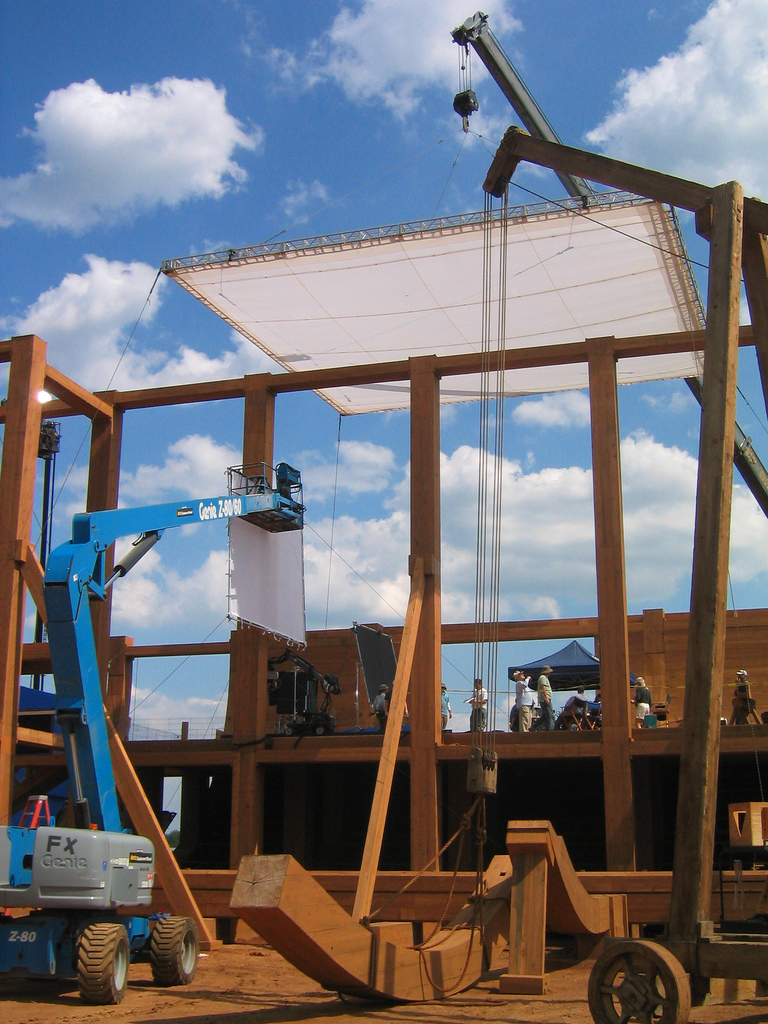
The ark being prepared for filming a scene

Construction of the ark began in January 2006 and the scenes involving the ark were shot in a Crozet, Virginia, subdivision called Old Trail. The ark was designed to meet the actual measurements of the biblical ark, measuring 450 feet (137 m) long, 80 feet (24 m) wide, and 51 feet (16 m) high. The ark's layout was also based on pictures in several children's books that crew members had read in their childhoods. When the characters were filmed during the day building the ark or were on location elsewhere, crew members would further construct the ark at night. A concrete base was built to support the weight of the large ark; after filming was completed, the ark was taken down in a week, and the base in another week.

In disassembling the set, everything that was salvageable from the ark was donated to Habitat for Humanity. "Leave no trace" was the slogan used by the director as a part of one of the DVD's bonus features, "The Almighty Green Set".

=== Costumes and filming locations ===
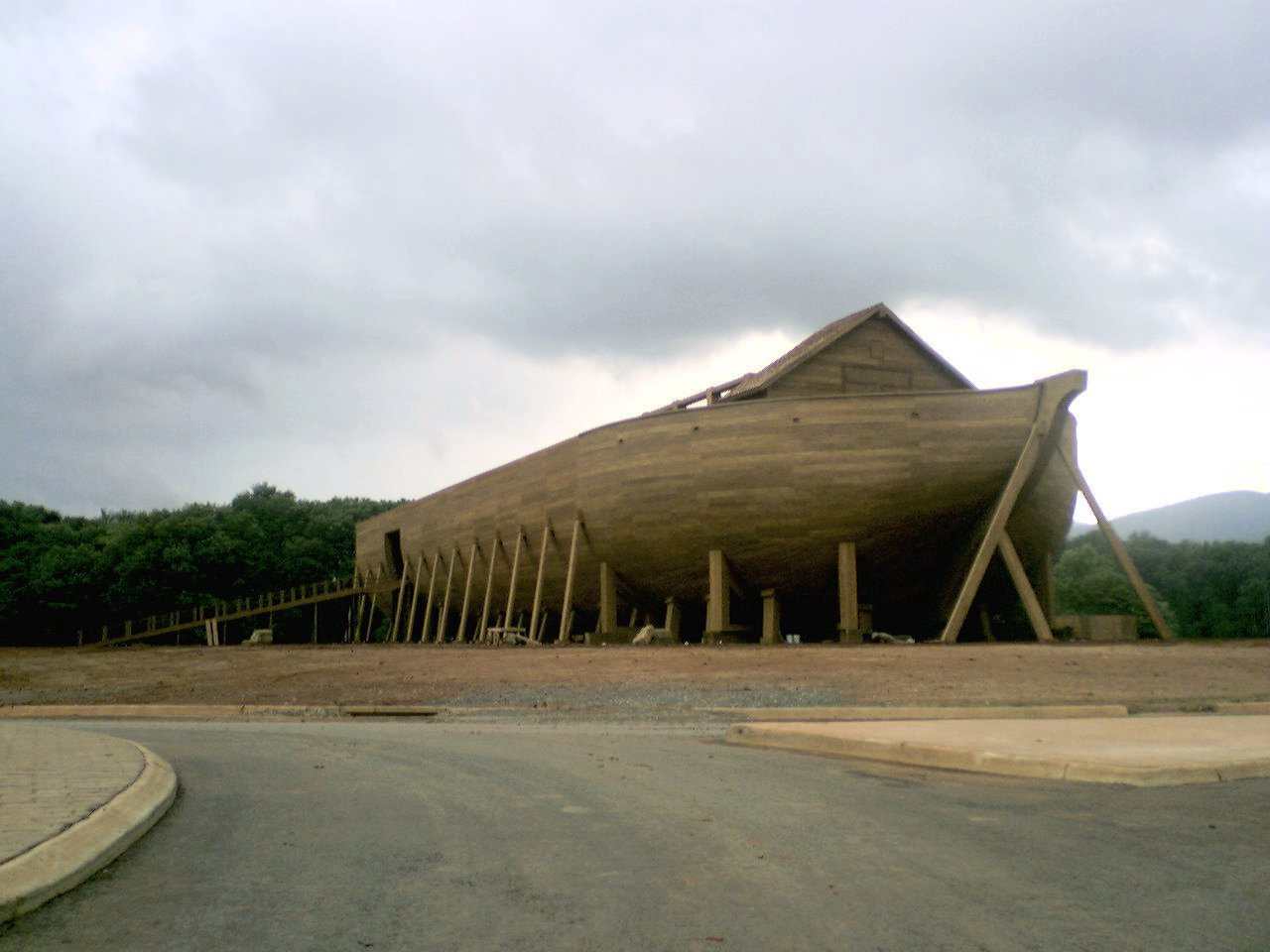
The Ark used for filming was located in Crozet, Virginia.

To create Evan's beard and long hair, three designers would take three hours each day adding individual hairs using prosthetic adhesive and making Carell wear custom wigs. The wigs consisted of both human and yak hair. With his new look, Carell was sometimes nicknamed "Mountain Man", "Retrosexual", or "Unabomber." For his costumes, designers spoke with textile experts, researched historical information on the clothing that was likely worn at the time of Noah, and used aged fibers for the clothing.

Scenes for the film were filmed in various locations in Virginia, including areas in and around Crozet, Madison, Waynesboro, Richmond, Charlottesville, and Staunton, though some filming did take place at Universal Studios in Hollywood, California.

=== Visual effects ===
For the CGI used throughout the film, companies Industrial Light & Magic (ILM) and Rhythm & Hues Studios (R&H) developed different parts of the film. R&H focused on the animation of the animals, while ILM completed the final scene of the ark rushing through Washington, D.C. Lindy De Quattro, the ILM associate visual effects supervisor, revealed that "This is the first time where we had to do a whole series of shots that were happening mid-day, where you were going to get a really long look at the water and what it was doing." The company initially experienced problems creating the water effects and had to develop new tools that would choreograph the movements of the water. In addition, ILM used similar tools that were used on their prior film Poseidon. Lighting was also an issue as the characters on the ark had been filmed on a greenscreen stage, and the visual effects company had to ensure that the lighting matched that of the characters and the outside setting. Details were added to the ark for long-distance shots to make the design of the ark more appealing and relate the ark's size to scale in comparison to the amount of water. To complete the scene, ILM used thirty to sixty crew members and produced 200 shots over a yearlong period between April 2006 and May 2007.

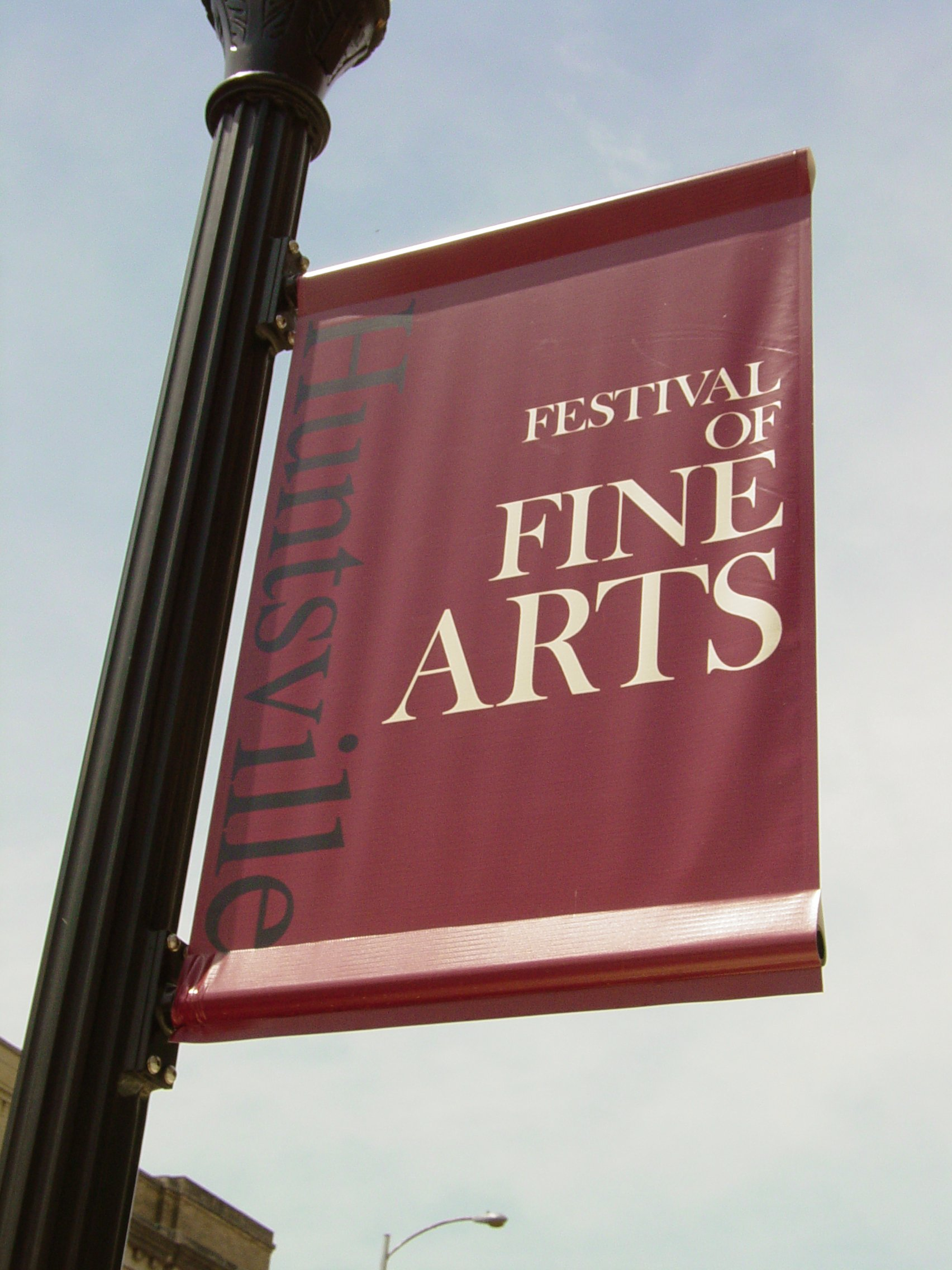
Signage on a lamppost in downtown Waynesboro, Virginia, for Evan Almighty filming

Rhythm & Hues created 300 pairs of animals for use on the ark and fifteen pairs with higher detail for closeup shots. R&H was also assisted by C.I.S. Hollywood, another visual effects company, who provided a large number of composites, involving hundreds of greenscreen animal elements. In scenes where there are multiple species of animals, crew members would film the animals on the greenscreen and R&H and C.I.S would digitally add the animals one at a time, sometimes taking several weeks to a couple of months. Andy Arnett, the animation supervisor, declared that "The research was extensive. It took six or seven months to perfect the look and feel of the animals before we had the first shot out the door."

For the scene in Congressman Long's office, CGI was used the entire time for the fish that follow Evan around from the fish tank. Cafe FX, the visual effects company hired for the scene, ordered ten different kinds of tropical fish from a local store and studied their movements to imitate them on screen using computer animation. Jeff Goldman, the visual effects supervisor, stated "Early in the sequence, we mimicked the actual behavior of the fish in our animation, but as the scene plays out, the fish are a counterpoint to Steve Carell's comedic timing."

== Marketing ==
In late May, during production, the media learned that director Tom Shadyac angrily complained to producers, saying "I'm not seeing any ads, and I don't know why. I'm not getting answers. People are giving me information that isn't true ... I'm only hearing about all the other summer movies, and nothing about mine." Shadyac also fired his marketing consultants that he had used for prior films due to his thoughts over the mishandling of the marketing. He later apologized for his outburst with producers, and claimed that it was as a result of his nervousness before the film's release.

Grace Hill Media, a marketing firm that targets religious Americans and was also used for marketing Bruce Almighty, The Da Vinci Code, and The Passion of the Christ; held exclusive screenings of the film in mid-June in fifty cities in the United States to reach religious moviegoers. Grace Hill provided free screenings to blogs in exchange for publicity on the blogs. The film and its subsequent home video release was marketed to Christians and their churches through a "kindness campaign" called Ark ALMIGHTY.

The first trailer of the film premiered on March 29, 2007, during a marathon of The Office, which also stars Steve Carell and Ed Helms. For online advertising, an eight-minute clip of a scene was released on Yahoo! two days before the release of the film.

The film was also an official sponsor for the 2007 Tooth & Nail Tour along with Best Buy, PureVolume, AbsolutePunk and White Castle.

== Environmental impact ==
Director Tom Shadyac felt the film reflected environmental themes of how humans are stewards of God's creation. In keeping with the themes, Evan Almighty became NBC Universal's first film to offset the production's carbon emissions. Producer Michael Bostick revealed how the emissions were offset:

We worked closely with The Conservation Fund to calculate our carbon emissions from what we used on the movie—whether from vehicles used or any of the construction equipment. Once our carbon emissions were calculated, we planted trees that will effectively zero out our climate-changing footprint left behind from the movie.

Shadyac accomplished this by requiring crew members to plant 2,050 trees at the Rappahannock River Valley National Wildlife Refuge in Warsaw, Virginia and the San Joaquin River National Wildlife Refuge near Modesto, California. He also bought over 400 bikes for all the cast and crew, to get to work instead of driving. In addition, rather than simply demolishing sets, Shadyac tried to donate houses built for the production and had the Ark set recycled, by donating materials to Habitat for Humanity. During the premiere of the film for cast and crew at Universal Citywalk, the attendees were encouraged to donate to a campaign to plant trees in forests around the world. The after party used recycled cups and plates to offset the use of resources. Shadyac also required that when Industrial Light & Magic developed the climactic scene, that the CGI flood did not appear to harm any of the trees in the scene.

The film partnered with the website Get On Board Now, which focused on the importance of conservation during production of the film. Donations were taken at the website for The Conservation Fund, which paid for the planting of 15,000 trees.

== Animal welfare ==
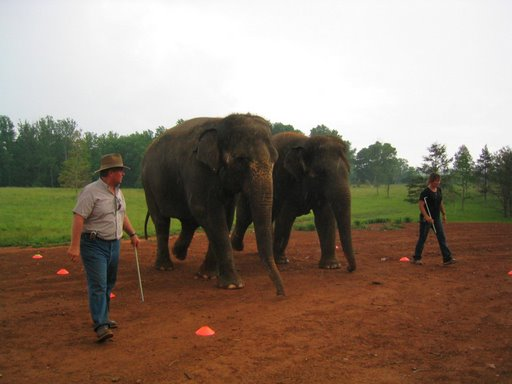
Two elephants being trained for filming

The American Humane Association oversaw the 177 species of animals that were used in the film. In scenes including both predators and prey, the animals were digitally added instead to ensure their safety. The American Humane Association gave its permission for the film to display "No animals were harmed in the making of this movie" over the closing credits.

PETA accused the film's producers of using animals that had previously been abused. Two chimpanzees who appear in the film, Cody and Sable, were surrendered by their owner to settle a lawsuit that documented allegations of beatings and mistreatment. PETA was also critical of Birds & Animals Unlimited, the primary animal supplier to the film, for alleged serious and continuing violations of the U.S. Animal Welfare Act, including failure to comply with veterinary care requirements and failure to provide shelter from heat and sunlight, which PETA details and claims it can document.

The film's director, Tom Shadyac, said of PETA's criticisms "many of these animals have been rescued from other situations and can't be returned to the wild" and "There's a certain amount of hypocrisy whenever you work with animals, even to show, which we hope we're showing, that respect of all of God's creation ... I don't know. I respect their criticism." A Universal Studios spokesperson declared:

The live animals used in the filming of Evan Almighty were supplemented by a great number of computer-generated animals, but it would have been impossible to depend on CGI exclusively as some key scenes in the film demonstrate the need for peaceful and productive co-existence between man and animals. One of the most prominent, inescapable messages of the film is the responsibility that humans have to protect and care for animals.

== Release ==
=== Theatrical ===
The premiere for the film was held on June 10, 2007, and guests included Adam Sandler, David Hasselhoff, Kate Flannery, Eddie Murphy, Kevin James, and Mindy Kaling, among others.

=== Home media ===
Evan Almighty was released on HD DVD and DVD on October 9, 2007, by Universal Studios Home Entertainment, and was the fourth-most rented DVD of the week earning $6.4 million. In the film's first six weeks of release, it earned $27,676,676 in domestic DVD sales. The HD DVD and DVD's special features include deleted scenes, outtakes, cast interviews, and footage of the animals that were used in the film. The film was later released on Blu-ray on August 7, 2012.

=== Proposed ban in Malaysia ===
Malaysia's Muslim Consumers Association (PPIM) called for a ban on the film, claiming it is offensive to Islam. Secretary-General Maamor Osman claimed that the film was depicting the great flood as comedy and characterized God with the portrayal of a human, both of which are considered blasphemous in Islam. Similarly there was some public protest against Bruce Almighty being shown in theaters, but that film was released on DVD and was also shown on television broadcasts. Evan Almighty was still released in Malaysia on August 23, 2007.

== Reception ==
=== Box office ===
Though Evan Almighty was well-hyped, especially with churchgoers, and had double the budget of Bruce Almighty, it performed under expectations. On its first weekend, it opened in 5,200 screens in 3,604 theaters and earned $31.1 million (on its first two days the film earned $11.4 million followed by $8.3 million on Sunday). The opening was less than half of the first film's $68 million weekend ($85 million counting Memorial Day). Nikki Rocco, the president of distribution for Universal Pictures declared, "We never expected it to be much higher ... it is not unusual for family films to open at a level like this and build. This film will have legs." The film managed to remain at the third spot at the box office in its second week, before dropping to fifth place in its third week.

Internationally, the film also opened in first place in Russia and Ukraine, earning $1.5 million in Russia with 329 venues and $179,000 in Ukraine at 64 locations. The gross in the opening weekends for the two countries was 10% and 11%, respectively, bigger than the opening for Bruce Almighty. Altogether, the film earned $173,418,781 worldwide with $100,462,298 in the U.S. and $72,956,483 in the international box office.

=== Critical response ===
On the review aggregator website Rotten Tomatoes, 25% of 195 critics' reviews are positive, with an average rating of 4.5/10. The website's consensus reads: "Big on special effects but short on laughs, Evan Almighty underutilizes a star-studded cast that includes Steve Carell and Morgan Freeman." Metacritic, which uses a weighted average, assigned the film a score of 37 out of 100, based on 33 critics, indicating "generally unfavorable" reviews. Audiences polled by CinemaScore gave the film an average grade of "A−" on an A+ to F scale.

Critic Richard Roeper commended Jim Carrey for declining to reprise his role in "three of the worst sequels of all time", which included Dumb and Dumberer: When Harry Met Lloyd, Son of the Mask and Evan Almighty. He continued: "Evan Almighty is a paper-thin alleged comedy with a laugh drought of biblical proportions, and a condescendingly simplistic spiritual message." Several reviewers credit Carell's performance to significantly improving the humor of the film. Peter Travers of Rolling Stone gave it 1 out of 4, calling it "shamelessly juvenile, pseudo-religious, mock-sincere" and "not that funny". He praised Carell "who projects the movie’s only sense of mischief. But it’s too little and too late." He later included it on his list of the Worst Movies of 2007.

=== Accolades ===
Before Evan Almighty was released, it was nominated for "Best Summer Movie You Haven't Seen Yet" at the 2007 MTV Movie Awards. Competing against seven other nominees, it lost to Transformers. At the Golden Raspberry Awards Evan Almighty was nominated for the Worst Prequel or Sequel, but lost to Daddy Day Camp.

Year	Ceremony	Category	Recipients	Result
2007	Teen Choice Awards	Choice Movie Actor – Comedy	Steve Carell	Nominated
2007	Teen Choice Awards	Choice Hissy Fit	Steve Carell	Nominated
2007	Teen Choice Awards	Choice Scream	Steve Carell	Nominated
2008	Golden Raspberry Awards	Worst Prequel or Sequel		Nominated

== Soundtrack ==
Evan Almighty: Music from and Inspired by the Motion Picture

Soundtrack album by Various Artists
- Released: July 3, 2007
- Genres: Country, rock, CCM, dance
- Label: Curb
- Producers: Adam Anders, Matt Bronleewe, D.J. Butcher, Mike Curb, Chuck Howard, Dann Huff, Doug Johnson, Hal Ketchum, Jo Dee Messina, Kathy Nelson, Eric Pittarelli, Tom Shadyac

Singles from Evan Almighty
- 1. "Ready for a Miracle" Released: 2007

Professional ratings
Review scores
Source	Rating
AllMusic	2/5 stars

Evan Almighty: Music from and Inspired by the Motion Picture debuted in 2007. The soundtrack debuted on June 19, 2007. "Revolution" was performed by Rascal Flatts in the film. Their version is not on the soundtrack, but it appears as a bonus track on their album Still Feels Good. Also not included on the soundtrack are Elton John's 2006 hit, "Just Like Noah's Ark" of which only a little bit is heard during the start of building the ark, and John Mayer's "Waiting on the World to Change", used in the main ark-building montage. "Ready For a Miracle" was released as a single for the soundtrack by American country pop recording artist, LeAnn Rimes.

Rascal Flatts' version of "Revolution" peaked at number 57 on the Hot Country Songs charts, and "The Power of One" by Bomshel reached number 52 on the same.

The soundtrack was nominated for a Dove Award for Special Event Album of the Year at the 39th GMA Dove Awards. The song "Be the Miracle" by Room for Two was also nominated for Contemporary Recorded Song of the Year while "Ready for a Miracle" by LeAnn Rimes won the Dove Award for Traditional Gospel Recorded Song of the Year.

No.	Title	Recording artist(s)	Length
1.	"Ready for a Miracle"	LeAnn Rimes	3:36
2.	"One Love"	Jo Dee Messina	3:53
3.	"Have You Ever Seen the Rain?"	John Fogerty	2:47
4.	"Walk on Water"	Blue County	3:50
5.	"Spirit in the Sky" (with Mikeschair)	Plumb	3:24
6.	"The Power of One"	Bomshel	4:33
7.	"Be the Miracle"	Room for Two	2:17
8.	"God Makes Stars"	Hal Ketchum	3:03
9.	"This Land Is Your Land"	The Mike Curb Congregation	3:16
10.	"Never Give Up"	Tracy Edmond	4:00
11.	"Revolution"	Blue County	4:17
12.	"Revolution"	Stone Temple Pilots	3:39
13.	"Sharp Dressed Man"	Jo Dee Messina	3:49
14.	"Sharp Dressed Man"	ZZ Top	4:15
15.	"Gonna Make You Sweat (Everybody Dance Now)"	C+C Music Factory	4:07
16.	"Have You Ever Seen The Rain?"	Creedence Clearwater Revival	2:41

- Note: Tracks one, two and fourteen to sixteen are taken from the film, while tracks three through thirteen are inspired by the film.
