= 19 and Crazy =

Single by Bomshel

from the album Fight Like a Girl
- Released: September 28, 2009
- Genre: Country
- Length: 3:55
- Label: Curb
- Songwriters: Mark Irwin; Josh Kear; Kristy Osmunson; Kelley Shepard
- Producers: Mark Irwin, Josh Kear, Kristy Osmunson

Bomshel singles chronology
"Fight Like a Girl" (2009)	"19 and Crazy" (2009)	"Just Fine" (2010)

"19 and Crazy" is a song recorded by American country music duo Bomshel. It was released in September 2009 as the third single from their debut album Fight Like a Girl. Kelley Shepard and Kristy Osmunson, who comprise Bomshel, co-wrote the song with Mark Irwin and Josh Kear. Osmunson, Kear, and Irwin also produced the track.

== Content ==
"19 and Crazy" is an up-tempo country song that centralizes on its female narrator, who states a desire to retain the lifestyles of her late teenage years.

== Critical reception ==
Kevin J. Coyne of Country Universe gave the song a B rating. He stated that "the song has an incessant driving beat that straddles the fence between urgency and just plain annoyingly fast". Bobby Peacock of Roughstock gave a positive review, saying that it was similar in theme to Mark Wills' "19 Somethin'" but adding, "it's tempered by a sense of maturity by the opening stanza, where she realizes she[...]might tell her children not to do all of the crazy things that she did."

== Music video ==
The video was directed by Eric Welch, and features the duo on their touring.

== Chart performance ==
"19 and Crazy" debuted at number 55 on the U.S. Billboard Hot Country Songs chart dated October 3, 2009. On the chart dated November 7, 2009, it became Bomshel's second consecutive Top 40 country hit. It peaked at number 33 in December 2009.

Chart (2009)	Peak position
US Hot Country Songs (Billboard)	33
