= Tootsie's Orchid Lounge =

Honky-tonk bar on Lower Broadway in Nashville, Tennessee

Coordinates: 36.1608°N 86.77823°W

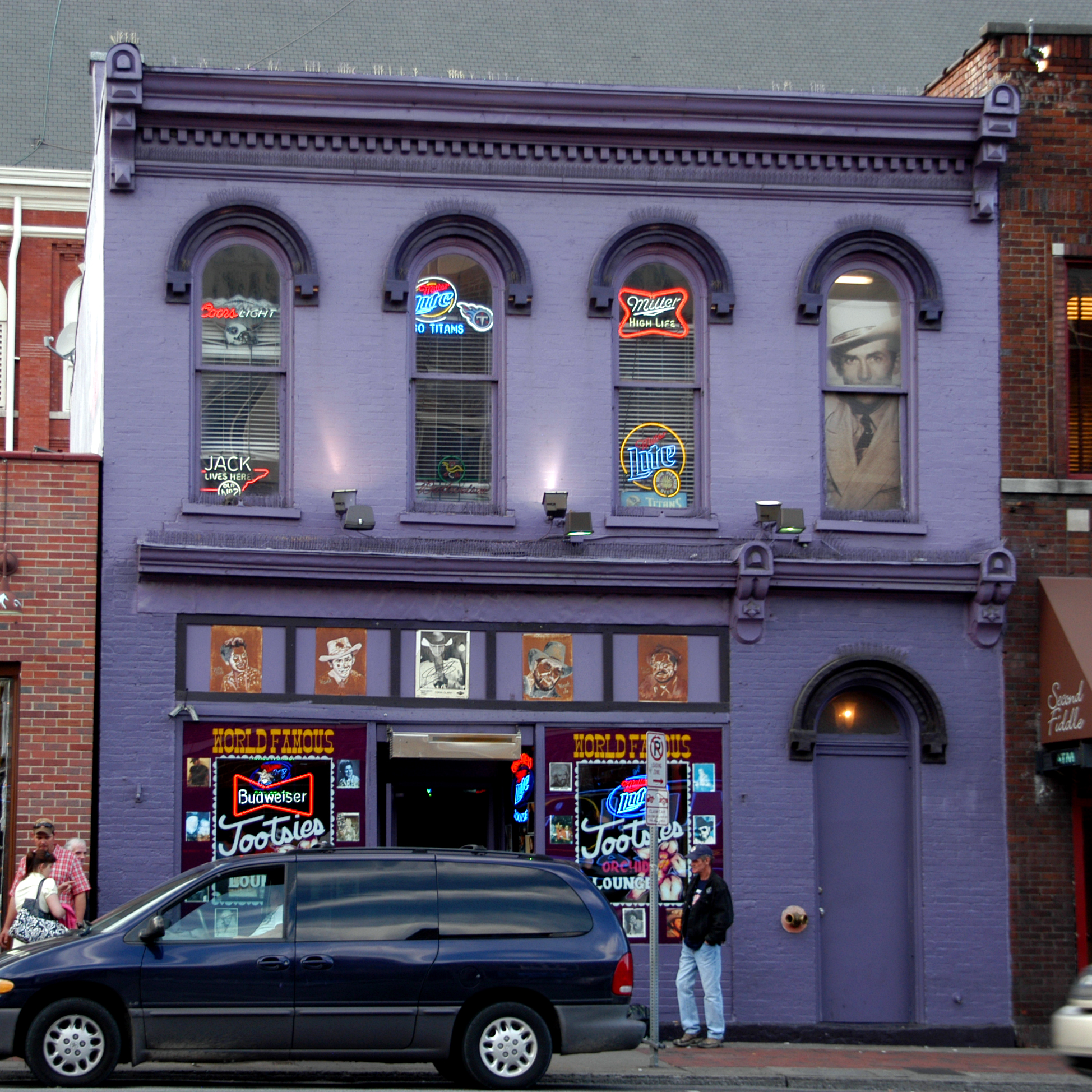
Tootsies Orchid Lounge

Tootsie's Orchid Lounge is a honky-tonk bar in Nashville, Tennessee, US. It is located behind the Ryman Auditorium, home in past years and occasionally in the present to the stage and radio show The Grand Ole Opry. Tootsie's has three stages that host live local talent each night, covering modern-day country music artists such as Jason Aldean, Taylor Swift, and other performers, as well as original work.

== History ==
Some of its early famous first customers were Willie Nelson, Patsy Cline, Mel Tillis, Kris Kristofferson, Waylon Jennings, Roger Miller and numerous other country musicians. According to the bar's website, Nelson received his first songwriting gig after singing at Tootsie's. Terri Clark, a Canadian-born country artist, started singing at Tootsie's in 1987, and has since become an internationally-known country star with hits such as "Better Things to Do," and the Warren Zevon cover, "Poor Poor Pitiful Me."

Originally named Mom's, Hattie Louise "Tootsie" Bess bought the future honky-tonk in 1960. The name came later when, to her surprise, a painter made the exterior of the lounge purple. Subsequently, the name was changed to Tootsie's Orchid Lounge and, to date, the exterior of the building still is painted the same color. At her 1978 funeral were Nashville luminaries Tom T. Hall, Roy Acuff and Faron Young. She was buried in an orchid gown, with an orchid placed in the orchid-colored casket, so she could take her favorite flower to heaven. Legendary Opry artist Connie Smith, by then emphasizing Southern gospel music, sang some of Tootsie's favorite hymns at the funeral.

Despite the move of the Opry out of the Ryman in 1974 to the newly-built Grand Ole Opry House several miles to the east of downtown, Tootsie's survived, usually surrounded by disreputable businesses such as adult entertainment and pawn shops, and continued to be a center for traditional 1950s and 1960s-style country performances and a gathering place for songwriters and others in the business. It stayed around long enough to witness a renaissance, beginning in the 1990s, of the music and tourist scene along Broadway and of the Ryman itself, which began hosting some Opry shows again after an extensive renovation. These brought new customers to Tootsie's. Customers still come to enjoy great food, and although it is no longer on the regular menu, customers can still order the “Tootsies Tail” lobster plate that was a favorite of country star Loretta Lynn.

On November 7, 2010, Tootsie's celebrated its 50th anniversary with performances at the Ryman Auditorium from Kris Kristofferson, Terri Clark, Little Jimmy Dickens, Mel Tillis, Jamey Johnson, and Joanna Smith.

== Wall of Fame ==
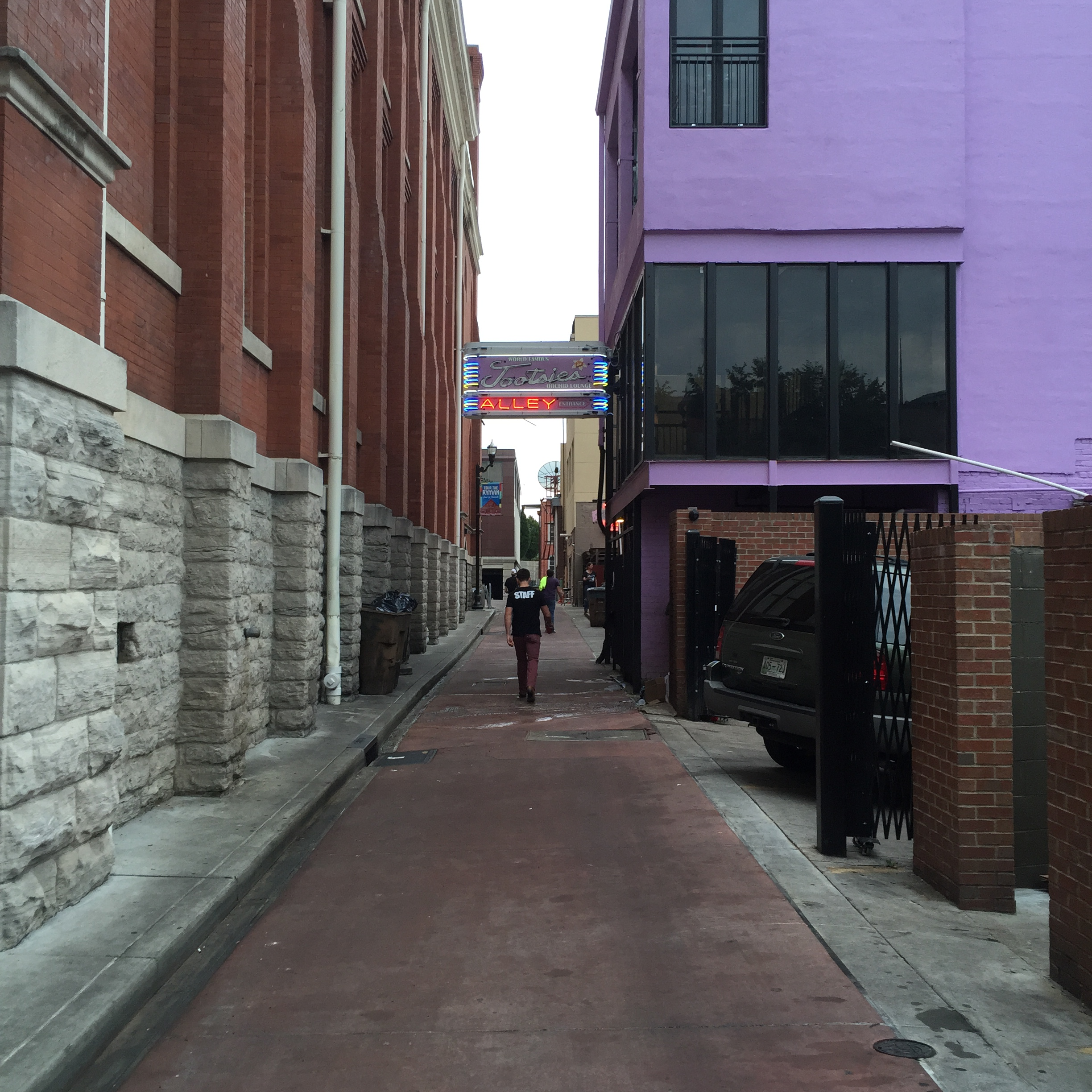
Alley between the rear entrance of Tootsie's and Ryman Auditorium.

Plastered throughout the venue are photos and memorabilia of past and present individuals that have influenced country music. There are many pictures of country music artists, publicity stills of the greats, the hopefuls, and failures who came to Music City chasing dreams. Some of the pictures include the likes of Hank Williams Sr., Patsy Cline, and Willie Nelson.

== Documentary ==
Tootsie's Orchid Lounge: Where the Music Began was released as a 60-minute documentary in July 1995 and re-released in 2005. Willie Nelson gives insight, with interviews of Jimmy Dean and Jim Reeves, into Tootsie's early days as a favored spot for some of the biggest names in country music, who would stop in to meet their friends, enjoy a drink, and swap a few songs. The documentary includes archived footage of Patsy Cline, songwriter Harlan Howard, Roger Miller and performances by Dolly Parton, Aaron Neville, Marijohn Wilkin as well as newer and veteran country artists Trisha Yearwood, Billy Ray Cyrus, Marty Stuart, Tanya Tucker, Ray Price, and Bobby Bare.

== Trivia ==
Whitney Rose's 2026 song "Tootsies" is in reference to the bar and particularly its Wall of Fame.
