= Cheater, Cheater =

Single by Joey + Rory

from the album The Life of a Song
- Released: September 17, 2008
- Genre: Country, bluegrass
- Length: 2:59
- Label: Sugar Hill / Vanguard
- Songwriters: Rory Feek; Joey Feek; Kristy Osmunson; Wynn Varble
- Producer: Carl Jackson

Joey + Rory singles chronology
| "Cheater, Cheater" (2008) | "Play the Song" (2009) |

"Cheater, Cheater" is the debut single from American country/bluegrass duo Joey + Rory, from their debut album, The Life of a Song. The song debuted on the Hot Country Songs chart at #57 for the chart week of September 27, 2008. Co-written by both Joey and Rory, the song was originally recorded by country duo Bomshel, whose version failed to chart after its release as a single.

== Content ==
"Cheater, Cheater" is an up-tempo song with bluegrass influences, including accompaniment from Dobro, mandolin and fiddle. The female narrator, in the lyric, asks her unfaithful partner where he met "that no-good, white-trash ho" (i.e., his mistress). Several remixes have been made for the song, including the Sleighbell Mix and King Mix. The Sleighbell Mix was released as a Christmas promo single, in which the word ho becomes ho-ho-ho and bells are added to the music. The song was available on iTunes as the "Free Single of the Week" from October 14–21, 2008.

== Critical reception ==
Reviews of "Cheater, Cheater" have been positive. Roughstock.com said that "'Cheater, Cheater' is an honest-to-God pure country song that jumps out of the speakers. With lyrics that find Joey as the woman who's been cheated on… [i]t’s three minutes of tempo and while it remains to be seen whether radio will embrace this truly country duo, songs like 'Cheater, Cheater"'are what makes country music what it is: honest, true to life music."

Engine 145 critic Matt C. gave the song a "thumbs up" rating. He called it a "delightfully acoustic barn-burner" and said "it’s arresting to hear what nearly qualifies as a bluegrass song performed by a strait-laced contemporary country singer", although he criticized Joey's "oddly phrased and somewhat colorless" lead vocals and Rory's "barely audible" backing vocals.

== Music video ==
A music video directed by Peter Zavadil was released to accompany the song. In the video, Joey is seen following Rory around, confronting him over cheating on her. Mixed in are scenes of the duo performing the song together in happy moods. The video ends with a cameo from Naomi Judd playing the "ho".

== Chart performance ==
The Joey + Rory version of "Cheater, Cheater" debuted at #57 on the U.S. Billboard Hot Country Songs chart for the chart week of September 27, 2008, and entered the Top 40 in its eighth week. The song peaked at #30 in January 2009, spending 20 weeks on the chart. The song has sold 367,000 copies in the US as of March 2016.

| Chart (2008–09) | Peak position |
|---|---|
| US Hot Country Songs (Billboard) | 30 |
| US Billboard Bubbling Under Hot 100 | 23 |
