= Chris Hicky =

American video director

Chris Hicky is a writer/director from Forrest City, Arkansas, United States, best known for directing many of Keith Urban's music videos. Hicky has also directed videos for many other artists in the country music genre, including Dierks Bentley, Maddie & Tae, Kellie Pickler, Deana Carter, Thomas Rhett, Carrie Underwood, Hunter Hayes, Kelsea Ballerini, Lady Antebellum, Cassadee Pope, Faith Hill, Danielle Bradbery, Florida Georgia Line, and Miranda Lambert. He has won awards including the 2010 ACM Video of the Year award, the 2010 CMT Female Video of the Year award, and the 2005 CMT Video of the Year award. His Grammy nomination came in 2010 for Keith Urban's Love, Pain, and the Whole Crazy World live concert DVD.

Hicky's first feature film, The Grace of Jake, was shot entirely on location in his hometown of Forrest City. Its cast include Jordin Sparks, Jake La Botz, Lew Temple, Roy Lee Jones, and Ravi Kapoor, and Michael Beck. Based on Hicky's own script, the film was funded through the crowdfunding platform Kickstarter.

Other projects directed by Hicky include commercials, short films, and a television pilot, House in the Hills. His short film Blue Horses played at festivals including CineVegas and the Oxford Film Festival.
