= Album Number Two =

Studio album by Joey + Rory
- Released: September 14, 2010
- Recorded: 2009–2010
- Genres: Country, bluegrass
- Length: 40:32
- Label: Vanguard/Sugar Hill
- Producers: Carl Jackson (tracks 1—11); Keith Stegall (track 12)

Joey + Rory chronology
The Life of a Song (2008)	Album Number Two (2010)	A Farmhouse Christmas (2011)

Singles from Album Number Two
- 1. "This Song's for You" Released: July 20, 2010; 2. "That's Important to Me" Released: October 2010

Professional ratings
Review scores
Source	Rating
Yahoo	Positive
Country Universe	4/5 stars
The 9513	4/5 stars

Album Number Two is the second studio album from country music duo Joey + Rory. The album was released to the public on September 14, 2010, via Vanguard Records and Sugar Hill Records. Its lead single, "This Song's for You," was released to country radio on July 20, 2010. However, the single failed to enter the Hot Country Songs chart. The album's second single "That's Important to Me" was released to country radio in October 2010, and debuted at number 58 on the chart week ending February 12, 2011.

== Track listing ==
1. "Album Number Two" (Rory Lee Feek, Don Poythress, Wynn Varble) – 2:57
2. "That's Important to Me" (R.L. Feek, Tim Johnson, Joey Feek) – 3:22
3. "All You Need Is Me" (R.L. Feek) – 2:53
4. "Born to Be Your Woman" (R.L. Feek, J. Feek, Heidi Feek) – 3:17
5. "Baby I'll Come Back to You" (R.L. Feek, Matt Rossi, David Banning) – 2:53
6. "God Help My Man" (R.L. Feek, Jamie Teachenor, Paul Overstreet) – 3:23
7. "The Horse Nobody Could Ride" (R.L. Feek, Banning) – 2:54
8. "Farm to Fame" (R.L. Feek, Jim Collins) – 3:21
9. "Where Jesus Is" (Poythress, LeAnn Hart, Donnie Skaggs) – 4:06
10. "You Ain't Right" (Phil O'Donnell, Kelley Lovelace, Tim Owens) – 3:33
11. "My Ol' Man" (R.L. Feek, Luke Bryan) – 3:53
12. "This Song's for You" (R.L. Feek, Zac Brown) – 3:56
  - featuring Zac Brown Band

== Personnel ==
- Bryan Allen – photography
- Jeff Balding – mixing
- Kathy Best – publicity
- Zac Brown – lead vocals on "This Song's for You"
- John Caldwell – engineer
- Jason Campbell – production coordination
- Clay Cook – steel guitar, background vocals, and Hammond B-3 organ on "This Song's for You"
- Tony Creasman – drums
- Heidi Feek – background vocals
- Joey Feek – vocals
- Rory Feek – acoustic guitar, vocals
- Shannon Forrest – drums
- Kevin "Swine" Grantt – bass guitar
- Aubrey Haynie – fiddle
- John Driskell Hopkins – backing vocals on "This Song's for You"
- Rob Ickes – dobro
- Carl Jackson – acoustic guitar, banjo, mandolin, producer, background vocals
- Mike Johnson – acoustic guitar, steel guitar
- Tristan Brock Jones – assistant
- John Kelton – mixing
- Jason Lehning – engineer
- Paul Leim – drums
- Matt Maher – management
- Kyle Manner – assistant engineer
- Jimmy de Martini – fiddle on "This Song's for You"
- Catherine Marx – synthesizer, piano
- Brent Mason – electric guitar
- Michael Powers – promoter
- Garrett Rittenberry – design
- Matt Rovey – engineer
- Doug Sax – mastering
- Billy Sherrill – engineer
- Jimmie Lee Sloas – bass guitar
- Jennie Smythe – marketing
- Adam Steffey – mandolin
- Keith Stegall – producer
- Bryan Sutton – acoustic guitar, electric guitar
- Ilya Toshinsky – acoustic guitar
- Barry Waldrep – mandolin
- Hank Williams – mastering
- Jay Williams – booking
- Luke Wooten – mixing

== Chart performance ==
Album

Album Number Two debuted at number 60 on the U.S. Billboard 200, as well as number 9 on the U.S. Billboard Top Country Albums and number 11 on U.S. Billboard Independent Albums charts, with sales of 6,986 in the first week. As of October 16, 2010, the album has sold 14,244 copies in the U.S.

Chart (2010)	Peak position
US Billboard 200	60
US Billboard Independent Albums	11
US Billboard Top Country Albums	9

Singles

Year	Single	Peak positions
Year	Single	US Country
2010	"This Song's for You" (with Zac Brown Band)	—
2010	"That's Important to Me"	51
"—" denotes releases that did not chart
