= Rockin' You Tonight =

Studio album by Blaine Larsen
- Released: June 13, 2006
- Genre: Country
- Label: BNA, Giantslayer
- Producer: Rory Lee Feek and Tim Johnson

Blaine Larsen chronology
Off to Join the World (2005)	Rockin' You Tonight (2006)

Singles from Rockin' You Tonight
- 1. "I Don't Know What She Said" Released: 2006; 2. "Spoken Like a Man" Released: 2006

Professional ratings
Review scores
Source	Rating
Allmusic	4/5 stars

Rockin' You Tonight is the second studio album by American country music artist Blaine Larsen. Released in 2006 on BNA Records (in association with Giantslayer Records), the album produced two singles for Larsen on the Hot Country Songs charts: "I Don't Know What She Said" and "Spoken Like a Man", which respectively reached number 24 and number 42. Also included is a cover of Mac Davis's "Baby, Don't Get Hooked on Me", as well as "I'm in Love with a Married Woman", which was previously recorded and released as a single by Mark Chesnutt from his 2002 self-titled album. "Let Alone You" was later recorded by Easton Corbin on his eponymous debut album in 2010.

== Track listing ==
No.	Title	Writer(s)	Length
1.	"I Don't Know What She Said"	Cory Batten, Kent Blazy, Lane Turner	3:45
2.	"Let Alone You"	Sonny Tillis, Carson Chamberlain, Gary Harrison	3:17
3.	"Rockin' You Tonight"	Tim Johnson, Blaine Larsen	3:33
4.	"Baby, Don't Get Hooked on Me"	Mac Davis	3:41
5.	"No Woman"	Johnson, Larsen	2:31
6.	"They Don't Grow Enough Roses"	Johnson, Clint Daniels	3:08
7.	"I'm in Love with a Married Woman"	Johnson, Marc Beeson	3:26
8.	"Spoken Like a Man"	Ed Hill, Josh Kear, David Frasier	2:48
9.	"Lips of a Bottle" (duet with Gretchen Wilson)	David Bleam, Johnson, Larsen	4:02
10.	"Someone Is Me"	Joe Doyle, Kear	3:35
11.	"I Don't Wanna Work That Hard"	Brandon Kinney, Monty Criswell	2:35
12.	"At the Gate"	Rory Feek, Johnson, Larsen	3:31

== Personnel ==
- Eddie Bayers - drums, percussion
- Spady Brannan - bass guitar
- Perry Coleman - background vocals
- Mickey Jack Cones - background vocals
- J.T. Corenflos - baritone guitar, electric guitar
- Stuart Duncan - fiddle, mandolin
- Kevin "Swine" Grantt - bass guitar
- Tommy Harden - drums, percussion
- Blaine Larsen - lead vocals
- Chris Leuzinger - baritone guitar, electric guitar
- Bill McDermott - electric guitar
- Brent Mason - electric guitar
- Jimmy Nichols - accordion, Hammond organ, piano, synthesizer horns, Wurlitzer
- Danny Parks - electric guitar
- Biff Watson - acoustic guitar, nylon string guitar, hi-string guitar
- Gretchen Wilson - duet vocals on "Lips of a Bottle"
- Lonnie Wilson - drums, percussion
- Glenn Worf - bass guitar

== Chart performance ==
=== Album ===
Chart (2006)	Peak position
U.S. Billboard Top Country Albums	23
U.S. Billboard 200	93
