= A Farmhouse Christmas =

Studio album by Joey + Rory
- Released: October 11, 2011
- Genre: Country
- Length: 39:44
- Label: Vanguard/Sugar Hill
- Producers: Gary Paczosa; Carl Jackson

Joey + Rory chronology
Album Number Two (2010)	A Farmhouse Christmas (2011)	His and Hers (2012)

Professional ratings
Review scores
Source	Rating
Allmusic	3.5/5 stars

A Farmhouse Christmas is the lone Christmas album by American country music duo Joey + Rory. It was released on October 11, 2011 via Vanguard Records and Sugar Hill Records. The album contains twelve tracks, ten of which are either new or not traditionally associated with Christmas. It includes the standards "Away in a Manger" and "Blue Christmas," as well as a cover of Merle Haggard's "If We Make It Through December" featuring background vocals from Haggard.

== Track listing ==
No.	Title	Writer(s)	Length
1.	"It's Christmas Time"	Rory Lee Feek	3:37
2.	"The Gift"	Stephanie Davis	4:18
3.	"If We Make It Through December"	Merle Haggard	3:28
4.	"Remember Me"	R.L. Feek, Tim Johnson	3:19
5.	"I Know What Santa's Getting for Christmas"	Garth Brooks, Kent Blazy	2:24
6.	"What the Hell (It's the Holidays)"	Frank Rogers, Wynn Varble	4:17
7.	"Blue Christmas"	Billy Hayes, Jay W. Johnson	3:13
8.	"Come Sit on Santa Claus' Lap"	Shawn Camp, Brice Long	2:09
9.	"The Diamond O"	Davis	2:53
10.	"Away in a Manger"	Traditional	3:02
11.	"Let It Snow (Somewhere Else)"	R.L. Feek, Joey Feek, James T. Slater, Johnson	3:18
12.	"Another Wonderful Christmas"	R.L. Feek, J Feek, Slater, Johnson	3:46

== Chart performance ==
Chart (2011)	Peak position
U.S. Billboard Top Country Albums	59
U.S. Billboard Top Holiday Albums	24
