= Giantslayer Records =

American record label

- Founded: 2004
- Founder: Rory Lee Feek; Tim Johnson
- Defunct: 2009
- Status: Defunct
- Genre: Country
- Country of origin: United States
- Location: Nashville, Tennessee

Giantslayer Records was an American independent record label specializing in country music. It was established in 2004 by songwriters Rory Lee Feek and Tim Johnson in Nashville, Tennessee. The label is known for releasing the debut album of Blaine Larsen, as well as charting the Christmas single "Bring Him Home Santa", credited to Song Trust.

== History ==
Songwriters included Rory Lee Feek born in Atchison, Kansas. Feek has co-written Blake Shelton's Number One single "Some Beach", as well as Top 5 hits for Clay Walker ("The Chain of Love") and Collin Raye ("Someone You Used to Know"). He and Joey Martin founded the duo Joey + Rory in 2008. Tim Johnson, cofounder, grew up in western Oregon. He has written more than one hundred country music songs for other artists, including hits for George Strait, Mark Chesnutt, Tracy Byrd, Diamond Rio, and Alan Jackson. Other writers added later to the list included Helen Darling, Blaine Larsen, Mandy McCauley (MixMasterMandy), Paul Sikes and Jamie Teachenor.

The label's first release was Blaine Larsen's 2004 album In My High School, which was re-issued in 2005 as Off to Join the World on BNA Records in association with Giantslayer.

In December 2007, Giantslayer and Capitol Records released a Christmas song entitled "Bring Him Home Santa". Written by Feek and Johnson, the song was sung by an anonymous six-year-old girl and credited to the Song Trust. On the Billboard Hot Country Songs chart dated for the week of January 5, 2008, "Bring Him Home Santa" reached a peak of number 29. Song Trust released an album, The Dog Singer, on June 16, 2009. The album's first single, "Choose Me," was released to country radio in July 2009.

The company folded after Rory Lee Feek got more involved in the husband and wife duo project Joey + Rory

== See also ==
- Joey + Rory
- Rory Lee Feek
