= List of Top Country Albums number ones of 2016 =

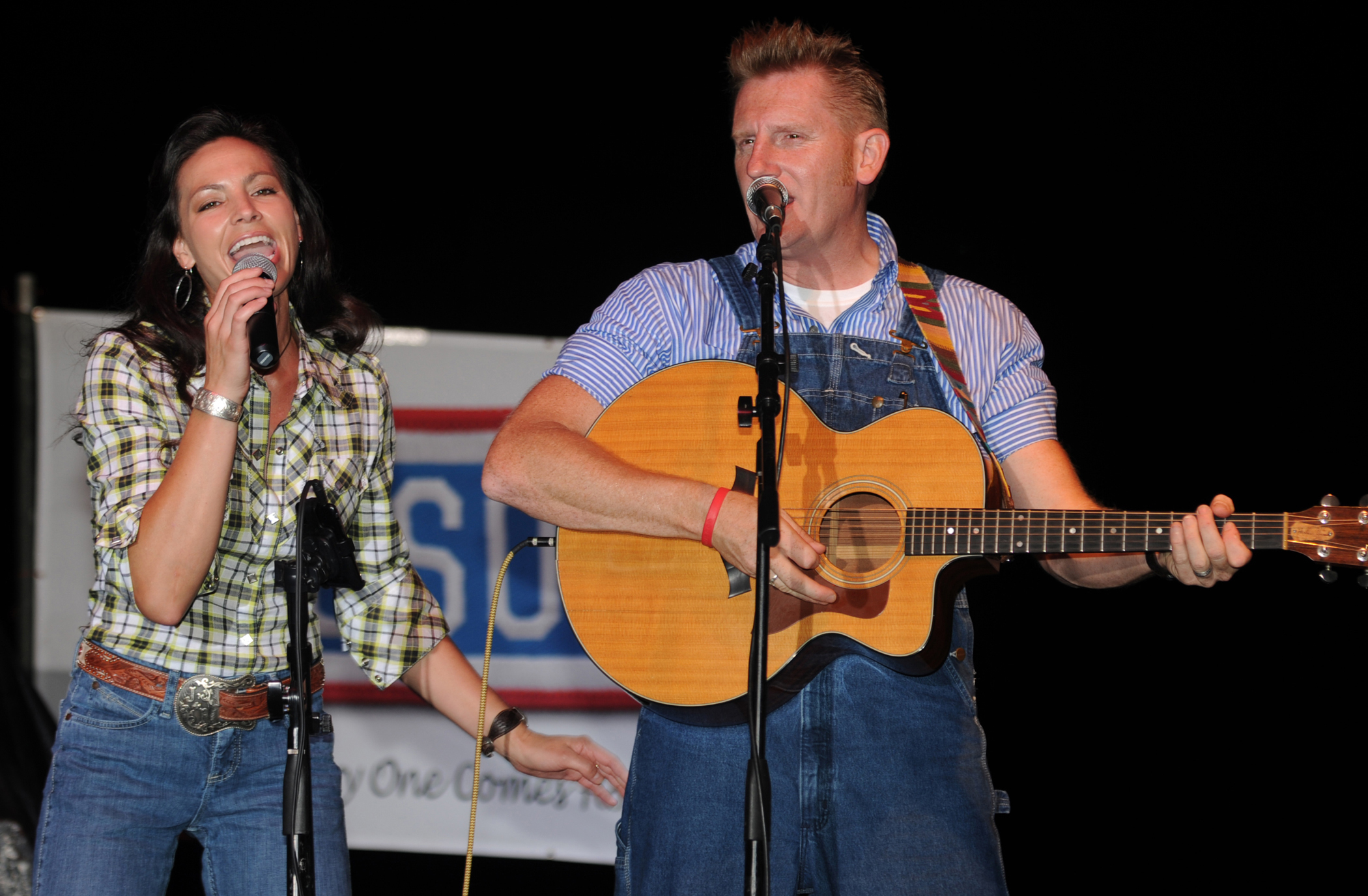
Hymns That Are Important to Us by Joey + Rory reached number one in the issue of Billboard dated March 5, 2016. Joey Feek (left) died on March 4.

Top Country Albums is a chart that ranks the top-performing country music albums in the United States, published by Billboard. In 2016, 22 different albums topped the chart; placings were based on electronic point of sale data from retail outlets.

In the issue of Billboard dated January 2, Chris Stapleton was at number one with Traveller, its fifth week in the top spot. The album held the top spot for the first nine weeks of 2016 and made intermittent returns to the top spot for the remainder of the year, spending a total of 20 weeks atop the chart during the twelve months. No other act spent more than four weeks at number one in 2016. Traveller's first run of the year in the top spot was ended by Joey + Rory's first chart-topping album Hymns That Are Important to Us, which reached number one in the issue of Billboard dated March 5; Joey Feek, the female half of the husband-and-wife duo, died on March 4 at the age of 40.

Several other acts topped the chart for the first time in 2016, beginning with Sturgill Simpson, who spent a single week at number one in May with A Sailor's Guide to Earth, which would go on to win the award for Best Country Album. Maren Morris and Kane Brown both topped the chart with their respective debut albums Hero and Kane Brown, as did Steven Tyler, who released his first solo album We're All Somebody from Somewhere after more than 40 years as the lead singer of the hard rock band Aerosmith and took it to the top of the country albums listing. Jon Pardi also reached number one for the first time. Garth Brooks was the only artist to top the chart with two different albums during the year, both of which reached the top spot in December. He spent a single week at number one in the issue of Billboard dated December 3 with Christmas Together, a collaboration with his wife Trisha Yearwood, and four weeks later returned to the top of the chart with the compilation album The Ultimate Collection. One album reached number one on both the Top Country Albums chart and the all-genre Billboard 200 in 2016: Jason Aldean held the top spot on both listings in the issue of Billboard dated October 1 with They Don't Know.

== Chart history ==
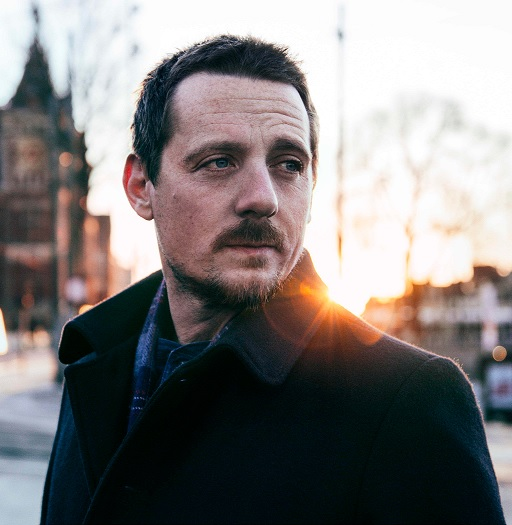
Sturgill Simpson topped the chart for the first time with A Sailor's Guide to Earth.

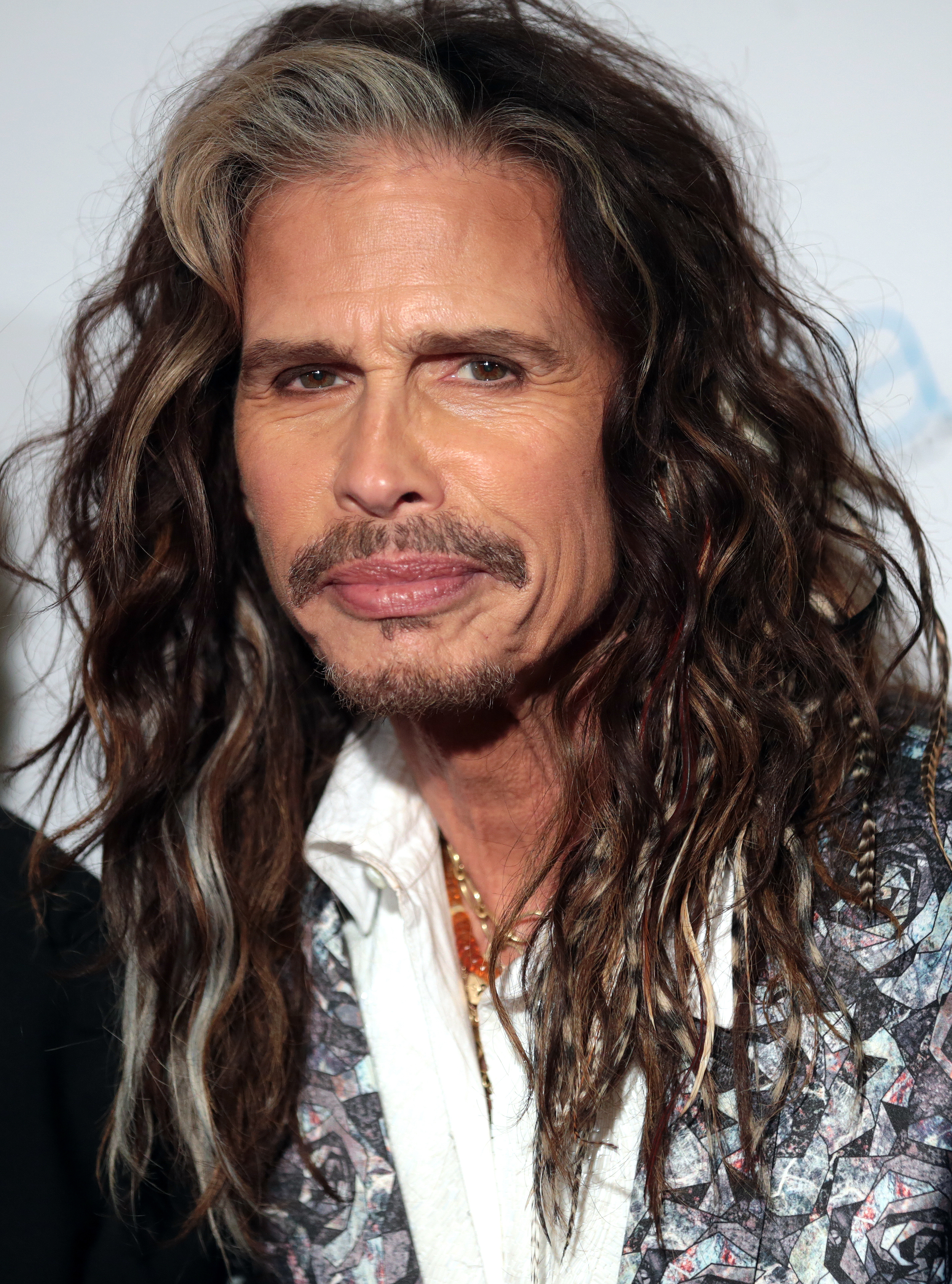
Steven Tyler, lead singer of the rock band Aerosmith, reached number one with his solo album We're All Somebody from Somewhere.

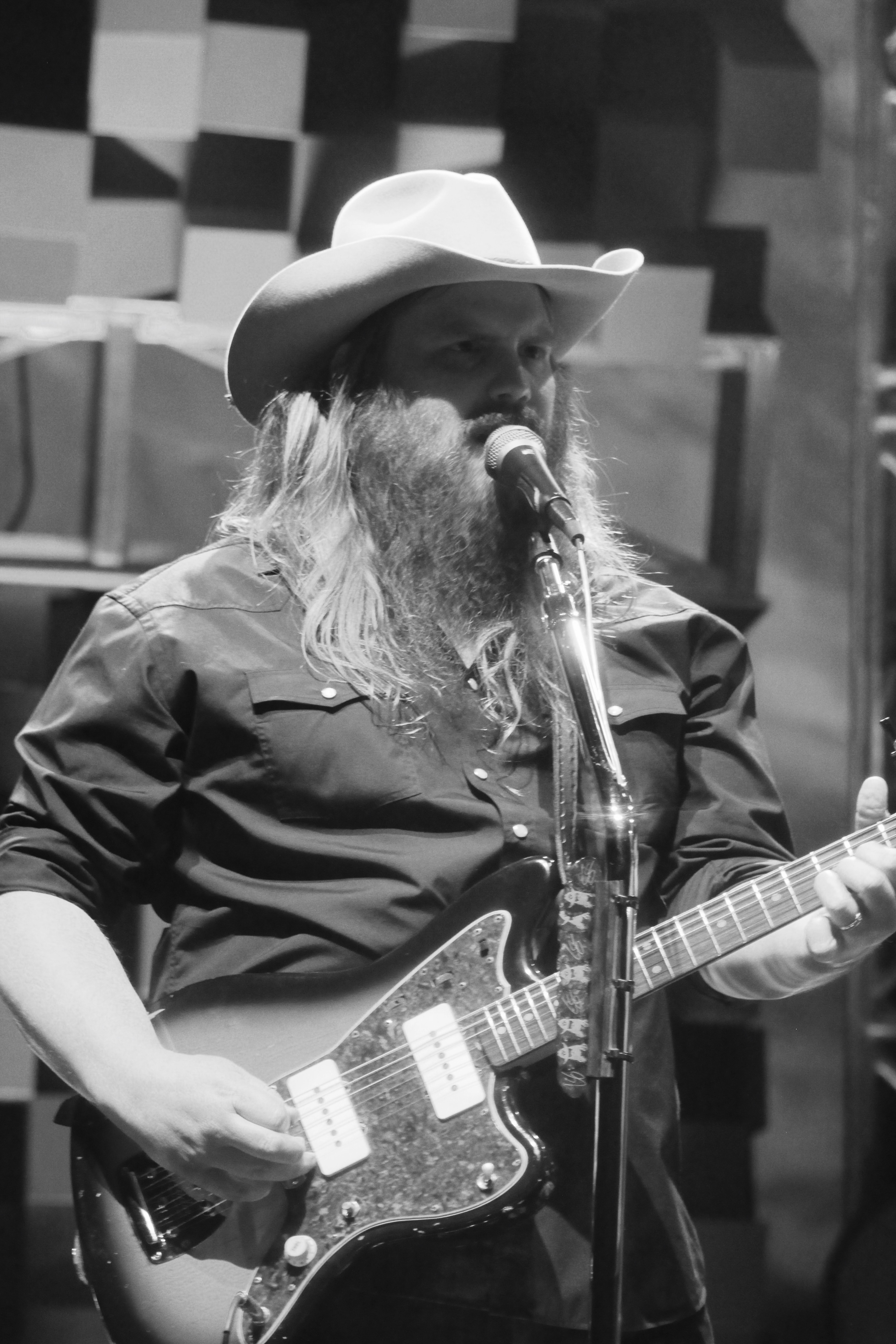
Chris Stapleton spent the most weeks at number one in 2016.

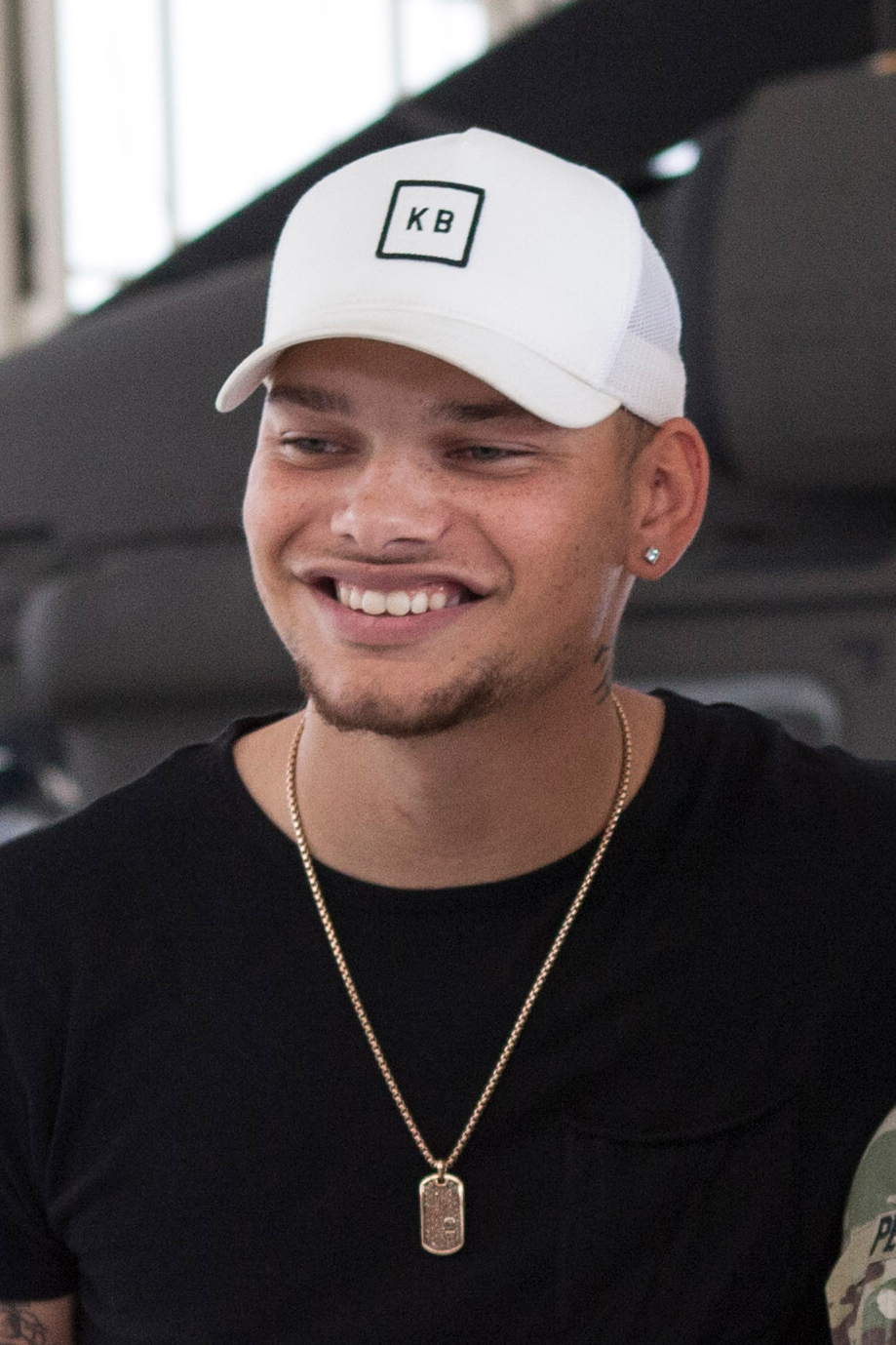
Kane Brown topped the chart with his self-titled debut album.

Issue date	Title	Artist(s)	Ref.
January 2	Traveller	Chris Stapleton	
January 9	Traveller	Chris Stapleton	
January 16	Traveller	Chris Stapleton	
January 23	Traveller	Chris Stapleton	
January 30	Traveller	Chris Stapleton	
February 6	Traveller	Chris Stapleton	
February 13	Traveller	Chris Stapleton	
February 20	Traveller	Chris Stapleton	
February 27	Traveller	Chris Stapleton	
March 5	Hymns That Are Important to Us	Joey + Rory	
March 12	Traveller	Chris Stapleton	
March 19	Traveller	Chris Stapleton	
March 26	Hymns That Are Important to Us	Joey + Rory	
April 2	Hymns That Are Important to Us	Joey + Rory	
April 9	Hymns That Are Important to Us	Joey + Rory	
April 16	Traveller	Chris Stapleton	
April 23	Traveller	Chris Stapleton	
April 30	Traveller	Chris Stapleton	
May 7	A Sailor's Guide to Earth	Sturgill Simpson	
May 14	Traveller	Chris Stapleton	
May 21	Traveller	Chris Stapleton	
May 28	Ripcord	Keith Urban	
June 4	Ripcord	Keith Urban	
June 11	If I'm Honest	Blake Shelton	
June 18	Black	Dierks Bentley	
June 25	Hero	Maren Morris	
July 2	If I'm Honest	Blake Shelton	
July 9	California Sunrise	Jon Pardi	
July 16	Traveller	Chris Stapleton	
July 23	If I'm Honest	Blake Shelton	
July 30	Traveller	Chris Stapleton	
August 6	We're All Somebody from Somewhere	Steven Tyler	
August 13	Traveller	Chris Stapleton	
August 20	American Love	Jake Owen	
August 27	If I'm Honest	Blake Shelton	
September 3	Kinda Don't Care	Justin Moore	
September 10	Pure & Simple	Dolly Parton	
September 17	Dig Your Roots	Florida Georgia Line	
September 24	Dig Your Roots	Florida Georgia Line	
October 1	They Don't Know	Jason Aldean	
October 8	Sinner	Aaron Lewis	
October 15	Farm Tour... Here's to the Farmer	Luke Bryan	
October 22	They Don't Know	Jason Aldean	
October 29	They Don't Know	Jason Aldean	
November 5	Like an Arrow	Blackberry Smoke	
November 12	Traveller	Chris Stapleton	
November 19	Cosmic Hallelujah	Kenny Chesney	
November 26	Cosmic Hallelujah	Kenny Chesney	
December 3	Christmas Together	Garth Brooks and Trisha Yearwood	
December 10	The Weight of These Wings	Miranda Lambert	
December 17	The Weight of These Wings	Miranda Lambert	
December 24	Kane Brown	Kane Brown	
December 31	The Ultimate Collection	Garth Brooks	

== See also ==
- 2016 in music
- List of number-one country singles of 2016 (U.S.)
