= Live, Laugh, Love (Clay Walker album) =

Studio album by Clay Walker
- Released: August 24, 1999
- Genre: Country
- Length: 40:58
- Label: Giant
- Producers: Doug Johnson; Clay Walker

Clay Walker chronology
| Greatest Hits (1998) | Live, Laugh, Love (1999) | Say No More (2001) |

Singles from Live, Laugh, Love
- 1. "She's Always Right" Released: January 12, 1999; 2. "Live, Laugh, Love" Released: August 9, 1999; 3. "The Chain of Love" Released: January 10, 2000; 4. "Once in a Lifetime Love" Released: May 9, 2000

Live, Laugh, Love is the fifth studio album by American country music singer Clay Walker. It was released August 24, 1999, on Giant Records. The album was certified gold by the RIAA and reached number 55 on the Billboard 200 albums chart. "She's Always Right", the title track, "The Chain of Love" and "Once in a Lifetime" were all released as singles, reaching numbers 16, 11, 3 and 50, respectively, on the Hot Country Songs chart. In addition, Walker's rendition of the Earl Thomas Conley single "Holding Her and Loving You" charted from unsolicited airplay received prior to the album's release.

== Background ==
In an interview with Yahoo Music, Walker stated, "I think that I have worried in the past about trying not to sound too country on some songs and trying not to sound too pop on other songs, and I didn't really worry about that this time, I just sang the songs the best I could. It sounds very cliché, but I gave it everything I had on every song." In an interview with the Associated Press, Walker revealed, "Holding Her and Loving You is probably the most controversial song that I've ever recorded. It's controversial for me because I don't believe in remaking a song that is great." Walker also went on to say that Earl Thomas Conley's version "Will always be the best version of it."

In an interview with The Virginian-Pilot Walker said, "The theme of the album is freedom. While I did it, I felt so free. I didn't think about what I was going to do." In the same interview, Walker also stated that "Once in a Lifetime Love" was one of his favorite songs and said "It's probably the best vocal performance I've ever given. I was listening to Whitney Houston's version of `I Will Always Love You' - man, I want to write something like that." During an interview with The West Australian Walker said "This is a very mature record for me. I think the Latin influence is where I want to go. I love Latin music and I'm sure it's something I want to pursue. It moves me emotionally and it's something new musically." In an interview with the Las Vegas Sun Walker said, "For every album that you do, you look for 10 songs that are good songs, that are different from each other." Walker also explained the words in the album's title by saying "I don't think there are many things more important than those. Life gets complicated enough because we allow it to."

Walker told The Hour, that the song "Cold Hearted" captures that part of his personality and said, "In the past, I felt like that part of me has not had a chance to come through on some of my records. Now I feel like on this new album that part of me is coming through. I'm not really holding back on this record. It's very much about baring my soul. I've never really let it all out before in the studio like I did on this album." He also said, "Although my single releases have not been exactly repeats of each other, I think there is a trap that some people in this business fall into. They have a hit with one type of song and then try to do another one just like it. To some extent I wasn't throwing enough curve balls to radio and to my fans when it came to my singles, so here's the curve ball they've all been waiting for, and I'm happy to say it's right across the plate!"

== Critical reception ==
Professional ratings
Review scores
| Source | Rating |
|---|---|
| AllMusic | 3/5 stars |
| Cincinnati Post | B |
| Houston Chronicle | 3.5/5 stars |
| USA Today | 2.5/5 stars |

Paul Verna of Billboard wrote "Clay Walker is quietly establishing himself as one of today's leading men in country. He has always had a strong live act, and that quality has been increasingly evident on his albums." Verna also listed "Holding Her and Loving You" and "If a Man Ain't Thinking ('Bout His Woman)" as standout tracks on the album and said "The real surprise is Walker's cutting loose with some soul singing on "This Time Love." Cathalena E. Burch of The Arizona Daily Star wrote the album "Contains many of the elements that have made him a Nashville standout: airy, fun dance songs and light, memorable ballads that don't weigh heavy on your heart. Songs like "She's Always Right" and his rendition of Earl Thomas Conley's classic "Holding Her and Loving You" add a raw-edged "live" quality that likely will produce a number of chart-toppers."

Stephen Thomas Erlewine of AllMusic gave the album three stars out of five and wrote "Ultimately, Live, Laugh, Love drags a bit too much to rank among Walker's best, but it has its moments." Rick Mitchell of the Houston Chronicle gave the album three and a half stars and wrote, "Walker clearly wanted to make a deeper statement with this album. And thanks to co-producer Doug Johnson, his voice has never sounded more "live" and upfront in the mix. Walker has passed out the best music of his career here. What should come back around is his biggest hit yet."

Greg Crawford of the Detroit Free Press gave the album a mixed review writing, "Walker soars and scores with the bluesy "This Time Love," a tune that would be at home at a Ray Charles concert. And if he doesn't quite raise the roof with the power ballad "Once in a Lifetime Love," he at least pushes himself to some new vocal and emotional heights. On the downside, Walker is neither powerful nor convincing on "Cold Hearted," a lame flirtation with rock, and he's saddled with a Tex-Mex-flavored title track that is the musical equivalent of a fast- food burrito. This is Walker's fifth studio disc, and he uses it to show that he's ready to stretch and grow a bit." The Cincinnati Post gave the album a B rating and wrote "It is a far more varied collection of tunes than we have heard from him before." Brian Wahlert of Country Standard Time gave the album a mixed review and wrote, "This album treads no new ground. So, it should please Walker's existing fans, but probably won't win him many new ones."

Mikel Toombs of The San Diego Union-Tribune wrote "Walker specializes in fanfare. Live, Laugh, Love is heavy on sensitive-guy ballads including the gooey "Once in a Lifetime Love, and finds time for targeted crowd-pleasers like "It Ain't Called the Heartland (for Nothin')" and "The Chain of Love. Departing a bit from the usual are the lively title tune and "Cold Hearted," which co-writer Walker based on Bob Seger's "Night Moves" and, at least subconsciously, "Honky Tonk Women." Ken Rosenbaum of The Patriot Ledger gave the album a positive review writing, "Walker mixes in tunes with a light rock edge, but he's heaviest on the two-step love songs that caress the eardrums with his soothing baritone. "This Time Love" has a raw, low-down, and urgent feel. If you're a country fan, listening doesn't get much better than this—and you can dance to it, too." The editors at USA Today gave the album two and a half stars and wrote, "He makes a bit like a modern-day Marty Robbins by giving the title track a Caribbean feel and borrowing blues-rock riffs from the Rolling Stones for Cold Hearted. He stretches out as a singer, too, using scoops, growls and falsetto to get the songs over. The songs, which often relate how he's wondrously mystified by the opposite sex, aren't always worth the effort he puts into them, but any problems with Live, Laugh, Love come more from the material than from Walker's earnest performance. DJ Joe Sixpack of Slipcue gave the album a favorable review and wrote, "One of Walker's better, and more consistent, efforts. Worth checking out." Lance Ringel of The Lakeland Ledger gave the album a favorable review and praised the title track as well as "Holding Her and Loving You", "The Chain of Love", and "It Ain't Called Heartland (For Nothin')." Ralph Novak of People Magazine gave the album a favorable review and wrote, "Bottom Line: Looking at life from both sides now."

== Track listing ==
| No. | Title | Writer(s) | Length |
|---|---|---|---|
| 1. | "She's Always Right" | Richie McDonald, Ed Hill, Phil Barnhart | 3:24 |
| 2. | "Lose Some Sleep Tonight" | M. Jason Greene, Clay Walker | 3:04 |
| 3. | "Holding Her and Loving You" | Walt Aldridge, Tom Brasfield | 3:22 |
| 4. | "Cold Hearted" | Greene, Walker | 3:57 |
| 5. | "If a Man Ain't Thinking ('Bout His Woman)" | Buddy Brock, Debi Cochran, Jerry Kilgore | 3:11 |
| 6. | "Once in a Lifetime Love" | Greene, Walker | 4:30 |
| 7. | "It Ain't Called Heartland (For Nothin')" | Justin Lantz, Bryan Wayne | 3:40 |
| 8. | "Woman Thing" | Larry Boone, Tracy Lawrence, Paul Nelson | 2:50 |
| 9. | "This Time Love" | Pat Bunch, Randy Boudreaux | 3:51 |
| 10. | "The Chain of Love" | Jonnie Barnett, Rory Feek | 5:03 |
| 11. | "Live, Laugh, Love" | Gary Nicholson, Allen Shamblin | 4:06 |

== Personnel ==
- Eddie Bayers – drums, percussion
- Joe Chemay – bass guitar
- Dan Dugmore – steel guitar
- Shannon Forrest – percussion
- Larry Franklin – fiddle
- Paul Franklin – steel guitar
- Sonny Garrish – steel guitar
- Steve Gibson – mandolin, acoustic guitar
- Wes Hightower – background vocals
- John Hobbs – piano, Hammond B-3 organ, keyboards
- David Hungate – bass guitar
- Mike Jones – background vocals
- B. James Lowry – acoustic guitar
- Liana Manis – background vocals
- Blue Miller – background vocals
- Joey Miskulin – accordion
- Tom Roady – percussion
- Matt Rollings – piano
- Brent Rowan – electric guitar, gut string guitar, acoustic guitar
- John Wesley Ryles – background vocals
- Leland Sklar – bass guitar
- Clay Walker – lead vocals
- Biff Watson – acoustic guitar, electric guitar
- John Willis – acoustic guitar
- Lonnie Wilson – drums
- Curtis Young – background vocals

== Chart performance ==
During its debut week it sold over 26,000 units. On the day of the album's release, Walker met with fans outside a Walmart in Moore, Oklahoma to celebrate the release.

=== Weekly charts ===
Weekly chart performance for Live, Laugh, Love
| Chart (1999) | Peak position |
|---|---|
| Canadian RPM Country Albums | 23 |
| U.S. Billboard 200 | 55 |
| U.S. Billboard Top Country Albums | 5 |

=== Year-end charts ===
Year-end chart performance for Live, Laugh, Love
| Chart (2000) | Position |
|---|---|
| US Billboard Top Country Albums | 33 |

== Certifications ==
Certifications for Live, Laugh, Love
| Country | Certification |
|---|---|
| United States | Gold |
