= His and Hers (album) =

Studio album by Joey + Rory
- Released: July 31, 2012
- Recorded: 2011–2012
- Genres: Country, bluegrass
- Length: 37:06
- Label: Vanguard/Sugar Hill
- Producer: Gary Paczosa

Joey + Rory chronology
A Farmhouse Christmas (2011)	His and Hers (2012)	Inspired: Songs of Faith & Family (2013)

Singles from His and Hers
- 1. "When I'm Gone" Released: July 30, 2012; 2. "Josephine" Released: July 30, 2012

Professional ratings
Review scores
Source	Rating
Roughstock	4.5/5 stars
Slant	2.5/5 stars
Allmusic	4/5 stars

His and Hers is the fourth studio album from country music duo Joey + Rory. The album was released on July 31, 2012, via Vanguard Records and Sugar Hill Records. "When I'm Gone" and "Josephine" served as the album's first two singles and were simultaneously released to radio before the album. "Teaching Me How to Love You" previously appeared on Blaine Larsen's debut album Off to Join the World, which was co-produced by Rory Lee Feek and featured Joey Feek on backing vocals.

== Track listing ==
1. "Josephine" (Rory Lee Feek) – 5:21
2. "Waiting for Someone" (R.L. Feek, Erin Enderlin) – 3:21
3. "Someday When I Grow Up" (R.L. Feek, Tonya Lynette Stout, Dan Demay) – 2:52
4. "Let's Pretend We Never Met" (Kent Blazy, Leslie Satcher) – 2:40
5. "A Bible and a Belt" (R.L. Feek, Phillip Coleman) – 3:35
6. "When I'm Gone" (Sandy Emory Lawrence) – 3:55
7. "Your Man Loves You Honey" (Tom T. Hall) – 2:20
8. "Love Your Man" (Heidi Feek, Joey Feek, R.L. Feek) – 2:36
9. "Cryin' Smile" (Phil O'Donnell, Gary Hannan, Ken Johnson) – 3:17
10. "He's a Cowboy" (David C. Banning, Cleve Clark, AJ Clark) – 4:08
11. "Teaching Me How to Love You" (R.L. Feek, Marty Dodson) – 2:46
12. "His and Hers" (R.L. Feek, Erin Enderlin) – 2:55

== Personnel ==
Joey + Rory

- Rory Feek - lead vocals, background vocals
- Joey Feek - lead vocals, background vocals

Additional Musicians

- Alvarado Road Show - background vocals
- Steve Brewster - drums
- Dennis Crouch - bass guitar
- Stuart Duncan - fiddle, viola
- Heidi Feek - background vocals
- Mike Johnson - steel guitar
- Randy Kohrs - dobro
- Sandy Emory Lawrence - background vocals
- Gordon Mote - piano
- Jon Randall Stewart - acoustic guitar, baritone guitar, electric guitar, background vocals
- Bryan Sutton - acoustic guitar, electric guitar, mandolin
- Glenn Worf - bass guitar

== Chart performance ==
Album

His and Hers debuted at number 112 on the U.S. Billboard 200, as well as number 24 on the U.S. Billboard Top Country Albums and number 19 on U.S. Billboard Independent Albums charts.

Chart (2012)	Peak position
US Billboard 200	112
US Billboard Independent Albums	19
US Billboard Top Country Albums	24

Singles

Year	Single
2012	"When I'm Gone"
2012	"Josephine"
