= To Say Goodbye =

Single by Joey + Rory

from the album The Life of a Song
- Released: July 27, 2009
- Genre: Country
- Length: 3:42
- Label: Sugar Hill/Vanguard
- Songwriter(s): Rory Lee Feek; Joey Martin Feek; Jamie Teachenor
- Producer(s): Carl Jackson

Joey + Rory singles chronology
"Play the Song" (2009)	"To Say Goodbye" (2009)	"This Song's for You" (2010)

"To Say Goodbye" is a song written and recorded by American country duo Joey + Rory. It was released in July 2009 as the third single from their debut album, The Life of a Song. Both members of Joey + Rory wrote the song along with Jamie Teachenor.

== Content ==
"To Say Goodbye" is a piano ballad. In the first verse, the song describes a woman whose husband was killed in 9/11, and in the second an old man whose wife has Alzheimer's and cannot remember who he is. The chorus finds both realizing they didn't get the chance "to say goodbye."

'Cause she wants to put her arms around his neck, and look in his eyes so blue
And say "Honey I don't regret a single day I spent with you"
She wants to tell him that she loves him so, and will until the day she dies
It ain't that she can't let him go, she just wants to say goodbye

Joey + Rory dedicated a special website to coincide with the single's release, an online community where people could share their personal stories and potentially say goodbye to the loved ones even after they're gone. Joey Martin uploaded a video of her talking about how she herself didn't get the chance "to say goodbye" to her brother Justin, who died in a car crash in July 1994. Additionally, Joey + Rory's MySpace features an edited version of the song, which includes a spoken intro from Joey describing her emotional connection to the song.

== Reception ==
The song received mixed reception from critics. Bobby Peacock of Roughstock reviewed the song positively, comparing Joey's vocals to Patty Loveless', and the song's theme to her 1994 single "How Can I Help You Say Goodbye". He also said, "[I]t still sounds as fresh and laid-back as the rest of the duo's releases[…]Joey + Rory find themselves faced with the challenge of releasing a slow, sad song in the summertime. But it's certainly a challenge worth facing, especially with music this strong." Stephen M. Deusner of Engine 145 gave the song a thumbs down. "National tragedies and personal illnesses are certainly legitimate concerns for musicians and artists to address, but this song indulges melodrama with no real focus or point." He also added that the song felt "weirdly truncated, as if there’s a third verse missing".
