= The Life of a Song (Joey + Rory album) =

Studio album by Joey + Rory
- Released: October 28, 2008
- Recorded: 2008
- Genres: Country, bluegrass
- Length: 37:55
- Label: Vanguard/Sugar Hill
- Producer: Carl Jackson

Joey + Rory chronology
The Life of a Song (2008)	Album Number Two (2010)

Singles from The Life of a Song
- 1. "Cheater, Cheater" Released: September 17, 2008; 2. "Play the Song" Released: March 16, 2009; 3. "To Say Goodbye" Released: July 27, 2009

Professional ratings
Review scores
Source	Rating
Country Standard Time	favorable link
Country Weekly	link
Country Universe	link
Roughstock	favorable link

The Life of a Song is the debut studio album from American country music duo Joey + Rory. The album was released on October 28, 2008 via Vanguard and Sugar Hill Records. It was produced by Carl Jackson. The album features songs which Joey and Rory sang on Can You Duet.

The first single from the album, "Cheater, Cheater" was released in September 2008 and has become a Top 40 hit on the Hot Country Songs charts. This song was previously recorded by the duo Bomshel, whose own version failed to chart earlier in 2008. "Play the Song" and "To Say Goodbye" followed in March and July 2009, respectively. Also included is a cover of Lynyrd Skynyrd's "Free Bird".

The song "Sweet Emmylou" was named the best country song of 2008 by country music blog Engine 145. The song was previously recorded by co-writer Catherine Britt as a hidden track of her album Little Wildflower.

== Track listing ==
No.	Title	Writer(s)	Length
1.	"Play the Song"	Rory Feek	2:58
2.	"Sweet Emmylou"	R. Feek, Catherine Britt	3:36
3.	"Tonight Cowboy You're Mine"	R. Feek, Joey Feek, Heidi Feek	2:52
4.	"Cheater, Cheater"	R. Feek, J. Feek, Kristy Osmunson, Wynn Varble	2:59
5.	"Rodeo"	R. Feek, J. Feek, Cory Batten	3:55
6.	"Heart of the Wood"	Dan Demay, Tony Villanueva	3:38
7.	"Tune of a Twenty Dollar Bill"	Shawn Camp, Mark D. Sanders	4:02
8.	"Loved the Hell"	R. Feek, J. Feek, Varble	2:42
9.	"Free Bird"	Allen Collins, Ronnie Van Zant	3:49
10.	"Boots"	Mike Ward, Touchstone McDonald, Mark Harris	3:08
11.	"To Say Goodbye"	R. Feek, J. Feek, Jamie Teachenor	3:42
12.	"The Life of a Song"	Patrick Jason Matthews, Rebecca Lynn Howard	3:14

== Personnel ==
Joey + Rory

- Rory Feek - acoustic guitar, vocals
- Joey Feek - vocals

Additional Musicians

- Tony Creasman - drums
- Kevin "Swine" Grantt - bass guitar
- Aubrey Haynie - baritone violin, fiddle, mandolin
- Rob Ickes - dobro, lap steel guitar, Weissenborn
- Carl Jackson - banjo, acoustic guitar, background vocals
- Mike Johnson - steel guitar
- Kirk "Jelly Roll" Johnson - harmonica
- Catherine Marx - piano, synthesizer strings
- Bryan Sutton - acoustic guitar
- Ilya Toshinsky - acoustic guitar, baritone guitar, electric guitar
- Guthrie Trapp - electric guitar
- Bradley Walker - background vocals

== Chart performance ==
The Life of a Song debuted at #10 on the Top Country albums and at #61 on the Billboard 200, selling approximately 8,000 copies in the first week. As of April 2010, the album has sold 215,000 copies.

=== Weekly charts ===
Chart (2008)	Peak position
US Billboard 200	61
US Top Country Albums (Billboard)	10

=== Year-end charts ===
Chart (2009)	Position
US Top Country Albums (Billboard)	39
