= Heidi Feek =

American singer-songwriter (born 1986)

- Born: Heidi Caroline Feek; October 3, 1986 (age 40); Beaufort, South Carolina, United States
- Origin: Nashville, Tennessee, United States
- Genres: Country, folk, Americana
- Occupations: Musician, singer-songwriter
- Instruments: Vocals, guitar
- Years active: 2010–present
- Label: Western Pin-Up

Heidi Caroline Feek (born October 3, 1986) is an Americana singer and songwriter from Nashville, Tennessee.

== Early life ==
Feek is the daughter of Rory Feek of country music duo Joey + Rory. She moved around growing up as her father was in the Marine Corps. Her family moved from Dallas, TX when she was in the third grade to Nashville, TN and her father bought a farm in Columbia, TN, where she grew up with her sister and father.

== Music career ==
Feek started her professional music career singing back-up for country duo Joey + Rory, in 2010. After releasing two solo EP's, she joined "firekid" (Dillon Hodges) in 2015 for his North American tour for his self-titled, debut album, firekid. She continued to perform with Hodges in 2016, providing electronic accompaniment to his singing.

Feek released her first EP, Eden, in 2010. Her music and vocals have been compared to Patsy Cline, Chris Isaak, and Neko Case. Her debut, full-length album, The Only, was released on October 8, 2013, via Western Pin-Up Records.American Songwriter premiered the music video for her first single, "Someday Somebody" on September 18, 2013. The video stars Caitlin Rose and Sam Farkas (Space Capone).

In 2014, Feek released a video for her single, "Trail Pop". In 2015, Feek's recording of "Heartbreak Hotel" was used in the soundtrack of trailers for the film American Horror Story.

In 2016 Feek's father Rory released an album, Hymns That Are Important to Us, on which she sings harmony.

== Film and television ==
In 2016 Feek was music supervisor for the film Josephine, created by Rory Feek and based on the notes of a Civil War soldier.

== Discography ==
=== Albums ===
Title	Album details	Track listing
Eden EP	Release date: 2010; Label: Self-released	1. Blue Tonight; 2. Let You Back In; 3. Jane; 4. Sylvia; 5. Eden
The Only	Release date: October 8, 2013; Label: Western Pin-Up Records	1. I Like The Way (Heidi Feek, Rory Lee Feek); 2. Someday Somebody (Heidi Feek, Rory Lee Feek); 3. 57 Bel Air (Heidi Feek, Rory Lee Feek); 4. The Only (Heidi Feek); 5. Berlin (Heidi Feek, Rory Lee Feek, James T. Slater); 6. One Night With You (Heidi Feek, Rory Lee Feek, Austin Manuel, Aaron Carnahan); 7. Pretty Boy (Heidi Feek, Rory Lee Feek, Aaron Carnahan); 8. Take It Slow (Heidi Feek, Rory Lee Feek); 9. There Lives A Fool (Rory Lee Feek, Sara Evans); 10. I Didn't Know About You (Heidi Feek, Rory Lee Feek, James T. Slater); 11. Heartbreak Hotel (Mae Boren Axton, Tommy Durden, Elvis Presley)

=== Music videos ===
Year	Video	Director
2013	"Someday Somebody"	Gabe McCauley
2016	"Lay By Me"	Dillon Hodges
