= Country Classics: A Tapestry of Our Musical Heritage =

Studio album by Joey + Rory
- Released: October 14, 2014
- Studios: The Farmhouse Studio, Pottsville, Tennessee & Beaird Studio, Nashville, Tennessee
- Genre: Country
- Length: 40:13
- Label: Gaither Music Group / Farmhouse Recordings
- Producer: Rory Feek

Joey + Rory chronology
Made to Last (2013)	Country Classics: A Tapestry of Our Musical Heritage (2014)	Hymns That Are Important to Us (2016)

Country Classics: A Tapestry of Our Musical Heritage is an album by Joey + Rory, released on October 14, 2014. The album was recorded at Beaird Studio in Nashville, and The Farmhouse Studio in Pottsville, Tennessee.

== Track listing ==
No.	Title	Writer(s)	Length
1.	"How's the World Treating You"	Chet Atkins; Boudleaux Bryant	3:05
2.	"Don't It Make My Brown Eyes Blue"	Richard Leigh	2:52
3.	"I'm Not Lisa"	Jessi Colter	3:22
4.	"Rocky Top"	Felice Bryant; Boudleaux Bryant	3:17
5.	"Let It Be Me"	Gilbert Bécaud; Pierre Delanoë; Manny Kurtz	3:28
6.	"King of the Road"	Roger Miller	2:21
7.	"If I Needed You"	Townes Van Zandt	3:36
8.	"I Believe In You"	Sam Hogin; Roger Cook	4:18
9.	"Hello Love"	Betty Jean Robinson; Aileen Mnich	3:02
10.	"Coat of Many Colors"	Dolly Parton	3:13
11.	"Paper Roses"	Fred Spielman; Janice Torre	3:00
12.	"Back Home Again"	John Denver	4:39
Total length:			40:13

== Charts ==
=== Weekly charts ===
Chart (2016)	Peak position
US Billboard 200	199
US Top Country Albums (Billboard)	13

=== Year-end charts ===
Chart (2016)	Position
US Top Country Albums (Billboard)	72
