= This Song's for You =

Single by Joey + Rory featuring Zac Brown Band

from the album Album Number Two
- Released: July 20, 2010
- Genre: Country
- Length: 3:58
- Label: Sugar Hill/Vanguard
- Songwriter(s): Rory Lee Feek; Zac Brown
- Producer(s): Keith Stegall

Joey + Rory singles chronology
"To Say Goodbye" (2009)	"This Song's for You" (2010)	"That's Important to Me" (2010)

Zac Brown Band singles chronology
"Free" (2010)	"This Song's for You" (2010)	"As She's Walking Away" (2010)

"This Song's for You" is a song written by Rory Lee Feek and Zac Brown and recorded by American country duo Joey + Rory. It was released to country radio in July 2010 and as a music download on July 20, 2010, and serves as the lead-off single to their second studio album, Album Number Two, which was released on September 14, 2010.

== Content ==
"This Song's for You" is a mid-tempo backed primarily by steel guitar, mandolin and fiddle. In the first verse, the narrator makes note of the average hard-working American ("If you put eight honest hours in for eight hours' worth of pay") who regularly attends church and loves the country they call home ("If you wish we didn't have to go and send our boys to war / But you still think this country of ours' is sure worth dyin' for"). In the second verse, the narrator makes note of the song's neo-traditional production as being a thing of the past, and that people paying money for their concerts deserve to hear it ("If you paid your hard-earned money to that bouncer at the door / To hear the kinds of songs you don't hear too much anymore"). The song's chorus highlights that the fans are the real stars, and that they are the reason artists record music.

The song's verses alternate vocals between Joey + Rory, while the bridge is performed by Zac Brown of the Zac Brown Band, who co-wrote the song with Rory Lee Feek while they were out on tour together. Rory Lee Feek said the song "was written specifically for our fans, telling them how we feel about them," and to thank them for supporting the duo by attending their concerts. The song was well-received with fans on tour that they went into the studio and recorded it for their new album, which led to the lead single being changed from "That's Important to Me."

The single was released as a music download on July 20, 2010, with a cover of Loretta Lynn's "You Ain't Woman Enough (To Take My Man)" as a bonus track.

== Reception ==
Marc Erikson of Roughstock spoke favorably of the duo's choice to showcase Rory's vocals in the form of a true duet, which he believed help make the song "feel like not only an instant classic but a downright ‘breakthrough' for the husband and wife duo." Leeann Ward of Country Universe gave the song a B+ rating, stating that the song "oozes with sincerity" and that it "strikes just the magic balance" in its risky task of "pleasing a crowd of diverse people in just a few stanzas." She also spoke favorably of the song's traditional country production and the change in which Joey + Rory sing in duet form. Juli Thanki of Engine 145 gave the song a thumbs down, stating that while the song's vocals are a "sincere delivery" and the production is "pleasantly neotraditional," the lyrics (particularly in the chorus) are "at times cringe-inducing in its cheesiness and, to some ears, nudges a toe over the line separating appreciation and pandering."

== Music video ==
A music video for the song was announced during the 2010 CMA Music Festival, and a sneak preview of the video was uploaded to CMT. The video, which was shot in Pottsville, Tennessee and directed by Darren Doane, was released in August 2010.
