= How Do You Get That Lonely =

Single by Blaine Larsen

from the album Off to Join the World
- Released: November 1, 2004
- Recorded: 2004
- Genre: Country
- Length: 4:07
- Label: BNA
- Songwriters: Rory Feek, Jamie Teachenor
- Producers: Rory Feek, Tim Johnson

Blaine Larsen singles chronology
"In My High School" (2004)	"How Do You Get That Lonely" (2004)	"The Best Man" (2005)

Music video
- "How Do You Get That Lonely" (Giantslayer) on YouTube

Music video
- "How Do You Get That Lonely" (BNA) on YouTube

"How Do You Get That Lonely" is a song written by Rory Feek and Jamie Teachenor, and recorded by American country music artist Blaine Larsen. It was released November 1, 2004, reaching number 18 on the Billboard Hot Country Singles & Tracks chart. It also peaked at #91 on the Billboard Hot 100, making it Larsen's only Hot 100 entry.

== History ==
"How Do You Get That Lonely" had originally appeared in Larsen's album In My High School on Giantslayer Records. The song was the second single from the album In My High School after Giantslayer Records had released the title song "In My High School" as Larsen's debut single. After Larsen joined BNA Records, the label released the song and re-released In My High School, with one track added, as Off to Join the World.

== Content ==
"How Do You Get That Lonely," was written by Rory Feek and Jamie Teachenor as a tribute of and dedication to the memory of Lance Emmitt, of Mount Pleasant, Tennessee, the son of Mack Emmitt and Gloria Renee Thomason Mash. Lance Emmitt had committed suicide on Nov. 11, 2003. He was just 19. The song opens with reference to a small news item about the suicide of a young man.

It was just another story, printed on the second page
Underneath the Tigers' football score
It said he was only eighteen, a boy about my age
They found him face down on his bedroom floor

Tigers is the team of Mount Pleasant High School that Emmitt attended. Larsen said: "I got chills when I first heard it, and I knew it was a song I was supposed to cut".

== Music video ==
Two separate music videos were released. The first one in 2004 accompanied the release by Giantslayer Records taken from the album entitled In My High School. This video shot in black and white shows Blaine Larsen singing and playing the guitar. It was produced by lilDRAGON and directed by Gabe McCauley. Jeremy Gonzales was the director of photography.

The official music video with the release of the song by BNA came in 2005 through the duo Robert Deaton III and George Flanigen IV known as Deaton-Flanigen Productions. It shows grieving family members, including Larsen, on their way to the funeral of a young man, and they contemplating on reasons why he might have committed suicide, at the same time reflecting on their own lives. The music video ends with them arriving at the funeral site.

== Chart performance ==
Chart (2004–2005)	Peak position
US Hot Country Songs (Billboard)	18
US Billboard Hot 100	91
