= Off to Join the World =

2004 album by Blaine Larsen

In My High School

Studio album by Blaine Larsen
- Released: June 1, 2004
- Genre: Country
- Label: Giantslayer
- Producer: Rory Lee Feek and Tim Johnson

Blaine Larsen chronology
In My High School (2004)	Off to Join the World (2005)

Singles from In My High School
- 1. "In My High School" Released: 2004

Off to Join the World

Studio album by Blaine Larsen
- Released: January 25, 2005
- Genre: Country
- Length: 37:02
- Label: BNA/Giantslayer
- Producer: Rory Lee Feek and Tim Johnson

Blaine Larsen chronology
In My High School (2004)	Off to Join the World (2005)	Rockin' You Tonight (2006)

Singles from Off to Join the World
- 1. "How Do You Get That Lonely" Released: 2005; 2. "The Best Man" Released: 2005

Professional ratings
Review scores
Source	Rating
Allmusic	4.5/5 stars

In My High School is the debut studio album by American country music artist Blaine Larsen. It was released on 1 June 2004 on the independent label, Giantslayer Records. Its lead-off single, "In My High School", also released in 2004 peaked at number 60 on the Billboard Hot Country Singles & Tracks (now Hot Country Songs).

Later in 2004, Larsen was signed to BNA Records, who re-issued the album on 25 January 2005 as Off to Join the World. One new song, "That's All I've Got to Say About That", was added to the album. Also, "If Merle Would Sing My Song", which was a solo rendition on the original album, was partially re-recorded with Merle Haggard appearing as a featured artist in the track that appeared on the new album.

"How Do You Get That Lonely" was issued as the second single from the Off to Join the World album. This song became the highest-charting song of Larsen's career, reaching number 18 on the country charts and number 91 on the Billboard Hot 100. Finally, in mid-2005, "The Best Man" was released as the third single, peaking at number 36 on the country charts.

== Track listing ==
=== In My High School ===
1. The Best Man
2. In My High School
3. Teaching Me How to Love You
4. I've Been in Mexico
5. If Merle Would Sing My Song
6. Yesireebob
7. The Man He'll Never Be
8. That's Just Me
9. Off to Join the World (The Circus Song)
10. How Do You Get That Lonely

=== Personnel (In My High School) ===
- Eddie Bayers - drums
- Spady Brannan - bass guitar
- Larry Franklin - fiddle, mandolin
- Tommy Harden - drums
- Pete Huttlinger - acoustic guitar
- Mike Johnson - steel guitar
- Blaine Larsen - acoustic guitar, lead vocals
- Chris Leuzinger - electric guitar
- Sean Patrick McGraw - background vocals
- Joey Feek - background vocals on "Teaching Me How to Love You"
- Jimmy Nichols - piano, background vocals
- Russ Pahl - dobro
- Danny Parks - electric guitar
- Michael Rhodes - bass guitar
- Michael Spriggs - acoustic guitar
- Jonathan Yudkin - fiddle, mandolin

=== Off to Join the World ===
No.	Title	Writer(s)	Length
1.	"The Best Man"	Rory Feek, Tim Johnson, Blaine Larsen	3:27
2.	"In My High School"	Johnson, Larsen	3:53
3.	"That's All I've Got to Say About That"	Jim Collins, Rob Crosby, Paul Overstreet	2:52
4.	"Teaching Me How to Love You"	Marty Dodson, Feek	2:50
5.	"I've Been in Mexico"	Johnson, Larsen, Will Robinson	3:05
6.	"If Merle Would Sing My Song" (featuring Merle Haggard)	Skip Ewing, James Dean Hicks	3:40
7.	"Yessireebob"	Feek, Larsen, Kelley Lovelace	3:03
8.	"The Man He'll Never Be"	Larsen	3:33
9.	"That's Just Me"	Feek, Larsen, David Bleam	3:01
10.	"Off to Join the World (The Circus Song)"	Shawn Camp, Mark D. Sanders	3:26
11.	"How Do You Get That Lonely"	Feek, Jamie Teachenor	4:07

=== Personnel (Off to Join the World) ===
- Eddie Bayers - drums
- Bruce Bouton - steel guitar
- Spady Brannan - bass guitar
- J.T. Corenflos - electric guitar
- Rob Crosby - background vocals
- Stuart Duncan - fiddle, mandolin
- Larry Franklin - fiddle, mandolin
- Merle Haggard - duet vocals on "If Merle Would Sing My Song"
- Tommy Harden - drums
- Tony Harrell - keyboards
- Pete Huttlinger - acoustic guitar
- Mike Johnson - steel guitar
- Blaine Larsen - acoustic guitar, lead vocals
- Chris Leuzinger - electric guitar
- B. James Lowry - acoustic guitar
- Sean Patrick McGraw - background vocals
- Jerry McPherson - electric guitar
- Joey Martin - background vocals on "Teaching Me How to Love You"
- Jimmy Nichols - piano, background vocals
- Paul Overstreet - background vocals
- Russ Pahl - dobro
- Danny Parks - electric guitar
- Michael Rhodes - bass guitar
- Michael Spriggs - acoustic guitar
- Jonathan Yudkin - fiddle, mandolin

== Chart performance ==
=== Weekly charts ===
Chart (2005)	Peak position
US Billboard 200	79
US Top Country Albums (Billboard)	14

=== Year-end charts ===
Chart (2005)	Position
US Top Country Albums (Billboard)	62
