= She's Always Right =

Single by Clay Walker

from the album Live, Laugh, Love
- Released: January 12, 1999
- Genre: Country
- Length: 3:24
- Label: Giant
- Songwriters: Richie McDonald, Phil Barnhart, Ed Hill
- Producer: Doug Johnson

Clay Walker singles chronology
"You're Beginning to Get to Me" (1998)	"She's Always Right" (1999)	"Live, Laugh, Love" (1999)

"She's Always Right" is a song written by Richie McDonald, Phil Barnhart and Ed Hill, and recorded by American country music singer Clay Walker. It was released in January 1999 as the first single from his album Live, Laugh, Love. It peaked at No. 16 on the Billboard Hot Country Singles & Tracks charts, becoming his 17th Top 20 hit on that chart.

== Background ==
Walker told Country Weekly, "I loved this song from the moment I heard it. I love it when men are able to let their women be in control, because, to me, that's a sign of strength. I also love the lyrics. My favorite line is, 'She likes chocolate about as much as she likes me.' In my case, that's probably true!"

Ara Jansen of The West Australian commented to Walker about the line in the song about his partner loving chocolate as much as she likes him and Walker stated, "The quicker you realise that, the better off you are. Men stay the same and I always smile when I sing that song. I'm a much happier person in my marriage than I was five or six years ago because I figured that out." Walker told the Lodi News-Sentinel, "I'm a romantic, so I like love songs. I guess there are a lot of people out there that are in love or want to be in love."

Richie McDonald who co-wrote "She's Always Right" previously toured with Walker as a member of Lonestar in 1996.

The song’s content has no relevance to this article.

== Critical reception ==
Stephen Thomas Erlewine of AllMusic in his review of the album wrote "She's Always Right has a good sense of humor."

== Music video ==
A music video was created for the song. It was directed by Michael Merriman. The video debuted on CMT's "Delivery Room" on March 24, 1999

== Chart positions ==
=== Charts ===
Chart (1999)	Peak position
Canada Country Singles (RPM)	35
US Billboard Hot 100	74
US Hot Country Songs (Billboard)	16

=== Year-end charts ===
Chart (1999)	Position
US Country Songs (Billboard)	72
