= Once in a Lifetime Love =

Single by Clay Walker

from the album Live, Laugh, Love
- Released: May 9, 2000
- Genre: Country
- Length: 4:30
- Label: Giant
- Songwriters: Jason M. Greene, Clay Walker
- Producers: Doug Johnson, Clay Walker

Clay Walker singles chronology
"The Chain of Love" (2000)	"Once in a Lifetime Love" (2000)	"Say No More" (2001)

"Once in a Lifetime Love" is a song recorded by American country music singer Clay Walker. It was written by Walker and Jason M. Greene and released on May 9, 2000 as the fourth and final single from Walker's fifth studio album Live, Laugh, Love (1999). The song peaked at number 50 on the Billboard Hot Country Singles & Tracks chart, becoming his lowest charting single of his career as well as his first to miss the top forty.

== Background ==
In an interview with The Virginian-Pilot, Walker stated that "Once in a Lifetime Love" was one of his favorite songs and said, "It's probably the best vocal performance I've ever given. I was listening to Whitney Houston's version of "I Will Always Love You" - man, I want to write something like that."

During an interview with Billboard, Walker mentioned that producer Doug Johnson was crucial for the performance. Walker stated, "I think he got everything there is to get out of me."

== Content ==
The song is about a man who asks his lover if their love is a once-in-a-lifetime experience and what would happen if they never had a chance at it. He ponders what would happen if he never told his lover he loves her.

== Reception ==
Lance Ringel of the Lakeland Ledger praised the song by writing, "Citing Whitney Houston and Toni Braxton as role models, Walker crafts a near-flawless power ballad in "Once in a Lifetime Love". The production builds the song perfectly, and when the singer hits an unexpected high note near the end, the effect is electric. Greg Crawford of the Detroit Free Press wrote, "If he doesn't quite raise the roof with the power ballad "Once in a Lifetime Love", he at least pushes himself to some new vocal and emotional heights."

== Chart positions ==
"Once in a Lifetime Love" first entered the Hot Country Singles & Tracks chart at number 74 for the week of July 24, 1999 as an album cut. After its single release, the song peaked at No. 50 for the week of September 2, 2000 after spending eighteen weeks on the chart.

=== Charts ===
Chart (2000)	Peak position
US Hot Country Songs (Billboard)	50
