= Live, Laugh, Love (song) =

Single by Clay Walker

from the album Live, Laugh, Love
- Released: August 9, 1999
- Genre: Country
- Length: 3:44 (single version); 4:06 (album version)
- Label: Giant
- Songwriters: Gary Nicholson; Allen Shamblin
- Producers: Doug Johnson; Clay Walker

Clay Walker singles chronology
"She's Always Right" (1999)	"Live, Laugh, Love" (1999)	"The Chain of Love" (2000)

"Live, Laugh, Love" is a song written by Allen Shamblin and Gary Nicholson, and recorded by American country music singer Clay Walker. It was released in August 1999 as the second single and title track from his album of the same name. "Live, Laugh, Love" reached a peak of number 11 on the Billboard Hot Country Singles & Tracks (now Hot Country Songs) charts. It also peaked at number 21 in Canada and at number 65 on the Hot 100.

== Background ==
In an interview with The Flint Journal Walker said, "It's really become my theme song. You have to live, laugh and love no matter what's going on in your life. It's not that you ignore or go into denial about MS, but you have to make a conscious choice what your attitude is going to be."

== Content ==
The song is up-tempo in which the narrator discusses living life to the fullest.

== Critical reception ==
The editors at Billboard gave the song a positive review and wrote, "The melody is perfect for summertime radio, and the lyric, penned by Gary Nicholson and Allen Shamblin, is a positive ode to the joys of living life to its fullest. It's one of those songs that just instantly makes you feel better after you've heard it. It can almost mentally take you to a faraway beach and put a piña colada in your hand--it's that fresh and inviting." Lance Ringel of The Ledger wrote, "The title track is an utterly infectious uptempo number that has "hit" written all over it."

== Music video ==
The music video for this song was directed by Deaton Flanigen. It begins with an old man turning the stations of a radio as depressing stories are being broadcast. It then shows Walker performing the calypso and zydeco-infused song as a huge street party begins, both by himself and with a full band. All the citizens of the town instantly start to dance, and later on are sprayed with water from a fountain. He also halfway through the video takes his cowboy hat off and gives it to a female dancer, performing the rest of the song hatless. It ends with Walker's silhouette dancing by the fountain alone. It was filmed in New Orleans, LA.

== Chart performance ==
This song entered the Hot Country Singles & Tracks chart at number 70 on the chart dated August 7, 1999.

=== Charts ===
Chart (1999)	Peak position
Canada Country Singles (RPM)	21
US Billboard Hot 100	74
US Hot Country Songs (Billboard)	11
