= Jonnie Barnett =

American singer-songwriter (1945–2002)

- Born: Jonathan Barnett Kaye; December 12, 1945; Sumter, South Carolina, U.S.
- Died: August 18, 2002 (aged 56) Nashville, Tennessee, U.S.
- Genres: Rock, Country
- Occupation: Singer-songwriter
- Instrument: Vocals
- Years active: 197x–2002

Jonathan Barnett Kaye (December 12, 1945 – August 18, 2002), known as Jonnie Barnett, was an American musician. In the 1970s, he performed as an opening act for several acts, including Tom Waits, Cheech and Chong, and Frank Zappa. Barnett made appearances in the 1975 film Nashville, and in Cheech and Chong's Next Movie.

One of Barnett's compositions, "One Foot in the Blues", was recorded by Johnny Adams and received a Blues Song of the Year award from the 1997 W. C. Handy Blues Awards. Barnett also wrote a short story entitled "The Chain of Love", which appeared in the book Chicken Soup for the Country Soul. He and songwriter Rory Lee Feek later adapted this story into the song "The Chain of Love", which was a Top 5 country hit for Clay Walker in 2000. The song was based on a real-life event.

Barnett died of a stroke at the age of 56, on August 18, 2002, in Nashville.
