= Baby Don't Get Hooked on Me =

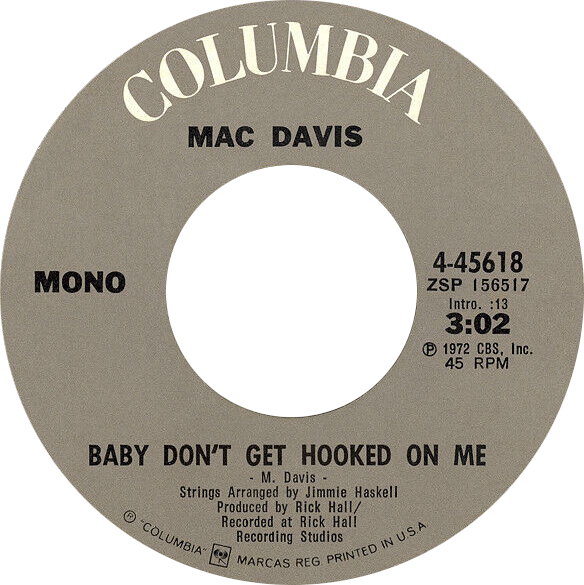
- Side A of the original US single

Single by Mac Davis

from the album Baby Don't Get Hooked on Me
- B-side: "Poem for My Little Lady"
- Released: July 1972 (US)
- Recorded: March 1, 1972
- Studio: FAME Studios, Muscle Shoals, Alabama
- Genre: Country pop
- Length: 3:06
- Label: Columbia
- Songwriter: Mac Davis
- Producer: Rick Hall

Mac Davis singles chronology
"Beginning to Feel the Pain" (1971)	"Baby Don't Get Hooked on Me" (1972)	"Everybody Loves a Love Song" (1972)

"Baby Don't Get Hooked on Me" is a hit song by country and pop singer-songwriter Mac Davis. From his breakthrough album of the same name, the song reached No.1 on both the Billboard Hot 100 and Easy Listening charts in September 1972, spending three weeks atop each chart. Billboard ranked it as the No. 8 song of 1972. Davis wrote it when the record company demanded he write a tune with a "hook".

The song was also a modest country hit concurrent with its pop success, reaching No. 26 shortly after the peak of that success in the pop realm. It was featured on an episode of The Muppet Show that Mac Davis was hosting.

== Charts ==
=== Weekly charts ===
Chart (1972)	Peak position
Australian Go-Set Chart	1
Australian KMR	2
Canadian RPM Top Singles	2
Canadian RPM Adult Contemporary Tracks	1
Canadian RPM Country Tracks	1
Ireland (IRMA)	19
New Zealand (Listener)	3
UK	29
US Billboard Hot 100	1
US Billboard Easy Listening	1
US Billboard Hot Country Singles	26

=== Year-end charts ===
Chart (1972)	Rank
Australia KMR	25
Canada RPM Top Singles	9
US Billboard Hot 100	8
US Cash Box Top 100	17

== Certifications ==
Region	Certification	Certified units/sales
United States (RIAA)	Gold	1,000,000^{^}
^{^} Shipments figures based on certification alone.

== Covers ==
- Blaine Larsen, on his 2006 album Rockin' You Tonight
- Liza Minnelli, on her 1973 album The Singer
- Rascal Flatts, used for their 2009 compilation The Vault
