= Lane Turner =

American singer-songwriter (born 1967)

- Born: Michael Lane Turner
- Origin: Monahans, Texas, United States
- Genres: Country
- Occupation: Singer-songwriter
- Instruments: Vocals, Acoustic Guitar
- Years active: 2004–present
- Label: Warner Bros.

Michael Lane Turner (born February 3, 1967, in Monahans, Texas) is an American singer-songwriter. Signed to Warner Bros. Records since 2004, he released two singles for the label, including "Always Wanting More (Breathless)", which reached No. 56 on the Hot Country Songs charts in 2004. Lane signed with Original Signal Recordings in 2009.

== Early life ==
Turner was born in Monahans, Texas, and attended school in Levelland, which he described as "a place so flat you can watch your dog run away for two days". He received his first guitar as a gift from his parents when he was eleven years old and his father taught him to play the songs he heard on the radio. He attended Texas Tech University in Lubbock, where he was an All-American decathlete. He also played in a band called Diamondback during his time in college.

== Singing career ==
Turner signed to Warner Bros. Records in 2004. He released two singles for the label—"Always Wanting More (Breathless)" and "Let You Go"—but no album. He also co-wrote Blaine Larsen's single "I Don't Know What She Said".

In 2008, Turner was a contestant on The Next GAC Star, which aired on the network Great American Country. He completed the competition as runner up to winning band One Night Rodeo.

As of early 2011, Lane has replaced Dustin Evans as lead vocalist for the country music band Western Underground, originally fronted by Chris LeDoux.

Lane has continued in the Western Underground tradition as the bass player for Ned Ledoux’s band. Ned LeDoux.

== Discography ==
=== Singles ===
Year	Single	Peak positions	Album
Year	Single	US Country	Album
2004	"Always Wanting More (Breathless)"	56	Right On Time
2006	"Let You Go"	—	Right On Time
2008	"Little Book of Matches"	—	Right On Time
2009	"Where's a Sunset (When You Need One)"	—	Lane Turner
"—" denotes releases that did not chart

=== Music videos ===
Year	Video
2006	"Let You Go"
2008	"Little Book of Matches"
2009	"Where's a Sunset (When You Need One)"
