= Joey + Rory =

American country and bluegrass duo (2008–2016)

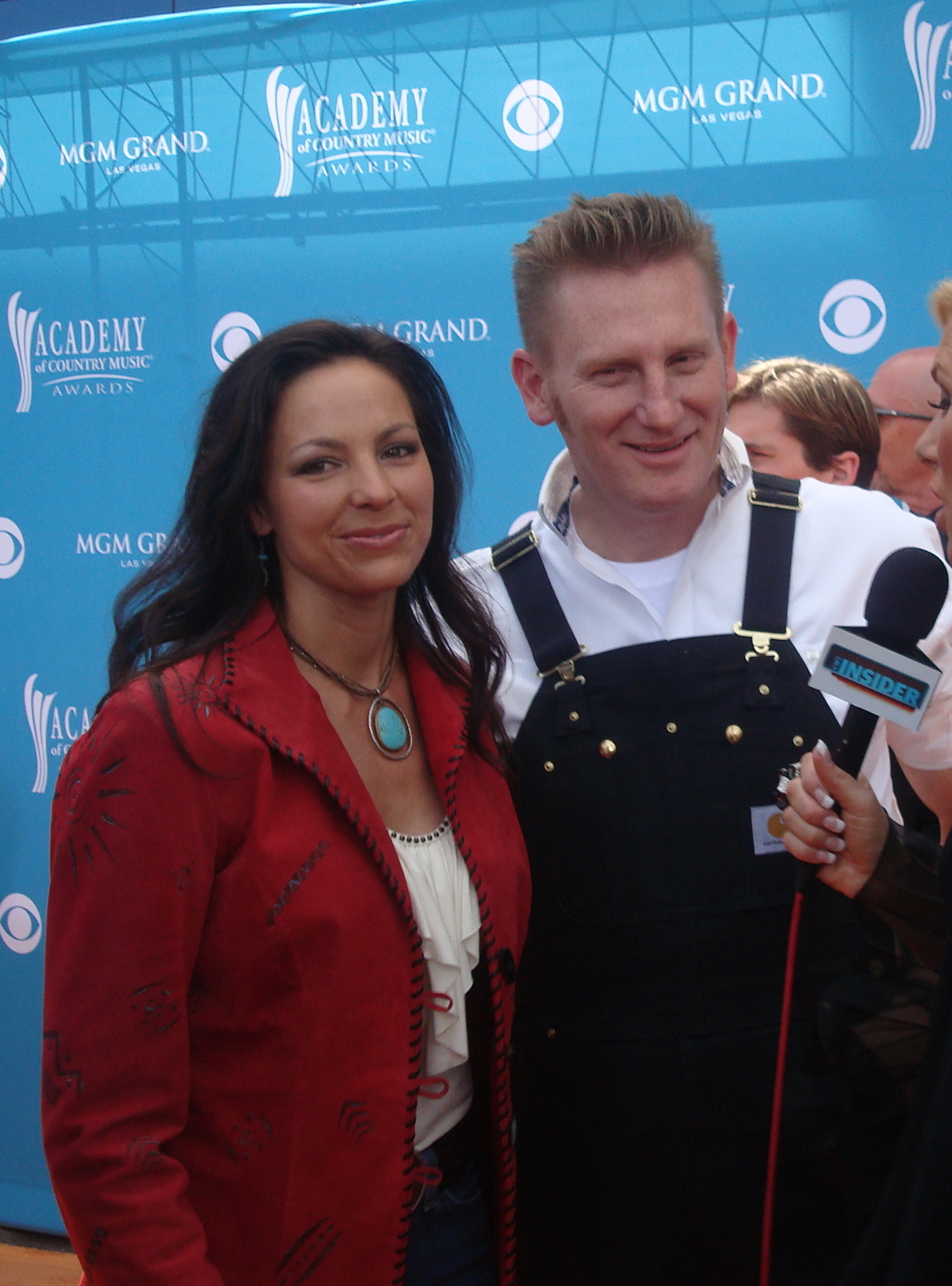
- Joey (left) and Rory Feek (right) in 2010

Background information
- Origin: Columbia, Tennessee, U.S.
- Genres: Country, bluegrass, Christian country
- Years active: 2008–2016
- Labels: Vanguard/Sugar Hill; Farmhouse; Gaither Music Group
- Past members: Joey Feek; Rory Feek
- Website: http://www.joeyandrory.com (as of March 3, 2016)

Joey + Rory was an American country and bluegrass duo from Columbia, Tennessee. The duo was composed of singer-songwriters Rory Feek (born April 25, 1965) and Joey Feek (September 9, 1975 – March 4, 2016), who were husband and wife. Both members of the duo were vocalists and songwriters, with Rory also playing acoustic guitar. Prior to the duo's foundation, Rory wrote singles for other artists. The duo recorded for Vanguard Records and Gaither Music Group and charted three singles on Hot Country Songs.

== History ==
Before the duo's foundation, Rory Lee Feek worked as a songwriter in Nashville, Tennessee, and continued to work as a songwriter as a member of Joey + Rory. Songs he wrote for other artists include Clay Walker's Top Five hit "The Chain of Love", Blake Shelton's Number One hit "Some Beach", Easton Corbin's "A Little More Country Than That", Blaine Larsen's 2005 hit, "How Do You Get That Lonely", and Jimmy Wayne's 2008 single "I Will". Rory also founded the independent label Giantslayer Records in 2004, on which Joey recorded a solo album entitled Strong Enough to Cry in 2005. This album was released in CD format and digital download in 2006. Rory also recorded a solo album on Giantslayer Records, titled My Ol' Man, which he made available only as a download.

Joey + Rory performed on the CMT competition Can You Duet in 2008, in which they were third-place finalists. Shortly after the competition, they were signed to the independent label Sugar Hill Records. They returned to the Can You Duet stage to perform "Cheater, Cheater" on "Original Song Night" for the series' second season, which aired on July 25, 2009.

=== 2008–2009: The Life of a Song ===
The duo's debut album, The Life of a Song, was released on October 28, 2008, on Sugar Hill Records. The album debuted at No. 10 on the Billboard Top Country Albums chart, and No. 61 on the all-genre Billboard 200. Its lead-off single, "Cheater, Cheater", was originally recorded by the duo Bomshel. Kristy Osmonson, one-half of that duo, co-wrote the song with the Feeks and Wynn Varble. Bomshel's version was released as a single in early 2008, although it did not chart. Joey + Rory's version was released in September 2008, featuring a music video that included a cameo from Naomi Judd, who had been a judge on Can You Duet. Joey + Rory's version peaked at No. 30 on the country music charts in early 2009. The duo has also appeared in television commercials for the online retailer Overstock.com in late 2008. In February 2009, the duo was nominated for the Academy of Country Music Awards Top Vocal Duo. Although a cover of Lynyrd Skynyrd's "Free Bird" was originally to have been released as the second single, it was withdrawn after two weeks, and replaced in March 2009 with "Play the Song", which failed to chart. The album's third single, "To Say Goodbye", was released to radio on July 27, 2009, debuting at number 54 as Billboard Magazine's "Hot Shot Debut" on the "Hot Country Songs" chart.

Joey + Rory released their first holiday single, the Carl Jackson-produced "It's Christmas Time," on November 16, 2009, to country radio and November 24, 2009, to digital retailers. The single was released in partnership with CMT One Country, which donated a portion of proceeds from the single to various charities (including The Second Harvest Food Bank of Middle Tennessee). Additionally, Rory Feek, along with Tim Johnson, created the Song Trust, under which an album of Christmas songs performed by children, titled Merry Kidsmas, was released.

=== 2010–2011: Album Number Two ===
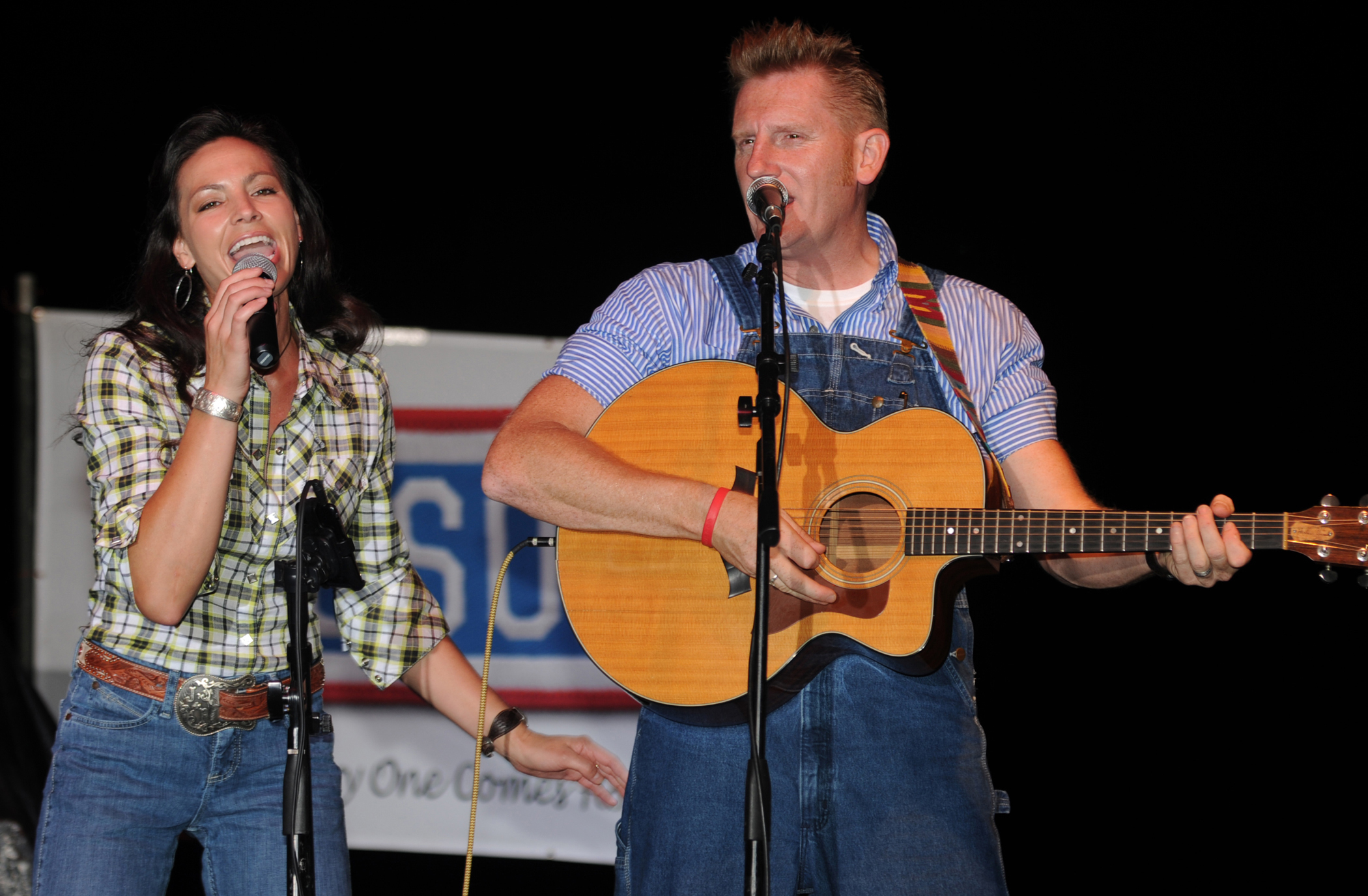
Joey + Rory (2010)

Joey + Rory announced on October 15, 2009, that they were in the studio working on the follow-up album to The Life of a Song. The album, titled Album Number Two, was announced in January 2010 and released on September 14, 2010. The lead-off single, "This Song's for You", was released to radio in July 2010; originally "That's Important to Me" had been chosen, but the single choice was changed. The music video for "This Song's for You" was directed by Darren Doane and was released in August 2010. "That's Important to Me" was released as the album's second single in October 2010. It debuted at number 58 on the Hot Country Songs chart for the week ending February 12, 2011.

On March 16, 2010, it was announced that the duo were the winners of the 2010 Academy of Country Music Award for Top New Vocal Duo, and would compete alongside Luke Bryan and Gloriana for the Top New Artist award. Joey + Rory performed new songs from their upcoming album, were interviewed, and received their award on the GAC special "ACM Top New Artists" on April 1, 2010.

=== 2011–2012: A Farmhouse Christmas and His and Hers ===
On August 29, 2011, Joey + Rory released a new single, titled "Headache," to country radio, though it failed to chart and was not included on an album. Joey + Rory released their first Christmas album, A Farmhouse Christmas, on October 11, 2011.

Joey + Rory's third studio album, His and Hers, was released on July 31, 2012. "When I'm Gone" and "Josephine" served as the album's first two singles and were simultaneously released to radio before the album, though neither charted. In late 2015, due to a spike in sales for "When I'm Gone" after the video was featured in some press about Joey + Rory, it managed to enter the Billboard Hot Country Songs chart at number 21.

=== 2013–2016: Final recordings ===
Joey + Rory announced on the red carpet of the ACM Awards that the duo had recorded their first album of gospel music. Joey Feek told Billboard that "It's kind of an inspirational album, of old gospel songs that I grew up singing and listening to my mom sing.... It’s an album I’ve wanted to do for a long, long time." The album, Inspired: Songs of Faith & Family, was released on July 16, 2013, via Gaither Music Group. It debuted at number 166 on the Billboard 200 with first-week sales of 3,000, while also peaking at number 31 on the Top Country Albums chart and at number 6 on the Top Christian Albums chart.

After the release of their Gospel album, Joey + Rory announced that they would be releasing their fifth studio album, Made to Last, in late 2013 via their own Farmhouse Recordings record label (their first self-released project). Made to Last was released on October 8, 2013, and debuted at No. 44 on the Top Country Albums chart. Their sixth studio album, Country Classics: A Tapestry of Our Musical Heritage, was released exclusively to Cracker Barrel in May 2014, with a wide release following on October 14, 2014. Their second project on Gaither Music Group, the record consists of cover versions of classic country songs.

Hymns That Are Important to Us, the duo's seventh and final studio album, was released on February 12, 2016, via Gaither Music Group. The set, which was a "dream project" for Joey Feek, consists of twelve covers of Christian hymns, plus a reprise of "When I'm Gone," which was first featured on the duo's His and Hers album in 2012. Some proceeds of the album's deluxe edition will go towards the Loeys-Dietz Syndrome Foundation, a charity selected by Joey Feek in honor of her daughter's friend who has Loeys-Dietz syndrome. Hymns That Are Important to Us debuted at the top of the Billboard Top Country Albums and Top Christian Albums charts, with first week sales of 68,000 copies, making it their highest-charting release and the duo's best sales week ever.

Rory Feek wrote and produced a film, Josephine, which was set in the American Civil War and included the couple's song of the same name. . It was shot at the Nathan Bedford Forrest Boyhood Home, the childhood home of Confederate General Nathan Bedford Forrest owned by the Sons of Confederate Veterans in Chapel Hill, Tennessee. The film later debuted at the Nashville Film Festival in summer 2016.

Joey was diagnosed with cervical cancer in late 2015 and died of the disease in March 2016.

== Discography ==
=== Studio albums ===
Title	Details	Peak chart positions					Certifications	Sales
Title	Details	US	US Country	US Indie	US Christ	CAN	Certifications	Sales
The Life of a Song	Release date: October 28, 2008; Label: Vanguard/Sugar Hill Records; Formats: CD, music download	61	10	—	—	—		
Album Number Two	Release date: September 14, 2010; Label: Vanguard/Sugar Hill Records; Formats: CD, vinyl LP, music download	60	9	11	—	—		
His and Hers	Release date: July 31, 2012; Label: Vanguard/Sugar Hill Records; Formats: CD, music download	112	24	19	—	—		
Inspired: Songs of Faith & Family	Release date: July 16, 2013; Label: Gaither Music Group; Formats: CD, music download	126	27	—	6	—		US: 45,000
Made to Last	Release date: October 8, 2013; Label: Farmhouse Recordings; Formats: CD, vinyl LP, music download	—	44	—	—	—		
Country Classics: A Tapestry of Our Musical Heritage	Release date: May 2014 (Cracker Barrel) October 27, 2014 (wide release); Label: Gaither Music Group; Formats: CD, music download	199	13	—	—	—		US: 44,700
Hymns That Are Important to Us	Release date: February 12, 2016; Label: Gaither Music Group; Formats: CD, music download	4	1	—	1	40	RIAA: Gold	US: 590,000
"—" denotes releases that did not chart

=== Holiday albums ===
Title	Details	Peak chart positions			Sales
Title	Details	US Country	US	US Holiday	Sales
A Farmhouse Christmas	Release date: October 11, 2011; Label: Vanguard/Sugar Hill Records; Formats: CD, music download	59	181	24	US: 52,500

=== Compilation albums ===
Title	Details	Peak chart positions			Sales
Title	Details	US Country	US	US Christ	Sales
The Album Collection	Release date: April 1, 2016; Label: Vanguard/Sugar Hill Records; Formats: CD, music download	10	192	—	US: 36,200
The Singer and the Song: The Best of Joey + Rory	Release date: September 21, 2018; Label: Gaither Music Group; Formats: CD, music download	—	—	9	US: 23,500
"—" denotes releases that did not chart

=== Singles ===
Year	Single	Peak positions			Sales	Album
Year	Single	US Country	US Bubbling	US Christ	Sales	Album
2008	"Cheater, Cheater"	30	23	—	US: Gold; US: 367,000	The Life of a Song
2009	"Play the Song"	—	—	—		The Life of a Song
2009	"To Say Goodbye"	—	—	—		The Life of a Song
2010	"This Song's for You" (with Zac Brown Band)	—	—	—		Album Number Two
2010	"That's Important to Me"	51	—	—	US: 36,000	Album Number Two
2011	"Headache"	—	—	—		—N/a
2012	"When I'm Gone"	21	10	—	US: 115,000	His and Hers
2012	"Josephine"	—	—	—		His and Hers
2016	"It Is Well with My Soul"	—	—	41		Hymns That Are Important to Us
"—" denotes releases that did not chart

=== Music videos ===
Year	Video	Director
2008	"Cheater, Cheater"	Peter Zavadil
2009	"Play the Song"	Peter Zavadil
2009	"It's Christmas Time"	Rory Feek
2010	"This Song's for You" (with Zac Brown Band)	Darren Doane/Steven Goldmann
2010	"That's Important to Me"	Alan Bunting/Deaton-Flanigen
2011	"Headache"	Bryan Allen/Steven Goldmann
2011	"Let It Snow (Somewhere Else)"	Rory Feek
2012	"When I'm Gone"	Deaton Flanigen
2012	"Josephine"	Gabe McCauley/Eric Welch
2013	"Gotta Go Back" (with Josh Turner)	Rory Feek/Gabe McCauley

== Awards and nominations ==
Year	Association	Category	Result
2009	Academy of Country Music Awards	Top Vocal Duo	Nominated
2009	Country Music Association Awards	Vocal Duo of the Year	Nominated
2010	Academy of Country Music Awards	Top New Vocal Duo of the Year	Won
2010	Academy of Country Music Awards	Top Vocal Duo of the Year	Nominated
2010	Academy of Country Music Awards	Top New Artist	Nominated
2010	Country Music Association Awards	Vocal Duo of the Year	Nominated
2011	Academy of Country Music Awards	Top Vocal Duo of the Year	Nominated
2011	Inspirational Country Music Awards	Vocal Duo	Won
2011	Inspirational Country Music Awards	Mainstream Inspirational Country Song – "That's Important to Me"	Nominated
2011	Inspirational Country Music Awards	Mainstream Country Artist	Nominated
2016	Grammy Awards	Best Country Duo/Group Performance – "If I Needed You"	Nominated
2016	Academy of Country Music Awards	Vocal Duo of the Year	Nominated
2017	Grammy Awards	Best Roots Gospel Album – Hymns That Are Important to Us	Won
