= The Chain of Love =

Single by Clay Walker

from the album Live, Laugh, Love
- Released: January 10, 2000
- Recorded: 1999
- Genre: Country
- Length: 5:04 (album version); 4:07 (radio edit)
- Label: Giant
- Songwriters: Rory Feek; Jonnie Barnett
- Producers: Doug Johnson; Clay Walker

Clay Walker singles chronology
"Live, Laugh, Love" (1999)	"The Chain of Love" (2000)	"Once in a Lifetime Love" (2000)

"The Chain of Love" is a song written by Rory Feek and Jonnie Barnett, and recorded by American country music singer Charlie Pride and then Clay Walker. It was released in January 2000 by Clay Walker as the third single from his album Live, Laugh, Love. "The Chain of Love" reached a peak of number 3 on the Billboard Hot Country Singles & Tracks (now Hot Country Songs) charts, providing Walker with his thirteenth Top Ten hit on that chart. It was also his second Top 40 hit on the Billboard Hot 100.

== Content ==
A mid-tempo song in the key of D Major, "The Chain of Love" centralizes on a series of characters who, by helping each other in some way, form a "chain of love" amongst them.

In the first verse, a male character named Joe (who is played by Walker in the music video) is driving home in an old dilapidated Pontiac, when he notices a lady whose Mercedes-Benz is stopped with a flat tire. He then stops and changes the tire for her, and after she asks how much she should pay him, he replies that she can repay him by continuing "the chain of love", as in, going on to help someone else, just as Joe has been helped by others in his past.

In the second verse, the lady has headed down the road to a small café. While eating there, she notices that the waitress is heavily pregnant and exhausted. After paying the waitress with a $100 bill, the lady leaves behind a note for the waitress on a napkin without accepting her change. Written on the napkin is the same request stated by Joe in the first chorus — an invitation to "continue the chain of love".

The waitress, by the third verse, has returned to her home. Joining her husband in bed, she begins to think of the money and the note left by the lady. It is then revealed that her husband is Joe, the same person who changed the tire for the lady ("Everything's gonna be all right / I love you, Joe.").

== Critical reception ==
Walker told The Dallas Morning News, "I was in Denver the other day, got off an airplane, got on the bus and went to a restaurant. This guy, about 6-foot-6, walked up to us and told us at the table, "This song is the only song that ever made me cry.' He said, "I wouldn't just say that to anybody.' Then he turned around and walked off, never said another word, didn't ask for an autograph, nothing else. He just wanted to share his story." Walker also revealed the song was not intended to be a single and said, "Sometimes the cream rises to the top. This song was a sleeper. It's just one of those shockers where people come out of the woods to talk about it. It's pretty special when you touch people like that." In another interview Walker said, "It's just great story song, where the ending takes you by surprise. It still gives me chills."

Music critic Pat McDonald of The Seattle Times, in his review of Walker's album, described the song as being "a story song so sickly sweet and unlikely, it comes off like an episode of Touched by an Angel." Brian Wahlert of Country Standard Time said that the song was a "heartwarming story" and one of the stronger tracks on the album. Phyllis Stark of Billboard listed "The Chain of Love" as the tenth best country single of 2000.

== Music video ==
The music video for this song features Walker singing at an abandoned drive-in theater. The music video was directed by Michael Cargile and was filmed in Houston, Texas. The music video was nominated for Video of the Year at the 2000 Christian Country Music Awards.

== Chart performance ==
This song entered the Hot Country Singles & Tracks chart at number 74 in late 1999 as an album cut. It was officially released as a single in early 2000, and re-entered the country chart at number 68 on the chart dated January 15, 2000. It charted for 34 weeks on that chart, and quickly climbed to number 3 on the chart dated May 27, 2000, where it held for two weeks, before falling to number 4 afterwards. The next week, the song climbed back to number 3 for two more weeks and then fell. It also peaked at number 40 on the Billboard Hot 100.

=== Charts ===
Chart (2000)	Peak position
Canada Country Singles (RPM)	6
US Billboard Hot 100	40
US Hot Country Songs (Billboard)	3

=== Year-end charts ===
Chart (2000)	Rank
U.S. Billboard Hot Country Songs	19

== Trivia ==
In the vintage 1947 "Touring" automobile card game from Parker Brothers, the man rolling a punctured tire into a garage to be fixed has a uniform with the name "Joe".
