= Joey Feek =

American country singer (1975–2016)

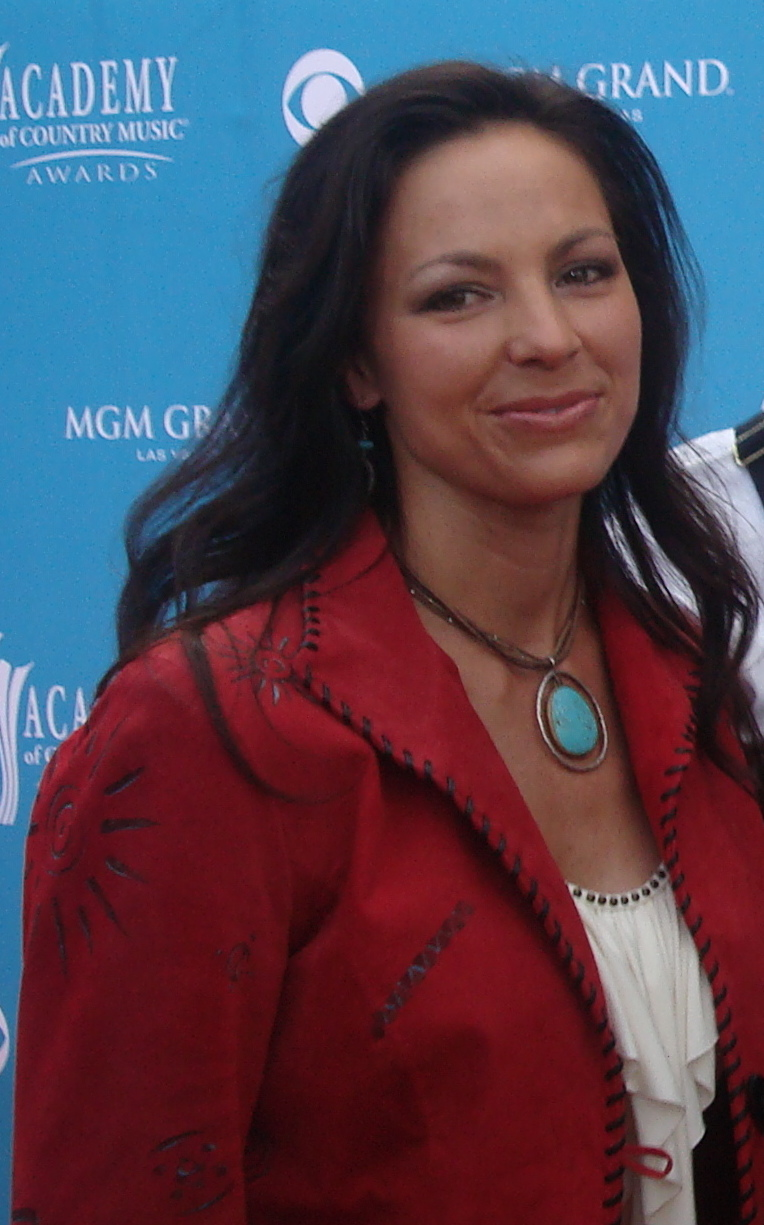
- Feek at the 45th Academy of Country Music Awards in 2010
- Born: Joey Marie Martin; September 9, 1975; Alexandria, Indiana, U.S.
- Died: March 4, 2016 (aged 40); Alexandria, Indiana, U.S.
- Resting place: Feek Family Farm Cemetery; Lewisburg, Tennessee, U.S.
- Occupation: Singer-songwriter
- Spouse: Rory Feek (m. 2002)
- Children: 1
- Relatives: Heidi Feek (stepdaughter)
- Musical career
- Genres: Country, Christian country
- Instrument: Vocals
- Years active: 2008–2016
- Formerly of: Joey + Rory
- Website: Joey + Rory website (Archived - March 3, 2016)

Joey Marie Feek (née Martin, September 9, 1975 – March 4, 2016) was an American country music singer and songwriter. From 2008 to 2016, the duo Joey + Rory comprised her and her husband, Rory Feek.

== Life and musical career ==
Joey Marie Feek was born Joey Marie Martin on September 9, 1975, in Alexandria, Indiana, to Jack and June Martin. She was the fourth of five children: three sisters (Jody, Julie, Jessie) and one younger brother, Justin, who in 1994 died in a car accident. Her father, who played guitar, encouraged her to start singing and performing at an early age. She moved to Nashville, Tennessee in 1998 to pursue a career as an assistant at a horse vet clinic, and established connections with LeAnn Rimes' father Wilbur, and Kix Brooks of Brooks & Dunn. At a songwriter night, she met songwriter Rory Lee Feek, whom she married in June 2002. She sang backing vocals on Blaine Larsen's 2004 album Off to Join the World, which her husband co-produced. Joey was signed to Sony Nashville and recorded an unreleased solo album in 2005 titled Strong Enough to Cry, but due to change in management and restructuring at Sony, the planned major label release for her album was shelved. The album, retitled If Not For You, was eventually released by Farmhouse Recordings on April 7, 2017.

In 2008, a friend suggested that Joey and Rory try out for Can You Duet, a talent show airing on CMT with the purpose of finding the next great country duo. They made an audition tape and came up with the name "Joey + Rory," and finished in third place on Can You Duet. The duo were signed to Sugar Hill/Vanguard Records, who released their first three studio albums. The duo released eight albums overall and charted a Top 30 Hot Country Songs hit with "Cheater, Cheater".

Expecting a baby in early 2014, the couple decided to spend the year at home. Their daughter, Indiana Boone, was born on February 17, 2014, with Down syndrome.

A few months later in May 2014, Joey was diagnosed with cervical cancer. After surgery and treatment, she was declared cancer free and did not receive any radiation or chemotherapy.

== Cancer relapse ==
In June 2015, after the family had finished filming their movie Josephine, Feek was not feeling well again and sought medical advice. After undergoing further medical testing, it was discovered that the cervical cancer had returned and metastasized to her colon. In July 2015, Feek underwent a second surgery to remove a 3-inch tumor (recurrence of cervical cancer) that had invaded her colon and surrounding structures. The surgery was long and involved and required the use of inter-operative radiation as there were tumors the surgeon could not get clear margins on. Still, the medical team was hopeful for Feek's situation, and she recovered from surgery to continue on to endure an intense round of radiation and chemotherapy in the summer of 2015. While undergoing treatment at Cancer Treatment Centers of America, she would record hymns in their hotel room for the last CD the couple would create together, Hymns That Are Important to Us.

In October 2015, Rory revealed in a blog post that Joey's cancer was terminal, and they were stopping all treatment as the chemotherapy and radiation she had suffered through for the last few months were not working. The MRI "scans revealed that two quarter-sized tumors had already grown back in the same area that they had been blasting daily with chemo and radiation [and] that many more smaller tumors were visible all throughout the abdominal region. She said that the cancer was aggressively spreading". There were no more treatment options available and all there was left to do was keep Joey as comfortable as possible for the time she had left.

By November 2015, Feek was in hospice care. In January 2016, her morphine dose needed to keep the cancer pain under control had quadrupled. She was able to celebrate Indiana's second birthday and Valentine's Day with her and Rory, see them receive a Grammy nomination for the song "If I Needed You", and see and hear the final recording the duo would make together, an album of hymns that she had always wanted to make that debuted at number 8 on the Billboard 200 when it was released, and peaked at number 4 on the Billboard 200 three weeks after its release. She died on March 4, 2016, and Rory held a private funeral on their farm in Tennessee; Joey was buried in the family cemetery on the Feek farm.

== Discography ==
=== Studio albums ===
Title	Details	Peak chart positions		Sales
Title	Details	US Country	US	Sales
If Not For You	Release date: April 7, 2017; Label: Farmhouse Recordings; Formats: CD, music download	6	50	US: 69,000
