= Hymns That Are Important to Us =

Studio album by Joey + Rory
- Released: February 12, 2016
- Recorded: August 2015
- Studios: Nashville and Atlanta.
- Genre: Christian country
- Length: 41:47
- Label: Gaither
- Producers: Rory Lee Feek; Joe West

Joey + Rory chronology
Country Classics: A Tapestry of Our Musical Heritage (2014)	Hymns That Are Important to Us (2016)

Hymns That Are Important to Us is the eighth and final studio album by Joey + Rory. Gaither Music Group released the album on February 12, 2016. It won the Grammy Award for Best Roots Gospel Album in 2017.

== Background ==
The set, which was a "dream project" for Joey Feek, consists of twelve covers of religious hymns, plus a reprise of "When I'm Gone," which was first featured on the duo's His and Hers album in 2012. Some proceeds of the album's deluxe edition will go towards the Loeys-Dietz Syndrome Foundation, a charity selected by Joey Feek in honor of her daughter's friend who has Loeys-Dietz syndrome.

== Critical reception ==
Professional ratings
Review scores
Source	Rating
CCM Magazine	4.5/5 stars
Digital Journal	5/5 stars
Today's Christian Entertainment	4.5/5 stars

Awarding the album four and a half stars at CCM Magazine, Matt Conner writes, "In what they knew would be their final musical release, Joey + Rory have made another inspiring and courageous statement with Hymns That Are Important to Us." Kelly Meade, giving the album four and a half stars from Today's Christian Entertainment, states, "As you listen to this album, you can hear the honest, joyful spirit in Joey’s voice as she sings these familiar favorites. Rory lends supportive harmonies that complement his wife’s heartfelt tone. The music is beautifully arranged allowing these timeless classics to shine." Giving the album five stars from Digital Journal, Markos Papadatos describes, "it is absolutely fantastic from start to finish...Joey and Rory are excellent on their latest studio album, Hymns. They manage to make a superb connection with the hearts of their listeners."

Reviewing the album for Milwaukee Journal Sentinel, Erik Ernst says, "In a transition that often makes us wallow in the grief of loss, Joey Feek instead offers hope as a lasting gift for those she will likely soon leave behind." Andrew Greenhalgh, penning a review at Soul-Audio, describes, "Joey + Rory’s Hymns That Are Important To Us is a powerhouse of a listen that tells a heartfelt story. And while this story is unique to Joey and Rory, it’s ultimately one that resonates with us all, exploring pain, loss, fear head on and finding hope, grace, and forgiveness in the faith of Christ. It’s alternately humble and hard hitting and is well worth listening to time and time again." Writing a review from Hallels, Timothy Yap concludes, "This album is not just important to the Feeks, but they are important to us too."

== Commercial performance ==
Hymns That Are Important to Us debuted at number one on the Top Country Albums and Top Christian Albums charts and number four on the Billboard 200, with first week sales of 68,000 copies, making the album Joey + Rory's highest-charting effort and best sales week to date. In its second week, the album dropped to number two on the country album chart and sold an additional 37,000 copies. It again topped the Country Albums chart in its fourth week, with 44,000 copies sold, with over 180,000 copies sold in the US. The album has sold 590,000 copies in the US as of November 2017.

== Track listing ==
No.	Title	Writer(s)	Length
1.	"Take My Hand, Precious Lord"	Thomas A. Dorsey	2:54
2.	"I Surrender All"	Winfield Weeden; Judson W. Van DeVenter	3:07
3.	"He Touched Me"	William Gaither	3:20
4.	"Softly and Tenderly"	Will Lamartine Thompson	2:41
5.	"Jesus Loves Me"	William Batchelder Bradbury; Anna Bartlett Warner	2:26
6.	"It Is Well with My Soul"	Philip Bliss; Horatio Gates Spafford	3:15
7.	"The Old Rugged Cross"	George Bennard	2:46
8.	"I Need Thee Every Hour"	Robert Lowry; Annie Sherwood Hawks	3:27
9.	"How Great Thou Art"	Carl Boberg; Stuart K. Hine	3:38
10.	"I'll Fly Away"	Albert Edward Brumley	3:56
11.	"Jesus Paid It All"	Elvina Mable Hall; John Grape	3:16
12.	"Suppertime"	Ira Forest Stanphill	3:06
13.	"When I'm Gone" (Bonus Track)	Sandy Emory Lawrence	3:55
Total length:			41:47

== Chart performance ==
=== Weekly charts ===
Chart (2016)	Peak position
Canadian Albums (Billboard)	40
US Billboard 200	4
US Top Christian Albums (Billboard)	1
US Top Country Albums (Billboard)	1

=== Year-end charts ===
Chart (2016)	Position
US Billboard 200	54
US Top Christian Albums (Billboard)	1
US Top Country Albums (Billboard)	2

Chart (2017)	Position
US Top Christian Albums (Billboard)	13
US Top Country Albums (Billboard)	86
US Top Current Album (Billboard)	190

=== Decade-end charts ===
Chart (2010s)	Position
US Christian Albums (Billboard)	33
