= Blaine Larsen =

American singer-songwriter

- Born: February 2, 1986 (age 39); Tacoma, Washington, U.S.
- Genres: Country
- Occupation: Singer-songwriter
- Instrument(s): Vocals, guitar
- Years active: 2004–present
- Labels: Giantslayer; BNA; Treehouse/Stroudavarious

Blaine Larsen (born February 2, 1986) is an American country music artist. He was raised in Buckley, Washington. At age fifteen, he recorded his debut album In My High School on Giantslayer Records, an independent record label. The album was re-issued in 2005 as Off to Join the World by BNA Records. Blaine's second album, Rockin' You Tonight, was issued in June 2006, also on BNA. Larsen's two albums for that label have produced five chart singles on the Hot Country Songs charts, of which the highest-peaking was "How Do You Get That Lonely" at number 18. Larsen left BNA in 2009, in favor of Treehouse Records and consequently with Stroudavarious Records, but is now unsigned.

== Career ==
Larsen was introduced to music very early. By age 10, Larsen had begun singing along to country karaoke tapes, and by age 13 he learned to play guitar as well. When Larsen was a junior in high school, he and his family made a trip to Nashville, Tennessee, where Larsen recorded a demo CD composed mainly of cover songs. This CD also included a song that he had co-written with his school teacher. Nashville songwriters Rory Lee Feek and Tim Johnson discovered Larsen's demo CD. They then flew him back Nashville again to hold a recording session with him, and by 2004, his debut album In My High School was released on Feek and Johnson's label, Giantslayer Records. The album's lead-off single, which was the title track, received some airplay particularly in Seattle also reaching 60 on the country charts that year.

After "In My High School" began receiving airplay, Sandy Conklin, an employee at BMG in Seattle sent a note to Joe Galante, head of the BMG labels in Nashville, recommending Larsen. Galante auditioned him and agreed to sign him at the end of 2004. Larsen was signed to BMG-affiliated BNA Records label. BNA then added a bonus track to In My High School, re-releasing the album in early 2005 under the title Off to Join the World. Larsen had co-written six of the ten songs on the album. BNA also released two more singles from the album: "How Do You Get That Lonely", which peaked at number 18. It was followed by "The Best Man" at number 36.

In 2006, Larsen released his second studio album, also a joint effort between BNA and Giantslayer. Entitled Rockin' You Tonight, this album produced two more chart singles for Larsen: the 24 "I Don't Know What She Said" and the 42 "Spoken Like a Man". The former was co-written by Warner Bros. Records artist Lane Turner. Rockin' You Tonight also included covers of Mac Davis "Baby, Don't Get Hooked on Me" and Mark Chesnutt's "I'm in Love with a Married Woman", as well as a duet with Gretchen Wilson entitled "Lips of a Bottle". He also recorded separately a cover of "I Wish That I Could Fall in Love Today" on a tribute album to Barbara Mandrell. He also toured with renowned artists opening for their shows, including Brad Paisley, Rascal Flatts and Kenny Chesney. He charted with a cover of "Away in a Manger", and also co-wrote the track "I Gotta Get to You" on George Strait's album Twang.

Larsen exited BNA in 2008, and signed to Treehouse Records, a label founded by his management company, in June 2009. He was the first artist to sign for the label. After one year of operations, Treehouse Records merged in Stroudavarious Records. Larsen's next album Not Too Bad was tipped to be under the new label. A lead-off single from the prospective album, entitled "It Did," made its chart debut in August 2009. It was followed by "Chillin'" (a minor Top 40 hit) and "Leavin'," but the album was eventually shelved after Stroudavarious folded into J&R Records without signing Larsen.

== Personal life ==
Larsen was born in Tacoma, Washington. When he was five years old, his parents divorced; he, his mother Jenny, and his sister Lindsey then moved to Buckley, Washington. His father often promised to visit or call, but he never did. A family friend named Woody who worked side jobs as a contractor took Blaine Larsen with him on weekend jobs. One of those jobs, converting Larsen's grandmother's garage into a living space, led to romance between Woody and Blaine's mother Jenny. They later married, and Woody legally adopted Larsen just before he turned 18. Larsen wrote the autobiographical song "The Best Man" about his own family.

Larsen married Sammie in December 2005. They had their first daughter Zoe in April 2008. They had their second child, a son they named Noble in April 2011.

Larsen became an ambassador for Compassion International and in 2010 went to a one-week trip with the organization to Colombia, also sponsoring one of the Colombian kids he met during his mission.

== Discography ==
=== Studio albums ===
Title	Album details	Peak chart positions	
Title	Album details	US Country	US
In My High School	Release date: June 1, 2004; Label: Giantslayer Records	—	—
Off to Join the World	Release date: January 25, 2005; Label: BNA Records	14	79
Rockin' You Tonight	Release date: June 13, 2006; Label: BNA Records	23	93
"—" denotes releases that did not chart

=== Singles ===
Year	Single	Peak chart positions		Album
Year	Single	US Country	US	Album
2004	"In My High School"	60	—	In My High School
2005	"How Do You Get That Lonely"	18	91	Off to Join the World
2005	"The Best Man"	36	—	Off to Join the World
2006	"I Don't Know What She Said"	24	—	Rockin' You Tonight
2006	"Spoken Like a Man"	42	—	Rockin' You Tonight
2009	"It Did"	50	—	Not Too Bad (unreleased)
2010	"Chillin'"	38	—	Not Too Bad (unreleased)
2010	"Leavin'"	47	—	Not Too Bad (unreleased)
2015	"Missing the Rain"	—	—	—
2016	"Cactus in a Coffee Can" (featuring Hillary McBride)	—	—	—
2016	"When I Grow Up (I Wanna Be a Kid Again)"	—	—	—
"—" denotes releases that did not chart

=== Other charted songs ===
Year	Single	Peak chart positions	Album
Year	Single	US Country	Album
2008	"Away in a Manger"	53	Hear Something Country Christmas

=== Music videos ===
Year	Video	Director
2004	"In My High School"	
2004	"How Do You Get That Lonely" (1st version)	
2005	"How Do You Get That Lonely" (2nd version)	Deaton-Flanigen Productions
2006	"The Best Man"	
2009	"It Did"	
