= Tim Johnson (songwriter) =

American songwriter (1960–2012)

- Born: Timothy Jon Johnson; January 27, 1960; Noti, Oregon, U.S.
- Origin: Nashville, Tennessee, U.S.
- Died: October 21, 2012 (aged 52) Nashville, Tennessee, U.S.
- Genres: Country
- Occupation: Songwriter
- Years active: 1995–2012

Timothy Jon Johnson (January 29, 1960 – October 21, 2012) was an American country music songwriter. Johnson is known for writing the singles "I Let Her Lie" by Daryle Singletary, "God Only Cries" by Diamond Rio, "Do You Believe Me Now" by Jimmy Wayne, "Things That Never Cross a Man's Mind" by Kellie Pickler, "She Misses Him" by Tim Rushlow, "This Heartache Never Sleeps" by Mark Chesnutt, "That's Important To Me" by Joey + Rory among many others. Johnson was known as a songwriter's songwriter and penned many hits alone as well as collaborating with other talented writers.

Johnson is also known for his collaborations with Rory Lee Feek of Joey + Rory, with whom he founded an organization called the Song Trust, in which works by new artists were all credited to that name. Song Trust's first release was "Bring Him Home Santa" in 2008. He was also on the board of the Nashville Songwriters Association International, and co-produced the first two albums by Blaine Larsen. Johnson and Feek also owned the Giantslayer Records label.

Johnson was the co-founder of Songwriter Institute which connected hit songwriters with amateur songwriters by way of retreats and private appointments. In this venture, Johnson produced the educational video Pro vs Am with fellow hit songwriter Clay Mills.

Born in Noti, Oregon, Johnson grew up elk hunting in the shadows of the Cascade Mountains, and attended Willamette University located in Salem, Oregon before transferring and graduating from the University of Oregon. Before moving to Nashville to pursue songwriting, Johnson spent five years in Japan teaching English as a foreign language. Until his death in October 2012, Johnson resided with his wife Megan Green Johnson and two children in Franklin, Tennessee.
