= Rory Feek =

American singer-songwriter (born 1965)

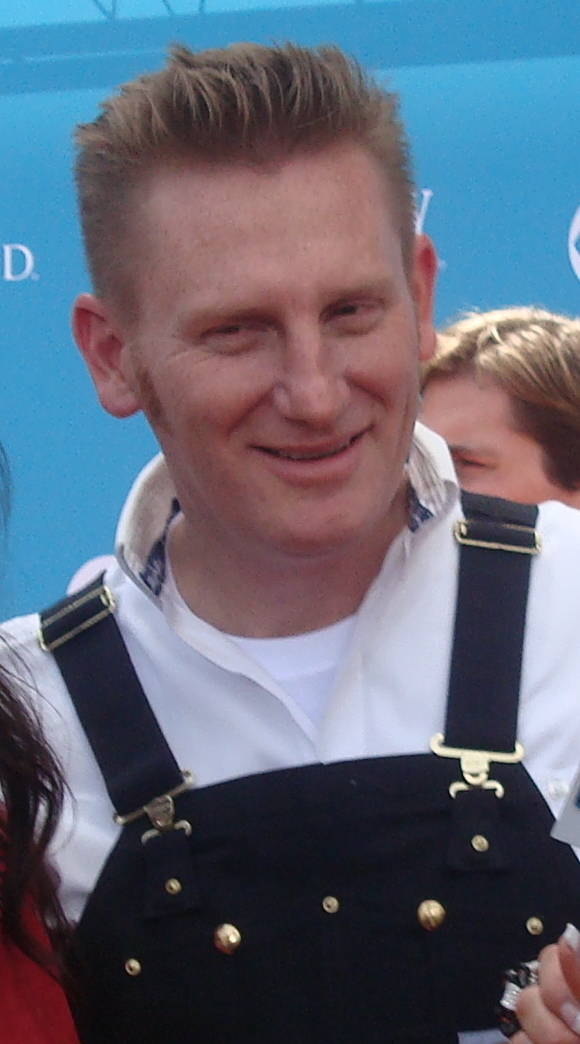
- Feek at the 45th Academy of Country Music Awards in 2010
- Born: April 25, 1965 (age 61); Atchison, Kansas, U.S.
- Occupation: Singer-songwriter
- Years active: 1996–present (songwriter) 2008–2016, 2020–present (singer)
- Musical career
- Genres: Country
- Instrument: Vocals
- Label: Sugar Hill/Vanguard (in Joey + Rory)
- Formerly of: Joey + Rory
- Spouses: Tamara Gilmer (m. 1985; div. 1992) Joey Martin (m. 2002; died 2016) Rebecca (m. 2024)

Rory Lee Feek (born April 25, 1965) is an American country music singer and songwriter. In his career, he has written singles for Clay Walker, Blake Shelton, Tracy Byrd and other artists. He and his wife, Joey Feek, formed the duo Joey + Rory and was placed third on the first season of the CMT talent show Can You Duet. He also established Giantslayer Records for launching of new independent artists.

== Personal life ==
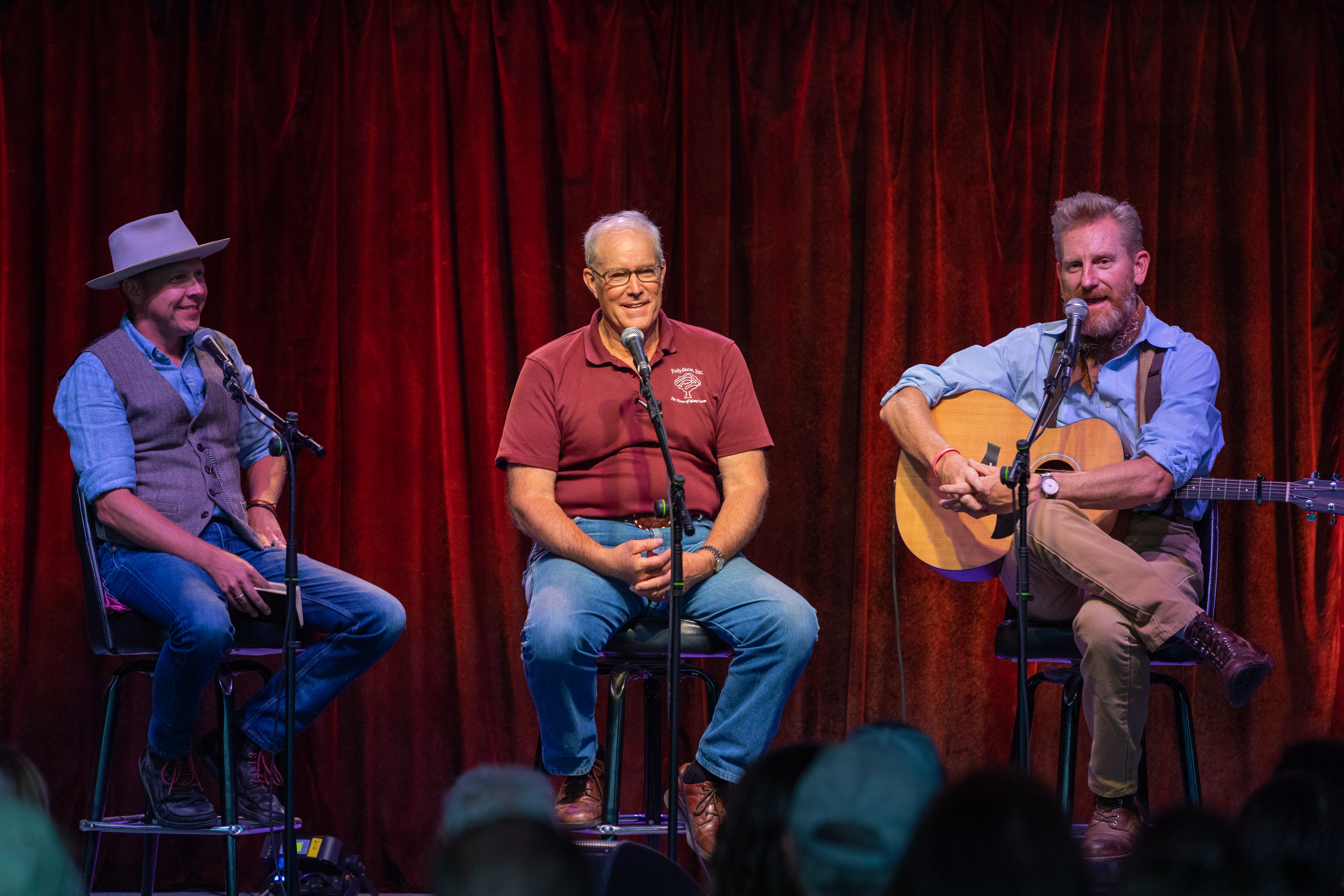
Feek on stage with Gabe Mccauley and Joel Salatin at the Music Ranch Montana on July 10, 2021

Rory Lee Feek was born and raised in Atchison, Kansas. In his blog, ThisLifeILive.com, he gives his birth year as 1965. Feek married Tamara Gilmer on August 3, 1985, and they divorced March 25, 1992. In 2002, he married Joey Feek, with whom he started the duo Joey + Rory. They have one daughter, Indiana Boone (born February 17, 2014), who was born with Down syndrome. Feek also has two older daughters, Heidi Feek (born 1986) and Hopie Feek (born 1988), from his previous marriage. Joey died of metastatic cervical cancer on March 4, 2016.

Feek has a friendship and working relationship with Joel F. Salatin with whom he has collaborated in several performances promoting sustainable farming. Feek hosted a series of discussions on sustainable farming in 2020 and again in 2021 in an event billed as "Songs, Stories & Sustainability with Joel Salatin and Rory Feek" at the Music Ranch Montana. On Feek's property outside of Nashville, he has a farm, a concert hall and school house.

Eight years following the death of Joey, Feek married Rebecca on July 14, 2024 in Greycliff, Montana.

== Career ==
Inspired by Don Williams, Merle Haggard, and other artists, Feek began playing guitar at age 15. He later served two tours of duty in the United States Marine Corps after high school, before moving to Dallas, Texas, where he played in nightclubs. Feek moved to Nashville, Tennessee, in 1995 after being encouraged by Nashville entertainment attorney Rod Phelps, and signed to a publishing contract. One of his first single releases as a songwriter was Collin Raye's "Someone You Used to Know," a Top Five country hit in 1999. A year later, Clay Walker reached Top Five as well with "The Chain of Love," another song that Feek co-wrote.

Feek continued to write for other artists in the 2000s, including album tracks for Mark Wills, Kenny Chesney, Terri Clark, Randy Travis, and Lorrie Morgan, as well as Tracy Byrd's 2003 single "The Truth About Men" In 2004, Feek achieved his first Number One as a songwriter when Blake Shelton topped the country charts with "Some Beach," which he co-wrote with Paul Overstreet. Also in 2004, Feek founded the Giantslayer Records label, on which Blaine Larsen recorded two studio albums in association with BNA Records.

In 2008, Feek and his wife Joey founded a duo called Joey + Rory. They came in third place on the CMT talent show Can You Duet, and later that year signed to a recording contract with Vanguard Records. Joey + Rory released their debut single "Cheater, Cheater" that year, and peaked at No. 30 on the country singles charts with it. That same year, Jimmy Wayne charted on the country charts with "I Will," another Feek co-write.

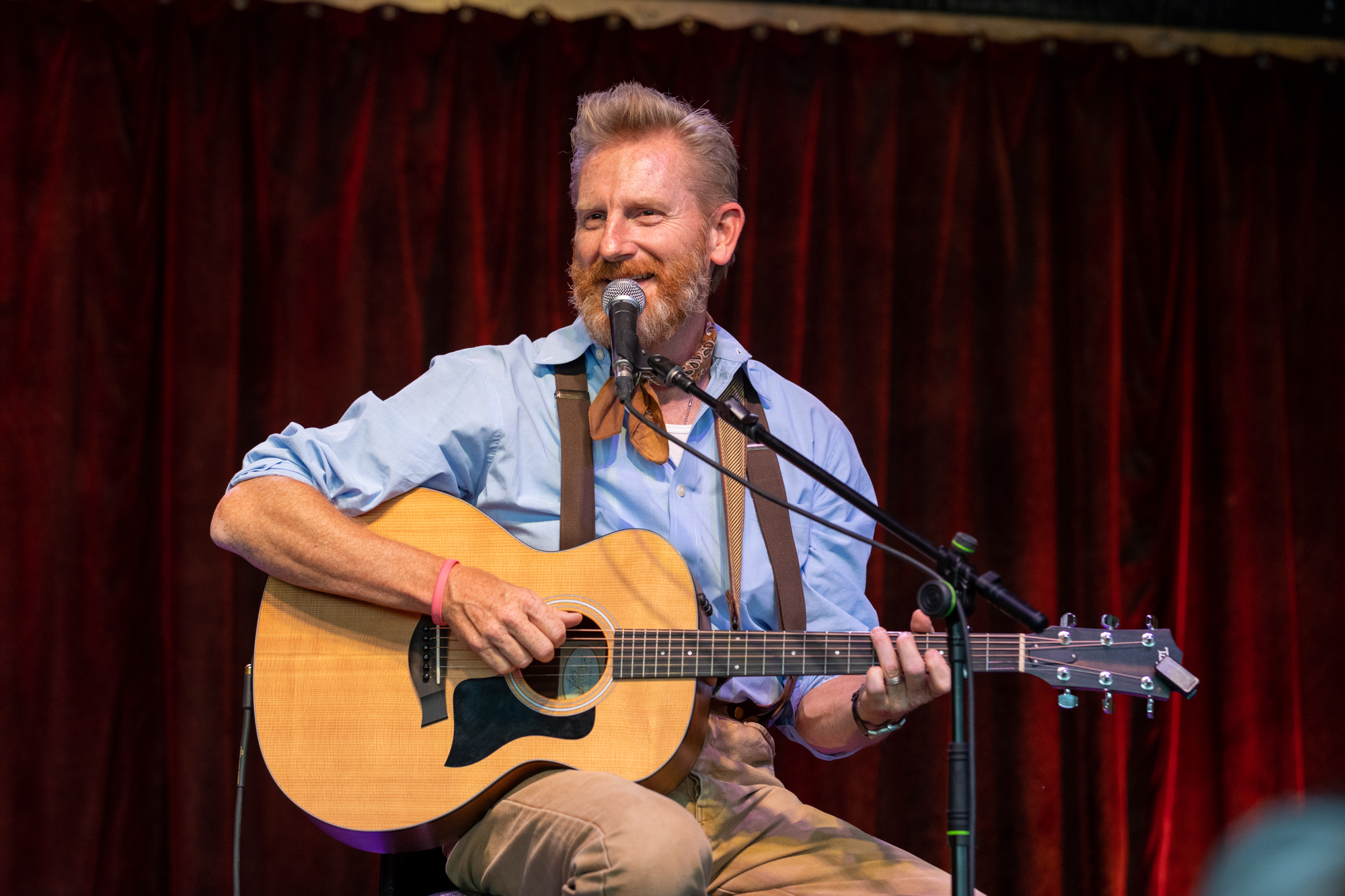
Feek at the Music Ranch Montana in July 2021

Rory’s first solo album "Gentle Man" was released on June 18, 2021. It is the first album recorded since losing his wife and country music collaborator Joey to cancer in 2016. The album includes Feek and Jamie Teachenor's co-written single “Met Him in a Motel Room” with vocals by Trisha Yearwood. Yearwood previously recorded the song for her 2014 album, "PrizeFighter: Hit After Hit." The album also includes a cover of Bob Dylan’s “The Times They Are A-Changin.’”

As a filmmaker and storyteller, Feek wrote, shot much of, and edited his docu-series, This Life I Live, which premiered on RFD-TV in March 2020. Feek created the singer-songwriter show "Muletown In the Round," the educational series, "The One Room Schoolhouse," and others with Red King Productions. He also made the feature-length film Finding Josephine (2019), the full-length documentary To Joey, With Love (2016), music videos for the album "Gentle Man," and dozens of music videos over his career as a musician and songwriter.

As an author, Feek has written two memoirs and several children's books. His 2017 memoir, "This Life I Live: One Man's Extraordinary, Ordinary Life and the Woman Who Changed It Forever" (HarperCollins) hit top book lists including the Wall Street Journal, Publishers Weekly, the New York Times, the Washington Post, and USA Today. Additional books include "Once Upon a Farm" (HarperCollins), "The Cow Said Neigh!" (HarperCollins), "The Day God Made You" (HarperCollins), and "The Little Rooster" (Milk Barn Kids).
