= Greatest Hits Volume Two (George Strait album) =

Greatest hits album by George Strait
- Released: September 7, 1987
- Recorded: 1984–87
- Genre: Country
- Length: 30:35
- Label: MCA Records; MCAD-42035
- Producer: Jimmy Bowen; George Strait

George Strait chronology
Ocean Front Property (1987)	Greatest Hits Volume Two (1987)	If You Ain't Lovin' You Ain't Livin' (1988)

Professional ratings
Review scores
Source	Rating
Allmusic	5/5 stars
Robert Christgau	B

Greatest Hits Volume Two is the second compilation album by American country music artist George Strait, released on September 7, 1987 by MCA Records. It features all of Strait's singles from 1984–87. It reached No. 1 on the Billboard Top Country Albums Chart and is certified triple platinum by the RIAA.

== Track listing ==
No.	Title	Writer(s)	Length
1.	"Does Fort Worth Ever Cross Your Mind"	Sanger D. Shafer, Darlene Shafer	3:15
2.	"The Cowboy Rides Away"	Sonny Throckmorton, Casey Kelly	3:21
3.	"The Fireman"	Mack Vickery, Wayne Kemp	2:33
4.	"The Chair"	Hank Cochran, Dean Dillon	2:50
5.	"You're Something Special to Me"	David Anthony	3:18
6.	"Nobody in His Right Mind Would've Left Her"	Dillon	2:52
7.	"It Ain't Cool to Be Crazy About You"	Dillon, Royce Porter	2:52
8.	"Ocean Front Property"	Dillon, Cochran, Porter	3:08
9.	"All My Ex's Live in Texas"	S. Shafer, Lydia J. Shafer	3:20
10.	"Am I Blue"	David Chamberlain	3:06
Total length:			30:35

== Charts ==
=== Weekly charts ===
Chart (1987)	Peak position
US Billboard 200	68
US Top Country Albums (Billboard)	1

=== Year-end charts ===
Chart (1988)	Position
US Top Country Albums (Billboard)	5
Chart (1989)	Position
US Top Country Albums (Billboard)	39
Chart (1990)	Position
US Top Country Albums (Billboard)	44
Chart (1991)	Position
US Top Country Albums (Billboard)	73

== Certifications ==
Certifications for Greatest Hits Volume Two
Region	Certification	Certified units/sales
United States (RIAA)	3× Platinum	3,000,000^{^}
^{^} Shipments figures based on certification alone.
