= Greatest Hits (George Strait album) =

Greatest hits album by George Strait
- Released: March 4, 1985
- Recorded: February 1981 – July 1983
- Genre: Neotraditional country
- Length: 27:33
- Label: MCA Records
- Producers: Blake Mevis (tracks 1–7); Ray Baker (tracks 8–10)

George Strait chronology
Does Fort Worth Ever Cross Your Mind (1984)	Greatest Hits (1985)	Something Special (1985)

Professional ratings
Review scores
Source	Rating
Allmusic	5/5 stars
Robert Christgau	A−

Greatest Hits is the first compilation album by American country music artist George Strait, released on March 4, 1985, by MCA Records. It includes all ten singles from Strait's first three albums. It reached No. 4 on the Billboard Top Country Albums chart and had been certified 4× multi-Platinum by the RIAA.

== Track listing ==
No.	Title	Writer(s)	Length
1.	"Unwound"	Dean Dillon, Frank Dycus	2:24
2.	"Down and Out"	Dillon, Dycus	2:24
3.	"If You're Thinking You Want a Stranger (There's One Coming Home)"	Blake Mevis, David Wills	2:58
4.	"Fool Hearted Memory"	Mevis, Byron Hill	2:39
5.	"Marina del Rey"	Dillon, Dycus	3:03
6.	"Amarillo by Morning"	Paul Fraser, Terry Stafford	2:52
7.	"A Fire I Can't Put Out"	Darrell Staedtler	3:00
8.	"You Look So Good in Love"	Glen Ballard, Rory Bourke, Kerry Chater	3:13
9.	"Right or Wrong"	Paul Biese, Haven Gillespie, Arthur Sizemore	2:05
10.	"Let's Fall to Pieces Together"	Dickey Lee, Tommy Rocco, Johnny Russell	2:55

== Charts ==
=== Weekly charts ===
Chart (1985)	Peak position
US Billboard 200	157
US Top Country Albums (Billboard)	4

=== Year-end charts ===
Chart (1985)	Position
US Top Country Albums (Billboard)	11
Chart (1986)	Position
US Top Country Albums (Billboard)	21
Chart (1987)	Position
US Top Country Albums (Billboard)	25
Chart (1990)	Position
US Top Country Albums (Billboard)	49
Chart (1991)	Position
US Top Country Albums (Billboard)	74

== Certifications ==
Region	Certification	Certified units/sales
Canada (Music Canada)	Gold	50,000^{^}
United States (RIAA)	4× Platinum	4,000,000^{^}
^{^} Shipments figures based on certification alone.
