= Strait Country =

Studio album by George Strait
- Released: September 4, 1981
- Recorded: February 2-June 16, 1981
- Studios: The Waxworks (Berry Hill, Tennessee); Music City Music Hall (Nashville, Tennessee)
- Genres: Neotraditional country; honky-tonk; Bakersfield sound; Western swing
- Length: 27:51
- Label: MCA
- Producer: Blake Mevis

George Strait chronology
Strait Country (1981)	Strait from the Heart (1982)

Singles from Strait Country
- 1. "Unwound" Released: April 23, 1981; 2. "Down and Out" Released: August 28, 1981; 3. "If You're Thinking You Want a Stranger (There's One Coming Home)" Released: January 7, 1982

Strait Country is the debut studio album by American country music artist George Strait, released on September 4, 1981, by MCA Records. The album's traditional country music approach—a mix of Texas honky tonk and the Bakersfield sound—presented a sharp contrast to the dominating trends within country music at that time. The album includes the singles "Unwound", "Down and Out", and "If You're Thinking You Want a Stranger (There's One Coming Home)". The album peaked at number 26 on the US Billboard Top Country Albums chart. Strait Country has been certified platinum by the RIAA. The album was one of the first to be recorded and mixed digitally.

== Recording ==
In January 1981, MCA Records offered Strait a single deal, agreeing to release one song as a single and provide the necessary promotion. If the single was successful in sales and radio play, then an album deal would be offered. On February 2, 1981, Groundhog Day, Strait entered The Waxworks recording studio in Berry Hill, Tennessee with producer Blake Mevis to record "Unwound", a song written by an unknown songwriter named Dean Dillon and his writing partner Frank Dycus. Producer Mevis first heard the song through his music publisher, Tom Collins, who also sent it to Strait's new manager, Erv Woolsey, offering to finance a demo session if Strait would record the song. Woolsey listened to Dillon's rough demo of "Unwound" and knew immediately that the song could be a big hit and launch Strait's career. Woolsey and Strait agreed to record the song. Three additional songs were recorded during that February recording session: "Blame It on Mexico", "Perfect Lie", and "Nobody in His Right Mind Would've Left Her".

The "Unwound" single was released by MCA on April 23, 1981 and entered the Billboard Hot Country Singles chart the week of May 16. It soon made it into the top ten. Strait would later remember the experience of hearing his first record on the radio while working on his ranch in San Marcos.

I was shocked. I couldn't believe it. I mean, hearing your first record on the radio, when it was something that you had been trying to get to for so long, and then finally having it happen, it was wild. Here I was driving around the ranch there, and I'd hear it go up the chart, and I'm saying to myself, "What's wrong with this picture? I've got a hit record. I need to go out on the road and go play some concerts."

Several days after "Unwound" made it onto the charts, MCA offered Strait a recording contract and gave the go-ahead to proceed with the album. In early June, Strait returned to Nashville with the Ace in the Hole Band to perform every night throughout the week of June 7 at the Reflections Ballroom at the Radisson Hotel. That same week, Strait spent his days at the Music City Music Hall recording studios in Nashville with Mevis and a group of session musicians recording the remaining songs for his first album. This early decision to use session musicians on his recordings rather than his touring band set a pattern that he would continue to follow throughout his career. One of the songs from the February session, "Blame It on Mexico", was rerecorded during the June sessions and included on the album.

== Release and promotion ==
Strait Country was released on September 4, 1981 by MCA Records. To promote the album, Strait and the Ace in the Hole Band performed a series of shows and performed the new material. While eager to help publicize the album, Strait had a few ground rules that would remain in place throughout his career. First, he insisted that his private life remain private, and that his wife and family not be involved in press interviews and publicity events. Strait also insisted on remaining in Texas and not moving to the country music capital. In an early interview with Nashville's Music City News, Strait confessed, "If I find out later on that I have to move, well, I'll certainly move. But I would hate to leave Texas." And finally, he insisted on remaining true to his identity, and refused to take off the hat, despite considerable pressure to do so. As unfashionable as it might have appeared in Nashville at the time, it was a part of his identity—of just being himself.

== Artwork and packaging ==
Strait Country was released in vinyl format. The front cover photo was taken by Tom Wilkes showing Strait wearing a cream-colored straw cowboy hat and a Western shirt open at the neck, revealing a simple gold chain. Standing against a weathered fencepost, he's shown looking up with a "plaintive look in his eye". At a time when most country performers were wearing rhinestone outfits, leisure suits, and very few sporting cowboy hats, Strait came across as "real country, plain and simple". The back cover photo of the vinyl album shows the singer inside Gruene Hall, a Texas dance hall where he played during his early years. The photo was not included on the CD version. The back cover also contains track listing with songwriter credits, as well as music and production credits.

== Critical reception ==
Professional ratings
Review scores
Source	Rating
AllMusic	4/5 stars
Robert Christgau	B+

Strait Country received positive reviews upon its release in 1981. On the AllMusic website, it received four out of five stars. In his review for AllMusic, Stephen Thomas Erlewine noted how "startling" this debut album was during a time when country music was dominated by country-pop crossover songs, outlaw country anthems, the urban cowboy trend, and the Alabama-style country-rock movement. In contrast, Strait ignored the trends and focused on traditional country music, "drawing deep on honky tonk tradition, undeniably rooted in Texas but willing to wander outside of the Lone Star State's borders". Strait displays his clear love for the music of Merle Haggard on "Blame It on Mexico", produced with a "light production sheen" that makes it accessible and timely, and yet the singer's "delivery and attitude" make it "sound as pure country as the harder stuff". Erlewine observed:

And that's the genius of Strait Country—it showed how it was possible to be planted firmly in traditional country yet flexible enough to play softer stuff without losing that hardcore stance ... by blending the hardcore honky tonk, Western swing and Bakersfield country with a few melodic ballads that weren't designed for the barroom, he set the template for years and years of modern country.

Erlewine concluded that in addition to being influential, Strait Country is "flat-out great, the beginning of a remarkable streak of continually satisfying albums from George Strait".

Music critic Robert Christgau gave the album a B+ rating, admiring Strait's "quiet honky tonk" sound and "pleasant baritone".

== Track listing ==
Side 1
No.	Title	Writer(s)	Length
1.	"Unwound"	Dean Dillon; Frank Dycus	2:24
2.	"Honky Tonk Downstairs"	Dallas Frazier	2:31
3.	"Blame It on Mexico"	Darryl Staedtler	2:45
4.	"If You're Thinking You Want a Stranger (There's One Coming Home)"	Blake Mevis; David Wills	2:55
5.	"I Get Along with You"	Dillon; Dycus; Murray F. Cannon; Raleigh Squires; Jimmy Darrell	2:40

Side 2
No.	Title	Writer(s)	Length
6.	"Down and Out"	Dillon; Dycus	2:23
7.	"Friday Night Fever"	Dillon; Dycus; Mevis	2:27
8.	"Every Time You Throw Dirt on Her (You Lose a Little Ground)"	Michael Garvin; Tom Shapiro	3:05
9.	"She's Playing Hell Trying to Get Me to Heaven"	Dillon; Wills; Charles Quillen	2:39
10.	"Her Goodbye Hit Me in the Heart"	Dillon; Dycus	3:02
Total length:			27:51

== Personnel ==
- George Strait – lead vocals, acoustic guitar
- Mitch Humphries – keyboards
- Fred Newell – lead guitars
- Jimmy Capps – rhythm guitar
- Dave Kirby – rhythm guitar
- Jerry Shook – rhythm guitar
- Bobby Thompson – rhythm guitar
- Sonny Garrish – steel guitar
- Mike Leech – bass guitar
- Clyde Brooks – drums
- Bob Gelotte – drums
- Jerry Kroon – drums
- Rob Hajacos – fiddle
- Buddy Spicher – fiddle
- Sudie Callaway – background vocals
- Rita Figlio – background vocals
- Arlene Harden – background vocals
- Sherri Huffman – background vocals
- Diane Tidwell – background vocals
- Curtis Young – background vocals
- Blake Mevis – producer
- Bill Harris – engineer, mixing
- Mike Poston – engineer, mixing
- Dan Dea – assistant engineer
- David DeBusk – assistant engineer
- Milan Bogdan – digital editing (CD)
- Glenn Meadows – digital mastering (CD)
- Simon Levy – art direction
- Tom Wilkes – photography
- Katie Gillon – coordination
- Sherri Halford – coordination

== Charts ==
=== Weekly charts ===
Chart (1981–1982)	Peak position
US Top Country Albums (Billboard)	26

=== Year-end charts ===
Chart (1982)	Position
US Top Country Albums (Billboard)	18

== Certifications ==
Certifications for Strait Country
Region	Certification	Certified units/sales
United States (RIAA)	Platinum	1,000,000^{^}
^{^} Shipments figures based on certification alone.

== Release history ==
Year	Label	Format	Catalog
1981	MCA Records	LP	MCA–5248
1990	MCA Records	Cassette	MCAC–27092
1991	MCA Records	CD	MCAD–31087
