= Twang (album) =

Studio album by George Strait
- Released: August 11, 2009
- Studio: Shrimpboat Sound (Key West, Florida); Ocean Way (Nashville, Tennessee); Starstruck (Nashville, Tennessee); Sound Stage (Nashville, Tennessee)
- Genre: Country
- Length: 42:11
- Label: MCA Nashville
- Producer: Tony Brown; George Strait

George Strait chronology
Classic Christmas (2008)	Twang (2009)	Here for a Good Time (2011)

Singles from Twang
- 1. "Living for the Night" Released: May 28, 2009; 2. "Twang" Released: October 12, 2009; 3. "I Gotta Get to You" Released: February 16, 2010; 4. "The Breath You Take" Released: July 12, 2010

Twang is the twenty-sixth studio album by American country music artist George Strait. It was released on August 11, 2009, via MCA Nashville, the same label to which Strait has been signed since 1981. It is produced by Tony Brown. The lead-off single "Living for the Night", which Strait wrote with his son Bubba and songwriter Dean Dillon, was released in May 2009. As of the chart dated January 8, 2011, the album has sold 662,023 copies in the US. "Twang" was nominated for Best Country Album at the 2010 Grammy Awards.

== Content ==
The album includes three songs that Strait co-wrote with his son, George "Bubba" Strait, Jr., who is also the sole writer of the track "Arkansas Dave." Among these three songs is the lead-off single "Living for the Night", which was also co-written by Dean Dillon, who has co-written several of Strait's previous singles. This album is also the second of his solo career to contain a song that he wrote/co-wrote, with 1982's Strait from the Heart being the first. The album's final track, "El Rey", is a cover version of a Spanish-language song written and originally recorded by Mexican songwriter José Alfredo Jiménez. "Twang" was released on October 13, 2009 as the second single, followed by "I Gotta Get to You" in February 2010 and "The Breath You Take" in July.

It is Strait's first album not to feature a number one single since 2003's Honkytonkville.

== Critical reception ==
Professional ratings
Aggregate scores
Source	Rating
Metacritic	(75/100)
Review scores
Source	Rating
Allmusic	4/5 stars
Billboard	(favorable)
The Boston Globe	(average)
Chicago Tribune	3/4 stars
Country Weekly	4.5/5 stars
Entertainment Weekly	B
Los Angeles Times	3/4 stars
PopMatters	7/10 stars
Slant Magazine	3/5 stars

Twang generated positive reviews overall, with most favorable reviews citing the Straits' co-writing credits and the "El Rey" cover as variations from Strait's typical musical image. On Metacritic, it has been given a score of 75 out of 100 based on "generally favorable reviews".

Giving the album four stars out of five, Stephen Thomas Erlewine of Allmusic said that Twang was "recognizably within his comfort zone" but had "a few surprises," saying that the "El Rey" cover and the songs that the Straits' co-wrote "give Twang some serious character and make it more than just another sturdy Strait record." Jeffrey B. Remz of Country Standard Time gave a favorable review, with his review also citing the "El Rey" cover and the presence of the Straits' songwriting credits as standout tracks, saying of the latter, "Based on the quality of these cuts, one is left scratching the head wondering what took so long." It received a four-and-a-half star rating (out of five) from Country Weekly reviewer Chris Neal, who said that the album "finds the singer taking several chances with his tried-and-true formula and seeing his bets pay off handsomely." Bobby Peacock of Roughstock also cited the Straits' co-writes and "El Rey" as "surprises" and saying, "Once again, George Strait has proven just why he is still at the top of his game thirty years into his career." Brian Mansfield of USA Today gave it all four stars and said, "Strait has been putting out country hits since before Taylor Swift and Carrie Underwood were even born. While much contemporary country courts an ever-younger audience, Strait is making music for adults. And he's doing it masterfully."

Whitney Pastorek of Entertainment Weekly gave the album a B rating, describing it as "another album of immaculately recorded tracks." Jonathan Keefe of Slant Magazine gave it three out of five, saying "The risks Strait has taken here are more like slight variations on his tried-and-true formula and image." Eric R. Danton of Hartford Courant gave it a positive review and said that "Strait is Everyman. He picks solid songs with themes just about anyone can relate to, and he sings them with a hint of twang in his warm voice."

Julie Thanki of The Washington Post gave it an average review and called the album "a collection as solid as anything the reliable south Texan has ever released." Peter Gerstenzang of American Songwriter gave it a positive review and called it "another stone-cold classic from King George. Now, if only his courtiers would pay attention. Then the whole darn kingdom of country music would be in much better shape." John Metzger of The Music Box gave it a score of three-and-a-half stars out of five and said about Strait: "At times, he is too tentative about leaving his familiar environment, but for the most part, Strait uses Twang to push down the walls that have confined him for years." However, Margaret Moser of The Austin Chronicle gave it two-and-a-half stars out of five and said that the album "didn't have to be as good as it is, with its punchy Jim Lauderdale songs ("Twang," "I Gotta Get to You") and Delbert McClinton's "Same Kind of Crazy" hand-carving the edges like Strait was still playing local honky-tonks instead of singing hokum like "Where Have I Been All My Life" for the arena masses."

On December 2, 2009, the album was nominated for the Grammy Award for Best Country Album.

== Track listing ==
No.	Title	Writer(s)	Length
1.	"Twang"	Jim Lauderdale, Kendell Marvel, Jimmy Ritchey	2:55
2.	"Where Have I Been All My Life"	Sherrié Austin, Wil Nance, Steve Williams	3:06
3.	"I Gotta Get to You"	Lauderdale, Ritchey, Blaine Larsen	3:10
4.	"Easy as You Go"	Steve Bogard, Rick Giles	3:22
5.	"Living for the Night"	Dean Dillon, Bubba Strait, George Strait	3:41
6.	"Same Kind of Crazy"	Delbert McClinton, Gary Nicholson	3:32
7.	"Out of Sight, Out of Mind"	B. Strait, G. Strait	3:07
8.	"Arkansas Dave"	B. Strait	3:18
9.	"The Breath You Take"	D. Dillon, Jessie Jo Dillon, Casey Beathard	3:35
10.	"He's Got That Something Special"	B. Strait, G. Strait, D. Dillon	3:23
11.	"Hot Grease and Zydeco"	Gordon Bradberry, Tony Ramey	3:19
12.	"Beautiful Day for Goodbye"	Pat Bunch, Doug Johnson	3:09
13.	"El Rey"	José Alfredo Jiménez	2:26
Total length:			42:11

== Personnel ==
- George Strait – lead vocals, acoustic guitar, backing vocals (13)
- John Barlow Jarvis – acoustic piano, Wurlitzer electric piano, Hammond B3 organ
- Steve Nathan – acoustic piano, Wurlitzer electric piano, Hammond B3 organ, synthesizers
- Randy Scruggs – acoustic guitar
- Steve Gibson – acoustic guitar, electric guitar, gut-string guitar
- Brent Mason – electric guitar, gut-string guitar
- Paul Franklin – steel guitar
- Stuart Duncan – fiddle, mandolin
- Glenn Worf – bass guitar, electric upright bass
- Eddie Bayers – drums
- Eric Darken – percussion
- Mike Haynes – trumpet
- The Nashville String Machine – strings
- Thom Flora – backing vocals
- Marty Slayton – backing vocals
- Eddie Perez – backing vocals (13)
- Chris Rodriguez – backing vocals (13)

=== Production ===
- Brian Wright – A&R
- Tony Brown – producer
- George Strait – producer, art direction
- Chuck Ainlay – recording, mixing
- Kyle Lehning – string recording
- Jim Cooley – assistant engineer, additional assistant engineer
- Joe Martino – additional assistant engineer
- Todd Tidwell – additional assistant engineer, assistant string engineer
- Rob Clark – assistant string engineer
- Casey Wood – assistant string engineer
- Bob Ludwig – mastering at Gateway Mastering (Portland, Maine)
- Erin McAnally – production coordinator
- Karen Naff – art direction
- Craig Allen – design
- Vanessa Gavalya – photography
- Stanley Murray – hair, make-up
- Maria Hidalgo – wardrobe stylist
- Erv Woolsey – management

== Chart performance ==
=== Weekly charts ===
Chart (2009)	Peak position
Canadian Albums (Billboard)	5
US Billboard 200	1
US Top Country Albums (Billboard)	1

=== Year-end charts ===
Chart (2009)	Position
US Billboard 200	78
US Top Country Albums (Billboard)	16
Chart (2010)	Position
US Top Country Albums (Billboard)	31

== Certifications ==
Certifications for Twang
Region	Certification	Certified units/sales
United States (RIAA)	Gold	500,000^{^}
^{^} Shipments figures based on certification alone.
