= 7 (George Strait album) =

#7

Studio album by George Strait
- Released: May 14, 1986
- Recorded: January 1986
- Studio: The Castle (Franklin, TN) and Sound Stage Studios (Nashville, TN).
- Genre: Neotraditional country
- Length: 26:48
- Label: MCA; MCAD-5750
- Producer: Jimmy Bowen; George Strait

George Strait chronology
Something Special (1985)	#7 (1986)	Merry Christmas Strait to You! (1986)

Singles from #7
- 1. "Nobody in His Right Mind Would've Left Her" Released: April 21, 1986; 2. "It Ain't Cool to Be Crazy About You" Released: August 25, 1986

Professional ratings
Review scores
Source	Rating
AllMusic	3/5 stars
Robert Christgau	C+
Rolling Stone	(average)

#7 is the sixth studio album by American country music artist George Strait—his seventh album including his Greatest Hits—released on May 14, 1986, by MCA Records. It is certified platinum by the RIAA and it produced two singles: "Nobody in His Right Mind Would've Left Her" (which had previously been recorded by Dean Dillon in 1980), and "It Ain't Cool to Be Crazy About You", both of which reached Number One on the country charts in 1986. "Deep Water" is a cover of a 1948 Bob Wills and His Texas Playboys song. "Cow Town" is a cover of a 1962 Webb Pierce song.

== Track listing ==
Side 1
No.	Title	Writer(s)	Length
1.	"Deep Water"	Fred Rose	2:31
2.	"Nobody in His Right Mind Would've Left Her"	Dean Dillon	2:50
3.	"Rhythm of the Road"	Dan McCoy	2:16
4.	"I'm Never Gonna Let You Go"	Clay Blaker	3:08
5.	"You Still Get to Me"	McCoy	2:03

Side 2
No.	Title	Writer(s)	Length
6.	"Stranger Things Have Happened"	David Chamberlain	2:48
7.	"It Ain't Cool to Be Crazy About You"	Dillon, Royce Porter	2:49
8.	"Why'd You Go and Break My Heart"	David Anthony	2:39
9.	"My Old Flame Is Burnin' Another Honky Tonk Down"	Mack Vickery, Wayne Kemp, Bobby Borchers	2:55
10.	"Cow Town"	Hal Burns, Tex Ritter	2:49
Total length:			26:48

== Personnel ==
- George Strait – lead vocals, acoustic guitar
- John Barlow Jarvis – pianos
- Richard Bennett – electric guitar, acoustic guitar
- Billy Joe Walker, Jr. – electric guitar, acoustic guitar
- Reggie Young – electric guitar
- Paul Franklin – steel guitar
- Johnny Gimble – fiddle, mandolin
- David Hungate – bass guitar
- Eddie Bayers – drums
- Curtis "Mr. Harmony" Young – backing vocals

Production

- Jimmy Bowen – producer
- George Strait – producer
- Willie Pevear – recording
- Chuck Ainlay – overdub recording
- Bob Bullock – overdub recording
- Mark J. Coddington – second engineer
- Tim Kish – second engineer
- Keith Odle – second engineer
- Russ Martin – second engineer
- Ron Treat – mixing
- Glenn Meadows – mastering at Masterfonics (Nashville, Tennessee)
- Peter Nash – photography
- Simon Levy – art direction
- Camille Brown – design
- Erv Woolsey – management

== Charts ==
=== Weekly charts ===
Chart (1986)	Peak position
US Billboard 200	126
US Top Country Albums (Billboard)	1

=== Year-end charts ===
Chart (1985)	Position
US Top Country Albums (Billboard)	16

== Certifications ==
Certifications for 7
Region	Certification	Certified units/sales
United States (RIAA)	Platinum	1,000,000^{^}
^{^} Shipments figures based on certification alone.
