= List of Top Country Albums number ones of 1987 =

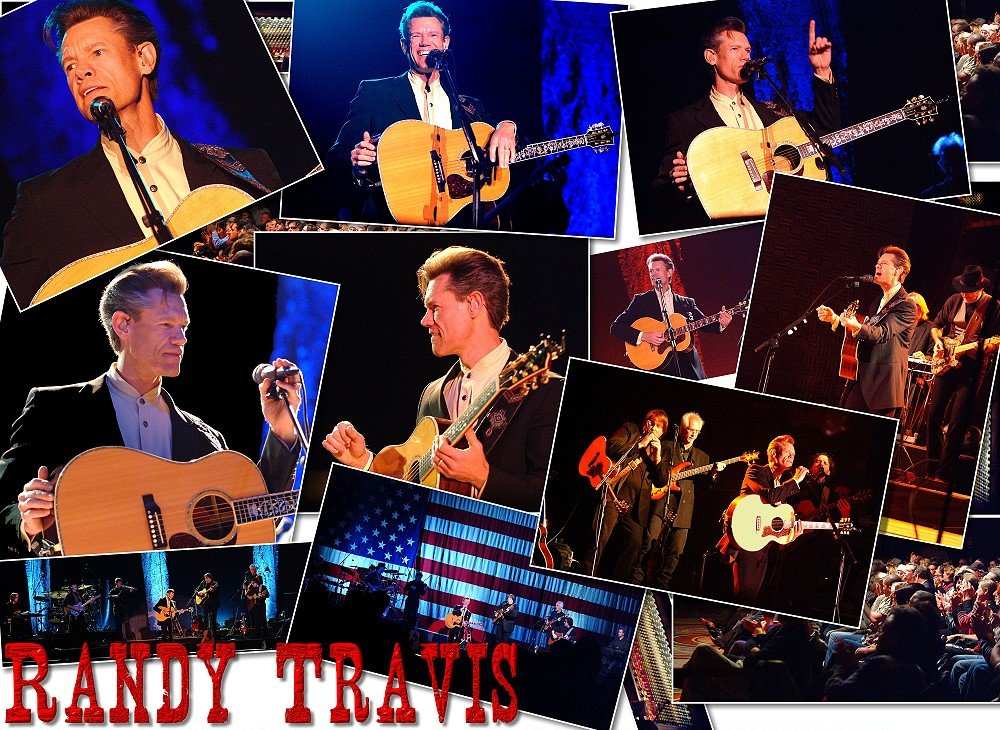
Randy Travis dominated the number one position in 1987 with his album Always & Forever.

Top Country Albums is a chart that ranks the top-performing country music albums in the United States, published by Billboard. In 1987, 12 different albums topped the chart, based on sales reports submitted by a representative sample of stores nationwide.

The number one position was occupied for nearly half the year by Always & Forever by Randy Travis. First topping the chart in the issue of Billboard dated June 20, by the end of the year the album would spend 25 weeks at number one in three separate runs. It would add a further 18 weeks to its tally the following year for a final total of 43 weeks atop the listing, beating by a considerable amount the previous record of 28 weeks set by Alabama with both Feels So Right and Mountain Music between 1981 and 1983. Travis was one of the main artists identified with the neotraditional country trend, which moved away from the pop music-influenced style which dominated the country charts in the earlier part of the decade in favour of a sound closer to the genre's roots. Having first topped the chart the previous year with his first major-label album Storms of Life, Travis would continue to experience huge success for the remainder of the decade before his chart performance began to decline in the 1990s.

Three acts achieved more than one number one in 1987. In the issue of Billboard dated January 3, the band Alabama was at number one with the album The Touch, its eighth week in the top spot. Later in the year, the band spent a single week in the top spot with Just Us, the group's eighth chart-topper of the number ones. George Strait spent six non-consecutive weeks at number one in the spring with Ocean Front Property and returned to the top of the chart for a single week in November with the compilation album Greatest Hits Volume Two. Hank Williams Jr spent one week atop the chart in April with Hank Live and a second week at number one in August with Born to Boogie, bringing his run of consecutive chart-toppers since 1984 to six. In April, the band Restless Heart achieved its only number one with Wheels, which spent one week at number one. The band experienced a period of great chart success for the remainder of the decade, but its fortunes declined after lead vocalist Larry Stewart left in 1990 and it disbanded in 1994.

== Chart history ==
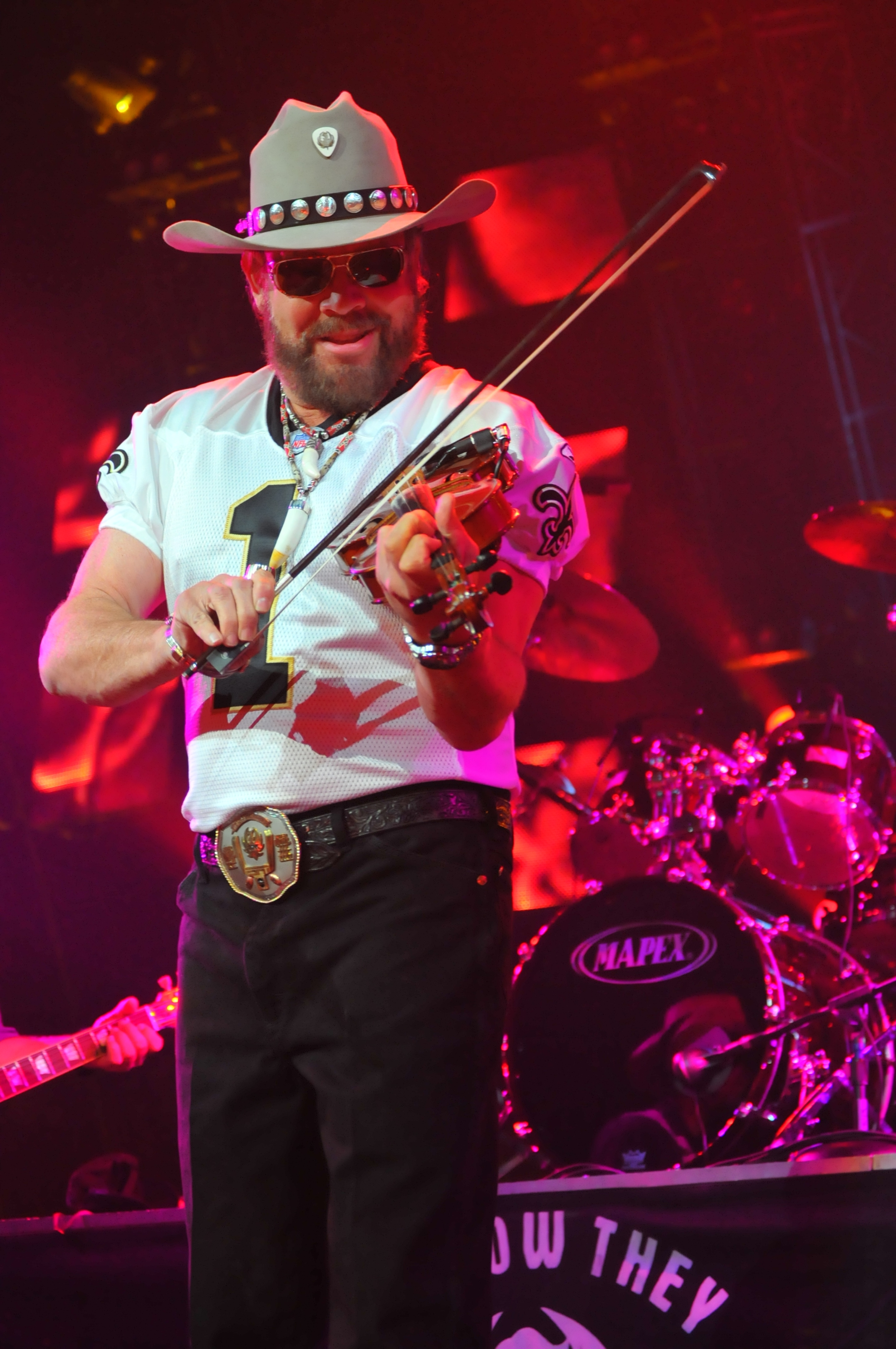
Hank Williams Jr. had two number ones in 1987.

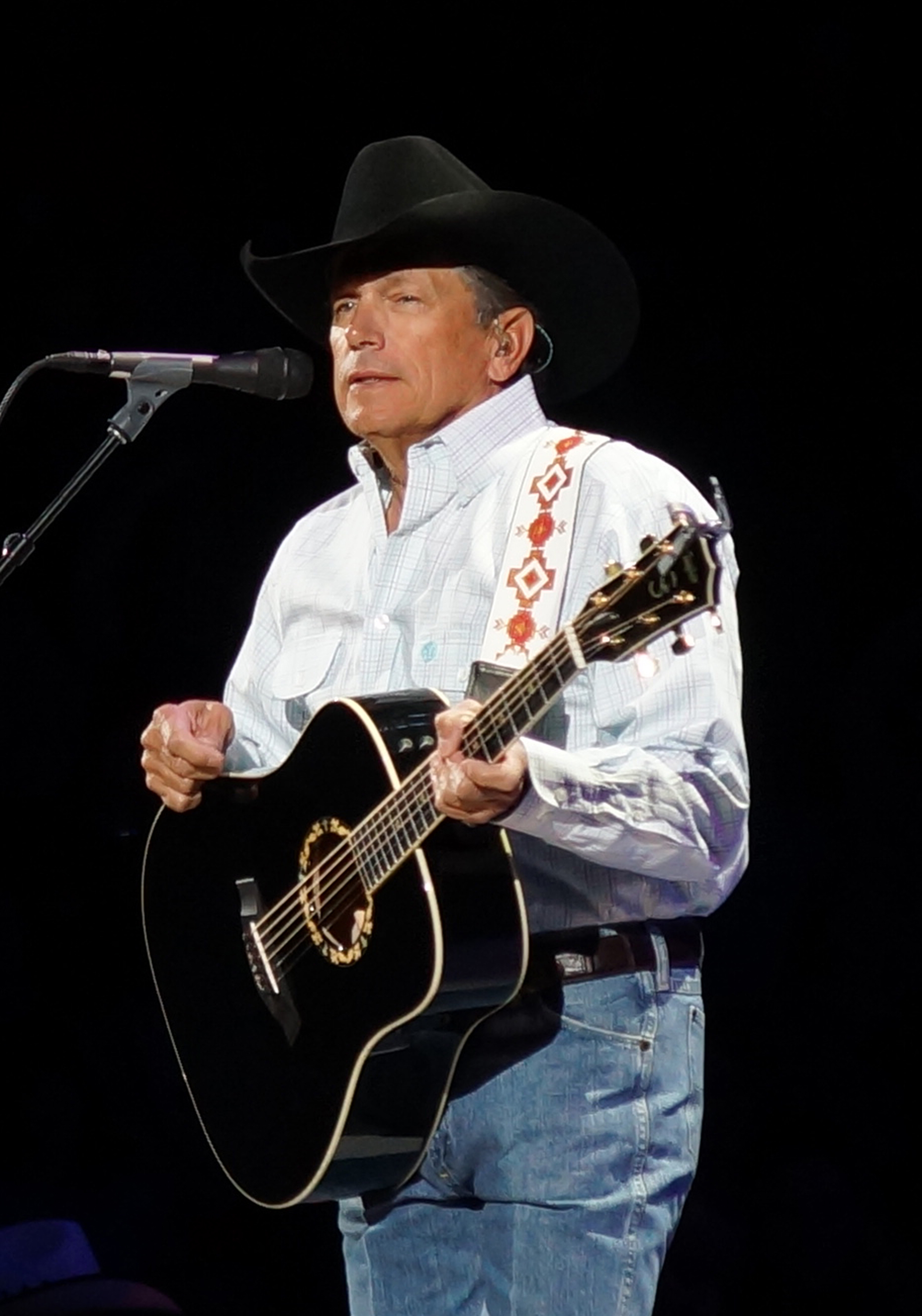
George Strait also had two chart-toppers during the year.

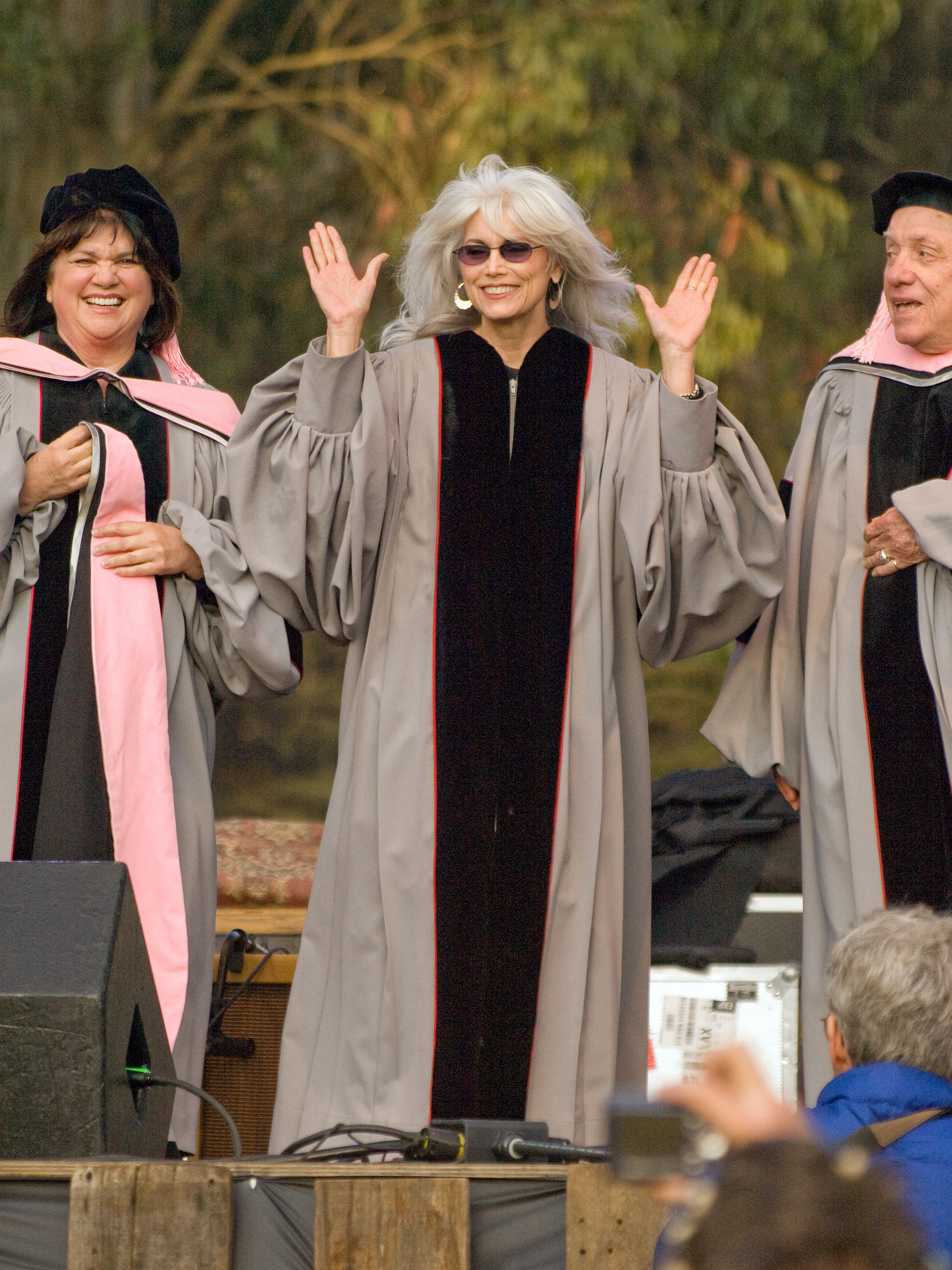
Linda Ronstadt (left) and Emmylou Harris (center) both achieved their first number-one album since 1977 when they collaborated with Dolly Parton on the album Trio.

Issue date	Title	Artist(s)	Ref.
January 3	The Touch	Alabama	
January 10	The Touch	Alabama	
January 17	The Touch	Alabama	
January 24	What Am I Gonna Do About You	Reba McEntire	
January 31	What Am I Gonna Do About You	Reba McEntire	
February 7	What Am I Gonna Do About You	Reba McEntire	
February 14	Ocean Front Property	George Strait	
February 21	Ocean Front Property	George Strait	
February 28	Ocean Front Property	George Strait	
March 7	Ocean Front Property	George Strait	
March 14	Ocean Front Property	George Strait	
March 21	Heartland	The Judds	
March 28	Heartland	The Judds	
April 4	Heartland	The Judds	
April 11	Hank Live	Hank Williams Jr.	
April 18	Wheels	Restless Heart	
April 25	Ocean Front Property	George Strait	
May 2	Trio	Dolly Parton, Linda Ronstadt & Emmylou Harris	
May 9	Trio	Dolly Parton, Linda Ronstadt & Emmylou Harris	
May 16	Trio	Dolly Parton, Linda Ronstadt & Emmylou Harris	
May 23	Trio	Dolly Parton, Linda Ronstadt & Emmylou Harris	
May 30	Trio	Dolly Parton, Linda Ronstadt & Emmylou Harris	
June 6	Hillbilly Deluxe	Dwight Yoakam	
June 13	Hillbilly Deluxe	Dwight Yoakam	
June 20	Always & Forever	Randy Travis	
June 27	Always & Forever	Randy Travis	
July 4	Always & Forever	Randy Travis	
July 11	Always & Forever	Randy Travis	
July 18	Always & Forever	Randy Travis	
July 25	Always & Forever	Randy Travis	
August 1	Always & Forever	Randy Travis	
August 8	Always & Forever	Randy Travis	
August 15	Always & Forever	Randy Travis	
August 22	Always & Forever	Randy Travis	
August 29	Born to Boogie	Hank Williams Jr.	
September 5	Always & Forever	Randy Travis	
September 12	Always & Forever	Randy Travis	
September 19	Always & Forever	Randy Travis	
September 26	Always & Forever	Randy Travis	
October 3	Always & Forever	Randy Travis	
October 10	Always & Forever	Randy Travis	
October 17	Always & Forever	Randy Travis	
October 24	Always & Forever	Randy Travis	
October 31	Always & Forever	Randy Travis	
November 7	Greatest Hits Volume Two	George Strait	
November 14	Always & Forever	Randy Travis	
November 21	Just Us	Alabama	
November 28	Always & Forever	Randy Travis	
December 5	Always & Forever	Randy Travis	
December 12	Always & Forever	Randy Travis	
December 19	Always & Forever	Randy Travis	
December 2	Always & Forever	Randy Travis	
