= If You Ain't Lovin' You Ain't Livin' =

Studio album by George Strait
- Released: February 22, 1988
- Recorded: September 1987
- Studios: Sound Stage Studios, Nashville
- Genres: Neotraditional country, honky tonk
- Length: 28:20
- Label: MCA
- Producers: Jimmy Bowen; George Strait

George Strait chronology
Greatest Hits Volume Two (1987)	If You Ain't Lovin' You Ain't Livin' (1988)	Beyond the Blue Neon (1989)

Singles from If You Ain't Lovin' You Ain't Livin'
- 1. "Famous Last Words of a Fool" Released: January 11, 1988; 2. "Baby Blue" Released: April 25, 1988; 3. "If You Ain't Lovin' (You Ain't Livin')" Released: August 22, 1988

Professional ratings
Review scores
Source	Rating
AllMusic	3/5 stars
Los Angeles Times	2/4 stars
The Philadelphia Inquirer	3/4 stars

If You Ain't Lovin' You Ain't Livin' is the eighth studio album by American country music artist George Strait, released on February 22, 1988, by MCA Records. It is certified platinum by the RIAA and it produced three singles for Strait on the Hot Country Songs charts: the title track (originally recorded by Faron Young), "Baby Blue", and "Famous Last Words of a Fool" (originally recorded by Dean Dillon), all of which reached Number One.

== Track listing ==
No.	Title	Writer(s)	Length
1.	"If You Ain't Lovin' (You Ain't Livin')"	Tommy Collins	2:21
2.	"Under These Conditions"	Ronnie McDowell, Joe Meador, Troy Seals	3:30
3.	"Baby Blue"	Aaron Barker	3:35
4.	"Don't Mind If I Do"	Skip Ewing, Don Sampson	3:21
5.	"Bigger Man Than Me"	Curtis Wayne	2:51
6.	"Famous Last Words of a Fool"	Dean Dillon, Rex Huston	3:37
7.	"It's Too Late Now"	David Chamberlain	2:30
8.	"Is It That Time Again"	Buddy Cannon, Dillon, Vern Gosdin	2:53
9.	"Let's Get Down to It"	L. David Lewis	2:04
10.	"Back to Bein' Me"	Hank Cochran, Dillon	2:35
Total length:			28:20

== Personnel ==
- George Strait – lead vocals, acoustic guitar
- Floyd Domino – pianos
- Pat Flynn – acoustic guitars
- Billy Joe Walker Jr. – acoustic guitars, electric guitars
- Reggie Young – electric guitars
- Paul Franklin – dobro, steel guitar
- David Hungate – bass
- Eddie Bayers – drums
- Johnny Gimble – fiddle
- Curtis Young – backing vocals
- Liana Young – backing vocals

Production

- Jimmy Bowen – producer
- George Strait – producer
- Bob Bullock – recording, overdub recording
- Willie Peaver – overdub recording
- Tim Kish – overdub recording, second engineer
- Russ Martin – second engineer
- Marty Williams – second engineer
- John Guess – mixing
- Milan Bogdan – digital editing
- Glenn Meadows – mastering
- Masterfonics (Nashville, Tennessee) – editing and mastering location
- Jessie Noble – project coordinator
- Simon Levy – art direction
- Mickey Braithwaite – design
- Rick Henson – photography
- Erv Woolsey – management

== Chart positions ==
Chart (1988)	Peak position
U.S. Billboard Top Country Albums	1
U.S. Billboard 200	87

== Certifications ==
Certifications for If You Ain't Lovin' You Ain't Livin'
Region	Certification	Certified units/sales
United States (RIAA)	Platinum	1,000,000^{^}
^{^} Shipments figures based on certification alone.
