= Every Little Honky Tonk Bar =

Single by George Strait

from the album Honky Tonk Time Machine
- Released: February 11, 2019
- Genre: Neotraditional country
- Length: 3:14
- Label: MCA Nashville
- Songwriters: George Strait; Bubba Strait; Dean Dillon
- Producers: Chuck Ainlay; George Strait

George Strait singles chronology
"Goin' Goin' Gone" (2016)	"Every Little Honky Tonk Bar" (2019)	"The Weight of the Badge" (2019)

Music video
- "Every Little Honky Tonk Bar" on YouTube

"Every Little Honky Tonk Bar" is a song co-written and recorded by American country music artist George Strait. It was released February 11, 2019, as the lead-off single from his 30th studio album Honky Tonk Time Machine.

== Content ==
Strait co-wrote the song with his son Bubba Strait and longtime collaborator Dean Dillon, which was written "during a late-night session and was inspired by Bubba's tongue-twisting opening line, 'Whiskey is the gasoline that lights the fire that burns the bridge.'" He debuted the song for the first time with a live performance in December 2018 at a show in Las Vegas, Nevada.

== Music video ==
A music video premiered in May 2019, consisting of live footage of the singer performing the song on tour. It was Strait's first single to receive an official music video in a decade, since 2009's "Living for the Night".

== Chart performance ==
"Every Little Honky Tonk Bar" reached a peak of number 17 on the Billboard Country Airplay, making it Strait's first top 20 hit on the chart since 2013's "I Got a Car". It also peaked at number 20 on the Billboard Hot Country Songs chart.

== Charts ==
=== Weekly charts ===
Chart (2019)	Peak position
Canada Country (Billboard)	29
US Bubbling Under Hot 100 (Billboard)	11
US Country Airplay (Billboard)	17
US Hot Country Songs (Billboard)	20

=== Year-end charts ===
Chart (2019)	Position
US Country Airplay (Billboard)	60
US Hot Country Songs (Billboard)	70

== Certifications ==
Certifications for Every Little Honky Tonk Bar
Region	Certification	Certified units/sales
United States (RIAA)	Platinum	1,000,000^{‡}
^{‡} Sales+streaming figures based on certification alone.
