= Something Special (George Strait album) =

Studio album by George Strait
- Released: August 29, 1985
- Recorded: February 1985
- Studio: Sound Stage Studios; Nashville, Tennessee
- Genre: Neotraditional country; Western swing; honky-tonk
- Length: 32:49
- Label: MCA
- Producer: Jimmy Bowen; George Strait

George Strait chronology
Greatest Hits (1985)	Something Special (1985)	#7 (1986)

Singles from Something Special
- 1. "The Chair" Released: August 26, 1985; 2. "You're Something Special to Me" Released: December 23, 1985

Professional ratings
Review scores
Source	Rating
AllMusic	4.5/5 stars
Robert Christgau	A−

Something Special is the fifth studio album by American country music artist George Strait, released on August 29, 1985, by MCA Records. It is certified platinum by the RIAA. The album produced singles in the track "You're Something Special to Me" (#4 on Hot Country Singles) and "The Chair" (#1 on the same chart). It was the first album for the MCA label to be issued on both LP album and compact disc. "Blue is Not a Word" was previously recorded by Kari Pickett in 1978.

== Track listing ==
No.	Title	Writer(s)	Length
1.	"You're Something Special to Me"	David Anthony	3:19
2.	"Last Time the First Time"	Robert N. Kelly	2:13
3.	"Haven't You Heard"	Red Lane, Wayne Kemp	2:55
4.	"In Too Deep"	Jerry Max Lane, Erv Woolsey	2:38
5.	"Blue Is Not a Word"	Jo-El Sonnier, Judy Ball	2:52
6.	"You Sure Got This Ol' Redneck Feelin' Blue"	Dean Dillon, Buzz Rabin	3:12
7.	"The Chair"	Hank Cochran, Dillon	2:50
8.	"Dance Time in Texas"	Peter Rowan	3:16
9.	"Lefty's Gone"	Sanger D. Shafer	3:14
10.	"I've Seen That Look on Me (A Thousand Times)"	Harlan Howard, Shirl Milete	3:24
Total length:			32:49

== Personnel ==
- George Strait – lead vocals, acoustic guitar
- John Hobbs – keyboards
- Richard Bennett – acoustic guitar
- Dean Parks – acoustic guitar
- Billy Joe Walker Jr. – electric guitar
- Reggie Young – electric guitar
- Paul Franklin – pedal steel guitar
- David Hungate – bass guitar
- Matt Betton – drums
- Johnny Gimble – fiddle
- Curtis "Mr. Harmony" Young – backing vocals

=== Production ===
- Jimmy Bowen – producer
- George Strait – producer
- Bob Bullock – engineer
- Ron Treat – engineer
- Mark Coddington – second engineer
- Tim Kish – second engineer
- Russ Martin – second engineer
- Chuck Ainlay – mixing at GroundStar Laboratories (Nashville, Tennessee)
- Glenn Meadows – mastering at Georgetown Masters (Nashville, Tennessee)
- Peter Brill Nash – photography
- Simon Levy – art direction
- Brown, Wallace & Associates, Inc. – design and production
- Erv Woosley – management

== Charts ==
=== Weekly charts ===
Chart (1985)	Peak position
US Top Country Albums (Billboard)	1

=== Year-end charts ===
Chart (1986)	Position
US Top Country Albums (Billboard)	4

== Certifications ==
Certifications for Something Special
Region	Certification	Certified units/sales
United States (RIAA)	Platinum	1,000,000^{^}
^{^} Shipments figures based on certification alone.
