= Drinkin' Man =

Single by George Strait

from the album Here for a Good Time
- Released: April 30, 2012
- Genre: Country
- Length: 4:27
- Label: MCA Nashville
- Songwriters: Dean Dillon; Bubba Strait; George Strait
- Producers: Tony Brown; George Strait

George Strait singles chronology
"Love's Gonna Make It Alright" (2011)	"Drinkin' Man" (2012)	"Give It All We Got Tonight" (2012)

"Drinkin' Man" is a song co-written and recorded by the American country music singer George Strait. The song was written by Strait with his son, Bubba and Dean Dillon. It was released on 30 April 2012, as the third single from his album Here for a Good Time.

== Critical reception ==
"Drinkin' Man" received critical acclaim. Billy Dukes of Taste of Country rates the song 4.5 stars out of 5. He states, "the dark ballad from an equally dark album can immediately go alongside songs like ‘I Saw God Today’ in terms of powerful messages from the second half of the singer’s career. Its weight is impossible to ignore." He also says, "‘Drinkin’ Man’ is a courageous choice for a third single from ‘Here for a Good Time’ — but a good one."

Kevin John Coyne of Country Universe gave the song an A rating. Coyne says, "More than thirty years into his legendary career, George Strait has released the most compelling single of his career with “Drinkin’ Man.”" He goes on to say, "Strait isn’t known for dealing with such challenging subject matter, but his experience as a singer and remarkable growth as a songwriter have resulted in the genre’s best drinking song in recent memory. It’s something that Merle Haggard or George Jones would have produced at their peak." He ends with saying, "this is the finest single that George Strait has ever released."

== Chart performance ==
"Drinkin' Man" debuted at number 54 on the Hot Country Songs charts. It peaked at number 37 on the country charts in May 2012, becoming Strait's first single to miss the Top 10 since "Twang" in 2009.

Chart (2012)	Peak position
US Hot Country Songs (Billboard)	37
