= The Weight of the Badge =

Single by George Strait

from the album Honky Tonk Time Machine
- Released: September 30, 2019
- Recorded: 2018
- Genre: Neotraditional country
- Length: 3:46
- Label: MCA Nashville
- Songwriters: Dean Dillon; Bubba Strait; George Strait
- Producers: Chuck Ainlay; George Strait

George Strait singles chronology
"Every Little Honky Tonk Bar" (2019)	"The Weight of the Badge" (2019)

Music video
- "The Weight of the Badge" on YouTube

"The Weight of the Badge" is a song by American country music singer George Strait. It was released on September 30, 2019, as the second single from his thirtieth studio album Honky Tonk Time Machine. Strait co-wrote the song with Dean Dillon and Strait's son, Bubba.

== Background ==
"The Weight of the Badge" was co-written by George Strait, Bubba Strait, and Dean Dillon.

The song was released on September 30, 2019, as Honky Tonk Time Machine's second single after "Every Little Honky Tonk Bar."

Strait stated that the video and song were a tribute to "our friends and neighbors who carry the weight of the badge each day." He added, "We appreciate you and the sacrifices you and your families make."

== Music video ==
The official music video was released on October 28, 2021, coinciding with First Responders Day. The video opens with footage of police officers raising the American flag at the New York State Police Academy. A voiceover reflects on the sacrifices made by officers. Throughout the video, viewers see interviews with first responders and their family members, who speak about the gravity of the job and how it affects their personal lives.

At the conclusion of the video, a first responder gifts Strait a miniature replica of his badge and one of his original collar honors in gratitude for the tribute. The video premiered at the First Responders Children's Foundation 20th Anniversary Gala in New York City. Additionally, Strait launched a website to encourage people to share their own stories and appreciation for first responders.

== Critical reception ==
The song stood out on Honky Tonk Time Machine for its sobering tone, contrasting with the more upbeat tracks.

While "The Weight of the Badge" did not achieve the same commercial success as "Every Little Honky Tonk Bar," it resonated deeply with fans and communities connected to the song's message.

== Charts ==
Chart (2019)	Peak position
US Country Airplay (Billboard)	51
US Hot Country Songs (Billboard)	43
