= Honky Tonk Time Machine =

Studio album by George Strait
- Released: March 29, 2019
- Recorded: 2018
- Studios: Shrimpboat Sound (Key West, Florida); Blackbird (Nashville, Tennessee); Sound Stage (Nashville, Tennessee); Studio Phenix (Nashville, Tennessee); Pedernales Recording (Spicewood, Texas); Keith Harter Music (San Antonio, Texas)
- Genres: Neotraditional country; honky-tonk
- Length: 46:09
- Label: MCA Nashville
- Producers: Chuck Ainlay, George Strait

George Strait chronology
Strait Out of the Box: Part 2 (2016)	Honky Tonk Time Machine (2019)	Cowboys and Dreamers (2024)

Singles from Honky Tonk Time Machine
- 1. "Every Little Honky Tonk Bar" Released: February 11, 2019; 2. "The Weight of the Badge" Released: September 30, 2019

Honky Tonk Time Machine is the thirtieth studio album by American country music artist George Strait, released on March 29, 2019 on MCA Nashville. The album's first single, "Every Little Honky Tonk Bar", was released to radio on February 11, 2019.

== Content ==
The album's lead single, "Every Little Honky Tonk Bar", was issued on February 11, 2019. Prior to this, he had released another song, "Código", as a preview. As with his last album Cold Beer Conversation, Honky Tonk Time Machine was co-produced by Chuck Ainlay. The album includes a cover of Johnny Paycheck's "Old Violin". Strait co-wrote most of the songs on the album with his son Bubba Strait and Dean Dillon, who has written many of Strait's singles.

== Critical reception ==
The album was met with largely positive reviews. Stephen Thomas Erlewine of Allmusic rated the album 3.5 out of 5 stars, stating that "Strait sings with humor, tenderness, and ease, qualities that lend the deliberately nostalgic Honky Tonk Time Machine grace, resonance, and depth. Perhaps this isn't a new trick for Strait, but it's one to be cherished nonetheless." Rating it 3 out of 5, Will Hermes of Rolling Stone thought that the strongest songs were " top-shelf boilerplate honky-tonkin'", highlighting the "Old Violin" cover and Willie Nelson duet along with the title track. Mikael Wood of the Los Angeles Times found the album consistent with many of Strait's others, also stating that "as eager as Strait seems to reclaim his commercial clout, the album doesn’t downplay his perspective as an aging grandfather at a moment when country music is dominated by youngsters." His review also noted the "darker themes" of the "Old Violin" cover and "The Weight of the Badge". Kelly Dearmore of Sounds Like Nashville wrote that "Although there’s a range of slow, medium and quick tempo tunes here, the album excels when it’s either twisting and twirling in full-speed, or gently waltzing in a far lower gear." The review praised the lyrics of "Every Little Honky Tonk Bar" and "The Weight of the Badge", along with the performances on "Sing One with Willie", but criticized the lyrics of "Código" and "Blue Water". A review from Country Standard Time was also positive, with Jeffrey B. Remz stating that "The 13 songs are uniformly strong from start to finish."

== Commercial performance ==
Honky Tonk Time Machine debuted at number four on the US Billboard 200, with 51,000 album-equivalent units, including 44,000 pure album sales. It has sold 143,200 copies in the United States as of March 2020.

== Track listing ==
No.	Title	Writer(s)	Length
1.	"Every Little Honky Tonk Bar"	George Strait; Bubba Strait; Dean Dillon	3:14
2.	"Two More Wishes"	Jim Lauderdale; Odie Blackmon	2:59
3.	"Some Nights"	B. Strait; Brice Long; Phillip White	3:22
4.	"God and Country Music" (featuring Harvey Strait)	Luke Laird; Barry Dean; Lori McKenna	4:04
5.	"Blue Water"	G. Strait; B. Strait; Dillon	3:41
6.	"Sometimes Love"	G. Strait; B. Strait; Dillon	3:54
7.	"Código"	G. Strait; B. Strait; Dillon	3:13
8.	"Old Violin"	Johnny Paycheck	3:57
9.	"Take Me Away"	G. Strait; B. Strait; Dillon	2:57
10.	"The Weight of the Badge"	G. Strait; B. Strait; Dillon	3:46
11.	"Honky Tonk Time Machine"	B. Strait; Long; Bart Butler	2:44
12.	"What Goes Up"	G. Strait; B. Strait; Jeff Hyde	3:57
13.	"Sing One with Willie" (featuring Willie Nelson)	G. Strait; B. Strait; Willie Nelson; Buddy Cannon	4:21
Total length:			46:09

== Personnel ==
Adapted from liner notes.

Musicians

- George Strait – lead vocals
- Mike Rojas – pianos, organ, synthesizers, accordion
- J. T. Corenflos – electric guitar
- Brent Mason – electric guitar, gut-string guitar
- Mac McAnally – acoustic guitar, gut-string guitar
- Ilya Toshinsky – acoustic guitar (6)
- Paul Franklin – steel guitar
- Stuart Duncan – fiddle, mandolin
- Glenn Worf – bass guitar
- Greg Morrow – drums, percussion
- Eric Darken – percussion
- Wes Hightower – background vocals
- Marty Slayton – background vocals
- Harvey Strait – lead and additional vocals (4)
- Willie Nelson – lead vocals (13)

Production and Technical

- Brian White – A&R
- George Strait – producer
- Chuck Ainlay – producer, recording, mixing
- Brandon Schexnayder – recording assistant (1–5, 7–13)
- Kevin Boettger – recording assistant (6)
- Buddy Cannon and Steve Chadie – recording (Willie Nelson's vocals on "Sing One with Willie")
- Charlie Kramsky – recording assistant (Willie Nelson's vocals on "Sing One with Willie")
- Spencer Clarke – overdubs, mix assistant
- Jon Harter – overdubs
- Bob Ludwig – mastering at Gateway Mastering (Portland, Maine)
- Sarah Marie Burke – A&R production
- Brittany Hamlin – production coordinator
- Karen Naff – art direction
- Kera Jackson – art production
- Craig Allen – design
- David McClister – photography
- Erika Goldring – back cover photography
- Carol M. Highsmith Archive, Library of Congress – cover photography
- Erv Woolsey – management
- Dottie Oelhafen – management

== Charts ==
=== Weekly charts ===
Chart (2019)	Peak position
Australian Albums (ARIA)	80
Canadian Albums (Billboard)	93
US Billboard 200	4
US Top Country Albums (Billboard)	1

=== Year-end charts ===
Chart (2019)	Position
US Top Country Albums (Billboard)	41
