= Here for a Good Time =

Studio album by George Strait
- Released: September 6, 2011
- Studios: Shrimpboat Sound (Key West, Florida); Sound Stage (Nashville, Tennessee)
- Genre: Neotraditional country
- Length: 41:13
- Label: MCA Nashville
- Producers: Tony Brown, George Strait

George Strait chronology
Twang (2009)	Here for a Good Time (2011)	Icon (2011)

Singles from Here for a Good Time
- 1. "Here for a Good Time" Released: June 13, 2011; 2. "Love's Gonna Make It Alright" Released: November 7, 2011; 3. "Drinkin' Man" Released: April 30, 2012

Professional ratings
Aggregate scores
Source	Rating
Metacritic	(74/100)
Review scores
Source	Rating
AllMusic	3.5/5 stars
American Songwriter	3.5/5 stars
The Boston Globe	(positive)
Country Weekly	(favorable)
Entertainment Weekly	B+
Los Angeles Times	2.5/4 stars
The New York Times	(positive)
PopMatters	7/10 stars
Slant Magazine	3.5/5 stars
Taste of Country	4.5/5 stars
USA Today	3.5/4 stars

Here for a Good Time is the twenty-seventh studio album by American country music artist George Strait. It was released on September 6, 2011, via MCA Nashville. Strait co-produced the album with his long-time producer Tony Brown. The title track and lead-off single, "Here for a Good Time", co-written with son Bubba and songwriter Dean Dillon, was released in June 2011. The album sold 91,414 copies in its first week. On November 30, 2011, the album received a nomination at the 54th Grammy Awards for Best Country Album.

== Content ==
Strait co-wrote seven of the album's eleven tracks with his son, Bubba Strait, and songwriter Dean Dillon. "Here for a Good Time," the lead single, debuted at number 29 on the Billboard Hot Country Songs chart, making the second-highest debut of his career.

Here for a Good Time was recorded at Shrimpboat Sound Studio in Key West, Florida, the same studio where Strait recorded his last three albums.

"Lone Star Blues" was originally recorded by Delbert McClinton on his 2002 album, Room to Breathe. "A Showman's Life" was originally recorded by the songwriter, Jesse Winchester, on his 1978 album, A Touch on the Rainy Side and by Gary Allan on his 2003 album, See If I Care.

== Track listing ==
No.	Title	Writer(s)	Length
1.	"Love's Gonna Make It Alright"	Al Anderson, Chris Stapleton	3:50
2.	"Drinkin' Man"	Dean Dillon, Bubba Strait, George Strait	4:27
3.	"Shame On Me"	B. Strait, G. Strait	2:39
4.	"Poison"	Chuck Cannon, Allen Shamblin	3:39
5.	"Here for a Good Time"	Dillon, B. Strait, G. Strait	3:01
6.	"House Across the Bay"	Dillon, B. Strait, G. Strait	3:36
7.	"Lone Star Blues"	Gary Nicholson, Delbert McClinton	4:18
8.	"A Showman’s Life" (featuring Faith Hill)	Jesse Winchester	4:43
9.	"Three Nails and a Cross"	Bobby Boyd, Dillon, B. Strait, G. Strait	3:43
10.	"Blue Marlin Blues"	Dillon, B. Strait, G. Strait	3:24
11.	"I’ll Always Remember You"	Dillon, B. Strait, G. Strait	3:54
Total length:			41:13

== Personnel ==
- George Strait – lead vocals, backing vocals, acoustic guitar
- Steve Nathan – acoustic piano, Hammond B3 organ, synthesizers
- Matt Rollings – acoustic piano, Wurlitzer electric piano, Hammond B3 organ
- Steve Gibson – acoustic guitar, electric guitar, gut-string guitar
- Brent Mason – acoustic guitar, electric guitar, gut-string guitar
- Ilya Toshinsky – acoustic guitar, electric guitar
- Paul Franklin – steel guitar
- Stuart Duncan – fiddle, mandolin
- Glenn Worf – bass guitar, upright bass
- Eddie Bayers – drums
- Thom Flora – backing vocals
- Wes Hightower – backing vocals
- Marty Slayton – backing vocals
- Chris Stapleton – backing vocals
- Faith Hill – backing vocals (8)

=== Production ===
- Brian White – A&R
- Tony Brown – producer
- George Strait – producer
- Chuck Ainlay – recording, mixing, additional recording
- Jim Cooley – recording assistant
- Brandon Schexnayder – additional recording, mix assistant
- Brian David Willis – digital editing
- Bob Ludwig – mastering at Gateway Mastering (Portland, Maine)
- Amy Garges – production assistant
- Craig Allen – design
- Terry Calonge – photography
- Kelley Fromme-May – booklet back cover photography
- Vanessa Gavalya – inside front and back cover photography
- Erv Woolsey – management

== Chart positions ==
Here for a Good Time debuted at No.3 on the Billboard 200 chart and No.1 on the Country Albums chart with 91,000 copies. As of December 21, 2011, the album had sold 298k copies.

=== Weekly charts ===
Chart (2011)	Peak position
Canadian Albums (Billboard)	12
UK Country Albums (Official Charts)	5
US Billboard 200	3
US Top Country Albums (Billboard)	1

=== Year-end charts ===
Chart (2011)	Position
US Billboard 200	129
US Top Country Albums (Billboard)	29
Chart (2012)	Position
US Top Country Albums (Billboard)	39

=== Singles ===
Year	Single	Peak chart positions		
Year	Single	US Country	US	CAN
2011	"Here for a Good Time"	2	46	66
2011	"Love's Gonna Make It Alright"	3	61	—
2012	"Drinkin' Man"	37	—	—
"—" denotes releases that did not chart

== Certifications ==
Certifications for Here For A Good Time
Region	Certification	Certified units/sales
United States (RIAA)	Gold	500,000^{‡}
^{‡} Sales+streaming figures based on certification alone.
