= Ocean Front Property =

Studio album by George Strait
- Released: January 12, 1987
- Recorded: September 1986
- Studio: Sound Stage Studios (Nashville, Tennessee)
- Genre: Neotraditional country
- Length: 29:55
- Label: MCA; MCAD-5913
- Producer: Jimmy Bowen; George Strait

George Strait chronology
| Merry Christmas Strait to You! (1986) | Ocean Front Property (1987) | Greatest Hits Volume Two (1987) |

Singles from Ocean Front Property
- 1. "Ocean Front Property" Released: December 22, 1986; 2. "All My Ex's Live in Texas" Released: April 10, 1987; 3. "Am I Blue" Released: August 3, 1987

Professional ratings
Review scores
| Source | Rating |
|---|---|
| Allmusic | 4.5/5 stars |
| Chicago Tribune | (favorable) |

Ocean Front Property is the seventh studio album by American country music artist George Strait, released on January 12, 1987, by MCA Records. It is certified 2× Multi-platinum by the RIAA. It is the first album to debut at #1 on the Billboard Top Country Albums Chart. It was ranked #5 on CMT's list of 40 Greatest Albums in Country Music in 2006.

== Track listing ==
| No. | Title | Writer(s) | Length |
|---|---|---|---|
| 1. | "All My Ex's Live in Texas" | Sanger D. Shafer, Lyndia J. Shafer | 3:17 |
| 2. | "Someone's Walkin' Around Upstairs" | David Anthony, Paul A. Maloy | 2:47 |
| 3. | "Am I Blue" | David Chamberlain | 3:04 |
| 4. | "Ocean Front Property" | Dean Dillon, Hank Cochran, Royce Porter | 3:06 |
| 5. | "Hot Burning Flames" | Cochran, Mack Vickery, Wayne Kemp | 2:19 |
| 6. | "Without You Here" | Dillon, Porter | 4:30 |
| 7. | "My Heart Won't Wander Very Far from You" | Annette Cotter, Buddy Carvalhe | 2:21 |
| 8. | "Second Chances" | S. Shafer, Tommy Collins | 4:13 |
| 9. | "You Can't Buy Your Way Out of the Blues" | Larry Cordle, Mike Anthony | 2:49 |
| 10. | "I'm All Behind You Now" | Dillon | 3:13 |
| Total length: | | | 29:55 |

== Personnel ==
Per liner notes.

Tracks 1–4 & 6–10

- George Strait – lead vocals
- John Barlow Jarvis – piano
- Richard Bennett – acoustic guitar
- Larry Byrom – electric guitar
- Billy Joe Walker Jr. – electric guitar
- Reggie Young – electric guitar
- Paul Franklin – pedal steel guitar
- Johnny Gimble – fiddle, mandolin
- Leland Sklar – bass guitar
- Owen Hale – drums
- Curtis Young – harmony vocals

Ace in the Hole Band (Track 5)

- George Strait – vocals
- Ronnie Huckaby – piano
- David Anthony – acoustic guitar
- Benny McArthur – electric guitar
- Rick McRae – electric guitar
- Mike Daily – steel guitar
- Terry Hale – bass guitar
- Phillip Farjado – drums
- Gene Elders – fiddle

Production

- Jimmy Bowen – producer
- George Strait – producer
- Steve Tillisch – recording, mixing
- Chuck Ainlay – overdub recording
- Willie Pevear – overdub recording
- Tim Kish – second engineer
- Marty Williams – second engineer
- Glenn Meadows – mastering at Masterfonics (Nashville, Tennessee)
- Jessie Noble – project coordinator
- Simon Levy – art direction
- Mickey Braithwaite – design
- Jerry Smith – photography
- Erv Woolsey – management

== Chart positions ==
| Chart (1987) | Peak position |
|---|---|
| U.S. Billboard Top Country Albums | 1 |
| U.S. Billboard 200 | 117 |

== Certifications ==
Certifications for Ocean Front Property
| Region | Certification | Certified units/sales |
|---|---|---|
| Canada (Music Canada) | Gold | 50,000^{^} |
| United States (RIAA) | 2× Platinum | 2,000,000^{^} |
^{^} Shipments figures based on certification alone.
