= If You Ain't Lovin' (You Ain't Livin') =

Single by Faron Young

from the album This Is Faron Young
- A-side: "If That's the Fashion"
- Released: October 26, 1954
- Recorded: 1954
- Genre: Country
- Length: 2:34
- Label: Capitol
- Songwriter: Tommy Collins

Faron Young singles chronology
"A Place for Girls Like You" (1954)	"If You Ain't Lovin' (You Ain't Livin')" (1954)	"Live Fast, Love Hard, Die Young" (1955)

"If You Ain't Lovin' (You Ain't Livin')" is a song written by Tommy Collins and originally recorded by country music artist Faron Young.

== George Strait version ==
"If You Ain't Lovin' (You Ain't Livin')"

Single by George Strait

from the album If You Ain't Lovin', You Ain't Livin'
- B-side: "Is It That Time Again"
- Released: August 22, 1988
- Recorded: September 30, 1987
- Genre: Honky-tonk
- Length: 2:17
- Label: MCA 53400
- Songwriter: Tommy Collins
- Producers: Jimmy Bowen & George Strait

George Strait singles chronology
"Baby Blue" (1988)	"If You Ain't Lovin' (You Ain't Livin')" (1988)	"Baby's Gotten Good at Goodbye" (1988)

It was also covered by George Strait on his 1988 album If You Ain't Lovin', You Ain't Livin'. His version became his 15th number 1 single in the U.S.

== Critical reception ==
Kevin John Coyne of Country Universe gave the song a B− grade, saying that it "features Strait singing in such an exaggerated twang that the entire proceedings feel more campy than country."

== Chart performance ==
"If You Ain't Lovin'" reached number two for three weeks on the Billboard Hot Country Songs chart for Faron Young in 1954.

George Strait's version was a chart topper in 1988, his eighth consecutive single to do so.

=== Faron Young ===
Chart (1954–1955)	Peak position
US Hot Country Songs (Billboard)	2

=== George Strait ===
Chart (1988)	Peak position
US Hot Country Songs (Billboard)	1
Canadian RPM Country Tracks	1
