= The Breath You Take =

Single by George Strait

from the album Twang
- Released: July 12, 2010
- Genre: Country
- Length: 3:35
- Label: MCA Nashville
- Songwriters: Dean Dillon; Jessie Jo Dillon; Casey Beathard
- Producers: Tony Brown; George Strait

George Strait singles chronology
"I Gotta Get to You" (2010)	"The Breath You Take" (2010)	"Here for a Good Time" (2011)

"The Breath You Take" is a Grammy nominated song recorded by American country music artist George Strait, and the fourth single from his album Twang. It was released on July 12, 2010 as the 91st single of his career. It was written by veteran songwriter Dean Dillon, his daughter Jessie Jo Dillon, and Casey Beathard. It became his 83rd Top 10 hit on the Country charts. On November 10, 2010, Strait performed the song live on the CMA Awards. It received a 2011 Grammy Awards nomination in the "Best Country Song" category on December 1, 2010.

== Content ==
The song is about savoring and realizing the important moments in life, whether they be large or small. The story is told through fatherly love, starting by giving examples from the baseball field of a boy's youth and moving to the more emotionally jarring times, birth and death.

== Critical reception ==
The song has been widely popular amongst listeners, but has received mixed reviews. The Washington Times called it overly "maudlin." A review in the Houston Chronicle said, "try and keep your eyes dry" while listening to the song.

== Chart performance ==
The song debuted at number 58 on the U.S. Billboard Hot Country Songs chart for the week of July 3, 2010, two weeks before its official release date of July 12, 2010. It peaked at number 6 on the country chart dated January 15, 2011.

Chart (2010–2011)	Peak position
US Hot Country Songs (Billboard)	6
US Billboard Hot 100	63
Canada Country (Billboard)	10
Canada Hot 100 (Billboard)	90

=== Year-end charts ===
Chart (2010)	Position
US Country Songs (Billboard)	50

Chart (2011)	Position
US Country Songs (Billboard)	68
