= Baby Blue (George Strait song) =

Single by George Strait

from the album If You Ain't Lovin' You Ain't Livin'
- B-side: "Back to Bein' Me"
- Released: April 25, 1988
- Recorded: September 29, 1987
- Genre: Countrypolitan
- Length: 3:32
- Label: MCA 53340
- Songwriter(s): Aaron Barker
- Producer(s): Jimmy Bowen, George Strait

George Strait singles chronology
"Famous Last Words of a Fool" (1988)	"Baby Blue" (1988)	"If You Ain't Lovin' (You Ain't Livin')" (1988)

"Baby Blue" is a song written by Aaron Barker, and recorded by American country music artist George Strait. It was released in April 1988 as the second single from his album If You Ain't Lovin' You Ain't Livin'. It was a number-one hit in the United States, while it peaked at number 3 in Canada.

== Critical reception ==
Kevin John Coyne of Country Universe gave the song an A, calling it "another one of Strait’s smoothest pop performances, with just enough country touches in the production to keep his traditionalist credentials intact." Coyne states that "taken literally as a love gone wrong song, it’s a beautiful piece of work."

== Charts ==
=== Weekly charts ===
Chart (1988)	Peak positions
Canada Country Tracks (RPM)	3
US Hot Country Songs (Billboard)	1

=== Year-end charts ===
Chart (1988)	Position
Canadian RPM Country Tracks	58
US Hot Country Songs (Billboard)	32

== Certifications ==
Region	Certification	Certified units/sales
United States (RIAA)	Gold	500,000^{‡}
^{‡} Sales+streaming figures based on certification alone.
