= Strait from the Heart =

Studio album by George Strait
- Released: June 3, 1982
- Recorded: September 1981 – April 1982
- Studio: Music City Music Hall (Nashville, Tennessee)
- Genre: Neotraditional country; honky-tonk; countrypolitan
- Length: 28:45
- Label: MCA
- Producer: Blake Mevis

George Strait chronology
Strait Country (1981)	Strait from the Heart (1982)	Right or Wrong (1983)

Singles from Strait from the Heart
- 1. "Fool Hearted Memory" Released: May 27, 1982; 2. "Marina del Rey" Released: September 16, 1982; 3. "Amarillo by Morning" Released: January 14, 1983; 4. "A Fire I Can't Put Out" Released: May 19, 1983

Strait from the Heart is the second studio album by American country music artist George Strait, released on June 3, 1982, by MCA Records. The album includes Strait's first No. 1 single, "Fool Hearted Memory", as well as follow-up singles "Marina del Rey", "Amarillo by Morning" and "A Fire I Can't Put Out", reaching No. 6, No. 4, and No. 1 respectively on the Billboard Hot Country Singles chart. The album peaked at No. 18 on the US Billboard Top Country Albums chart. Strait from the Heart is certified platinum by the RIAA.

There were three cover songs on the album: "Honky Tonk Crazy", which had been released a couple of months earlier in 1982 by the duo of Gary Stewart and Dean Dillon on their Brotherly Love album; 2) the Guy Clark song, "Heartbroke", which was first recorded by Rodney Crowell on his 1980 album, But What Will the Neighbors Think; and 3) "Amarillo by Morning" which was first recorded by Terry Stafford in 1973.

"The Only Thing I Have Left" was later recorded by Tim McGraw for his 1993 self-titled debut album.

== Recording ==
Strait from the Heart was recorded at Music City Music Hall in Nashville, Tennessee. The album was recorded and mixed digitally.

== Musical style and composition ==
Strait from the Heart is a neotraditional country, honky-tonk, and countrypolitan album that continues the styles of Strait's debut album Strait Country. The album also has musical elements of Western swing.

== Reception ==
Professional ratings
Review scores
Source	Rating
AllMusic	5/5 stars

Strait from the Heart received positive reviews upon its release in 1982. On the music review website AllMusic, it received five out of five stars. In his review for AllMusic, Thom Jurek called Strait "a singer of uncommon vitality who could sing honky-tonk, countrypolitan, and the new traditional sounds". Jurek singled out the depth and breadth of the singer's talent, delivering his first number one hit, "Fool Hearted Memory", a slow two-step, alongside the equally successful ballads "Amarillo by Morning", "Marina del Rey", and "A Fire I Can't Put Out", as well as the raw traditional numbers "Honky Tonk Crazy", "Heartbroke", "I Can't See Texas from Here", and the barroom anthem "The Steal of the Night"—songs that "offer a portrait of Strait as a man who can do it all". Jurek concludes:

His work is not over-produced, and his voice rings clear and true, offering only what the song needs to reveal itself to the listener. Strait from the Heart may not be the exact beginning of the story, but it is the first part of the legend.

In 2022, Rolling Stone ranked the album 19 on its 100 Greatest Country Albums of All Time publication.

The album contained the songs "Amarillo by Morning", voted by Rolling Stone readers as their favorite Strait song, and "Fool Hearted Memory", Strait's first number 1 on the Billboard Hot Country Singles chart.

== Track listing ==
Side One
No.	Title	Writer(s)	Length
1.	"Fool Hearted Memory"	Byron Hill; Blake Mevis	2:40
2.	"Honky Tonk Crazy"	Dean Dillon; Frank Dycus	2:29
3.	"The Only Thing I Have Left"	Clay Blaker	3:28
4.	"The Steal of the Night"	Mevis; Bill Shore; David Wills	2:40
5.	"I Can't See Texas from Here"	George Strait	2:29

Side Two
No.	Title	Writer(s)	Length
6.	"Marina del Rey"	Dillon; Dycus	3:03
7.	"Lover in Disguise"	Mevis; Jim Dowell	2:30
8.	"Heartbroke"	Guy Clark	3:34
9.	"Amarillo by Morning"	Terry Stafford; Paul Fraser	2:53
10.	"A Fire I Can't Put Out"	Darryl Staedtler	3:00
Total length:			28:45

== Personnel ==
Musicians

- George Strait – lead vocals, acoustic guitar
- Mitch Humphries – keyboards
- Gregg Galbraith – lead guitar
- Fred Newell – lead guitar
- Jimmy Capps – rhythm guitar
- Bobby Thompson – rhythm guitar
- Steve Chapman – acoustic guitar (1)
- Dave Kirby – acoustic guitar (1)
- Sonny Garrish – steel guitar
- John Hughey – steel guitar
- Mike Leech – bass guitar
- Larry Paxton – bass guitar
- Clyde Brooks – drums (1)
- Jerry Kroon – drums (2–10)
- Mark Feldman – fiddle (1)
- Rob Hajacos – fiddle
- Buddy Spicher – fiddle
- The Nashville String Machine – strings
- Alan Moore – string arrangements
- Sudie Callaway – background vocals
- Buddy Cannon – background vocals
- Rita Figlio – background vocals
- Arlene Harden – background vocals
- Bobby Harden – background vocals
- Gwen Kay – background vocals
- Curtis Young – background vocals

Production

- Blake Mevis – producer
- Bill Harris – engineer, mixing
- Doug Crider – assistant engineer
- David DeBusk – assistant engineer
- Milan Bogdan – digital editing (CD)
- Glenn Meadows – digital mastering (CD)
- Simon Levy – art direction
- Jim McGuire – photography
- Katie Gillon – coordination
- Sherri Halford – coordination

== Chart positions ==
Chart (1982)	Peak position
U.S. Billboard Top Country Albums	18

== Certifications ==
Certifications for Strait from the Heart
Region	Certification	Certified units/sales
United States (RIAA)	Platinum	1,000,000^{^}
^{^} Shipments figures based on certification alone.
