= Living for the Night =

Single by George Strait

from the album Twang
- Released: May 28, 2009
- Genre: Country
- Length: 3:47
- Label: MCA Nashville
- Songwriters: Dean Dillon; Bubba Strait; George Strait
- Producers: Tony Brown; George Strait

George Strait singles chronology
"River of Love" (2008)	"Living for the Night" (2009)	"Twang" (2009)

"Living for the Night" is a song co-written and recorded by American country music singer George Strait. Written by Strait with his son, Bubba, and Dean Dillon, it is the 88th single release of his career, and the first single that Strait has co-written. It was released in May 2009 as the first single from his album Twang. The song was released to radio on May 28, 2009, one day after CBS aired a George Strait tribute show in which other musical artists performed covers of his songs. "Living for the Night" was nominated for Best Male Country Vocal Performance at the 2010 Grammy Awards.

== Background and writing ==
Strait and his son, George "Bubba" Strait, Jr., wrote the song with Dean Dillon, who has also written several of Strait's other singles. It is the first single release in Strait's solo career that he has had a hand in co-writing, and only the second song of his entire solo career that he has had a hand in writing that was used on one of his albums (the first being the self-penned "I Can't See Texas from Here", a cut from his 1982 album Strait from the Heart). Earlier songwriting efforts from Strait, such as "I Just Can't Go On Dyin' Like This," were recorded before he signed to MCA and were eventually released on the Strait Out of the Box boxed set.

== Content ==
In the song, the male narrator expresses his feelings after having lost an unspecified person in his life ("Every day is a lifetime without you / Hard to get through since you've gone"). He then goes on to say that he is "living for the night" so that he can go to a bar during the nighttime, and drink whiskey to forget his problems. The song is accompanied by classical guitar, pedal steel guitar and a string section.

== Critical reception ==
Matt Bjorke of Roughstock gave the song a favorable review. He said that the song was "one of the best songs that George's released this past year." Bjorke also said that the idea behind the song may have been inspired by the loss of Strait's daughter, Jenifer, in an automobile accident several years previous. Stephen Thomas Erlewine, in his Allmusic review of the album, called it a "terrific tear-in-my-beer single."

== Music video ==
Shaun Silva directed the song's music video, which is footage of a live performance. It made its debut on CMT.com on August 28, 2009.

== Chart performance ==
On the charts dated for the week of June 13, 2009, "Living for the Night" was the highest-debuting single, or "Hot Shot Debut", on the Billboard Hot Country Songs charts, entering at number 34.

Chart (2009)	Peak position
US Hot Country Songs (Billboard)	2
US Billboard Hot 100	53
Canada Country (Billboard)	4
Canada Hot 100 (Billboard)	72

=== Year-end charts ===
Chart (2009)	Position
US Country Songs (Billboard)	21
