= I Gotta Get to You =

Single by George Strait

from the album Twang
- Released: February 16, 2010
- Genre: Country
- Length: 3:10
- Label: MCA Nashville
- Songwriters: Blaine Larsen; Jim Lauderdale; Jimmy Ritchey
- Producers: Tony Brown; George Strait

George Strait singles chronology
"Twang" (2009)	"I Gotta Get to You" (2010)	"The Breath You Take" (2010)

"I Gotta Get to You" is a song written Blaine Larsen, Jim Lauderdale and Jimmy Ritchey, and recorded by American country music artist George Strait. It was released in February 2010 as the 90th single of his career, as well as the third single from his album Twang. The single debuted at #57 on the Billboard Hot Country Songs charts for the week of January 16, 2010, at the time his previous single, "Twang," was still on the charts.

== Content ==
The song's narrator wants to romance his lover, saying to her, "I gotta get to you, 'cause you sure been gettin' to me".

== Critical reception ==
Roughstock reviewer Allen Jacobs' review focuses on how Strait's previous single, "Twang," missed the Top Ten, saying that the song will "return him to his home in the Top Ten."

== Charts ==
=== Weekly charts ===
Chart (2010)	Peak position
Canada Country (Billboard)	4
US Hot Country Songs (Billboard)	3
US Billboard Hot 100	70

=== Year-end charts ===
Chart (2010)	Position
US Country Songs (Billboard)	40
