= Famous Last Words of a Fool =

Single by George Strait

from the album If You Ain't Lovin', You Ain't Livin'
- B-side: "It's Too Late Now"
- Released: January 11, 1988
- Recorded: September 30, 1987
- Genre: Honky-tonk
- Length: 3:37 (album version); 3:19 (single edit)
- Label: MCA 53248
- Songwriters: Dean Dillon, Rex Huston
- Producers: Jimmy Bowen, George Strait

George Strait singles chronology
"Am I Blue" (1987)	"Famous Last Words of a Fool" (1988)	"Baby Blue" (1988)

"Famous Last Words of a Fool" is a song written by Dean Dillon and Rex Huston, and recorded by American country music artist George Strait. It was released in January 1988 as the first single from his album If You Ain't Lovin', You Ain't Livin'.

The song was originally recorded by Dillon, whose version peaked at number 67 on Billboard's Hot Country Singles & Tracks chart in 1983.

== Critical reception ==
Kevin John Coyne of Country Universe gave the song a B− grade, calling it "a solid song, but Strait’s performance is oddly distant, and he sings it in a register that’s slightly too low." Lorie Liebig of The Boot referred to the song as a "Strait classic" and a "honky-tonk tearjerker."

== Chart performance ==
=== Dean Dillon ===
Chart (1983)	Peak position
US Hot Country Songs (Billboard)	67

=== George Strait ===
Chart (1988)	Peak position
US Hot Country Songs (Billboard)	1
Canadian RPM Country Tracks	1

=== Year-end charts ===
Chart (1988)	Position
Canadian RPM Country Tracks	55
US Hot Country Songs (Billboard)	46
