= Love's Gonna Make It Alright =

Single by George Strait

from the album Here for a Good Time
- Released: November 7, 2011
- Genre: Neotraditional country
- Length: 3:50
- Label: MCA Nashville
- Songwriters: Al Anderson; Chris Stapleton
- Producers: Tony Brown; George Strait

George Strait singles chronology
"Here for a Good Time" (2011)	"Love's Gonna Make It Alright" (2011)	"Drinkin' Man" (2012)

"Love's Gonna Make It Alright" is a song written by Al Anderson and Chris Stapleton and recorded by American country music singer George Strait. It was released in November 2011 as the second single from his album Here for a Good Time.

== Critical reception ==
Billy Dukes of Taste of Country rated the song four stars out of five, saying that "the easy, mid-tempo swinger is another in a long line of hits that gives one no reason to turn down the radio. Strait is a master at modifying his traditional approach just enough to make it still sound plenty modern."

Ben Foster of The 1-to-10 County Music Review rated the song seven out of ten and states, "where the single goes right is in creating the perfect mood and backdrop for its straightforward story. Smooth fiddling and steel picking give the song a vintage flavor that sounds strongly reminiscent of Strait’s beloved nineties hits such as 'Write This Down' and 'Check Yes or No'."

== Chart performance ==
"Love's Gonna Make It Alright" debuted at number 57 on the Hot Country Songs charts. It also debuted at number 99 on the U.S. Billboard Hot 100 chart for the week of February 4, 2012.

Chart (2011–2012)	Peak position
Canada Country (Billboard)	6
US Billboard Hot 100	61
US Hot Country Songs (Billboard)	3

=== Year-end charts ===
Chart (2012)	Position
US Country Songs (Billboard)	42
