= Here for a Good Time (song) =

Single by George Strait

from the album Here for a Good Time
- Released: June 13, 2011
- Genre: Neotraditional country
- Length: 3:02
- Label: MCA Nashville
- Songwriter: George Strait; Bubba Strait; Dean Dillon
- Producer: Tony Brown; George Strait

George Strait singles chronology
"The Breath You Take" (2010)	"Here for a Good Time" (2011)	"Love's Gonna Make It Alright" (2011)

"Here for a Good Time" is a song co-written and recorded by American country music singer George Strait. It was released in June 2011 as the 92nd single of his career, and the first single and title track from the album of the same name. He and his son, Bubba, co-wrote it with Dean Dillon, who has also co-written several of Strait's other hits.

== Live ==
George used this as the lead song for the Here for a Good Time tour.

== Critical reception ==
Billy Dukes of Taste of Country rated the song four stars out of five, saying that its "uptempo shuffle fits right in with what Strait has done musically over the last five years."

== Chart performance ==
"Here for a Good Time" debuted at number 29 on the Hot Country Songs charts, making the second-highest debut of his career. It became Strait's 84th Top 10 single on the country chart in September 2011. It peaked at number 2 for the chart week of October 29, behind Blake Shelton's "God Gave Me You."

Chart (2011)	Peak position
US Hot Country Songs (Billboard)	2
US Billboard Hot 100	46
Canada Country (Billboard)	2
Canada Hot 100 (Billboard)	66

=== Year-end charts ===
Chart (2011)	Position
US Country Songs (Billboard)	11

== Certifications ==
Region	Certification	Certified units/sales
United States (RIAA)	2× Platinum	2,000,000^{‡}
^{‡} Sales+streaming figures based on certification alone.
