= Am I Blue (George Strait song) =

Single by George Strait

from the album Ocean Front Property
- B-side: "Someone's Walkin' Around Upstairs"
- Released: August 3, 1987
- Recorded: September 23, 1986
- Genre: Western swing, country jazz
- Length: 3:07
- Label: MCA 53165
- Songwriter: David Chamberlain
- Producers: Jimmy Bowen & George Strait

George Strait singles chronology
"All My Ex's Live in Texas" (1987)	"Am I Blue" (1987)	"Famous Last Words of a Fool" (1988)

"Am I Blue" is a song written by David Chamberlain, and recorded by American country music artist George Strait. It was released in August 1987 as the third and final single from his album Ocean Front Property. It became his 12th number 1 single in the U.S.

== Critical reception ==
Kevin John Coyne of Country Universe gave the song a B+ grade, saying that it "revels in his Western swing roots." He goes on to say that "the contemporary production makes it timely, but the arrangements and vocal performance make it timeless."

== Charts ==
Chart (1987)	Peak position
Canada Country Tracks (RPM)	1
US Hot Country Songs (Billboard)	1
