= If You're Thinking You Want a Stranger (There's One Coming Home) =

Single by George Strait

from the album Strait Country
- B-side: "Her Goodbye Hit Me In the Heart"
- Released: January 7, 1982
- Recorded: June 16, 1981
- Genre: Country
- Length: 2:55
- Label: MCA (51104)
- Songwriter(s): Blake Mevis; David Wills
- Producer(s): Blake Mevis

George Strait singles chronology
"Down and Out" (1981)	"If You're Thinking You Want a Stranger (There's One Coming Home)" (1982)	"Fool Hearted Memory" (1982)

"If You're Thinking You Want a Stranger (There's One Coming Home)" is a song written by Blake Mevis and David Wills, and recorded by American country music artist George Strait. It was released in January 1982 as the third and final single from his debut album Strait Country. It peaked at #3 in the United States on the Billboard Country Singles Chart (#1 on Cashbox), while it was a #2 in Canada.

== Critical reception ==
Kevin John Coyne of Country Universe gave the song a B− grade, saying that if Strait's voice wasn't so "distinctive and familiar, you could be forgiven for mistaking this for Johnny Lee’s, "Lookin' for Love." Billboard reviewed the song favorably, saying that "Strait's got another winner in this lively promise of changing ways."

== Charts ==
=== Weekly charts ===
Chart (1982)	Peak position
US Hot Country Songs (Billboard)	3
Canadian RPM Country Tracks	2

=== Year-end charts ===
Chart (1982)	Position
US Hot Country Songs (Billboard)	8
