= A Fire I Can't Put Out =

Single by George Strait

from the album Strait from the Heart
- B-side: "Honky Tonk Crazy"
- Released: May 19, 1983
- Recorded: January 11, 1982
- Studio: Music City Music Hall (Nashville, Tennessee)
- Genre: Country
- Length: 3:00
- Label: MCA 52225
- Songwriter(s): Darryl Staedtler
- Producer(s): Blake Mevis

George Strait singles chronology
"Amarillo by Morning" (1983)	"A Fire I Can't Put Out" (1983)	"You Look So Good in Love" (1983)

"A Fire I Can't Put Out" is a song written by Darryl Staedtler, and recorded by American country music singer George Strait. It was released in May 1983 as the fourth and final single from his album Strait from the Heart. It was Strait's second Number One hit on the Billboard country charts.

== Content ==
The narrator is a guy that can't let the memory of a woman escape him. He can't let go of the feeling that felt so good when he was with her. He knows he has to move on and find someone new, but he just can't let the fire that burns for his former lover go.

== Charts ==
=== Weekly charts ===
Chart (1983)	Peak position
US Hot Country Songs (Billboard)	1
Canadian RPM Country Tracks Chart	2

=== Year-end charts ===
Chart (1983)	Position
US Hot Country Songs (Billboard)	5
