= It Ain't Cool to Be Crazy About You =

Single by George Strait

from the album #7
- B-side: "Rhythm of the Road"
- Released: August 25, 1986
- Recorded: January 28, 1986
- Genre: Country
- Length: 2:52 (album version); 2:38 (single edit)
- Label: MCA 52914
- Songwriters: Dean Dillon, Royce Porter
- Producers: Jimmy Bowen & George Strait

George Strait singles chronology
"Nobody in His Right Mind Would've Left Her" (1986)	"It Ain't Cool to Be Crazy About You" (1986)	"Ocean Front Property" (1986)

"It Ain't Cool to Be Crazy About You" is a song written by Dean Dillon and Royce Porter, and recorded by American country music artist George Strait. It was released in August 1986 as the second and final single from his album #7. "It Ain't Cool to Be Crazy About You" was his 9th #1 single.

== Content ==
The narrator is a man who believed that his relationship was special but now at the end of it he now realized he was played as a fool. He recognizes his errors and how he shouldn't of gave her his heart and that he wished he listened to his friends. Throughout the song he emphasizes on how much it hurt to be crazy in love with her and he shouldn't have been so reckless with his heart.

== Critical reception ==
Leeann Ward of Country Universe gave the song an A grade, saying that "hearing the first strains of the simple piano intro makes it almost impossible to get the tune out of your head once it’s there." She goes on to say that Strait’s "delivery of a mix of sadness and regret, with a hint of frustration, turns this song into something substantive with a relatable scenario."

== Cover version ==
Kenny Chesney has recorded a version of this song. It was only available as a B-side for his "Never Wanted Nothing More" in 2007.

== Charts ==
"It Ain't Cool" reached number 1 on the Billboard Hot Country Songs chart and number 5 on the Canadian RPM Country Tracks chart.

=== Weekly charts ===
Chart (1986)	Peak position
US Hot Country Songs (Billboard)	1
Canadian RPM Country Tracks	5

=== Year-end charts ===
Chart (1987)	Position
US Hot Country Songs (Billboard)	34
