= The Chair (song) =

Single by George Strait

from the album Something Special
- B-side: "In Too Deep"
- Released: August 26, 1985
- Recorded: February 28, 1985
- Genre: Country, honky-tonk
- Length: 2:51
- Label: MCA 52667
- Songwriters: Hank Cochran, Dean Dillon
- Producers: Jimmy Bowen & George Strait

George Strait singles chronology
"The Fireman" (1985)	"The Chair" (1985)	"You're Something Special to Me" (1985)

"The Chair" is a song written by Hank Cochran and Dean Dillon and recorded by American country music artist George Strait. It was released in August 1985 as the first single from Strait's album Something Special. The song reached number one on the country music charts in both the United States and Canada in 1985. The song was named by CMT as one of the Top 100 country songs of all time, posting at number 24 on that list. Something that sets "The Chair" apart for most other songs of any style - it has no refrain or chorus. Only the basic melody repeats throughout the song.

== Background and writing ==
"The Chair" came at the end of a night-long songwriting binge by country music songwriters, Hank Cochran and Dean Dillon. The two had been writing songs all night long and as Dillon puts it, "were about written out" - when he strummed his guitar and sang the line "Excuse me but I think you've got my chair." Twenty minutes later, "The Chair" was complete.

== Content ==
The lyrics represent a conversation between a man and a woman at a dance club, but only the man's side of the conversation is revealed. At the beginning he says, "Well excuse me, but I think you've got my chair." Over the course of the conversation, the talk grows more intimate, until the woman agrees to let the man drive her home. At the end he says, "Oh I like you too, and to tell you the truth, that wasn't my chair after all."

== Critical reception ==
"The Chair" is widely considered one of Strait's greatest songs. Billboard and American Songwriter ranked the song number one and number three, respectively, on their lists of the 10 greatest George Strait songs. In 2024, Rolling Stone ranked the song at #124 on its 200 Greatest Country Songs of All Time ranking.

Kevin John Coyne of Country Universe gave the song an A grade, saying that "there isn't a hat act out there who could measure up to Strait’s delivery of this song." He went on by saying that "the song remains fresh and interesting even after you know the twist at the end" and that is the "hallmark of a great storyteller."

== Music video ==
The music video was George Strait's second music video, and was directed by Marc Ball.

== Chart positions ==
=== Weekly charts ===
Chart (1985)	Peak position
US Hot Country Songs (Billboard)	1
Canadian RPM Country Tracks	1

=== Year-end charts ===
Chart (1986)	Position
US Hot Country Songs (Billboard)	38

== Certifications ==
Certifications for The Chair
Region	Certification	Certified units/sales
United States (RIAA)	Platinum	1,000,000^{‡}
^{‡} Sales+streaming figures based on certification alone.
