= Unwound (song) =

Single by George Strait

from the album Strait Country
- B-side: "She's Playing Hell Trying to Get Me to Heaven"
- Released: April 23, 1981
- Recorded: February 2, 1981
- Genre: Neotraditional country; honky-tonk; Texas swing; Western swing; Texas country
- Length: 2:24
- Label: MCA (51104)
- Songwriters: Dean Dillon; Frank Dycus
- Producer: Blake Mevis

George Strait singles chronology
"Unwound" (1981)	"Down and Out" (1981)

"Unwound" is a song written by Dean Dillon and Frank Dycus, and recorded by American country music artist George Strait. It was released in April 1981 as his major label debut single and served as the lead single from his debut album Strait Country. It peaked at No. 6 on the United States Billboard Hot Country Singles chart and is Strait's first top-ten hit.

== Background ==
Dean Dillon and Frank Dycus originally wrote the song for Johnny Paycheck, but Paycheck was in jail at the time. Record producer Blake Mevis drove over to Dillon's house in 1980, where Dillon and Dycus were writing songs on the front porch, and asked them if they had any new songs for a 'new kid from Texas.' Since Paycheck would not be using it, they gave the song to Mevis for George Strait. Dillon has gone on to write or co-write over 60 songs that have been recorded by Strait.

== Content ==
The song is about a man having issues with his woman. He is out drinking because that woman he “had wrapped around [his] finger just come unwound".

== Cover versions ==
Country music singer Toby Keith covered the song from the television special George Strait: ACM Artist of the Decade All Star Concert. Garth Brooks, on The Melting Pot album of the compilation box set Blame It All on My Roots: Five Decades of Influences

== Critical reception ==
Kevin John Coyne of Country Universe gave the song an A grade, saying that it "would be a great record just for the fiddle alone, but a very youthful Strait is still able to deliver the goods, and the band is so country that you can almost smell the sawdust when they let loose." Stephen Thomas Erlewine with AllMusic referred to the song as a "jolt of honky-tonk and Western swing" that was Strait "tied together with ease," that Erlewine stated that was signature of Strait's style of country music for over four decades.

== Chart positions ==
Chart (1981)	Peak position
US Hot Country Songs (Billboard)	6
