= You're Something Special to Me =

Single by George Strait

from the album Something Special
- B-side: "Dance Time in Texas"
- Released: December 23, 1985
- Recorded: February 25, 1985
- Genre: Country
- Length: 3:20
- Label: MCA 52764
- Songwriter(s): David Anthony
- Producer(s): Jimmy Bowen & George Strait

George Strait singles chronology
"The Chair" (1985)	"You're Something Special to Me" (1985)	"Nobody in His Right Mind Would've Left Her" (1986)

"You're Something Special to Me" is a song written by David Anthony, and recorded by American country music artist George Strait. It was released in December 1985 as the second and final single from his album Something Special. The song peaked at #4 on the Billboard Hot Country Singles & Tracks and the Canadian RPM charts.

== Critical reception ==
Kevin John Coyne of Country Universe gave the song an A grade, calling it "so laid back that it’s easy to miss the craftsmanship." He goes on to say that Strait "channels a young Merle Haggard, a slow western swing arrangement surrounds him with warmth."

== Chart performance ==
This song peaked at #4 on both the Billboard Hot Country Songs chart and on the Canadian RPM Country Tracks chart.

Chart (1985–1986)	Peak position
US Hot Country Songs (Billboard)	4
Canadian RPM Country Tracks	4
