= Ocean Front Property (song) =

Single by George Strait

from the album Ocean Front Property
- B-side: "My Heart Won't Wander Very Far From You"
- Released: December 22, 1986
- Recorded: September 22, 1986
- Genre: Neotraditional country; honky-tonk
- Length: 3:08 (album version); 2:40 (single edit)
- Label: MCA 53021
- Songwriters: Dean Dillon, Hank Cochran, Royce Porter
- Producers: Jimmy Bowen, George Strait

George Strait singles chronology
"It Ain't Cool to Be Crazy About You" (1986)	"Ocean Front Property" (1986)	"All My Ex's Live in Texas" (1987)

"Ocean Front Property" is a song written by Dean Dillon, Hank Cochran and Royce Porter and recorded by American country music artist George Strait. It was released in December 1986 as the first single and title track from his album of the same name. It was a number-one hit in both the United States and Canada. On the 45 record single, "My Heart Won't Wander Very Far From You" is the B-side.

== Musical style and composition ==
"Ocean Front Property" is a neotraditional country and honky-tonk song with its musical arrangement compared to the styles of Bob Wills and Lefty Frizzell.

== Critical reception ==
Ben Foster of Country Universe gave the song an A grade, saying that it is "subtly clever, yet deceptively simple, with a strong undercurrent of heartache." He goes on to say that Strait’s vocal interpretation is "just straightforward enough to keep the song’s left-of-center metaphor from coming across as campy, keeping the undertone of sadness fully intact."

== Charts ==
Chart (1986–1987)	Peak position
US Hot Country Songs (Billboard)	1
Canadian RPM Country Tracks	1

== Certifications ==
Certifications for Ocean Front Property
Region	Certification	Certified units/sales
United States (RIAA)	Platinum	1,000,000^{‡}
^{‡} Sales+streaming figures based on certification alone.

== See also ==
- Arizona Bay
