= Fool Hearted Memory =

Single by George Strait

from the album Strait from the Heart
- B-side: "The Steal of the Night"
- Released: May 27, 1982
- Recorded: September 9, 1981
- Studio: Music City Music Hall (Nashville, Tennessee)
- Genre: Neotraditional Country; honky-tonk
- Length: 2:40 (album version); 2:12 (single edit)
- Label: MCA 12236
- Songwriters: Byron Hill; Blake Mevis
- Producer: Blake Mevis

George Strait singles chronology
"If You're Thinking You Want a Stranger (There's One Coming Home)" (1982)	"Fool Hearted Memory" (1982)	"Marina del Rey" (1982)

"Fool Hearted Memory" is a song written by Byron Hill and Blake Mevis, and recorded by American country music singer George Strait. The song was Strait's first number 1 single (Billboard Magazine, 1982). It was released in May 1982 as the first single from Strait's Strait from the Heart album, and was included in the soundtrack of the feature film The Soldier on Embassy Films. The song won an ASCAP Award for being among the most performed country songs of 1982.

== Critical reception ==
Kevin John Coyne of Country Universe gave the song an A grade, saying that Strait "finds his literal voice" on this song. He states that it is "stronger and more confident than it had been on his first album. While the song calls for a certain amount of restraint and sadness, Strait is able to fully capture those emotions without sounding at all timid." He goes on to say that you cannot listen to the song without "reveling in the delightfully country fiddle riff that dominates the track."

== Charts ==
=== Weekly charts ===
Chart (1982)	Peak position
US Hot Country Songs (Billboard)	1
Canadian RPM Country Tracks	1

=== Year-end charts ===
Chart (1982)	Position
US Hot Country Songs (Billboard)	15

== Certifications ==
Region	Certification	Certified units/sales
United States (RIAA)	Gold	500,000^{‡}
^{‡} Sales+streaming figures based on certification alone.
