= Down and Out (George Strait song) =

Single by George Strait

from the album Strait Country
- B-side: "Blame It on Mexico"
- Released: August 28, 1981
- Genre: Honky-tonk
- Length: 2:23
- Label: MCA (51104)
- Songwriter(s): Dean Dillon; Frank Dycus
- Producer(s): Blake Mevis

George Strait singles chronology
"Unwound" (1981)	"Down and Out" (1981)	"If You're Thinking You Want a Stranger (There's One Coming Home)" (1982)

"Down and Out" is a song written by Dean Dillon and Frank Dycus, and recorded by American country music artist George Strait. It was released in August 1981 as the second single from his album Strait Country. It peaked at number 16 on the United States Billboard Hot Country Singles chart and reached number 14 on the Canadian RPM Country Tracks chart.

== Critical reception ==
Kip Kirby of Billboard magazine reviewed the song favorably, saying that the "unmistakable Texas honkytonk flavor of this record puts it in the "Unwound" mold with heavy fiddle and string guitar and ripples of piano." Kevin John Coyne of Country Universe gave the song a B− grade, comparing the fiddle section to his previous single "Unwound" and says that it is "easy to imagine this filling the honky-tonk floors just as quickly." He states that even though Strait sings it well, the lyric is weak and generic.

== Chart positions ==
"Down and Out" debuted at number 78 on the U.S. Billboard Hot Country Singles for the week of September 12, 1981.

Chart (1981)	Peak position
US Hot Country Songs (Billboard)	16
Canadian RPM Country Tracks	14
