= Twang (song) =

Single by George Strait

from the album Twang
- Released: October 12, 2009
- Genre: Honky-tonk
- Length: 2:55
- Label: MCA Nashville
- Songwriters: Jim Lauderdale; Kendell Marvel; Jimmy Ritchey
- Producers: Tony Brown; George Strait

George Strait singles chronology
| "Living for the Night" (2009) | "Twang" (2009) | "I Gotta Get to You" (2010) |

"Twang" is a song written by Jim Lauderdale, Kendell Marvel and Jimmy Ritchey, and recorded by American country music singer George Strait. It was released in October 2009 as the second single and title track from his album Twang. It also appeared concurrently in the 2009 comedy film Did You Hear About the Morgans?, starring Hugh Grant and Sarah Jessica Parker, where it is played in a Costco-like store in Wyoming in the beginning of the movie.

== Content ==
"Twang" is an up-tempo in which the singer states a desire to listen to country music to "lift [his] spirits".

== Critical reception ==
Jim Malec described the song positively in his review of the album, calling it a "honky tonk floor-burner that brims with swaggar [sic]." Bobby Peacock also described it positively in his review of the album, saying that the lyric "I like all kinds of music, I try to keep an open mind" seemed like a "mission statement of sorts" for Strait. Country Weekly reviewer Chris Neal gave the song three-and-a-half stars out of five, calling it a "propulsive little groover" and saying that it was performed in "classic Strait style."

== Chart performance ==
"Twang" debuted at number 58 on the Billboard Hot Country Songs charts dated for August 22, 2009, from unsolicited airplay received after the album's release. It climbed to number 51 a week later and then fell from the charts, re-entering at number 45 on the chart dated for October 17, 2009. It peaked at number 14 on the country chart dated January 30, 2010, becoming Strait's first single to miss the Top Ten since "The Seashores of Old Mexico" peaked at number 11 in 2006. Also, on the week ending December 26, 2009, "Twang" debuted at number 100 on the Billboard Hot 100.

| Chart (2009–2010) | Peak position |
|---|---|
| Canada Country (Billboard) | 13 |
| US Hot Country Songs (Billboard) | 14 |
| US Billboard Hot 100 | 100 |
