= Marina del Rey (song) =

Single by George Strait

from the album Strait from the Heart
- B-side: "I Can't See Texas from Here"
- Released: September 16, 1982
- Recorded: January 11, 1982
- Studio: Music City Music Hall (Nashville, Tennessee)
- Genre: Country
- Length: 3:00
- Label: MCA 52120
- Songwriter(s): Dean Dillon; Frank Dycus
- Producer(s): Blake Mevis

George Strait singles chronology
"Fool Hearted Memory" (1982)	"Marina del Rey" (1982)	"Amarillo by Morning" (1983)

"Marina del Rey" is a song recorded by American country music artist George Strait. It was released in September 1982 as the second single from his album Strait from the Heart, which went on to be certified platinum by the RIAA. It peaked at number 6 in the United States, and number 2 in Canada. The song is set in Marina del Rey, California, and it is structured as a slow romantic ballad. Longtime country songwriters Frank Dycus and Dean Dillon composed the tune.

== Content ==
The song is about a love affair on the beach. A man and a woman get together and have a good time during a vacation. They create many memories and then go their separate ways – back to their normal lives.

== Cover versions ==
Country music singer Tim McGraw covered the song from the television special George Strait: ACM Artist of the Decade All Star Concert.

== Critical reception ==
Kevin John Coyne of Country Universe gave the song a B grade, saying that the lyrics are "appropriately longing and sentimental for times gone by, but Strait hasn’t yet developed enough as a vocalist to pull off the mature performance required."

== Chart positions ==
Chart (1982)	Peak position
US Hot Country Songs (Billboard)	6
Canadian RPM Country Tracks	2
