= Nobody in His Right Mind Would've Left Her =

Single by George Strait

from the album #7
- B-side: "You Still Get to Me"
- Released: April 1986
- Genre: Honky-tonk
- Length: 2:53
- Label: MCA 52817
- Songwriter: Dean Dillon
- Producers: Jimmy Bowen, George Strait

George Strait singles chronology
| "You're Something Special to Me" (1985) | "Nobody in His Right Mind Would've Left Her" (1986) | "It Ain't Cool to Be Crazy About You" (1986) |

"Nobody in His Right Mind Would've Left Her" is a song written by Dean Dillon, and recorded by American country music singer George Strait. It was released in April 1986 as the first single from the album #7. The song was originally recorded by Dillon, whose version peaked at number 25 on Billboard's Hot Country Singles & Tracks chart in 1980.

== Content ==
The male narrator of the song recounts how he broke up with a woman, but has now realized that he still loves her and regrets ending the relationship, and hopes to someday be able to forget her.

== Critical reception ==
Kevin John Coyne of Country Universe gave the song a B+ grade, calling it a "standard country weeper with a mouthful of a title." He goes on to say that Strait "is able to close the gap, which makes songs that would sound odd in another singer’s hands sound a bit surprising but still completely natural in Strait’s."

== Chart positions ==
=== Dean Dillon ===
| Chart (1980) | Peak position |
|---|---|
| US Hot Country Songs (Billboard) | 25 |

=== George Strait ===
| Chart (1986) | Peak position |
|---|---|
| US Hot Country Songs (Billboard) | 1 |
| Canadian RPM Country Tracks | 1 |

== Certifications ==
| Region | Certification | Certified units/sales |
|---|---|---|
| United States (RIAA) | Gold | 500,000^{‡} |
^{‡} Sales+streaming figures based on certification alone.

== Other versions ==
- Keith Whitley recorded the song for his 1985 album L.A. to Miami; however, it wasn't released as a single.
