= All My Ex's Live in Texas =

Single by George Strait

from the album Ocean Front Property
- B-side: "I'm All Behind You Now"
- Released: 1987
- Recorded: 1986
- Genre: Western; Western swing; honky-tonk
- Length: 3:22
- Label: MCA 53087
- Songwriters: Sanger D. Shafer; Lyndia J. Shafer
- Producers: Jimmy Bowen; George Strait

George Strait singles chronology
"Ocean Front Property" (1986)	"All My Ex's Live in Texas" (1987)	"Am I Blue" (1987)

Official audio
- "All My Ex's Live in Texas" on YouTube

"All My Ex's Live in Texas" is a song written by Sanger D. Shafer and Lyndia J. Shafer, and recorded by American country music singer George Strait. It was released in 1987, by MCA Records as the second single from Strait's seventh studio album, Ocean Front Property, following the album's title track. Becoming his 11th number one hit single, Strait received his first Grammy Award nomination for "All My Ex's Live In Texas" for Best Male Country Vocal Performance at the 1988 Grammy Awards.

The song has been used in various forms of media, including Strait's version in the films Road House (1989), Necessary Roughness (1991), Cold Creek Manor (2003), Power Rangers (2017), and Bumblebee (2018), and in television with Halt and Catch Fire in 2016, Ash vs Evil Dead in 2015, and Chuck in 2011. Rapper Luke recorded a parody entitled "All My Ex's" that was included on his 1994 album Freak for Life 6996. Canadian rapper Drake name checks Strait and the song in the opening lyrics of his 2012 single "HYFR (Hell Ya Fucking Right)".

Shafer's demo version has been used in the action-adventure game Grand Theft Auto: San Andreas (2004).

The format of the song is that of a list song.

== Musical style and composition ==
"All My Ex's Live in Texas" is a Western, Western swing, and honky-tonk song rooted in fiddle and pedal steel guitar.

== Content ==
The narrator explains that he had lived most of his life in Texas along the Frio River (Brazos River in Shafer's original recording, Colorado River in his later performances), but that a string of failed relationships with women in that state that ended disastrously (such as going insane, sending the law after him and walking out before the honeymoon) prompted him to flee to Tennessee; he still relives his more pleasant times in Texas by way of Transcendental Meditation (TM) each night. The song is known for its Western swing style rhythm.

== Cover versions ==
Country music singer Jack Ingram covered the song from the television special George Strait: ACM Artist of the Decade All Star Concert.

== Critical reception ==
"All My Ex's Live in Texas" is widely regarded as one of Strait's best songs. Billboard and American Songwriter ranked the song number two and number five, respectively, on their lists of the 10 greatest George Strait songs.

Kevin John Coyne of Country Universe gave the song a B+ grade, saying that "you can almost hear the guy smirking as he sings this swinging hit, running down a list of jilted lovers from all over the Lone Star state."

== Charts ==
Chart (1987)	Peak position
Canada Country Tracks (RPM)	1
US Hot Country Songs (Billboard)	1

== Certifications ==
Region	Certification	Certified units/sales
United States (RIAA)	2× Platinum	2,000,000^{‡}
^{‡} Sales+streaming figures based on certification alone.
