= David Wills (singer) =

American country music singer-songwriter (born 1951)

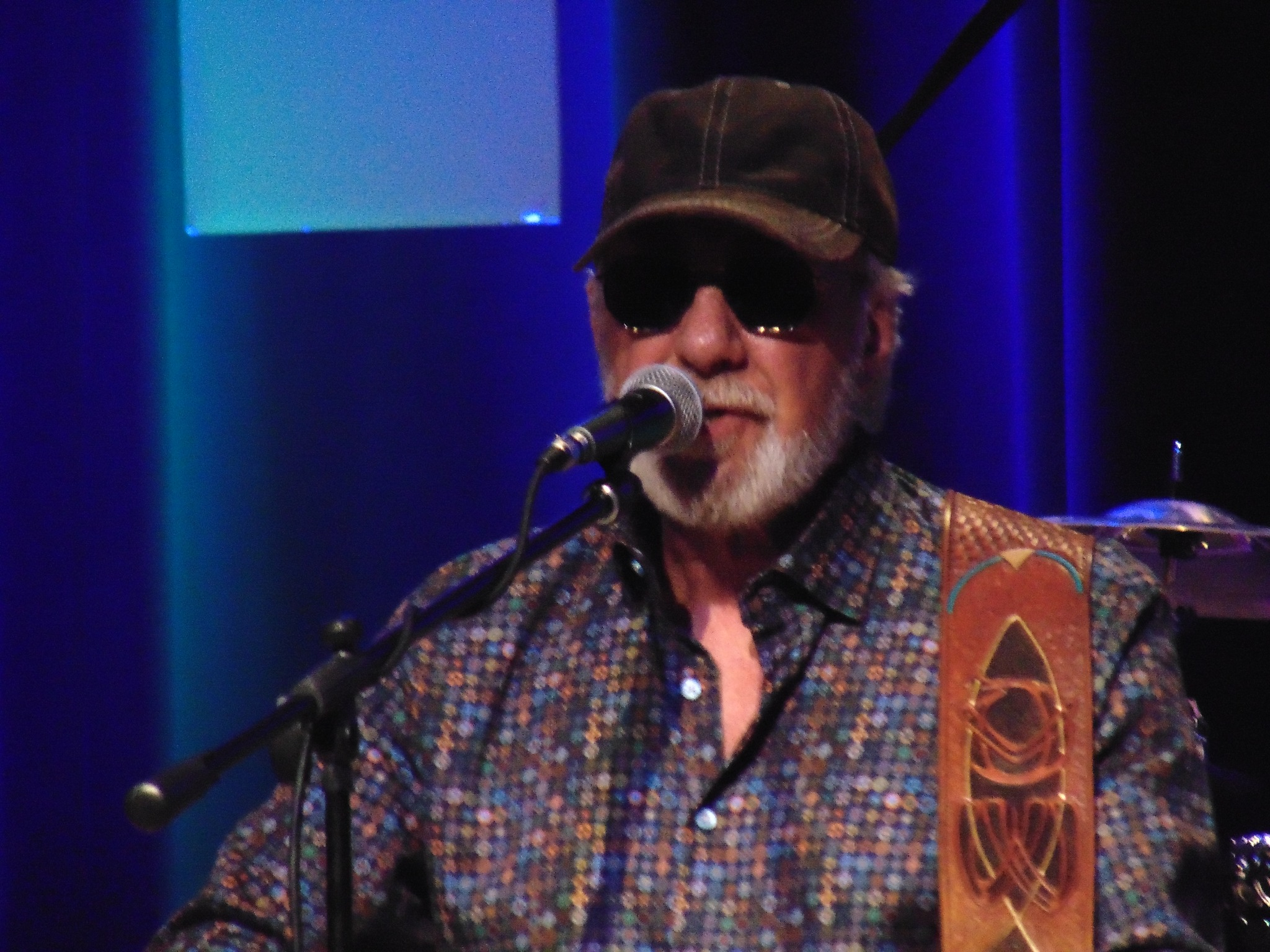
- David Wills performs at a concert at the Historic Ritz Theatre in Toccoa, Georgia on Friday, June 30, 2023.

Background information
- Born: David Steinfath; October 23, 1951 (age 74)
- Origin: Pulaski, Tennessee
- Genres: Country, Christian music
- Occupation: Singer-songwriter
- Instrument: Guitar
- Years active: 1975–present
- Labels: Epic, United Artists, RCA, Tugalo
- Website: www.davidwillsmusic.com

David Wills (born October 23, 1951, in Pulaski, Tennessee) is an American country music singer-songwriter. Wills released three studio albums and charted more than twenty singles on the Billboard Hot Country Singles chart between 1975 and 1988. Two of his songs, "There's a Song on the Jukebox" and "From Barrooms to Bedrooms," reached the Top 10 in 1975.

== Career ==
Wills was a BMI songwriter for Pride Music Group, along with Blake Mevis and Bob Moulds. David was married to Deborah Ann Smith (from Dallas, TX) who owned Alcorn Music, Inc. publishing company.

After releasing a gospel-themed album in 1996, titled Line On Love, Wills retired from the music industry. However, in 2021, Wills was contacted by a group of filmmakers from northeast Georgia who were working on a documentary about a local musician named Doug Moss. Moss had been a staple of the house band at a country music club in Athens, Georgia called the J&J Center, owned by entrepreneur Jerry Farmer. Wills performed there for many years with the house band Power Play and was a friend of Farmer. Wills agreed to an interview, and the group of filmmakers invited him to perform at a concert being held in Franklin Springs, Georgia that featured Glen Templeton as the headliner. Prior to the show, a tribute was held to Farmer for his impact on music in the northeast Georgia area. Wills performed his two signature songs there, as well as some of the songs he had written for others, including "You're The Last Thing I Needed Tonight" by John Schneider. Discussions were soon held by the filmmakers and Wills to produce two new albums, The Singer The Songwriter (released in November 2022) and Just For The Record (released in June 2023). Wills was soon signed to a record label owned by one of the filmmakers, Tugalo Records.

The sessions were held in July 2022 at Sonic Eden Studios in Nashville, Tennessee, and were guided by the owner and sound engineer John Albani, a former member of the band Rush. Singles from this two-album project include "Poor Boys", "When A Plan Comes Together", "Before You're Through Hurting Me", and "You Ought To See Her In Love".

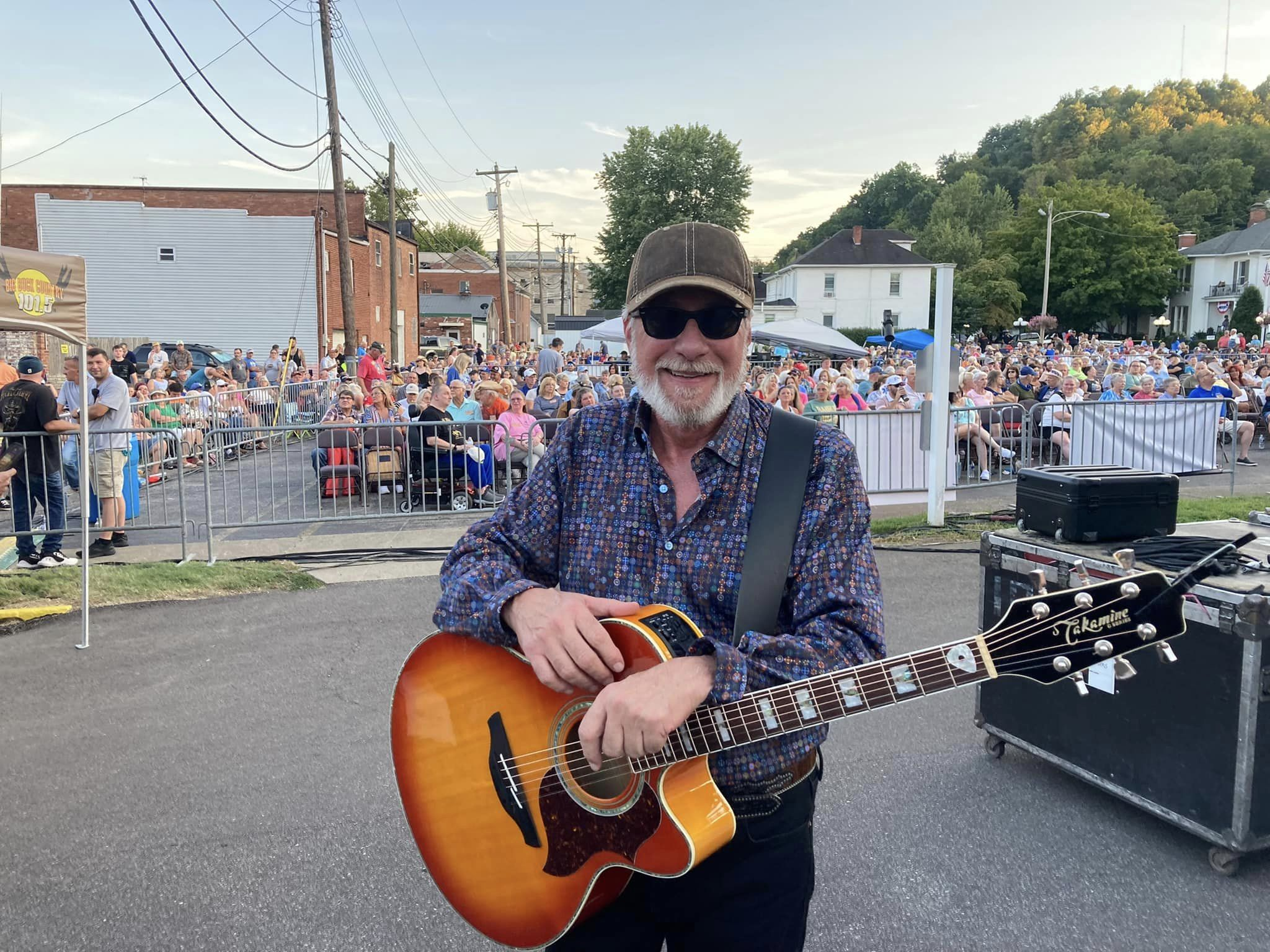
David Wills smiles before going on stage at the Catlettsburg Labor Day Celebration in downtown Catlettsburg, Kentucky on Monday, September 4, 2023. He opened for country band Lonestar.

As a songwriter, Wills wrote George Strait's "If You're Thinking You Want a Stranger (There's One Coming Home)" and Garth Brooks' "Wild Horses." "Wild Horses" appeared on three Brooks releases, No Fences, The Garth Brooks Collection, and The Limited Series. The total sales were around 26 million. According to independent research conducted, Wills' co-compositions have sold north of 38 million copies. Other artists who have recorded Wills' works include Anita Pointer, Charley Pride, Keith Whitley, John Michael Montgomery, Michael English, Jack Greene, Toby Keith, Sawyer Brown, Martina McBride, Lacy J. Dalton, Patty Loveless, Doug Bruce, Neal McCoy and Johnny Paycheck. The song that English recorded, "Holding Out Hope To You", won a 1994 Dove Award. Wills' primary songwriting partner and best friend is Bill Shore, who himself has had works recorded by Pride and Strait.

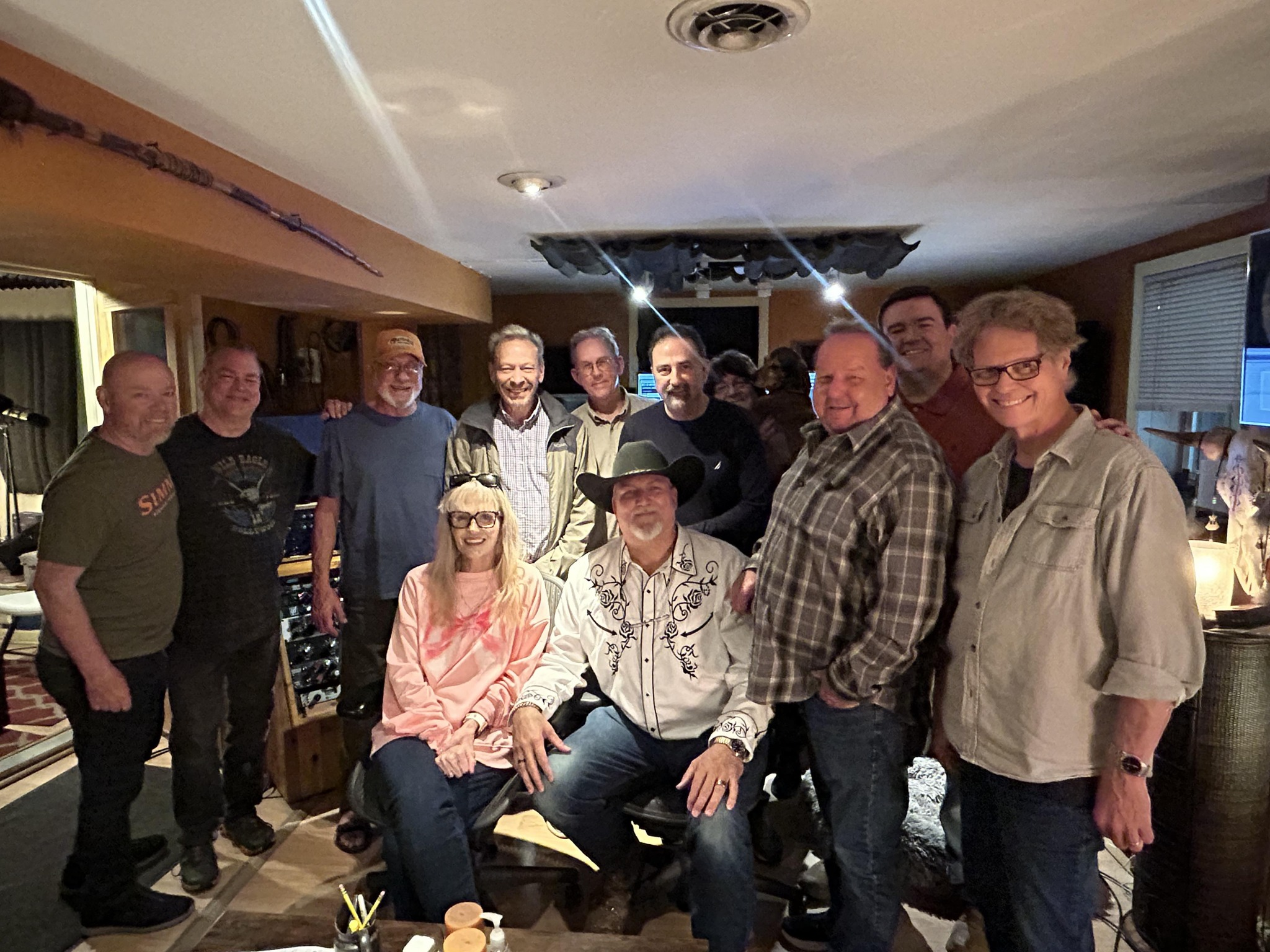
David Wills (orange hat) at Sonic Eden studios in April 2025.

In October of 2024, Wills was inducted into the Josie Music Awards' Independent Country Music Hall of Fame. The announcement was made at the Freedom Celebration 24 concert on July 6, 2024. Wills had been one of the opening acts, and the headliner, country music hitmaker T. Graham Brown, made the announcement before performing his set.

== Discography ==
=== Albums ===
Year	Album	US Country	Label
1975	Barrooms to Bedrooms	13	Epic
1975	Everybody's Country	31	Epic
1984	New Beginnings	62	RCA
1990	Line On Love	-	Gateway
2022	The Singer the Songwriter	-	Tugalo
2023	Just for the Record	-	Tugalo
2025	Way Too Much Fun	-	Tugalo

=== Singles ===
Year	Single	Chart Positions		Album
Year	Single	US Country	CAN Country	Album
1975	"There's a Song on the Jukebox"	10	5	Barrooms to Bedrooms
1975	"From Barrooms to Bedrooms"	10	7	Barrooms to Bedrooms
1975	"The Barmaid"	31	—	Barrooms to Bedrooms
1975	"She Deserves My Very Best"	35	48	Everybody's Country
1976	"Queen of the Starlight Room"	47	—	Everybody's Country
1976	"Woman"	55	32	singles only
1976	"(I'm Just Pouring Out) What She Bottled Up in Me"	66	—	singles only
1977	"The Best Part of My Days (Are My Nights with You)"	52	—	singles only
1977	"Cheatin' Turns Her On"	91	—	singles only
1977	"Do You Wanna Make Love"	82	—	singles only
1978	"You Snap Your Fingers (And I'm Back in Your Hands)"	70	—	singles only
1979	"I'm Being Good"	50	—	singles only
1979	"Endless"	82	—	singles only
1980	"She's Hangin' in There (I'm Hangin' Out)"	91	—	singles only
1980	"The Light of My Life (Has Gone Out Again Tonight)"	65	—	singles only
1983	"Those Nights, These Days"	52	—	New Beginnings
1983	"The Eyes of a Stranger"	19	—	New Beginnings
1984	"Miss Understanding"	26	44	New Beginnings
1984	"Lady in Waiting"	31	—	New Beginnings
1984	"Macon Love"	69	—	singles only
1988	"Paper Thin Walls"	85	—	singles only
2022	"Poor Boys"	-	—	The Singer the Songwriter
2023	"Before You're Through Hurting Me"	-	—	The Singer the Songwriter
2024	"When A Plan Comes Together"	-	-	Just For The Record
2024	"You Ought To See Her In Love"	-	-	Just For The Record
2025	"Honor Bound"	-	-	Way Too Much Fun!
2025	"No Anchors"	-	-	Way Too Much Fun!
2025	"John Deere Blue"	-	-	Way Too Much Fun!
