= Dean Dillon =

American singer-songwriter (born 1955)

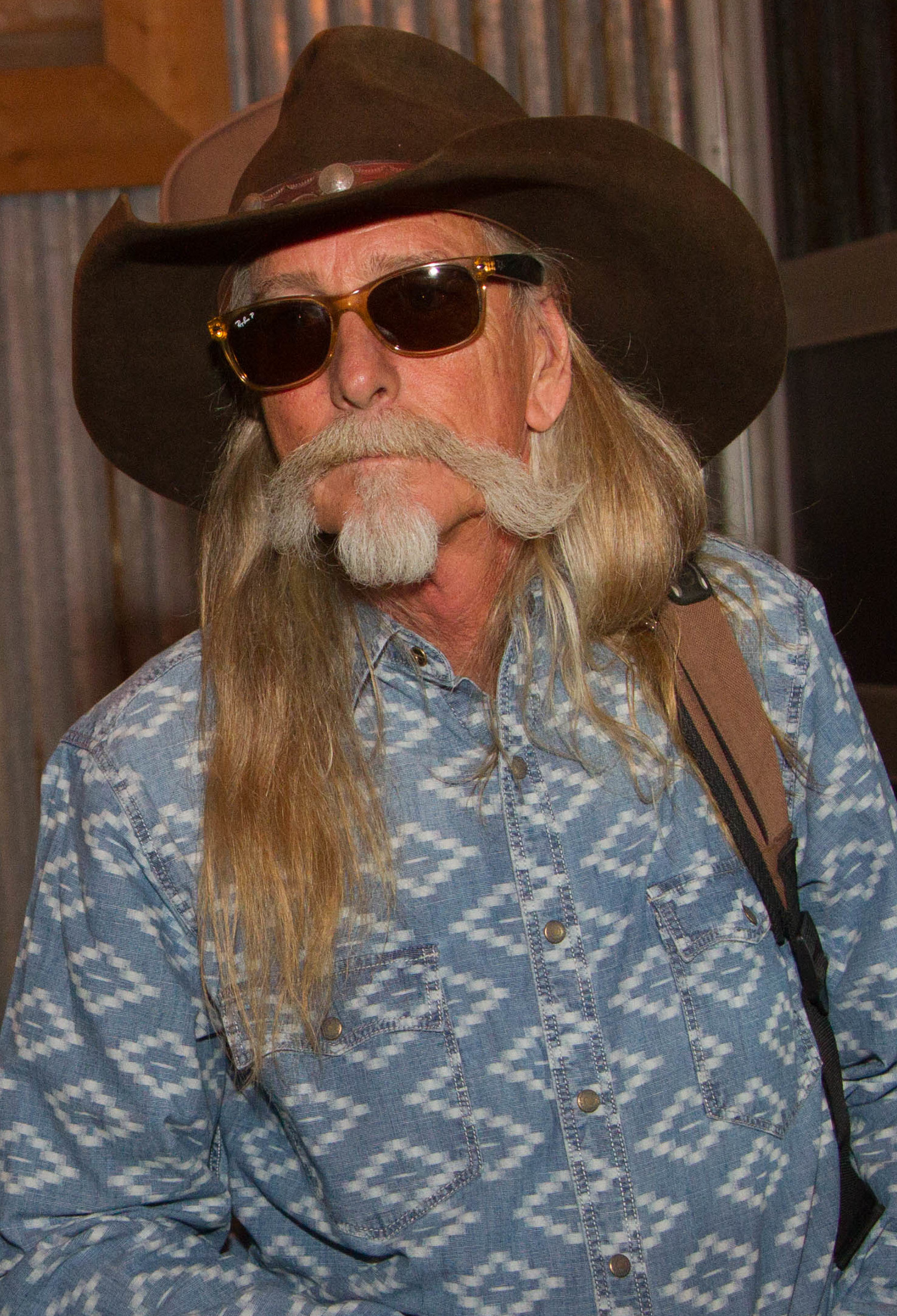
- Dillon in 2017

Background information
- Also known as: Dean Rutherford; Dean Dalton
- Born: Larry Dean Flynn; March 26, 1955 (age 71); Lake City, Tennessee, U.S.
- Genre: Country
- Occupations: Singer, songwriter
- Instruments: Vocals, guitar
- Years active: 1979–present
- Labels: RCA, Capitol, Atlantic

Dean Dillon (born Larry Dean Flynn; March 26, 1955) is an American country musician and songwriter. Between 1982 and 1993, he recorded six studio albums on various labels, and charted several singles on the Billboard country charts. Since 1993, Dillon has continued to write hit songs for other artists, most notably George Strait.

In 2002, Dillon was inducted into the Nashville Songwriters Hall of Fame. In 2020, he was inducted into the Country Music Hall of Fame.

== Early life ==
Dean Dillon was born Larry Dean Flynn on March 26, 1955, in Lake City, Tennessee, where he was raised. He began playing the guitar at the age of seven, and when he was 15 he made his first public appearance as a singer and performer in the Knoxville variety show Jim Clayton Startime. After completing Oak Ridge High School in 1973 he hitchhiked to Nashville with hopes of starting a music career. Dillon first recorded on the Plantation label as Dean Rutherford, and then as Dean Dalton. Upon moving to RCA Records, he was persuaded to change his recording name; record executive Jerry Bradley randomly picked the name Dillon from a telephone book.

== Career ==
=== Recording artist ===
As a recording artist between 1979 and 1983, Dillon charted eight times, including one top 30 hit, "I'm into the Bottle (To Get You out of My Mind)". He was featured on several duet albums with songwriting partner Gary Stewart. Early songwriting success earned Dillon a recording deal with Capitol Records for whom he released two studio albums. In 1991, now at Atlantic Records, Dillon released his most successful and most recent studio album, Out of Your Ever Lovin' Mind.

=== Songwriter ===
As a songwriter, early successes includes David Allan Coe's 1981 hit "Tennessee Whiskey". Dillon has written many singles for George Strait, including "Unwound", "Down and Out", "Marina del Rey", "The Chair", "Nobody in His Right Mind Would've Left Her", "It Ain't Cool to Be Crazy About You", "Ocean Front Property", "Famous Last Words of a Fool", "I've Come to Expect It from You", "If I Know Me", "Easy Come, Easy Go", "Lead On", "The Best Day", "She Let Herself Go", "Living for the Night", "Here for a Good Time", "Drinkin' Man", "I Believe" and "Every Little Honky Tonk Bar". Strait and his son Bubba co-wrote the latter five with Dillon.

=== Record label ===
In 2018 he met Sundance Head at a Houston Rodeo and fell in love with his voice. "The first time I heard 'Dance' I thought, 'where has THIS guy been hiding? I've been in this business all my life, and with the exception of a couple of people, I've never heard anybody sing the way this man does. He is extremely special," says Dillon. With the help of business associates from Texas, Dillon created his own record label WildCatter Records, signing Sundance Head. On January 25, 2019, their first album together, Stained Glass and Neon, was released.

== Personal life ==
Dillon's daughter, Jessie Jo Dillon, is also a songwriter. He also has another daughter, named Song, who is also a singer songwriter. Dillon is currently married to Susie

== Discography ==
=== Albums ===
Year	Album	US Country	Label
1982	Brotherly Love (with Gary Stewart)	23	RCA
1983	Those Were the Days (with Gary Stewart)	54	RCA
1988	Slick Nickel	—	Capitol
1989	I've Learned to Live	—	Capitol
1991	Out of Your Ever Lovin' Mind	58	Atlantic
1993	Hot, Country and Single	—	Atlantic

=== Singles ===
Year	Single	Peak positions		Album
Year	Single	US Country	CAN Country	Album
1979	"I'm Into the Bottle (To Get You Out of My Mind)"	30	—	—N/a
1980	"What Good Is a Heart"	28	—	—N/a
1980	"Nobody in His Right Mind (Would’ve Left Her)"	25	—	—N/a
1981	"They'll Never Take Me Alive"	57	—	—N/a
1981	"Jesus Let Me Slide"	77	—	—N/a
1982	"Brotherly Love" (with Gary Stewart)	41	—	Brotherly Love
1982	"Play This Old Working Day Away"	74	—	Brotherly Love
1982	"You to Come Home To"	65	—	Brotherly Love
1983	"Those Were the Days" (with Gary Stewart)	47	—	Those Were the Days
1983	"Smokin' in the Rockies" (with Gary Stewart)	71	—	Those Were the Days
1983	"Famous Last Words of a Fool"	67	—	—N/a
1988	"The New Never Wore Off My Sweet Baby"	51	—	Slick Nickel
1988	"I Go to Pieces"	39	—	Slick Nickel
1988	"Hey Heart"	58	—	Slick Nickel
1989	"It's Love That Makes You Sexy"	61	60	I've Learned to Live
1989	"Back in the Swing of Things"	89	70	I've Learned to Live
1991	"Holed Up in Some Honky Tonk"	69	50	Out of Your Ever Lovin' Mind
1991	"Friday Night's Woman"	39	26	Out of Your Ever Lovin' Mind
1991	"Don't You Even (Think About Leavin')"	62	71	Out of Your Ever Lovin' Mind
1993	"Hot, Country and Single"	62	—	Hot, Country and Single
"—" denotes releases that did not chart

=== Music videos ===
Year	Video	Director
1988	"The New Never Wore Off My Sweet Baby"	John Lloyd Miller
1991	"Holed Up in Some Honky Tonk"	
1991	"Don't You Even (Think About Leaving)"	
1993	"Hot, Country & Single"	Mary Newman-Said

== Songs written ==
Dillon has worked with a younger generation of country stars including Toby Keith and Kenny Chesney. In 2002, he was inducted into the Nashville Songwriters Hall of Fame along with Bob Dylan and Shel Silverstein. Dillon co-wrote two songs on Toby Keith's 2005 album Honkytonk University, and five on his 2006 album White Trash with Money, including the single "A Little Too Late".

Dillon has either written or co-written the following singles for other artists:

Artist	Song	Co-writers
Alabama	"Changes Comin' On"	
Brooks & Dunn	"I'll Never Forgive My Heart"	Ronnie Dunn, Janine Dunn
David Allan Coe	"Tennessee Whiskey"	Linda Hargrove
David Kersh	"She Wants Me to Stay (Stay Gone)"	Ronnie Dunn
Dennis Robbins	"The Only Slide I Ever Played On"	Dennis Robbins
Gary Stewart	"An Empty Glass"	Gary Stewart
George Jones	"Tennessee Whiskey"	Linda Hargrove
George Strait	"A Real Good Place to Start"	Gary Nicholson
George Strait	"Any Old Love Won't Do"	Frank Dycus
George Strait	"Back to Bein' Me"	Hank Cochran
George Strait	"Down and Out"	Frank Dycus
George Strait	"Drinkin' Man"	George Strait, Bubba Strait
George Strait	"Easy Come, Easy Go"	Aaron Barker
George Strait	"Famous Last Words of a Fool"	Rex Huston
George Strait	"For Christ's Sake, It's Christmas"	Hank Cochran
George Strait	"Four Down and Twelve Across"	Tom Douglas
George Strait	"Friday Night Fever"	Frank Dycus, Blake Mevis
George Strait	"Give Me More Time"	Al Anderson, Scotty Emerick
George Strait	"Good News, Bad News"	Dale Dodson, Lee Ann Womack
George Strait	"Her Goodbye Hit Me in the Heart"	Frank Dycus
George Strait	"He's Got That Something Special"	George Strait, Bubba Strait
George Strait	"Holding My Own"	Pam Belford
George Strait	"Honk If You Honky Tonk"	Ken Mellons, John Northrup
George Strait	"Honky Tonk Crazy"	Frank Dycus
George Strait	"Honkytonkville"	Buddy Brock, Kim Williams
George Strait	"I Ain't Her Cowboy Anymore"	Scotty Emerick, Maria Cannon-Goodman
George Strait	"I Believe"	George Strait, Bubba Strait
George Strait	"I Get Along With You"	Frank Dycus, Murray F. Cannon, Raleigh Squires, and Jimmy Darrell
George Strait	"I'd Just as Soon Go"	Aaron Barker
George Strait	"If I Know Me"	Pam Belford
George Strait	"If Heartaches Were Horses"	Buddy Brock, Wil Nance
George Strait	"If It's Gonna Rain"	Scotty Emerick, Donny Kees
George Strait	"I'm All Behind You Now"	
George Strait	"Is It That Time Again"	Buddy Cannon, Vern Gosdin
George Strait	"It Ain't Cool to Be Crazy About You"	Royce Porter
George Strait	"I've Come to Expect It From You"	Buddy Cannon
George Strait	"Lead On"	Teddy Gentry
George Strait	"Living for the Night"	George Strait, Bubba Strait
George Strait	"Marina del Rey"	Frank Dycus
George Strait	"Nobody in His Right Mind Would've Left Her	
George Strait	"Ocean Front Property"	Hank Cochran, Royce Porter
George Strait	"Peace of Mind"	Aaron Barker
George Strait	"Rockin' in the Arms of Your Memory"	Norro Wilson
George Strait	"She Let Herself Go"	Kerry Kurt Phillips
George Strait	"She's Playing Hell Trying to Get Me to Heaven"	David Wills, Charles Quillen
George Strait	"She Took the Wind From His Sails"	Donny Kees
George Strait	"That's My Kind of Woman"	Tammy Hyler
George Strait	"That's the Breaks"	Royce Porter
George Strait	"That's Where I Wanna Take Our Love"	Hank Cochran
George Strait	"The Best Day"	Carson Chamberlain
George Strait	"The Breath You Take"	Jessie Jo Dillon, Casey Beathard
George Strait	"The Chair"	Hank Cochran
George Strait	"The Road Less Traveled"	Buddy Brock
George Strait	"Unwound"	Frank Dycus
George Strait	"We're Supposed to Do That Now and Then"	David Anthony, Joseph-Nicholas-Pancrac Royer
George Strait	"West Texas Town"	Robert Earl Keen
George Strait	"What Would Your Memories Do"	Hank Cochran
George Strait	"When You're in Love"	Kerry Kurt Phillips
George Strait	"Without Me Around"	John Northrup
George Strait	"Without You Here"	Royce Porter
George Strait	"You Sure Got This Ol' Redneck Feelin' Blue"	Buzz Rabin
Granger Smith	"C'est La Vie"	Aaron Barker, Gary Chapman
Hank Williams, Jr., Waylon Jennings, and Ernest Tubb	"Leave Them Boys Alone"	Gary Stewart
Jim Ed Brown and Helen Cornelius	"Lying In Love with You"	Gary Harrison
Keith Whitley	"Miami, My Amy"	Hank Cochran, Royce Porter
Keith Whitley	"Homecoming '63"	Royce Porter
Kenny Chesney	"A Chance"	Royce Porter
Kenny Chesney	"A Lot of Things Different"	Bill Anderson
Kenny Chesney	"Be As You Are"	Kenny Chesney
Kenny Chesney	"Boats"	Kenny Chesney, Scotty Emerick
Kenny Chesney	"Guitars and Tiki Bars"	Kenny Chesney, Mark Tamburino
Kenny Chesney	"I'm Alive"	Kenny Chesney, Mark Tamburino
Kenny Chesney	"She Always Says It First"	Kenny Chesney
Kenny Chesney	"Soul of a Sailor"	Kenny Chesney, Scotty Emerick
Kenny Chesney	"The Angel at the Top of My Tree"	Kenny Chesney, Buddy Cannon
Lee Ann Womack	"Have You Seen That Girl?"	
Lee Ann Womack	"Twenty Years and Two Husbands Ago"	
Lee Ann Womack featuring George Strait	"We've Called It Everything But Quits"	
Lorrie Morgan	"Is It Raining at Your House"	Hank Cochran, Vern Gosdin
Pam Tillis	"All the Good Ones Are Gone"	
Pam Tillis	"Spilled Perfume"	
Paul Overstreet	"If I Could Bottle This Up"	
Rodney Atkins	"The Corner"	Dale Dodson, Jessie Jo Dillon
Sammy Kershaw	"One Day Left to Live"	
Shenandoah	"Darned If I Don't (Danged If I Do)"	Ronnie Dunn
Toby Keith	"A Little Too Late"	Toby Keith, Scotty Emerick
Toby Keith	"Ain't No Right Way"	Toby Keith, Scotty Emerick
Toby Keith	"Burnin' Moonlight"	Toby Keith, Scotty Emerick
Toby Keith	"Get My Drink On"	Toby Keith, Scotty Emerick
Toby Keith	"Go with Her"	Toby Keith, Scotty Emerick
Toby Keith	"I Ain't Already There"	Toby Keith, Scotty Emerick
Toby Keith	"Knock Yourself Out"	Toby Keith, Scotty Emerick
Toby Keith	"Note to Self"	Toby Keith, Scotty Emerick
Toby Keith	"Too Far This Time"	Toby Keith, Scotty Emerick
Toby Keith	"You Ain't Leaving (Thank God Are Ya)"	Toby Keith, Scotty Emerick
Vern Gosdin	"Is It Raining at Your House"	
Vern Gosdin	"Set 'Em Up, Joe"	
Vince Gill	"Whippoorwill River"	Vince Gill
Wendel Adkins	"Slide Guitar"	Dennis Robbins

== Awards and nominations ==
=== As a recording artist ===
Year	Organization	Award	Nominee/Work	Result
1981	Academy of Country Music Awards	Top New Male Vocalist	Dean Dillon	Shortlisted
1983	Academy of Country Music Awards	Top Vocal Duo of the Year	Dean Dillon and Gary Stewart	Nominated

=== As a songwriter ===
Year	Organization	Award	Nominee/Work	Result
1987	Academy of Country Music Awards	Song of the Year	"Nobody in His Right Mind Would've Left Her"	Shortlisted
1988	Academy of Country Music Awards	Song of the Year	"Ocean Front Property"	Nominated
1989	Academy of Country Music Awards	Song of the Year	"Set 'Em Up Joe"	Nominated
1997	Country Music Association Awards	Song of the Year	"All the Good Ones Are Gone"	Nominated
1998	Academy of Country Music Awards	Song of the Year	"All the Good Ones Are Gone"	Nominated
2003	Academy of Country Music Awards	Song of the Year	"A Lot of Things Different"	Nominated
2013	Academy of Country Music Awards	Poet's Award	Dean Dillon	Awarded
2017	Academy of Country Music Awards	Song of the Year	"Tennessee Whiskey"	Nominated
