= George Strait singles discography =

George Strait discography
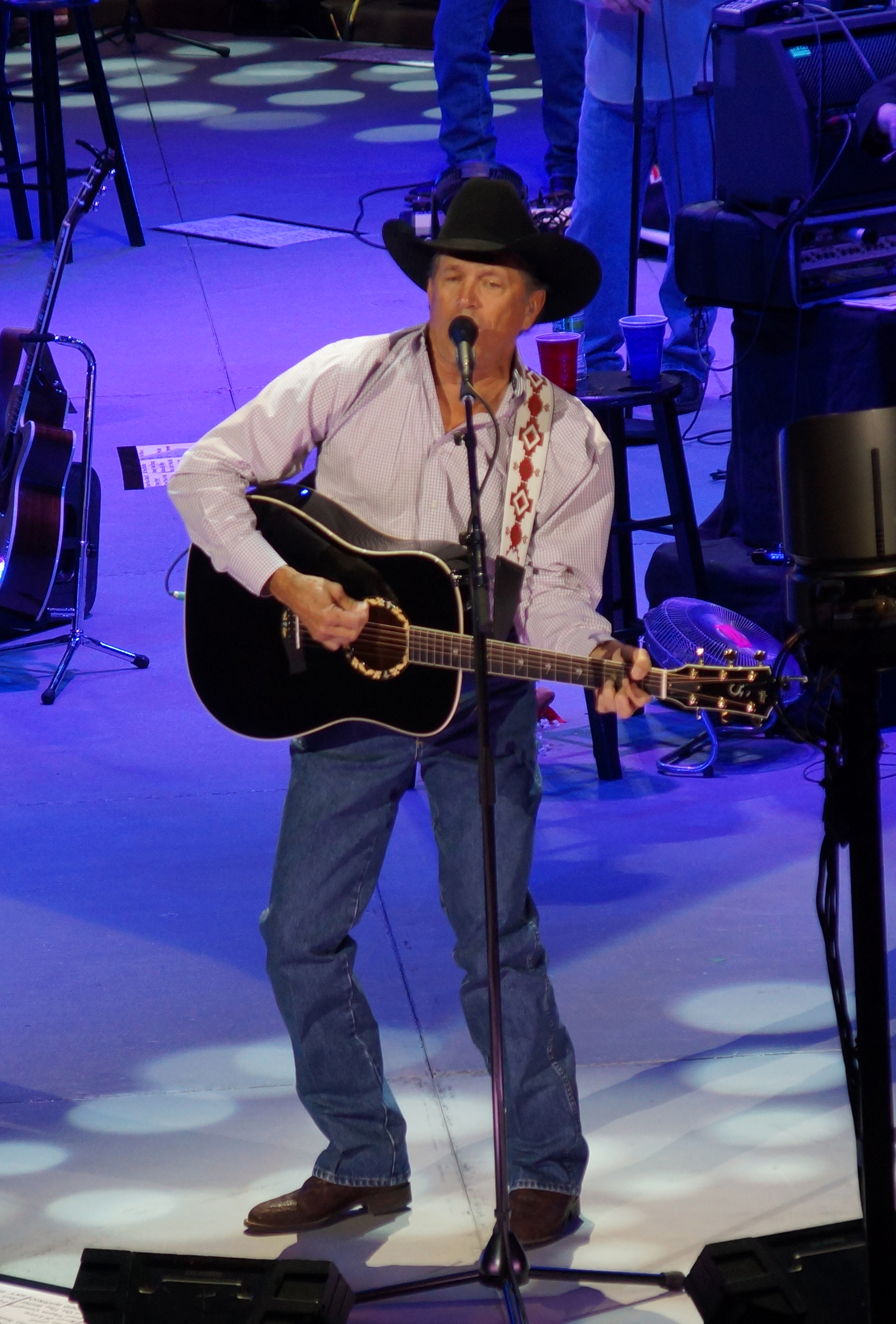
- Singles: 104
- Music videos: 16
- Other charted songs: 24
- No. 1 singles (US): 60

The singles discography of American country music singer George Strait comprises 125 charted singles, starting with "Unwound" in 1981. He has 44 No. 1s on the Billboard country chart, the most of any artist. Strait has also amassed 86 Top 10 hits on Billboard's Hot Country Songs, second only to Eddy Arnold, who had 92.

== Singles ==
=== 1980s ===
| Year | Single | Peak chart positions | | Certifications (sales threshold) | Album |
| Year | Single | US Country | CAN Country | Certifications (sales threshold) | Album |
|---|---|---|---|---|---|
| 1981 | "Unwound" | 6 | — | | Strait Country |
| 1981 | "Down and Out" | 16 | 14 | | Strait Country |
| 1982 | "If You're Thinking You Want a Stranger (There's One Coming Home)" | 3 | 2 | | Strait Country |
| 1982 | "Fool Hearted Memory" | 1 | 1 | RIAA: Gold | Strait from the Heart |
| 1982 | "Marina del Rey" | 6 | 2 | | Strait from the Heart |
| 1983 | "Amarillo by Morning" | 4 | 1 | RIAA: 4× Platinum | Strait from the Heart |
| 1983 | "A Fire I Can't Put Out" | 1 | 2 | | Strait from the Heart |
| 1983 | "You Look So Good in Love" | 1 | 1 | RIAA: Platinum | Right or Wrong |
| 1984 | "Right or Wrong" | 1 | 1 | | Right or Wrong |
| 1984 | "Let's Fall to Pieces Together" | 1 | 1 | | Right or Wrong |
| 1984 | "Does Fort Worth Ever Cross Your Mind" | 1 | 10 | | Does Fort Worth Ever Cross Your Mind |
| 1985 | "The Cowboy Rides Away" | 5 | 3 | RIAA: Platinum | Does Fort Worth Ever Cross Your Mind |
| 1985 | "The Fireman" | 5 | 10 | RIAA: Platinum | Does Fort Worth Ever Cross Your Mind |
| 1985 | "The Chair" | 1 | 1 | RIAA: Platinum | Something Special |
| 1985 | "You're Something Special to Me" | 4 | 4 | | Something Special |
| 1986 | "Nobody in His Right Mind Would've Left Her" | 1 | 1 | RIAA: Gold | #7 |
| 1986 | "It Ain't Cool to Be Crazy About You" | 1 | 5 | | #7 |
| 1986 | "Ocean Front Property" | 1 | 1 | RIAA: Platinum | Ocean Front Property |
| 1987 | "All My Ex's Live in Texas" | 1 | 1 | RIAA: 2× Platinum | Ocean Front Property |
| 1987 | "Am I Blue" | 1 | 1 | | Ocean Front Property |
| 1988 | "Famous Last Words of a Fool" | 1 | 1 | | If You Ain't Lovin' You Ain't Livin' |
| 1988 | "Baby Blue" | 1 | 3 | RIAA: Gold | If You Ain't Lovin' You Ain't Livin' |
| 1988 | "If You Ain't Lovin' (You Ain't Livin')" | 1 | 1 | | If You Ain't Lovin' You Ain't Livin' |
| 1988 | "Baby's Gotten Good at Goodbye" | 1 | 1 | RIAA: Gold | Beyond the Blue Neon |
| 1989 | "What's Going On in Your World" | 1 | 2 | | Beyond the Blue Neon |
| 1989 | "Ace in the Hole" | 1 | 1 | | Beyond the Blue Neon |
| 1989 | "Overnight Success" | 8 | 7 | | Beyond the Blue Neon |
"—" denotes releases that did not chart

=== 1990s ===
| Year | Single | Peak chart positions | | | Certifications (sales threshold) | Album |
| Year | Single | US Country | US | CAN Country | Certifications (sales threshold) | Album |
|---|---|---|---|---|---|---|
| 1990 | "Love Without End, Amen" | 1 | — | 1 | RIAA: Platinum | Livin' It Up |
| 1990 | "Drinking Champagne" | 4 | — | 3 | | Livin' It Up |
| 1990 | "I've Come to Expect It from You" | 1 | — | 1 | | Livin' It Up |
| 1991 | "If I Know Me" | 1 | — | 1 | | Chill of an Early Fall |
| 1991 | "You Know Me Better Than That" | 1 | — | 1 | | Chill of an Early Fall |
| 1991 | "The Chill of an Early Fall" | 3 | — | 2 | | Chill of an Early Fall |
| 1992 | "Lovesick Blues" | 24 | — | 23 | | Chill of an Early Fall |
| 1992 | "Gone as a Girl Can Get" | 5 | — | 6 | | Holding My Own |
| 1992 | "So Much Like My Dad" | 3 | — | 3 | | Holding My Own |
| 1992 | "I Cross My Heart" | 1 | — | 1 | RIAA: 3× Platinum | Pure Country |
| 1993 | "Heartland" | 1 | — | 1 | RIAA: Gold | Pure Country |
| 1993 | "When Did You Stop Loving Me" | 6 | — | 6 | | Pure Country |
| 1993 | "Easy Come, Easy Go" | 1 | 71 | 1 | RIAA: Gold | Easy Come, Easy Go |
| 1993 | "I'd Like to Have That One Back" | 3 | — (Note: "I'd Like to Have That One Back" did not enter the Hot 100, but peaked at number nine on the Bubbling Under Hot 100 Singles chart, which acts as a 25-song extension of the Hot 100.) | 3 | | Easy Come, Easy Go |
| 1994 | "Lovebug" | 8 | — (Note: "Love Bug" did not enter the Hot 100, but peaked at number 14 on the Bubbling Under Hot 100 Singles chart, which acts as a 25-song extension of the Hot 100.) | 9 | | Easy Come, Easy Go |
| 1994 | "The Man in Love with You" | 4 | — (Note: "The Man in Love with You" did not enter the Hot 100, but peaked at number 12 on the Bubbling Under Hot 100 Singles chart, which acts as a 25-song extension of the Hot 100.) | 2 | | Easy Come, Easy Go |
| 1994 | "The Big One" | 1 | — | 4 | | Lead On |
| 1994 | "You Can't Make a Heart Love Somebody" | 1 | — (Note: "You Can't Make a Heart Love Somebody" did not enter the Hot 100, but peaked at number 11 on the Bubbling Under Hot 100 Singles chart, which acts as a 25-song extension of the Hot 100.) | 2 | | Lead On |
| 1995 | "Adalida" | 3 | — | 2 | | Lead On |
| 1995 | "Lead On" | 7 | — | 8 | | Lead On |
| 1995 | "Check Yes or No" | 1 | — | 1 | RIAA: 5× Platinum | Strait Out of the Box |
| 1995 | "I Know She Still Loves Me" | 5 | — | 8 | | Strait Out of the Box |
| 1996 | "Blue Clear Sky" | 1 | — | 1 | RIAA: Platinum | Blue Clear Sky |
| 1996 | "Carried Away" | 1 | — | 2 | RIAA: Platinum | Blue Clear Sky |
| 1996 | "I Can Still Make Cheyenne" | 4 | — | 2 | RIAA: Platinum | Blue Clear Sky |
| 1996 | "King of the Mountain" | 19 | — | 27 | | Blue Clear Sky |
| 1997 | "One Night at a Time" | 1 | 59 | 1 | RIAA: Gold | Carrying Your Love with Me |
| 1997 | "Carrying Your Love with Me" | 1 | — | 1 | RIAA: 2× Platinum | Carrying Your Love with Me |
| 1997 | "Today My World Slipped Away" | 3 | — | 7 | | Carrying Your Love with Me |
| 1998 | "Round About Way" | 1 | — | 1 | | Carrying Your Love with Me |
| 1998 | "I Just Want to Dance with You" | 1 | 61 | 1 | RIAA: Platinum | One Step at a Time |
| 1998 | "True" | 2 | — | 1 | | One Step at a Time |
| 1998 | "We Really Shouldn't Be Doing This" | 4 | 44 | 2 | | One Step at a Time |
| 1999 | "Meanwhile" | 4 | 38 | 1 | | Always Never the Same |
| 1999 | "Write This Down" | 1 | 27 | 1 | RIAA: 2× Platinum | Always Never the Same |
| 1999 | "What Do You Say to That" | 4 | 45 | 2 | | Always Never the Same |
"—" denotes releases that did not chart

=== 2000s ===
| Year | Single | Peak chart positions | | | | Certifications (sales threshold) | Album |
| Year | Single | US Country | US | CAN Country | CAN | Certifications (sales threshold) | Album |
|---|---|---|---|---|---|---|---|
| 2000 | "The Best Day" | 1 | 31 | 7 | — | | Latest Greatest Straitest Hits |
| 2000 | "Go On" | 2 | 40 | 1 | — | | George Strait |
| 2000 | "Don't Make Me Come Over There and Love You" | 17 | — (Note: "Don't Make Me Come Over There and Love You" did not enter the Hot 100, but peaked at number two on the Bubbling Under Hot 100 Singles chart, which acts as a 25-song extension of the Hot 100.) | — | — | | George Strait |
| 2001 | "If You Can Do Anything Else" | 5 | 51 | — | — | | George Strait |
| 2001 | "Run" | 2 | 34 | — | — | RIAA: Platinum | The Road Less Traveled |
| 2002 | "Living and Living Well" | 1 | 27 | — | — | | The Road Less Traveled |
| 2002 | "She'll Leave You with a Smile" | 1 | 23 | — | — | RIAA: Platinum | The Road Less Traveled |
| 2003 | "Tell Me Something Bad About Tulsa" | 11 | 69 | — | — | | Honkytonkville |
| 2003 | "Cowboys Like Us" | 2 | 38 | — | — | RIAA: Gold | Honkytonkville |
| 2004 | "Desperately" | 6 | 44 | 5 | — | | Honkytonkville |
| 2004 | "I Hate Everything" | 1 | 35 | 3 | — | RIAA: Gold | 50 Number Ones |
| 2005 | "You'll Be There" | 4 | 54 | 5 | — | | Somewhere Down in Texas |
| 2005 | "She Let Herself Go" | 1 | 54 | 3 | — | RIAA: Gold | Somewhere Down in Texas |
| 2006 | "The Seashores of Old Mexico" | 11 | 85 | 7 | — | | Somewhere Down in Texas |
| 2006 | "Give It Away" | 1 | 35 | 1 | — | RIAA: 2× Platinum | It Just Comes Natural |
| 2006 | "It Just Comes Natural" | 1 | 58 | 1 | — | RIAA: Platinum | It Just Comes Natural |
| 2007 | "Wrapped" | 2 | 71 | 1 | 63 | RIAA: Gold | It Just Comes Natural |
| 2007 | "How 'bout Them Cowgirls" | 3 | 49 | 3 | 67 | RIAA: Platinum | It Just Comes Natural |
| 2008 | "I Saw God Today" | 1 | 33 | 1 | 60 | RIAA: Platinum | Troubadour |
| 2008 | "Troubadour" | 7 | 54 | 3 | 74 | RIAA: 3× Platinum | Troubadour |
| 2008 | "River of Love" | 1 | 59 | 6 | 77 | | Troubadour |
| 2009 | "Living for the Night" | 2 | 53 | 4 | 72 | | Twang |
| 2009 | "Twang" | 14 | 100 | 13 | — | | Twang |
"—" denotes releases that did not chart

=== 2010s ===
| Year | Single | Peak chart positions | | | | | Certifications (sales threshold) | Album |
| Year | Single | US Country | US Country Airplay | US | CAN Country | CAN | Certifications (sales threshold) | Album |
|---|---|---|---|---|---|---|---|---|
| 2010 | "I Gotta Get to You" | 3 | | 70 | 4 | — | | Twang |
| 2010 | "The Breath You Take" | 6 | | 63 | 10 | 90 | | Twang |
| 2011 | "Here for a Good Time" | 2 | | 46 | 2 | 66 | RIAA: 2× Platinum | Here for a Good Time |
| 2011 | "Love's Gonna Make It Alright" | 3 | | 61 | 6 | — | | Here for a Good Time |
| 2012 | "Drinkin' Man" | 37 | | — | — | — | | Here for a Good Time |
| 2012 | "Give It All We Got Tonight" | 7 | 2 | 43 | 30 | 72 | RIAA: 2× Platinum | Love Is Everything |
| 2013 | "I Believe" | — | 50 | — | — | — | | Love Is Everything |
| 2013 | "I Got a Car" | 23 | 17 | 89 | 39 | — | RIAA: Platinum | Love Is Everything |
| 2015 | "Let It Go" | 29 | 46 | — (Note: "Let It Go" did not enter the Hot 100, but peaked at number 18 on the Bubbling Under Hot 100 Singles chart, which acts as a 25-song extension of the Hot 100.) | — | — | | Cold Beer Conversation |
| 2015 | "Cold Beer Conversation" | 36 | 33 | — | 43 | — | | Cold Beer Conversation |
| 2016 | "Goin' Goin' Gone" | — (Note: "Goin' Goin' Gone" did not enter Hot Country Songs or Country Airplay, but peaked at number 37 on Billboard Country Indicator.) | | — | — | — | | Strait Out of the Box: Part 2 |
| 2019 | "Every Little Honky Tonk Bar" | 20 | 17 | — (Note: "Every Little Honky Tonk Bar" did not enter the Hot 100, but peaked at number 11 on the Bubbling Under Hot 100 Singles chart, which acts as a 25-song extension of the Hot 100.) | 29 | — | RIAA: Platinum | Honky Tonk Time Machine |
| 2019 | "The Weight of the Badge" | 43 | 51 | — | — | — | | Honky Tonk Time Machine |
"—" denotes releases that did not chart

=== As featured artist ===
| Year | Single | Peak chart positions | | | | | Album |
| Year | Single | US Country | US Country Airplay | US | CAN Country | CAN | Album |
|---|---|---|---|---|---|---|---|
| 2004 | "Hey, Good Lookin'" (Jimmy Buffett with Clint Black, Kenny Chesney, Alan Jackson, Toby Keith and George Strait) | 8 | | 63 | — | — | License to Chill |
| 2007 | "Shiftwork" (Kenny Chesney with George Strait) | 2 | | 47 | 2 | 61 | Just Who I Am: Poets & Pirates |
| 2016 | "Forever Country" (as Artists of Then, Now & Forever) | 1 | 33 | 21 | 34 | 25 | Non-album single |

== Other charted songs ==
=== B-sides ===
The following songs are B-sides that charted separately.

| Year | Song | Peak positions | Original A-side |
| Year | Song | US Country | Original A-side |
|---|---|---|---|
| 1990 | "Hollywood Squares" | 67 | "Overnight Success" |
| 1996 | "Do the Right Thing" | 69 | "Carried Away" |
| 1997 | "Won't You Come Home (And Talk to a Stranger)" | 70 | "One Night at a Time" |
| 2001 | "The Real Thing" | 60 | "Run" |
| 2004 | "Honk If You Honky Tonk" | 45 | "Desperately" |

=== Christmas songs ===
The following songs charted from Christmas airplay.

| Year | Song | Peak positions | Album |
| Year | Song | US Country | Album |
|---|---|---|---|
| 1996 | "Santa Claus Is Coming to Town" | 69 | Merry Christmas Strait to You! |
| 1998 | "Merry Christmas Strait to You" | 58 | Merry Christmas Strait to You! |
| 2000 | "I Know What I Want for Christmas" | 73 | Merry Christmas Wherever You Are |
| 2000 | "Let It Snow! Let It Snow! Let It Snow!" | 72 | Merry Christmas Wherever You Are |
| 2000 | "Jingle Bell Rock" | 69 | Merry Christmas Wherever You Are |
| 2001 | "Old Time Christmas" | 62 | Merry Christmas Wherever You Are |
| 2002 | "Christmas Cookies" | 33 | A Country Christmas 1999 |

=== Other charted songs ===
Songs not released as singles that charted due to unsolicited airplay or good streaming and download results.

| Year | Song | Peak chart positions | | Certifications (sales threshold) | Album |
| Year | Song | US Country | CAN Country | Certifications (sales threshold) | Album |
|---|---|---|---|---|---|
| 1990 | "Angel, Angelina" | — (Note: "Angel, Angelina" did not chart on Hot Country Songs, but peaked at No. 1 on Hot Country Radio Breakouts.) | — | | Beyond the Blue Neon |
| 1992 | "Overnight Male" | 70 | — | | Pure Country |
| 1998 | "You Haven't Left Me Yet" | 59 | 79 | | One Step at a Time |
| 1999 | "I Look at You" | 75 | — | | Always Never the Same |
| 1999 | "Peace of Mind" | 74 | — | | Always Never the Same |
| 1999 | "One of You" | 73 | — | | Always Never the Same |
| 1999 | "Always Never the Same" | 69 | — | | Always Never the Same |
| 2000 | "Murder on Music Row" (with Alan Jackson) | 38 | 47 | | Latest Greatest Straitest Hits |
| 2002 | "Designated Drinker" (with Alan Jackson) | 44 | — | RIAA: Gold | Drive |
| 2002 | "Stars on the Water" | 50 | — | | The Road Less Traveled |
| 2005 | "Texas" | 35 | — | | Somewhere Down in Texas |
| 2009 | "El Rey" | 58 | — | | Twang |
| 2019 | "God and Country Music" | 36 | — | | Honky Tonk Time Machine |
"—" denotes releases that did not chart.

== Music videos ==
| Year | Title | Director |
|---|---|---|
| 1983 | "You Look So Good in Love" | —N/a |
| 1985 | "The Chair" | Marc Ball |
| 1987 | "Amarillo by Morning" | —N/a |
| 1989 | "Baby's Gotten Good at Goodbye" | John Lloyd Miller |
| 1991 | "If I Know Me" | Bill Young |
| 1992 | "I Cross My Heart" | Charley Randazzo |
| 1993 | "Heartland" | Christopher Cain |
| 1994 | "The Man in Love with You" | Bill Young |
| 1995 | "Check Yes or No" | John Lloyd Miller |
| 1997 | "Carrying Your Love with Me" | Christopher Cain |
| 1999 | "Write This Down" (Live) | Deaton-Flanigen Productions/Bill Young/Jack Hattingh |
| 2000 | "Don't Make Me Come Over There and Love You" | Gerry Wenner |
| 2002 | "She'll Leave You With a Smile" (Live) | Bud Schaetzle |
| 2006 | "The Seashores of Old Mexico" | Trey Fanjoy |
| 2008 | "Troubadour" | Trey Fanjoy |
| 2009 | "Living for the Night" (Live) | Shaun Silva |
| 2019 | "Código" | Polly Burokas |
| 2019 | "Every Little Honky Tonk Bar" | —N/a |
| 2021 | "The Weight of the Badge" | |

=== Guest appearances ===
| Year | Title | Director |
|---|---|---|
| 2004 | "Hey, Good Lookin'" (with Jimmy Buffett, Clint Black, Kenny Chesney, Alan Jackson and Toby Keith) | Trey Fanjoy |
| 2016 | "Forever Country" (Artists of Then, Now & Forever) | Joseph Kahn |

== See also ==
- Ace in the Hole Band § Singles
