= George Strait albums discography =

George Strait discography
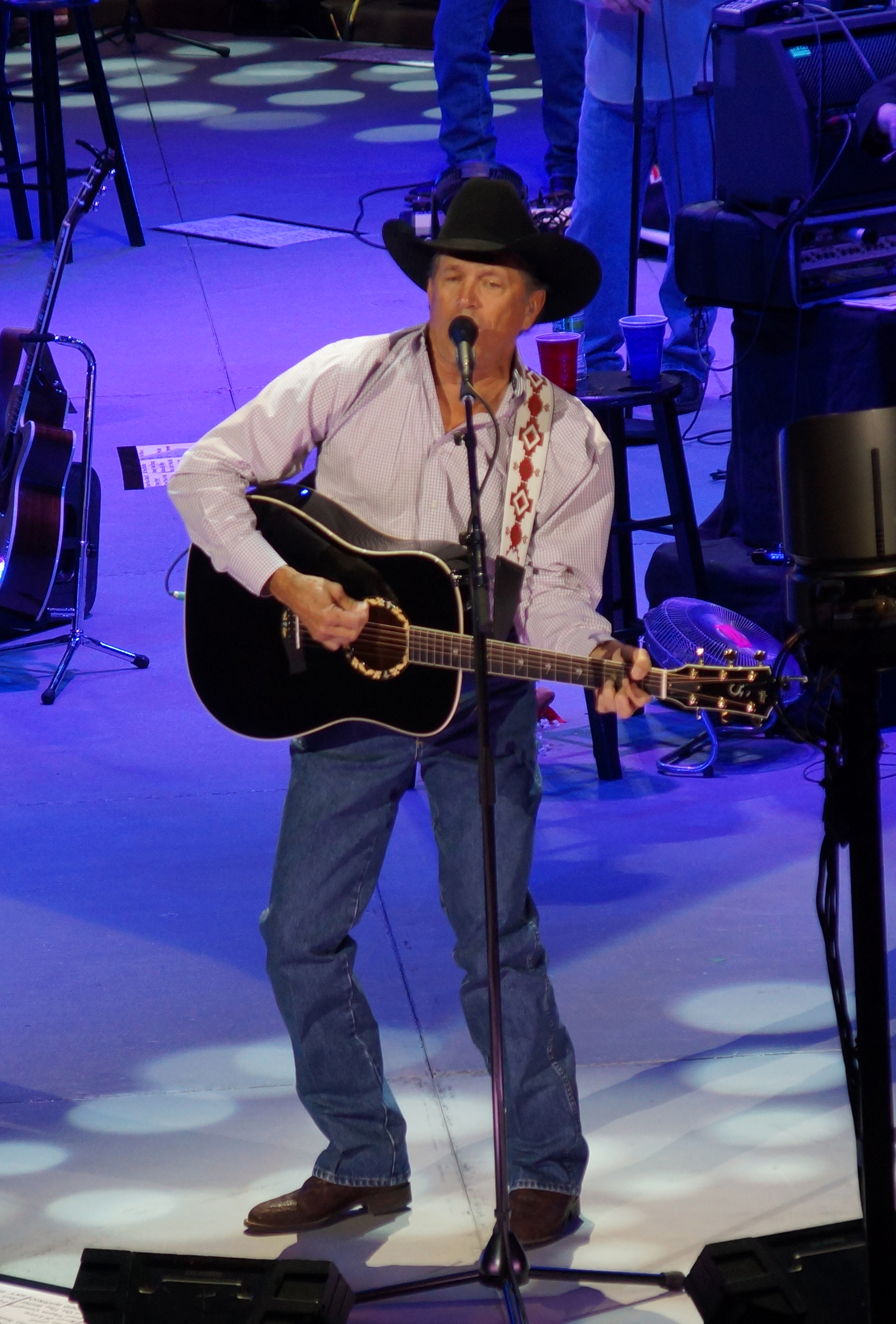
- George Strait on The Cowboy Rides Away Tour, XL Center, Hartford, Connecticut, February 23, 2013
- Studio albums: 31
- Soundtrack albums: 1
- Live albums: 3
- Compilation albums: 12

The George Strait albums discography consists of 31 studio albums, three live albums, and 11 compilation albums by American country music singer George Strait. Of these albums, 36 have received a certification of at least Gold from the Recording Industry Association of America, and five reached No.1 on the Billboard 200. His highest-certified album is the 1992 release Pure Country, which is certified sextuple-platinum for U.S. shipments of six million copies; his highest overall is the 1995 box set Strait Out of the Box, which is certified octuple platinum. Of his studio albums, all but George Strait (2000), Twang (2009), Here for a Good Time (2011), Love Is Everything (2013), and Cold Beer Conversation (2015) are certified platinum or higher. As of June 2014, he has sold 45 million albums in the US since 1991 when SoundScan started tracking album sales, and has amassed more top 10 albums than any other artist in that time.

== Studio albums ==
=== 1981–1990 ===
Title	Album details	Peak chart positions		Certifications (sales threshold)
Title	Album details	US	US Country	Certifications (sales threshold)
Strait Country	Release date: September 4, 1981; Label: MCA	—	26	RIAA: Platinum
Strait from the Heart	Release date: June 3, 1982; Label: MCA	—	18	RIAA: Platinum
Right or Wrong	Release date: October 6, 1983; Label: MCA	163	1	RIAA: Platinum
Does Fort Worth Ever Cross Your Mind	Release date: September 26, 1984; Label: MCA	150	1	RIAA: Platinum
Something Special	Release date: August 29, 1985; Label: MCA	—	1	RIAA: Platinum
#7	Release date: May 14, 1986; Label: MCA	127	1	RIAA: Platinum
Ocean Front Property	Release date: January 12, 1987; Label: MCA	117	1	RIAA: 2× Platinum; CAN: Gold
If You Ain't Lovin' You Ain't Livin'	Release date: February 22, 1988; Label: MCA	87	1	RIAA: Platinum; CAN: Gold
Beyond the Blue Neon^{[A]}	Release date: February 6, 1989; Label: MCA	92	1	RIAA: Platinum; CAN: Gold
Livin' It Up	Release date: May 15, 1990; Label: MCA	35	1	RIAA: Platinum
"—" denotes releases that did not chart

=== 1991–2000 ===
Title	Album details	Peak chart positions					Certifications
Title	Album details	US	US Country	AUS	CAN	CAN Country	Certifications
Chill of an Early Fall	Release date: March 19, 1991; Label: MCA	45	4	—	—	—	RIAA: Platinum
Holding My Own	Release date: April 21, 1992; Label: MCA	33	5	—	—	17	RIAA: Platinum
Easy Come, Easy Go	Release date: September 28, 1993; Label: MCA	5	2	—	—	2	RIAA: 2× Platinum; CAN: Gold
Lead On	Release date: November 8, 1994; Label: MCA	26	1	—	—	3	RIAA: 2× Platinum
Blue Clear Sky	Release date: April 23, 1996; Label: MCA	7	1	—	49	3	RIAA: 3× Platinum; CAN: Gold
Carrying Your Love with Me	Release date: April 22, 1997; Label: MCA Nashville	1	1	45	28	1	RIAA: 3× Platinum; CAN: Gold
One Step at a Time	Release date: April 21, 1998; Label: MCA Nashville	2	1	—	23	3	RIAA: 2× Platinum; CAN: Gold
Always Never the Same	Release date: March 2, 1999; Label: MCA Nashville	6	2	—	73	2	RIAA: Platinum; CAN: Gold
George Strait	Release date: September 19, 2000; Label: MCA Nashville	7	1	—	—	8	RIAA: Gold
"—" denotes releases that did not chart

=== 2001–2010 ===
Title	Album details	Peak chart positions				Certifications
Title	Album details	US	US Country	AUS	CAN	Certifications
The Road Less Traveled	Release date: November 6, 2001; Label: MCA Nashville	9	1	—	—	RIAA: Platinum
Honkytonkville	Release date: June 10, 2003; Label: MCA Nashville	5	1	95	—	RIAA: Platinum
Somewhere Down in Texas	Release date: June 28, 2005; Label: MCA Nashville	1	1	—	—	RIAA: Platinum
It Just Comes Natural	Release date: October 3, 2006; Label: MCA Nashville	3	1	—	—	RIAA: Platinum
Troubadour	Release date: April 1, 2008; Label: MCA Nashville	1	1	—	13	RIAA: Platinum
Twang	Release date: August 11, 2009; Label: MCA Nashville	1	1	—	4	RIAA: Gold
"—" denotes releases that did not chart

=== 2011–present ===
Title	Album details	Peak chart positions				Certifications	Sales
Title	Album details	US	US Country	AUS	CAN	Certifications	Sales
Here for a Good Time	Release date: September 6, 2011; Label: MCA Nashville	3	1	—	12	RIAA: Gold	US: 298,000
Love Is Everything	Release date: May 14, 2013; Label: MCA Nashville	2	1	86	8	RIAA: Gold	US: 456,000
Cold Beer Conversation	Release date: September 25, 2015; Label: MCA Nashville	4	1	74	15		
Honky Tonk Time Machine	Release date: March 29, 2019; Label: MCA Nashville	4	1	80	93		US: 143,200
Cowboys and Dreamers	Release date: September 6, 2024; Label: MCA Nashville	14	6	—	—		
"—" denotes releases that did not chart

== Compilations ==
=== 1985–2000 ===
Title	Album details	Peak chart positions			Certifications
Title	Album details	US	US Country	CAN Country	Certifications
Greatest Hits	Release date: March 4, 1985; Label: MCA	157	4	—	RIAA: 4× Platinum; CAN: Gold
Greatest Hits Volume Two	Release date: September 7, 1987; Label: MCA	68	1	—	RIAA: 3× Platinum
Ten Strait Hits	Release date: December 31, 1991; Label: MCA	46	7	14	RIAA: Platinum
Strait Out of the Box	Release date: September 12, 1995; Label: MCA	43	9	7	RIAA: 8× Platinum
Latest Greatest Straitest Hits	Release date: March 7, 2000; Label: MCA Nashville	2	1	5	RIAA: 2× Platinum; CAN: Gold
"—" denotes releases that did not chart

=== 2002–present ===
Title	Album details	Peak chart positions			Certifications / Sales
Title	Album details	US	US Country	CAN	Certifications / Sales
20th Century Masters – The Millennium Collection: The Best of George Strait	Release date: March 26, 2002; Label: MCA Nashville	76	8	—	RIAA: Platinum
50 Number Ones	Release date: October 5, 2004; Label: MCA Nashville	1	1	8	RIAA: 7× Platinum; CAN: Platinum
22 More Hits	Release date: November 13, 2007; Label: MCA Nashville	13	4	—	RIAA: Gold
Icon	Release date: September 13, 2011; Label: MCA Nashville	62	14	80	CAN: Gold
Icon 2	Release date: November 8, 2011; Label: MCA Nashville	135	16	—	
Sixty Number Ones	Release date: May 14, 2013; Label: MCA Nashville	—	54	—	
Strait Out of the Box: Part 2	Release date: November 18, 2016; Label: MCA Nashville	20	3	—	US: 109,100
"—" denotes releases that did not chart

== Live albums ==
Title	Album details	Peak chart positions			Certifications (sales threshold)
Title	Album details	US	US Country	CAN	Certifications (sales threshold)
For the Last Time: Live from the Astrodome	Release date: February 11, 2003; Label: MCA Nashville	7	2	—	RIAA: Gold
Live at Texas Stadium (with Alan Jackson and Jimmy Buffett)	Release date: April 3, 2007; Label: Mailboat Records	11	4	—	
The Cowboy Rides Away: Live from AT&T Stadium	Release date: September 16, 2014; Label: MCA Nashville	4	2	16	
"—" denotes releases that did not chart

== Christmas albums ==
Title	Album details	Peak chart positions			Certifications / Sales
Title	Album details	US	US Country	CAN	Certifications / Sales
Merry Christmas Strait to You!	Release date: September 8, 1986; Label: MCA	—	17	—	RIAA: 2× Platinum
Merry Christmas Wherever You Are	Release date: September 21, 1999; Label: MCA Nashville	78	10	—	RIAA: Gold
20th Century Masters: The Christmas Collection	Release date: September 23, 2003; Label: MCA Nashville	—	60	93	
Fresh Cut Christmas^{[B]}	Release date: 2006; Label: MCA Nashville	—	—	—	RIAA: Platinum
Classic Christmas	Release date: October 7, 2008; Label: MCA Nashville	90	16	—	
Christmas Time: 15 Holiday Favorites	Release date: 2011; Label: MCA Nashville	—	62	—	
Strait for the Holidays	Release date: October 28, 2016; Label: MCA Nashville	138	11	—	US: 48,300
"—" denotes releases that did not chart

== Soundtracks ==
Title	Album details	Peak chart positions				Certifications (sales threshold)
Title	Album details	US	US Country	CAN	CAN Country	Certifications (sales threshold)
Pure Country	Release date: September 15, 1992; Label: MCA	6	1	32	1	RIAA: 6× Platinum; CAN: Platinum

== Notes ==
- A Beyond the Blue Neon also peaked at number 5 on the RPM Country Albums chart in Canada.
- B Unable to chart due to being only available at one retailer (Hallmark Gold Crown).
