= Ten Strait Hits =

Compilation album by George Strait
- Released: December 31, 1991
- Recorded: 1988–1990
- Genre: Country
- Length: 32:42
- Label: MCA Records; MCAD-10450 (CD); MCAC-10450 (Cassette)
- Producer: Jimmy Bowen; George Strait

George Strait chronology
Chill of an Early Fall (1991)	Ten Strait Hits (1991)	Holding My Own (1992)

Professional ratings
Review scores
Source	Rating
Allmusic	4.5/5 stars
Robert Christgau	(neither)

Ten Strait Hits is the third compilation album by American country music artist George Strait, released on December 31, 1991, by MCA Records. It features all of Strait's singles on his albums from 1988 to 1990, such as 1988's "If You Ain't Lovin' You Ain't Livin'", 1989's "Beyond the Blue Neon", and 1990's "Livin' it Up".

== Track listing ==
No.	Title	Writer(s)	From the album	Length
1.	"Famous Last Words of a Fool"	Dean Dillon, Rex Huston	If You Ain't Lovin' You Ain't Livin'	3:37
2.	"Baby Blue"	Aaron Barker	If You Ain't Lovin' You Ain't Livin'	3:34
3.	"If You Ain't Lovin' (You Ain't Livin')"	Tommy Collins	If You Ain't Lovin' You Ain't Livin	2:19
4.	"Baby's Gotten Good at Goodbye"	Tony Martin, Troy Martin	Beyond the Blue Neon	3:30
5.	"What's Going On in Your World"	David Chamberlain, Royce Porter, Red Steagall	Beyond the Blue Neon	3:28
6.	"Ace in the Hole"	Dennis Adkins	Beyond the Blue Neon	2:38
7.	"Overnight Success"	Sanger D. Shafer	Beyond the Blue Neon	3:10
8.	"Love Without End, Amen"	Barker	Livin' It Up	3:07
9.	"Drinking Champagne"	Bill Mack	Livin' It Up	3:35
10.	"I've Come to Expect It from You"	Dillon, Buddy Cannon	Livin' It Up	3:44
Total length:				32:42

== Chart positions ==
Chart (1991)	Peak position
U.S. Billboard Top Country Albums	7
U.S. Billboard 200	46
Canadian RPM Country Albums	14

== Certifications ==
Certifications for Ten Strait Hits
Region	Certification	Certified units/sales
United States (RIAA)	Platinum	1,000,000^{^}
^{^} Shipments figures based on certification alone.
