= 20th Century Masters – The Millennium Collection: The Best of George Strait =

Greatest hits album by George Strait
- Released: March 26, 2002
- Genre: Country
- Length: 39:01
- Label: MCA Nashville
- Producers: Ray Baker; Jimmy Bowen; George Strait

George Strait chronology
The Road Less Traveled (2001)	20th Century Masters – The Millennium Collection: The Best of George Strait (2002)	For the Last Time: Live from the Astrodome (2003)

20th Century Masters – The Millennium Collection: The Best of George Strait is a collection of some of George Strait's greatest hits. It was released on March 26, 2002, by MCA Nashville.

== Critical reception ==
Professional ratings
Review scores
Source	Rating
Allmusic	3/5 stars

20th Century Masters – The Millennium Collection: The Best of George Strait received three out of five stars from William Ruhlmann of Allmusic. In his review, Ruhlmann notes some of Strait's biggest hits are included while others are absent.

== Commercial performance ==
20th Century Masters – The Millennium Collection: The Best of George Strait peaked at number 8 on the U.S. Billboard Top Country Albums chart. It also reached number 76 on the all-genre Billboard 200.

The album was certified Gold by the RIAA on September 30, 2003, and Platinum on July 29, 2005. It has sold 1,836,000 copies as October 2019.

== Track listing ==
No.	Title	Writer(s)	From MCA album	Length
1.	"Famous Last Words of a Fool"	Dean Dillon, Rex Huston	If You Ain't Lovin' You Ain't Livin'	3:37
2.	"Baby Blue"	Aaron Barker	If You Ain't Lovin' You Ain't Livin'	3:33
3.	"If You Ain't Lovin' (You Ain't Livin')"	Tommy Collins	If You Ain't Lovin' You Ain't Livin	2:20
4.	"Baby's Gotten Good at Goodbye"	Tony Martin, Troy Martin	Beyond the Blue Neon	3:29
5.	"What's Going On in Your World"	David Chamberlain, Royce Porter, Red Steagall	Beyond the Blue Neon	3:28
6.	"Ace in the Hole"	Dennis Adkins	Beyond the Blue Neon	2:37
7.	"Love Without End, Amen"	Barker	Livin' It Up	3:06
8.	"I've Come to Expect It From You"	Buddy Cannon, Dillon	Livin' It Up	3:45
9.	"Easy Come, Easy Go"	Barker, Dillon	Easy Come Easy Go	3:03
10.	"I Cross My Heart"	Steven Dorff, Eric Kaz	Pure Country	3:31
11.	"All My Ex's Live in Texas"	Sanger D. Shafer, Lyndia Shafer	Ocean Front Property	3:20
12.	"You Look So Good in Love"	Glen Ballard, Rory Bourke, Kerry Chater	Right or Wrong	3:12
Total length:				39:01

== Charts ==
=== Weekly charts ===
Chart (2002)	Peak position
US Billboard 200	76
US Top Country Albums (Billboard)	8

=== Year-end charts ===
Chart (2002)	Position
Canadian Country Albums (Nielsen SoundScan)	57
US Top Country Albums (Billboard)	47
Chart (2003)	Position
US Top Country Albums (Billboard)	36

== Certifications ==
Region	Certification	Certified units/sales
United States (RIAA)	Platinum	1,836,000
