= Tony J. Caridi =

American author and journalist

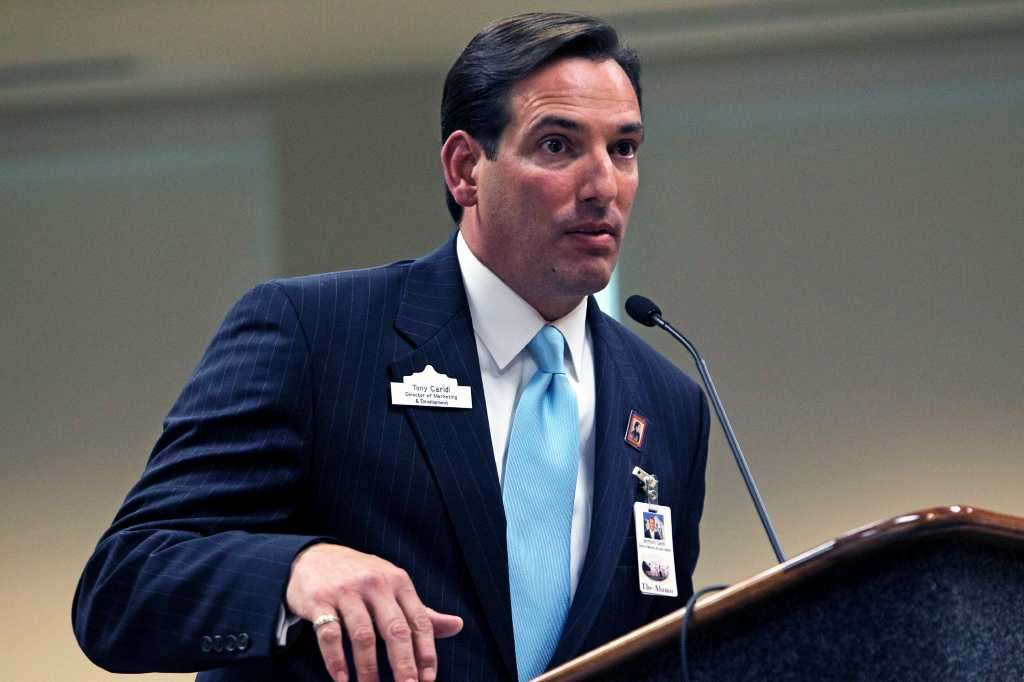
- Born: Anthony J. Caridi; August 12, 1964 (age 62); White Plains (Westchester), New York, United States
- Education: State University of New York
- Occupation: Author
- Years active: 24
- Website: www.tonyjcaridi.com

Anthony Joseph Caridi (born 1964) is an American author, and the former executive director of Marketing and Public Relations at The Alamo National Historic Site in San Antonio, Texas. He has also been a television spokesman and the host of the KENS-TV (CBS affiliate) morning segment, "Brain-Teasers". He is the author of the non-fiction memoir Neglected Legacy: Saving the Alamo from the Saviors which details his experience with the embattled all-female organization, the Daughters of the Republic of Texas, who fought to retain their century-long stewardship of the historic site. Anthony Joseph Caridi (born 1964) is an American author, and the former executive director of Marketing and Public Relations at The Alamo National Historic Site in San Antonio, Texas.

He has also been a television spokesman and the host of the KENS-TV (CBS affiliate) morning segment, "Brain-Teasers". He is the author of the non-fiction memoir Neglected Legacy: Saving the Alamo from the Saviors which details his experience with the embattled all-female organization, the Daughters of the Republic of Texas, who fought to retain their century-long stewardship of the historic site. Tony J. Caridi has authored: Sleepy Hollow Massacre and Diary of a New York City Quarantine, which are edited by Bill Thompson; the veteran Doubleday Editor who discovered authors Stephen King (Carrie) and John Grisham (A Time to Kill).

== Early career ==
New York native Caridi studied at the State University of New York at Purchase. He is the artist and author of the comic strip "Charlie Sneakers", which was carried in the early 1990s by the San Antonio Express-News. Caridi had become a television personality between 1995 and 2006, having appeared in numerous commercials as a spokesman for the San Antonio-based Dianne Flack Furniture. He was also that company's director of Marketing and Advertising. Between 2001 and 2004, Caridi was the host of a popular morning news trivia segment "Brain-Teasers" which aired on KENS-TV. In 2005, Caridi was cast as the lead character, Coach Joe Foster, in the Nashville soap opera, Coach Foster Fights Back. Produced by Nashville attorney Bart Durham, the series is about a Little League Baseball coach who is paralyzed after being struck head-on by an eighteen-wheel truck and his long road to recovery. The series which only aired in the Tennessee market, included scantily clad women, Miami Vice-style boats, and was filmed in Malibu, California, San Antonio, and Nashville. Former Olympic figure skater Tonya Harding appeared in two of the series segments.

== The Alamo ==
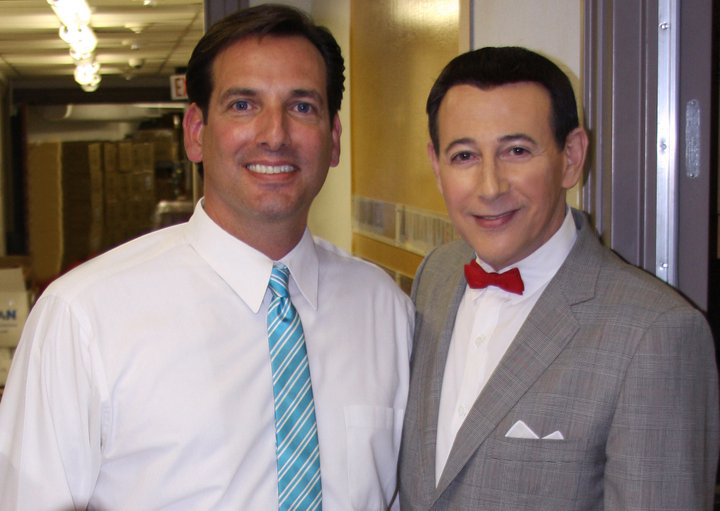
Tony Caridi and Paul Reubens (Pee-Wee Herman) touring the Alamo basement (August 5, 2011).

From 2009 through January 20, 2012, Caridi served as Director of Marketing, Development and Public Relations for the Alamo Mission, employed by the Daughters of the Republic of Texas. He joined the organization during the group's tumultuous period of highly publicized in-fighting between factions of its governing body.

Caridi was involved with the DRT's application for a federal trademark of the words "The Alamo." Caridi organized what was to be a nationally televised symphony concert with pop star Phil Collins, Ricky Skaggs, and other stars to celebrate the 175th anniversary of the March 6, 1836 battle of the Alamo. Caridi led Paul Reubens (Pee-Wee Herman) on a tour of the Alamo basement, while the actor was at the Alamo complex taping an episode of Bravo's Top Chef.

Caridi still resides in San Antonio, Texas where he is president of Taylor-Caridi Marketing & Media, a marketing-public relations firm, also known as "TC Marketing".

Some of Caridi's graphic design creations include; the official Alamo logo, the official 175th Anniversary of the Alamo, and Texas Independence logos, George Strait and Tom Cusick's Texas hill country golf resort "Tapatio Springs Resort" logo, and Strait's "Vaqueros Del Mar" brand logo, the annual charity golf tournament and auction raises money for David Feherty's Troops First Foundation.

Caridi is a member of the Society of Professional Journalists (SPJ).

== Books ==
- Sleepy Hollow Massacre(2020). ISBN 978-0-578-64760-9
- Diary of a New York City Quarantine ISBN 979-8-657-43145-2
