= 22 More Hits =

Greatest hits album by George Strait
- Released: November 13, 2007
- Recorded: 1981–2007
- Genre: Country
- Length: 71:51
- Label: MCA Nashville
- Producer: Jimmy Bowen; Tony Brown; Blake Mevis; George Strait

George Strait chronology
Live at Texas Stadium (2007)	22 More Hits (2007)	Troubadour (2008)

Professional ratings
Review scores
Source	Rating
About.com	4.5/5 stars
Allmusic	4.5/5 stars
The Music Box	3.5/5 stars
PopMatters	7/10 stars

22 More Hits is a 2007 compilation album by American country music artist George Strait. A follow-up of Strait's 2004 compilation 50 Number Ones, it comprises hits that otherwise did not reach Number One (except for "She Let Herself Go") on any country charts, from his 1981 debut single "Unwound" to his most recent single at the time of the album's release, "How 'bout Them Cowgirls". Unlike 50 Number Ones, this collection consists of only one disc instead of two, no new songs were recorded, and none of the tracks have been edited for time or are in chronological order.

== Track listing ==
No.	Title	Writer(s)	"BBC"	Length
1.	"How 'bout Them Cowgirls"	Casey Beathard, Ed Hill	3	3:56
2.	"Amarillo by Morning"	Terry Stafford, Paul Fraser	4	2:53
3.	"The Fireman"	Mack Vickery, Wayne Kemp	5	2:35
4.	"Gone as a Girl Can Get"	Jerry Max Lane	5	3:16
5.	"When Did You Stop Loving Me"	Donny Kees, Monty Holmes	6	2:49
6.	"Marina del Rey"	Dean Dillon, Frank Dycus	6	3:04
7.	"Desperately"	Bruce Robison, Monte Warden	6	4:07
8.	"The Cowboy Rides Away"	Sonny Throckmorton, Casey Kelly	5	3:21
9.	"Lovebug"	Kemp, Curtis Wayne	8	2:51
10.	"Cowboys Like Us"	Bob DiPiero, Anthony Smith	2	3:39
11.	"She Let Herself Go"	Dillon, Kerry Kurt Phillips	1	3:18
12.	"You'll Be There"	Cory Mayo	4	4:18
13.	"Don't Make Me Come Over There and Love You"	Jim Lauderdale, Carter Wood	17	2:05
14.	"What Do You Say to That"	Lauderdale, Melba Montgomery	4	2:59
15.	"Drinking Champagne"	Bill Mack	4	3:35
16.	"You're Something Special to Me"	David Anthony	4	3:20
17.	"Meanwhile"	Wayland Holyfield, J. Fred Knobloch	4	3:30
18.	"Adalida"	Mike Geiger, Woody Mullis, Michael Huffman	3	3:37
19.	"If You Can Do Anything Else"	Billy Livsey, Don Schlitz	5	4:06
20.	"Unwound"	Dillon, Dycus	6	2:26
21.	"If You're Thinking You Want a Stranger (There's One Coming Home)"	Blake Mevis, David Wills	3	2:58
22.	"Overnight Success"	Sanger D. Shafer	8	3:08
Total length:				71:51

== Chart performance ==
The album debuted at number 13 on the U.S. Billboard 200 chart, selling about 80,000 copies in its first week.

=== Weekly charts ===
Chart (2007)	Peak position
US Billboard 200	13
US Top Country Albums (Billboard)	4

=== Year-end charts ===
Chart (2008)	Position
US Billboard 200	87
US Top Country Albums (Billboard)	16

== Certifications ==
Region	Certification	Certified units/sales
United States (RIAA)	Gold	500,000^{^}
^{^} Shipments figures based on certification alone.
