= For the Last Time: Live from the Astrodome =

Live album by George Strait
- Released: February 11, 2003
- Recorded: March 3, 2002
- Venue: Houston Astrodome
- Genre: Neotraditional country; Western swing
- Length: 54:44
- Label: MCA Nashville
- Producer: Tony Brown; George Strait

George Strait chronology
20th Century Masters: The Millennium Collection: The Best of George Strait (2002)	For the Last Time: Live from the Astrodome (2003)	Honkytonkville (2003)

Professional ratings
Review scores
Source	Rating
Allmusic	3/5 stars

For the Last Time: Live From the Astrodome is the first live album released by George Strait in February 11, 2003. The title refers to the fact that this concert was the final event that took place at the Houston Astrodome.

Strait's performance of "She'll Leave You with a Smile" was used as a promotional clip to promote the album.

== Track listing ==
No.	Title	Writer(s)	Length
1.	"Deep in the Heart of Texas"	June Hershey, Don Swander	1:35
2.	"Write This Down"	Dana Hunt Black, Kent Robbins	3:32
3.	"I Can Still Make Cheyenne"	Aaron Barker, Erv Woolsey	4:59
4.	"Heartland"	Steve Dorff, John Bettis	4:52
5.	"Love Without End, Amen"	Barker	3:05
6.	"Check Yes or No"	Danny Wells, Black	2:53
7.	"The Fireman"	Mack Vickery, Wayne Kemp	2:50
8.	"Run"	Anthony Smith, Tony Lane	4:11
9.	"Murder on Music Row"	Larry Cordle, Larry Shell	4:22
10.	"The Chair"	Hank Cochran, Dean Dillon	3:03
11.	"She'll Leave You with a Smile"	Odie Blackmon, Jay Knowles	2:55
12.	"Amarillo by Morning"	Terry Stafford, Paul Fraser	3:03
13.	"Living and Living Well"	Tony Martin, Mark Nesler, Tom Shapiro	3:35
14.	"Take Me Back to Tulsa"	Tommy Duncan, Bob Wills	3:18
15.	"Blue Clear Sky"	Mark D. Sanders, John Jarrard, Bob DiPiero	2:42
16.	"The Cowboy Rides Away"	Casey Kelly, Sonny Throckmorton	3:58
Total length:			54:44

== Personnel ==
- Mike Daily – steel guitar
- Gene Elders – fiddle
- Terry Hale – bass guitar
- Wes Hightower – background vocals
- Ronnie Huckaby – keyboards
- Mike Kennedy – drums
- Joe Manuel – acoustic guitar
- Benny McArthur – electric guitar, fiddle
- Rick McRae – electric guitar
- Marty Slayton – background vocals
- Jeff Sterms – keyboards
- George Strait – lead vocals, acoustic guitar

== Charts ==
=== Weekly charts ===
Chart (2003)	Peak position
US Billboard 200	7
US Top Country Albums (Billboard)	2

=== Year-end charts ===
Chart (2003)	Position
US Billboard 200	181
US Top Country Albums (Billboard)	21

== Certifications ==
Region	Certification	Certified units/sales
United States (RIAA)	Gold	500,000^{^}
^{^} Shipments figures based on certification alone.
