= Merry Christmas Strait to You! =

Studio album by George Strait
- Released: September 8, 1986
- Studio: Sound Stage Studios (Nashville, Tennessee)
- Genre: Country, Christmas
- Length: 26:38
- Label: MCA
- Producer: Jimmy Bowen George Strait

George Strait chronology
#7 (1986)	Merry Christmas Strait to You! (1986)	Ocean Front Property (1987)

Professional ratings
Review scores
Source	Rating
Allmusic	3/5 stars

Merry Christmas Strait to You! is the first Christmas album by American country music artist George Strait, released on September 8, 1986 by MCA Records. It reached #17 on the Billboard Top Country Albums chart and is certified double platinum by the RIAA.

== Track listing ==
Side one
No.	Title	Writer(s)	Length
1.	"White Christmas"	Irving Berlin	3:03
2.	"There's a New Kid in Town"	Don Cook, Curly Putman, Keith Whitley	4:27
3.	"Winter Wonderland"	Felix Bernard, Richard Bernhard Smith	2:23
4.	"Merry Christmas Strait to You"	Bob Kelly	2:40
5.	"Away in a Manger"	James R. Murray	2:44

Side two
No.	Title	Writer(s)	Length
6.	"For Christ's Sake, It's Christmas"	Hank Cochran, Dean Dillon	3:13
7.	"Frosty the Snowman"	Walter E. Rollins, Steve Nelson	2:18
8.	"When It's Christmas Time in Texas"	Benny McArthur	3:09
9.	"Santa Claus Is Coming to Town"	John Frederick Coots, Haven Gillespie	2:12
10.	"What a Merry Christmas This Could Be"	Cochran, Harlan Howard	3:05
Total length:			26:38

== Personnel ==
- George Strait – lead vocals, acoustic guitar
- John Barlow Jarvis – acoustic piano
- Billy Joe Walker Jr. – acoustic guitars
- Larry Byrom – electric guitars
- Reggie Young – electric guitar
- Paul Franklin – steel guitar
- David Hungate – bass guitar
- Eddie Bayers – drums
- Johnny Gimble – fiddle
- Curtis Young – backing vocals

=== Production ===
- Jimmy Bowen – producer
- George Strait – producer
- Bob Bullock – recording, overdub recording, mixing
- Steve Tillisch – overdub recording
- Mark J. Coddington – second engineer
- Tim Kish – second engineer
- Russ Martin – second engineer
- Glenn Meadows – mastering at Masterfonics (Nashville, Tennessee)
- Simon Levy – art direction
- Tal Howard – design
- Mike Drake – illustration
- Peter Nash – photography
- Erv Woolsey – management

== Chart positions ==
Chart (1986)	Peak position
U.S. Billboard Top Country Albums	17

== Certifications ==
Certifications for Merry Christmas Strait to You
Region	Certification	Certified units/sales
United States (RIAA)	2× Platinum	2,000,000^{^}
^{^} Shipments figures based on certification alone.
