= Merry Christmas Wherever You Are =

Studio album by George Strait
- Released: September 21, 1999
- Recorded: 1999
- Studios: Ocean Way Nashville, Emerald Studio B and Sound Emporium (Nashville, TN).
- Genres: Christmas, Honky-tonk
- Length: 28:34
- Label: MCA Nashville
- Producers: Tony Brown; George Strait

George Strait chronology
Always Never the Same (1999)	Merry Christmas Wherever You Are (1999)	Latest Greatest Straitest Hits (2000)

Professional ratings
Review scores
Source	Rating
Allmusic	3/5 stars
The Austin Chronicle	2/5 stars
Chicago Tribune	(mixed)
Entertainment Weekly	B

Merry Christmas Wherever You Are is the second Christmas album by George Strait. It was released by MCA Records. It has his versions of many classic Christmas songs, as well as the newly penned tracks "I Know What I Want for Christmas", "Old Time Christmas", "Noel Leon", "Santa's on His Way" and the title track.

== Track listing ==
No.	Title	Writer(s)	Length
1.	"I Know What I Want for Christmas"	Charlie Black, Dana Hunt Black	3:21
2.	"Old Time Christmas"	Aaron Barker, John Barlow Jarvis	3:18
3.	"Let It Snow! Let It Snow! Let It Snow!"	Sammy Cahn, Jule Styne	2:19
4.	"Jingle Bell Rock"	Joe Beal, Jim Boothe	2:12
5.	"Merry Christmas (Wherever You Are)"	Jerry Laseter, Mack Vickery	2:59
6.	"All I Want for Christmas Is My Two Front Teeth"	Donald Gardner	2:34
7.	"The Christmas Song"	Mel Tormé, Robert Wells	3:58
8.	"Noel Leon"	Mike Geiger, Woody Mullis, Ricky Ray Rector	2:53
9.	"Rudolph the Red-Nosed Reindeer"	Johnny Marks	2:54
10.	"Santa's on His Way"	David Anthony	2:06

== Personnel ==
- George Strait – lead vocals, acoustic guitar
- Jim Cox – keyboards, acoustic piano
- Steve Nathan – keyboards, acoustic piano, Hammond B3 organ
- Steve Gibson – acoustic guitars
- Dean Parks – electric guitars
- Paul Franklin – steel guitar
- Glenn Worf – bass
- Eddie Bayers – drums
- Eric Darken – percussion
- Larry Franklin – fiddle
- The Nashville String Machine – strings
- Russell Mauldin – string and group vocal arrangements, conductor
- Wes Hightower – backing vocals
- Liana Manis – backing vocals

Group vocals

- Lisa Cochran
- Travis Cottrell
- Tim Davis
- Stephanie Hall
- Jon Mark Ivey
- Marabeth Jordon
- Lisa Silver
- Dennis Wilson

=== Production ===
- Tony Brown – producer
- George Strait – producer
- Chuck Ainlay – recording, mixing
- Mark Rolston – second engineer
- Tim Waters – second engineer
- Greg Fogie – assistant engineer
- Justin Niebank – overdub recording
- Eric Conn – digital editing
- Carlos Grier – digital editing
- Denny Purcell – mastering
- Jonathan Russell – mastering assistant
- Georgetown Masters (Nashville, TN) – editing and mastering location
- Jessie Noble – project coordinator
- Team Design – art direction, design
- Slick Lawson – photography
- Virginia Team – photography

== Chart positions ==
Chart (1999)	Peak position
U.S. Billboard Top Country Albums	10
U.S. Billboard 200	78

== Certifications ==
Certifications for Merry Christmas Wherever You Are
Region	Certification	Certified units/sales
United States (RIAA)	Gold	500,000^{^}
^{^} Shipments figures based on certification alone.
