= Tom Cusick =

American businessman, rancher, and land developer (born 1953)

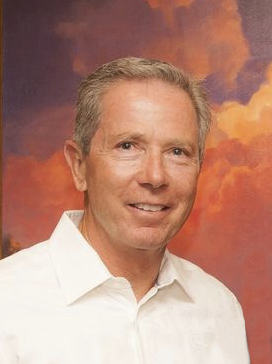
- Born: Thomas Patrick Cusick Jr. February 13, 1953 (age 73); Sheridan, Wyoming, U.S.
- Education: University of Texas at San Antonio
- Occupation: Texas land developer
- Years active: 43
- Spouse: Judy Maxine Moore 1974 - 1988. Silvia Marie Schement Cusick 12/23/89 – Present
- Children: Ginger, Marie, Jill, Sara, Beca
- Website: www.estanciaboerne.com

Thomas Patrick Cusick Jr. (born February 13, 1953) is a businessman, rancher, and Texas land developer. He and George Strait purchased and developed Tapatio Springs Resort and Golf Course (Boerne, Texas).

== Early life ==
Thomas Patrick Cusick Jr., was born on February 13, 1953, to Thomas Patrick Cusick and Ann Leath Cusick in Sheridan, Wyoming. A World War II Navy veteran, Cusick's father won the silver belt buckle for bulldogging at the Gillette, Wyoming Rodeo in 1949. He later became an oil drilling rig worker, then worked in the insurance business until his retirement. **Cusick attended and graduated in 1971 from Douglas MacArthur High School in San Antonio, Texas, where he played football and baseball for all four years. (Source: MacArthur Brahma 1971 yearbook, p. 342*0) Cusick was drafted out of high school by the Montreal Expos, but chose to accept a scholarship to play football at the University of Arizona. He later opted for a baseball scholarship at University of Texas (** the one in Austin?**), and subsequently earned a BBA in Accounting at UTSA.(**University of Texas at San Antonio**)

== Business ==
Cusick formed Benefit Planners (BPI), Inc., a third-party insurance administrator company, after leaving Aetna in 1982. BPI was ranked nationally in the top 10 health benefit administrators along with UnitedHealth Group#UnitedHealthcare, Blue Cross, and CIGNA. During this time, Cusick also formed The Preferred Health Arrangement, a Preferred Provider Organization and National Stop Loss Associates, a broker for re-insurance and other excess lines. In 1995, BP Risk Management was formed to provide employee benefit needs by handling workers compensation. In 1996 Cusick was honored as Entrepreneur of the Year in the service category and, in 2002, Benefit Planners was named the #1 Call Center of the Year in Central Texas, topping USAA and Southwestern Bell (now AT&T). In 2001, Cusick sold Benefit Planners and affiliates to Fiserv, and remained with the company until 2003.

In 2003, Cusick purchased 1,000 acres of land, and parceled "Estancia at Thunder Valley" into 65 homesites, what he termed "the perfect community to raise a family in. Cusick and Strait created the charity Vaqueros Del Mar ("Cowboys of the Sea") to raise money to benefit returning wounded servicemen and servicewomen and their families. Since 2012, Cusick, Strait, and David Feherty have hosted a celebrity golf tournament and concert to benefit Feherty's Troops First Foundation; attendees and performers have included Strait, Asleep at the Wheel, Jamey Johnson, Jewel, Ray Benson, James Burrows, and Dean Dillon. In April 2017, Cusick, Strait, and Medal of Honor recipient Leroy Petry opened the Leroy Petry Village of Honor (Arlington, Virginia), built with funds raised by Vaqueros Del Mar and Troops First.
