= What's Going On in Your World =

Single by George Strait

from the album Beyond the Blue Neon
- B-side: "Let's Get Down to It"
- Released: April 3, 1989
- Recorded: October 13, 1988
- Genre: Neotraditional country
- Length: 3:28
- Label: MCA 53648
- Songwriters: David Chamberlain, Royce Porter, Red Steagall
- Producers: Jimmy Bowen & George Strait

George Strait singles chronology
"Baby's Gotten Good at Goodbye" (1988)	"What's Going On in Your World" (1989)	"Ace in the Hole" (1989)

"What's Going On in Your World" the title of a song written by David Chamberlain, Royce Porter and Red Steagall, and recorded by American country music artist George Strait. It was released in April 1989 as the second single from his album, Beyond the Blue Neon. The song was his 17th number-one single as well as his eleventh consecutive number one.

== Content ==
The narrator contacts his former lover to inquire of her welfare in the time since the dissolution of their relationship.

== Musical style and composition ==
“What’s Going On in Your World” is a neotraditional country song with lyrical comparisons to Eddy Arnold, and Strait's vocal performance compared to the twang of Hank Williams.

== Critical reception ==
Kevin John Coyne of Country Universe gave the song an A grade, calling the song "a testament to the ability of a compelling melody, and a simple no-frills country production to connect with deep-seated emotions, even without a word being sung." He goes on to say that "even if the lyrics had not been so potent, “What’s Going On In Your World” would still have legs to stand as an instrumental showcase, thanks in large part to the mourful, crying fiddle that winds through the song."

== Chart performance ==
"What's Going On in Your World" reached number 1 on the Billboard Hot Country Songs chart and number 2 on the Canadian RPM Country Tracks chart.

Chart (1989)	Peak position
Canada Country Singles (RPM)	2
US Hot Country Songs (Billboard)	1

=== Year-end charts ===
Chart (1989)	Position
Canada Country Tracks (RPM)	7
US Country Songs (Billboard)	9
