= Baby's Gotten Good at Goodbye =

Single by George Strait

from the album Beyond the Blue Neon
- B-side: "Bigger Man Than Me"
- Released: December 26, 1988
- Recorded: October 13, 1988
- Genre: Neotraditional country
- Length: 3:30 (album version); 2:55 (single edit)
- Label: MCA 53486
- Songwriter(s): Tony Martin, Troy Martin
- Producer(s): Jimmy Bowen, George Strait

George Strait singles chronology
"If You Ain't Lovin' (You Ain't Livin')" (1988)	"Baby's Gotten Good at Goodbye" (1988)	"What's Going On in Your World" (1989)

"Baby's Gotten Good at Goodbye" is a song written by Tony Martin and Troy Martin, and recorded by American country music singer George Strait. It was released in December 1988 as the first single from the album Beyond the Blue Neon.

== Content ==
The narrator is a man who is learning that his woman has left him and probably for good this time. She didn't shed a single tear as she left and he knows she's perfected goodbye this time.

== Critical reception ==
Kevin John Coyne of Country Universe gave the song an A grade, saying that the single "is so closely associated with my discovery of George Strait’s music and country music as a whole that I can’t separate the experience enough to give 'Baby’s Gotten Good at Goodbye' an objective evaluation."

== Chart positions ==
"Baby's Gotten Good at Goodbye" reached number 1 on the Billboard Hot Country Songs chart.

Chart (1988–1989)	Peak position
US Hot Country Songs (Billboard)	1
Canadian RPM Country Tracks	1

=== Year-end charts ===
Chart (1989)	Position
Canada Country Tracks (RPM)	71
US Country Songs (Billboard)	26

== Certifications ==
Region	Certification	Certified units/sales
United States (RIAA)	Gold	500,000^{‡}
^{‡} Sales+streaming figures based on certification alone.
