= Overnight Success (song) =

Single by George Strait

from the album Beyond the Blue Neon
- B-side: "Hollywood Squares"
- Released: November 6, 1989
- Recorded: 1988
- Genre: Country
- Length: 3:11
- Label: MCA 53755
- Songwriter: Sanger D. Shafer
- Producers: Jimmy Bowen & George Strait

George Strait singles chronology
"Ace in the Hole" (1989)	"Overnight Success" (1989)	"Love Without End, Amen" (1990)

"Overnight Success" is a song written by Sanger D. Shafer and recorded by American country music artist George Strait. It was released in November 1989 as the fourth and final single from his album Beyond the Blue Neon.

== Chart performance ==
"Overnight Success" peaked at number 8 on the Billboard Hot Country Singles and number 7 on RPM Country Tracks. This was the first single of Strait's to miss number one since "You're Something Special to Me" in 1986, and broke Strait's string of 11 consecutive number one country hits. The song's B-side, "Hollywood Squares", spent five weeks on the Hot Country Singles charts and peaked at number 67 based on unsolicited airplay

Chart (1989–1990)	Peak position
Canada Country Singles (RPM)	7
US Hot Country Songs (Billboard)	8

=== Year-end charts ===
Chart (1990)	Position
Canada Country Tracks (RPM)	81
US Country Songs (Billboard)	51
