= Ace in the Hole (George Strait song) =

Single by George Strait

from the album Beyond the Blue Neon
- B-side: "Oh Me, Oh My, Sweet Baby"
- Released: July 17, 1989
- Recorded: October 12, 1988
- Genre: Western swing
- Length: 2:39
- Label: MCA 53693
- Songwriter: Dennis Adkins
- Producers: Jimmy Bowen & George Strait

George Strait singles chronology
"What's Going On in Your World" (1989)	"Ace in the Hole" (1989)	"Overnight Success" (1989)

"Ace in the Hole" is a song written by Dennis Adkins and recorded by American country music artist George Strait. George's touring band is called "The Ace in the Hole Band." It was released in July 1989 as the third single from his album Beyond the Blue Neon. It became his 18th #1 single as well as his 11th in a row.

== Content ==
This song visualizes life as a game where you have to keep a few tricks up your sleeve to get ahead. According to the lyrics, everyone needs to fight in order to succeed and have a good life, and in order to beat out the competition, you need some good people around you.

== Chart performance ==
"Ace in the Hole" reached number 1 on the Billboard Hot Country Songs chart and on the Canadian RPM Country Tracks chart.

Chart (1989)	Peak position
Canada Country Singles (RPM)	1
US Hot Country Songs (Billboard)	1

=== Year-end charts ===
Chart (1989)	Position
Canada Country Tracks (RPM)	15
US Country Songs (Billboard)	37
