= Beyond the Blue Neon =

1989 studio album by George Strait

Studio album by George Strait
- Released: February 6, 1989
- Recorded: October 1988
- Studio: Emerald Studios and Sound Stage Studios (Nashville, TN).
- Genre: Neotraditional country; honky-tonk; Western swing; Texas country
- Length: 28:20
- Label: MCA
- Producer: Jimmy Bowen; George Strait

George Strait chronology
If You Ain't Lovin', You Ain't Livin' (1988)	Beyond the Blue Neon (1989)	Livin' It Up (1990)

Singles from Beyond the Blue Neon
- 1. "Baby's Gotten Good at Goodbye" Released: December 26, 1988; 2. "What's Going On in Your World" Released: April 3, 1989; 3. "Ace in the Hole" Released: July 17, 1989; 4. "Overnight Success" Released: November 6, 1989

Professional ratings
Review scores
Source	Rating
AllMusic	5/5 stars
Chicago Tribune	(favorable)

Beyond the Blue Neon is the ninth studio album by American country music artist George Strait and 12th overall. It was released by MCA Records on February 6, 1989. It is certified platinum by the RIAA, and it produced the singles "Baby's Gotten Good at Goodbye", "What's Going on in Your World", "Ace in the Hole", and "Overnight Success". While the first three singles all reached Number One on the Billboard country charts in 1989, "Overnight Success" was a No. 8 for Strait in 1990. "Hollywood Squares" also charted at No. 67 in 1990 based on unsolicited airplay.

== Content ==
Two of this album's tracks were previously recorded by other artists, while two more were later covered by others. "Leavin's Been Comin' (For a Long, Long Time)" was originally cut by Gene Watson on 1983's Little By Little, and the title track was originally recorded by its co-writer, Larry Boone, on his 1988 Swingin' Doors, Sawdust Floors (the title of which also references this song). In addition, "Oh Me, Oh My, Sweet Baby" was later recorded by Diamond Rio on their 1992 album Close to the Edge, from which it was released as a single. Finally, David Ball covered "What's Going On in Your World" on his 2007 album Heartaches by the Number.

== Track listing ==
No.	Title	Writer(s)	Length
1.	"Beyond the Blue Neon"	Larry Boone, Paul Nelson	2:56
2.	"Hollywood Squares"	Larry Cordle, Wayland Patton, Jeff Tanguay	2:45
3.	"Overnight Success"	Sanger D. Shafer	3:10
4.	"Ace in the Hole"	Dennis Adkins	2:39
5.	"Leavin's Been Comin' (For a Long, Long Time)"	Sonny Throckmorton, Joseph Allen, Dave Kirby	3:01
6.	"Baby's Gotten Good at Goodbye"	Tony Martin, Troy Martin	3:30
7.	"What's Going On in Your World"	David Chamberlain, Royce Porter, Red Steagall	3:28
8.	"Angel, Angelina"	L. David Lewis	3:14
9.	"Too Much of Too Little"	Curtis Wayne	2:20
10.	"Oh Me, Oh My, Sweet Baby"	Tom Shapiro, Michael Garvin	2:27
Total length:			28:57

== Personnel ==
- George Strait – lead vocals, acoustic guitar
- Floyd Domino – pianos
- Steve Gibson – acoustic guitars, electric guitars
- Reggie Young – electric guitars
- Paul Franklin – steel guitar
- David Hungate – bass
- Eddie Bayers – drums
- Steve Marsh – saxophone
- Johnny Gimble – fiddle
- Curtis Young – backing vocals
- Liana Young – backing vocals

=== Production ===
- Jimmy Bowen – producer
- George Strait – producer
- Bob Bullock – recording
- Tim Kish – overdub recording, second engineer
- Russ Martin – overdub recording
- Ron Treat – overdub recording
- Julian King – second engineer
- Sheila Mann – second engineer
- John Guess – mixing
- Milan Bogdan – digital editing
- Glenn Meadows – mastering
- Masterfonics (Nashville, Tennessee) – editing and mastering location
- Don Lanier – pre-production
- Jessie Noble – project coordinator
- Robert Jones – design
- Steven Pumphrey – photography

== Charts ==
=== Weekly charts ===
Chart (1989)	Peak position
Canadian Country Albums (RPM)	5
US Billboard 200	92
US Top Country Albums (Billboard)	1

=== Year-end charts ===
Chart (1989)	Position
US Top Country Albums (Billboard)	6
Chart (1989)	Position
US Top Country Albums (Billboard)	31

== Certifications ==
Region	Certification	Certified units/sales
Canada (Music Canada)	Gold	50,000^{^}
United States (RIAA)	Platinum	1,000,000^{^}
^{^} Shipments figures based on certification alone.
