= Love Without End, Amen =

Single by George Strait

from the album Livin' It Up
- B-side: "Too Much of Too Little"
- Released: April 6, 1990
- Recorded: February 15, 1990
- Genre: Country
- Length: 3:07
- Label: MCA 79015
- Songwriter: Aaron Barker
- Producers: Jimmy Bowen; George Strait

George Strait singles chronology
"Overnight Success" (1989)	"Love Without End, Amen" (1990)	"Drinking Champagne" (1990)

"Love Without End, Amen" is a song written by Aaron Barker, and recorded by American country music singer George Strait. It was released in April 1990 as the lead-off single from the album Livin' It Up and became Strait's biggest hit ever.

The song spent five weeks at Number One on the Billboard Hot Country Singles & Tracks (now Hot Country Songs) chart. It was the first five-week chart topper since Dolly Parton's "Here You Come Again" in late 1977. "Love Without End, Amen" was Strait's first multi-week No. 1 single, as each of his previous 18 Number Ones had only spent one week at the top.

"Love Without End, Amen" was released in the UK in January 1991 and reached Number 129.

== Content ==
The song is a mid-tempo tune whose singer recalls being sent home one day from school for fighting when he was a child, and he tells his father what had happened, expecting punishment from his father. Instead his father tells him that fathers always love their children, and that such love is a "love without end, Amen."

In the second verse, the singer has now become a father, and he had no doubt that his son was "just like (his) father's son", and he passes his father's secret on to his son.

In the third and final verse, the singer dreams that he has died and is standing outside the gates of Heaven. When he has doubts if he will enter or not due to bad choices he has made in his life, a Voice from the "Other Side" reiterates the words His Father once said to Him, illustrating the ultimate "Love Without End".

== Chart positions ==
Chart (1990)	Peak position
Canada Country Singles (RPM)	1
US Hot Country Songs (Billboard)	1

=== Year-end charts ===
Chart (1990)	Position
Canada Country Tracks (RPM)	6
US Country Songs (Billboard)	4

== Certifications ==
Certifications for Love Without End, Amen
Region	Certification	Certified units/sales
United States (RIAA)	Platinum	1,000,000^{‡}
^{‡} Sales+streaming figures based on certification alone.
