= George Strait =

American country music singer (born 1952)

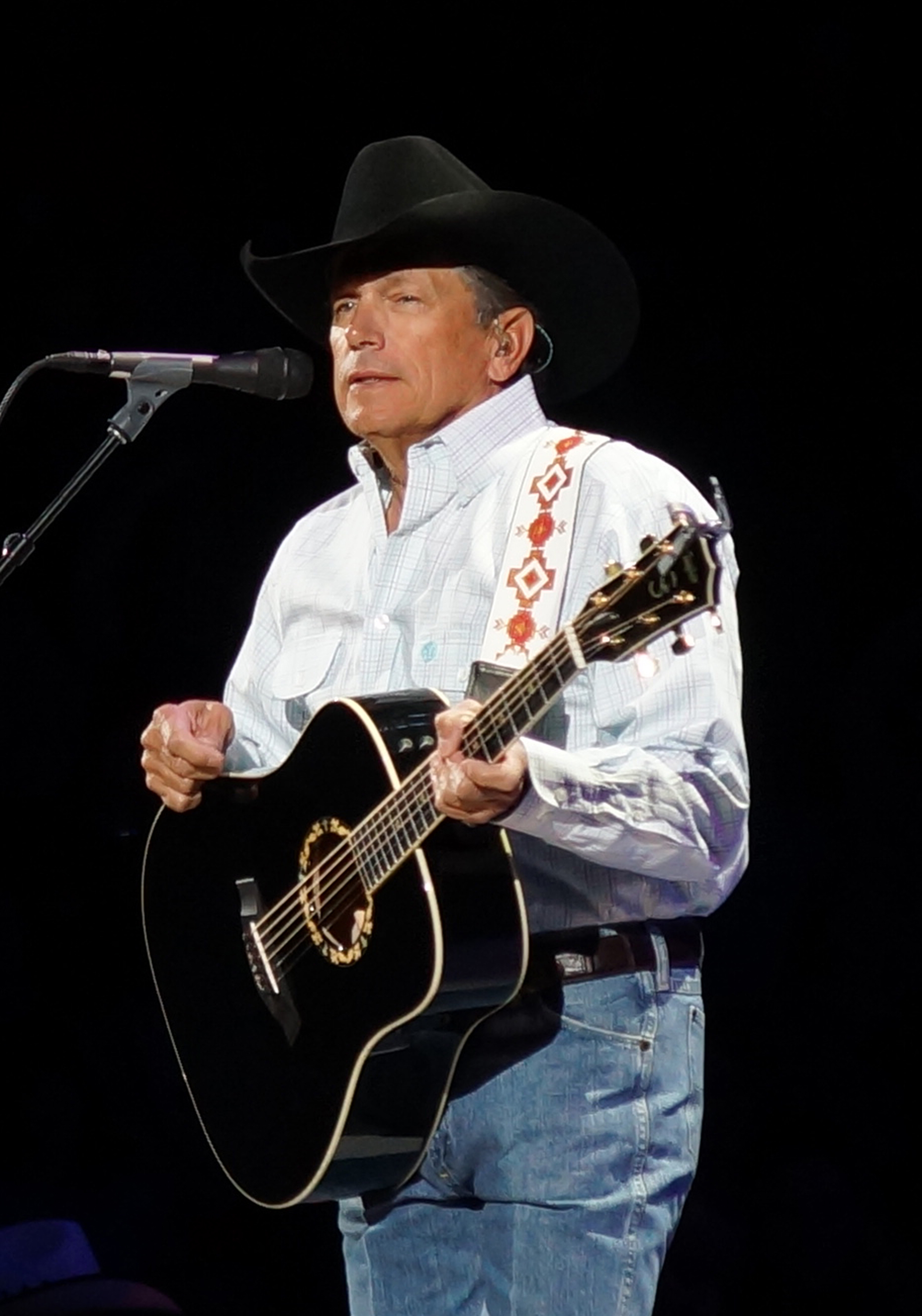
- Strait in 2014

Background information
- Born: George Harvey Strait; May 18, 1952 (age 74); Poteet, Texas, U.S.
- Origin: Pearsall, Texas
- Genres: Neotraditional country; Texas country; Western swing; honky-tonk
- Occupations: Singer; songwriter; actor; record producer; rancher
- Instruments: Vocals; guitar
- Works: Albums; singles
- Years active: 1976–present
- Labels: D Records; MCA (MCA Nashville)
- Member of: Ace in the Hole Band
- Spouse: Norma Strait (m. 1971)
- Website: georgestrait.com
- Military career
- Allegiance: United States
- Branch: United States Army
- Service years: 1971–1975
- Rank: Corporal
- Units: 25th Infantry Division, Schofield Barracks

George Harvey Strait Sr. (born May 18, 1952) is an American country music singer, songwriter, actor, music producer, and rancher. Strait has sold tens of millions of records worldwide, making him one of the best-selling music artists of all time.

Strait holds the RIAA record for most certified albums by any artist, with 33 albums that are certified platinum or gold. Considering singles and albums, he has a total of 20 multi-platinum, 33 platinum and 24 gold certifications. According to the RIAA, Strait is the 12th best-selling album recording artist in the United States overall selling over 70 million records across the United States.

He is credited for pioneering the neotraditional country style in the 1980s, famed for his authentic cowboy image and roots-oriented sound at a time when the Nashville music industry was dominated by country pop crossover acts. Given his influence on the genre, Strait has been nicknamed the "King of Country Music" by writers and music critics. He currently holds the record for the most (60) number one songs on all charts by an artist, in any genre of music, including a record 44 on the Billboard Hot Country Songs chart. He has been nominated for 16 Grammy Awards, winning his first and only award for Best Country Album in 2009 with his album Troubadour.

Strait's career in country music began performing with his band Ace in the Hole in Texas honky-tonks in the 1970s, recording tracks for the Houston-based independent record label D Records. While working on ranches across Texas in his 20s during the day, Strait performed with the Ace in the Hole during nights and the weekend. By the late 1970s, Strait caught the interest of former MCA Records executive Erv Woosley, who became Strait's longtime manager and helped him with signing to MCA Records.

Strait's commercial success began when his first major label single "Unwound" was a minor hit in 1981 and scored his first number one country radio hit with "Fool Hearted Memory" in 1982, introducing the neotraditional country style to the mainstream. During the 1980s, seven of his albums reached number one on the country charts. In the 2000s, he was named Artist of the Decade by the Academy of Country Music, elected into the Country Music Hall of Fame, and won his first Grammy award. Strait was named CMA Entertainer of the Year in 1989, 1990 and 2013, and ACM Entertainer of the Year in 1990 and 2014. He has been nominated for more CMA and ACM awards and has more wins in both categories than any other artist.

Strait became known for his touring career after he designed a 360-degree configuration and introduced festival style tours. His final concert for The Cowboy Rides Away Tour at AT&T Stadium in 2014 drew 104,793 people, setting a new record for the largest indoor concert in North America. In mid-2024, Strait set the record for the largest ticketed concert for a single act in U.S. history, with over 110,905 people at Kyle Field in College Station, Texas. He additionally was inducted into the Hollywood Walk of Fame in the same year for its class of 2025.

== Early life ==
George Harvey Strait was born on May 18, 1952, in Poteet, Texas, to John Byron Strait Sr. (January 11, 1922 – June 4, 2013), and Doris Jean Couser (June 26, 1930 – January 30, 2010). He is a second cousin of Jackie Bezos, mother of billionaire businessman Jeff Bezos.

He grew up in nearby Pearsall, in Frio County, where his father was a junior high school mathematics teacher and the owner of a 2,000-acre (810 ha) cattle ranch outside of Big Wells, Texas. The family worked at the ranch on the weekends and in the summers. When George was in the fourth grade, his father and mother were divorced, and his mother moved away with his sister, Pency. George and his brother John "Buddy" Jr. (1950–2009) grew up with their father. For most of his early life, George was in ranching alongside his older brother Buddy and his father John.

Strait began his musical career while attending Pearsall High School, where he performed in a rock and roll garage band, known as the Stoics, taking most of their influence and inspiration from the Beatles and other British Invasion-era rock groups. "The Beatles were big," Strait confirmed. "I listened to them a lot and that whole bunch of groups that were popular then." He performed in other rock bands during his high school tenure. His musical preference soon turned to country with singers Hank Thompson, Lefty Frizzell, Merle Haggard, George Jones, Bob Wills, Hank Williams, and Frank Sinatra influencing his style. Strait did not tune in to and listen to country music radio often as a youth, usually selecting the news and the farmer's report instead. His introduction to country music came mostly by way of live performances, which according to Strait could be heard in every town in Texas.

== Marriage and military service ==
He eloped with his high school sweetheart, Norma Voss after their high school graduation. The couple initially married in Mexico on December 4, 1971. In the same year, he enlisted in the United States Army as a finance clerk. While stationed at Schofield Barracks adjacent to Wahiawa, Hawaii, as part of the 25th Infantry Division, George auditioned and began performing with an Army-sponsored country music band, Rambling Country, which also played off-base under the name Santee. On October 6, 1972, while still in Hawaii, George and Norma had their first child, Jenifer. He served in the United States Army from 1971 to 1975 and ultimately attained the rank of corporal.

== Higher education ==
After George Strait was honorably discharged from the Army in 1975, he enrolled at Southwest Texas State University (now Texas State University) in San Marcos. He graduated with a degree in agriculture. He was also presented an honorary doctoral degree by his alma mater, Texas State University in San Marcos, in a private ceremony on May 26, 2006. Strait is a loyal alumnus of the college; in 1985 he established an endowment fund for the development and operation of the Freeman Ranch for agricultural purposes, land and wildlife management, and gifts of scholarships.

== Music career ==
=== 1970s ===
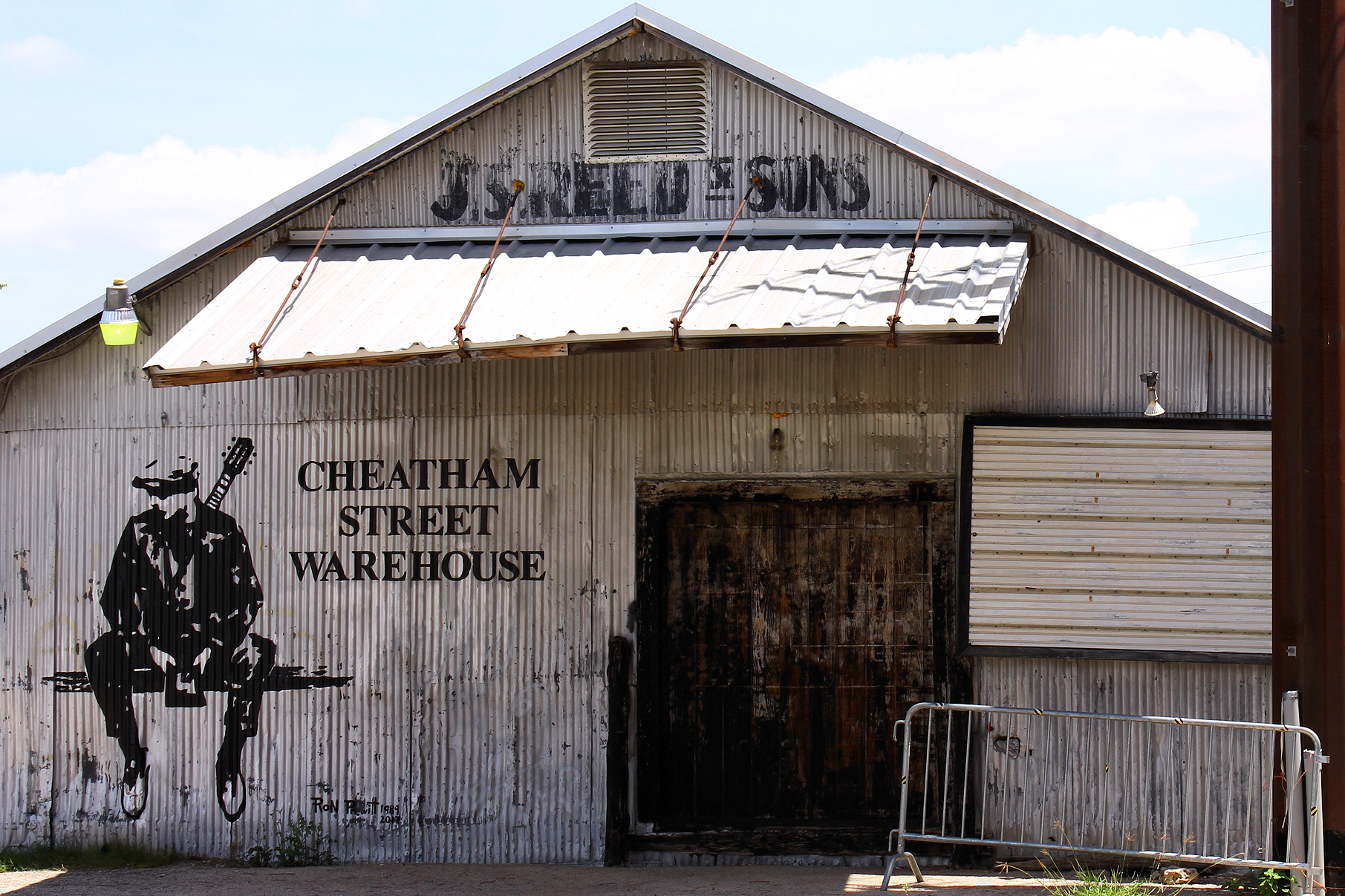
George Strait had his first performance at Cheatham Street Warehouse in San Marcos, Texas on October 13, 1975.

During his college years, Strait joined the country band Stoney Ridge, answering a flyer the band posted around campus looking for a new lead vocalist. Strait renamed the group the Ace in the Hole Band, and quickly became the lead; they began to perform at honky-tonks and bars around south and central Texas, traveling as far east as Huntsville and Houston. They gained a regional following and opened for national acts such as the Texas Playboys and Asleep at the Wheel. Soon his band was given the opportunity to record several Strait-penned singles, including "That Don't Change The Way I Feel About You" and "I Can't Go On Dying Like This" for the Houston-based D Records independent label. However, the songs never achieved wide recognition, and Strait continued to manage his family cattle ranch during the day to make some extra cash.

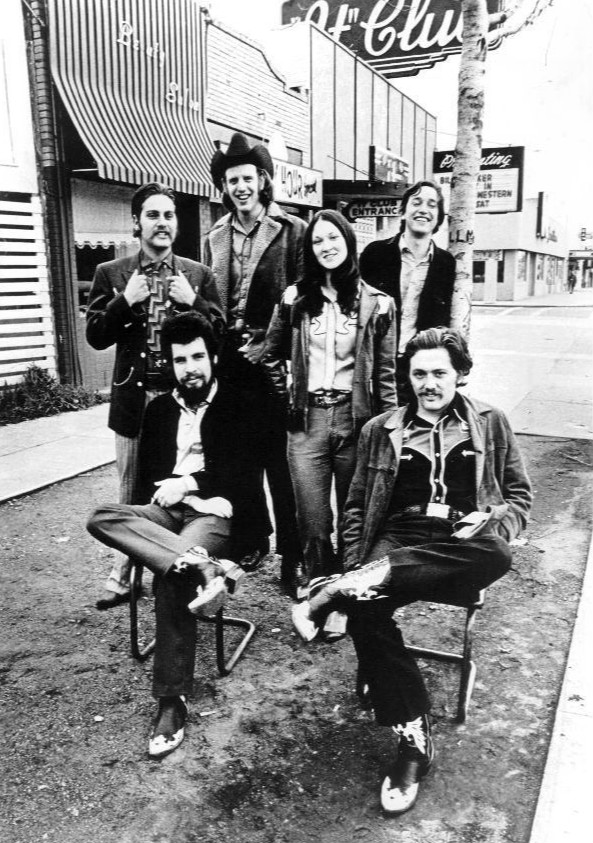
Western swing band Asleep at the Wheel, pictured here in 1976, featured George Strait as an opening act during his early years performing in the 1970s. Asleep at the Wheel has in return, been an opening act for Strait in later years.

While he continued to play with his band, without any real connections to the recording industry, Strait became friends with Erv Woolsey, who operated one of the bars in which the Ace in the Hole band played and who had previously worked for the major label MCA Records. Woolsey convinced some of his Music Row (Nashville) connections to come to Texas and to listen to Strait and his band play. Impressed with the performance but concerned that they could not market the Western swing sound that the band featured, they left without offering a deal.

After several unsuccessful trips to Nashville with Kent Finlay, owner of the Cheatham Street Warehouse, in search of a major label record deal in which Strait was turned down by every label in town, he considered giving up music altogether. He was offered a job designing cattle pens and decided to take it. He gave the band notice that he was leaving, but after a discussion with his wife, she convinced him to give pursuing music one more year. Not long afterward, a major label, MCA, signed Strait to a recording contract in February 1981. The initial deal was for one song. If the single did well, the label would consider doing an album. The Ace in the Hole band remained with Strait, performing as the backup and touring band for the now solo career of Strait.

=== 1980s ===
In the spring of 1981, Strait released his first single for MCA Records, titled "Unwound", which climbed to number six on the Billboard Hot Country Songs chart that year and was included on his debut album Strait Country. The record featured two other singles including "Down and Out", a number 16 hit for Strait, and "If You're Thinking You Want a Stranger (There's One Coming Home)".

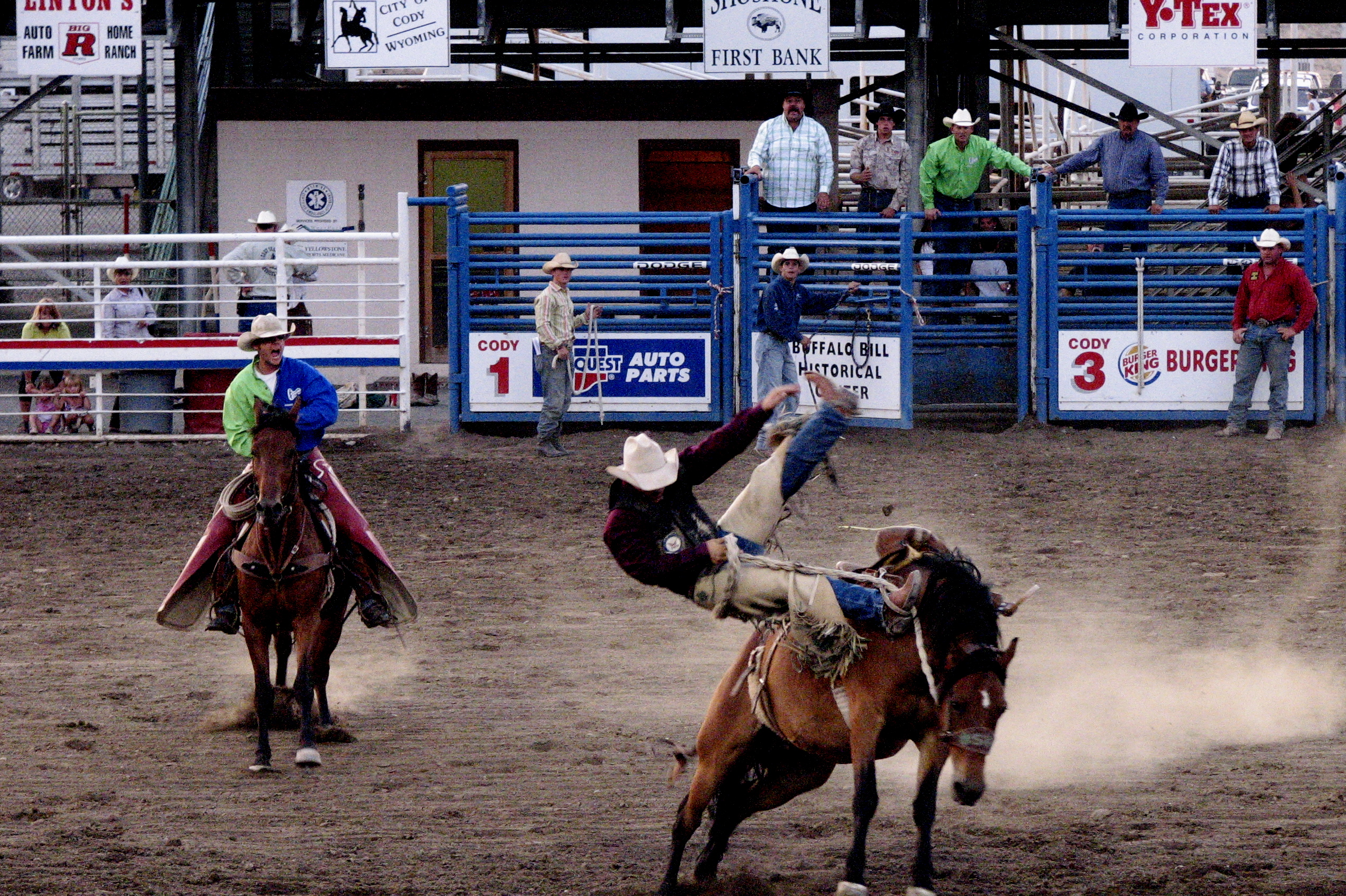
"Amarillo by Morning," which tells the story of a Texas rodeo cowboy, was originally recorded and written by Terry Stafford in 1973. In 1982, Strait recorded the song with a more Western-based instrumentation. The song has become a signature song associated with Strait; it has been referred as one of the greatest country songs of all time.

Strait Country was hailed by critics as being a "new-traditionalist" breakthrough that broke the trend of pop-influenced country prevalent at the time. The critically acclaimed Strait from the Heart, his second album, was released in 1982 and featured the first number-one single of his career, "Fool Hearted Memory" and the top-five Western ballad "Amarillo by Morning" which was originally sung and written by Terry Stafford in 1973. It later became one of Strait's signature songs. In 1983, Strait made his first appearance at the Houston Livestock Show and Rodeo, when the headlining star, Eddie Rabbitt became sick with the flu. Performing at that rodeo has since become a mainstay throughout his career. He has made more than 20 appearances at the rodeo and played for more than one million fans.

Strait recorded 17 number ones during the decade, including a string of five that lasted from 1983 to 1984 from his next two albums Right or Wrong, his first number-one album and the CMA award-winning Does Fort Worth Ever Cross Your Mind. The next year, he won the CMA award for top male vocalist, and released his first greatest hits compilation, which featured songs from his first three albums. Also in 1985, Strait released Something Special, the third-straight number-one album of his career, featuring the number-one single "The Chair". In 1986, Strait repeated as the CMA vocalist of the year and released his fourth number-one album #7.

Strait and his family were struck with tragedy when his 13-year-old daughter, Jenifer, was killed in a one-car, alcohol-unrelated accident in 1986. She was riding in a Ford Mustang driven by Gregory Wilson Allen, 18, of Staples, Texas. Allen was charged with a class A misdemeanor for vehicular homicide. Mike Cox, spokesman for the Texas Department of Public Safety in Austin, said, "The responding trooper determined the cause of accident to be excessive speed and that the car did not negotiate the turn properly. Jenifer was riding in the front passenger seat, and none of the four occupants was wearing seat belts at the time. When the vehicle flipped over onto its passenger's side, Jenifer was partially ejected, killing her on impact. The incident caused George to greatly limit his contact with the media. He stopped doing interviews for many years after the accident; he and his family did not wish to discuss Jenifer's death.

George Strait's grief did not hinder his performance, however, or his output; as he released 11 straight number-one hits, starting with "Nobody in His Right Mind Would've Left Her" in 1986 and ending with "Ace in the Hole" in 1989. The singles spanned four albums including #7, Ocean Front Property in 1987, If You Ain't Lovin' You Ain't Livin' in 1988, and 1989's Beyond the Blue Neon, all of which reached the number one spot on country album charts. Ocean Front Property was the first country album to ever debut at number one on the charts by any artist. The streak included such songs as "Ocean Front Property", "All My Ex's Live in Texas", "Famous Last Words of a Fool", and "Baby Blue". Strait finished the decade by winning the CMA Entertainer of the Year award in 1989. One year later, he won the award again.

=== 1990s ===
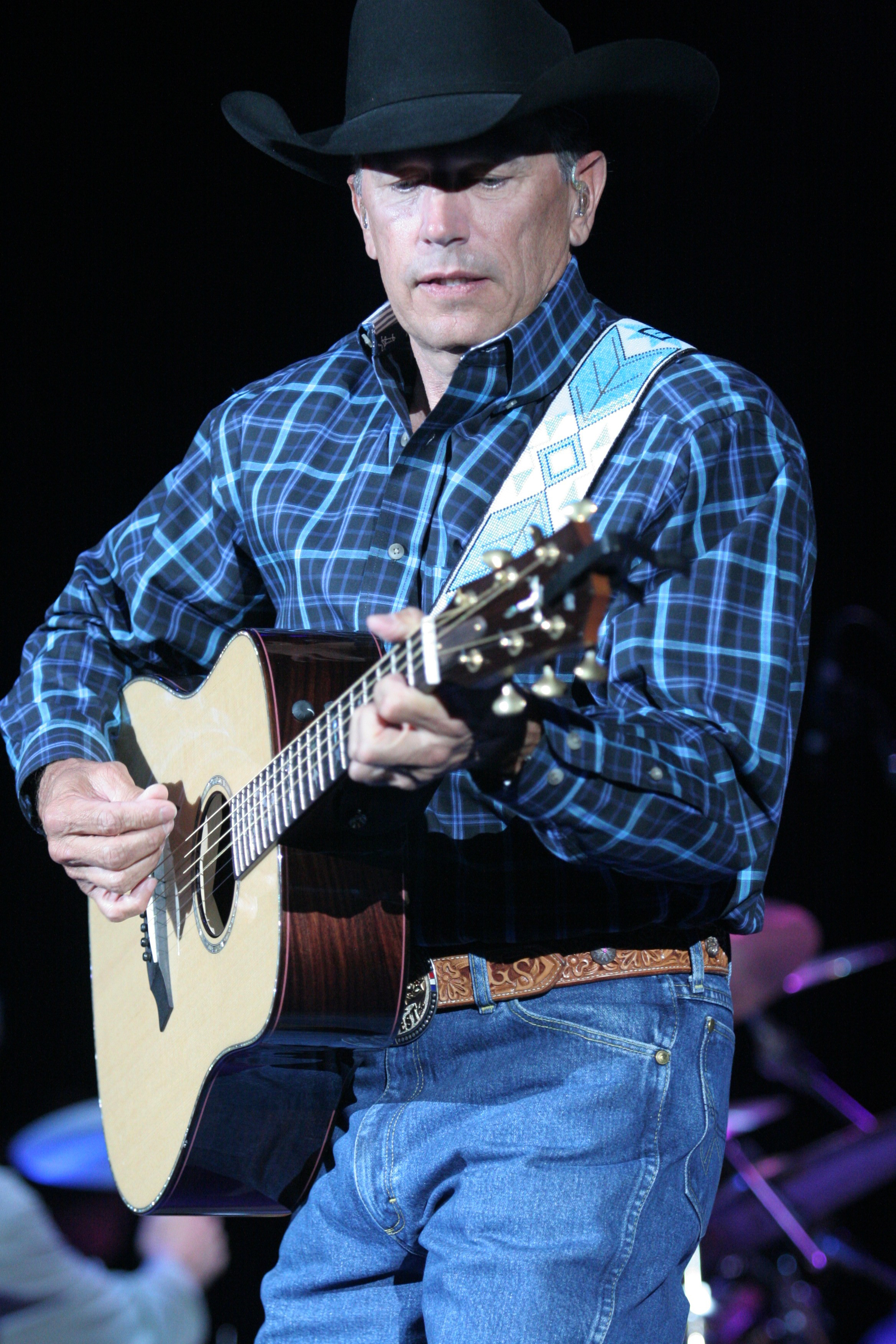
Strait performing live at the 1st Mariner Arena, Baltimore, Maryland on April 7, 2008

Strait began the decade with the release of his tenth studio album, Livin' It Up, which featured two number-one hits, including "Love Without End, Amen", his first multiweek hit, and "I've Come to Expect It From You". Both songs remained first for five weeks in 1990. Chill of an Early Fall shortly followed in 1991, and received positive reviews. Entertainment Weekly noted that the album marked a shift for Strait from "repeating himself" in his previous works to producing different material. It produced the number-one songs "If I Know Me" and "You Know Me Better Than That", but ended his streak of 31 straight top-ten hits with the cover of "Lovesick Blues", which peaked at number 24. The record blocked his run of eight top-charting albums with its peak of number four. In the spring of 1992, Holding My Own was released. It did not produce any number ones, but did include two top-five songs, including "So Much Like My Dad".

Later in 1992, Strait played the main character in the film Pure Country, and released the film's soundtrack. It was his most successful studio album, producing such hits as "Heartland", "I Cross My Heart", and "When Did You Stop Loving Me", and peaked at number one and number six respectively on the Country and Billboard 200 album charts. The success continued with his next album, Easy Come, Easy Go in 1993, which reached the top five on the Billboard 200 and featured the hits "I'd Like to Have That One Back", "The Man in Love with You", and the number-one title track.

His next four albums, including Lead On in 1994, Blue Clear Sky in 1996, Carrying Your Love with Me in 1997, and 1998's One Step at a Time, all charted at number one, with Blue Clear Sky claiming the spot on its debut week, and Carrying Your Love with Me peaking at number one on the Billboard 200 for the first time in Strait's career. This series of albums produced eight number-one singles for Strait, including "You Can't Make a Heart Love Somebody", "Carried Away", "One Night at a Time", and "I Just Want to Dance with You".

During this period, Strait also released a four-disc, box-set career retrospective, Strait Out of the Box, in 1995, which also included two new songs, the top five hit "I Know She Still Loves Me" and the No.1 hit "Check Yes or No". It became the second-best selling box set ever with shipments of eight million in the United States. He was named as the CMA's Top Male Vocalist in 1997 and 1998. Starting in 1997, and continuing until 2001, Strait headlined the George Strait Country Music Festival, which included artists such as Tim McGraw, Faith Hill, Kenny Chesney, Alan Jackson, and others.

In an effort to introduce these acts to as many fans as possible, the festival promised not to visit any market more than twice. It played only a small number of dates, usually no more than 20 a year, but still managed to be the ninth-biggest grossing tour of 1998.

Strait completed the decade with the album Always Never the Same in 1999, which peaked at number two on country charts and matched the cross-over success of Pure Country by reaching number six on the Billboard 200. The record produced the hits "What Do You Say to That", "Meanwhile", and the number-one "Write This Down". Reviews of the album's material were generally mixed, but Entertainment Weekly observed that at this point in his career, Strait could record the "most lightweight" material and "make it soar" on the radio with his "grace". All in all, Strait scored 17 number-one hits on the Billboard country airplay charts in the decade, and carried his successes into the next century.

=== 2000s ===
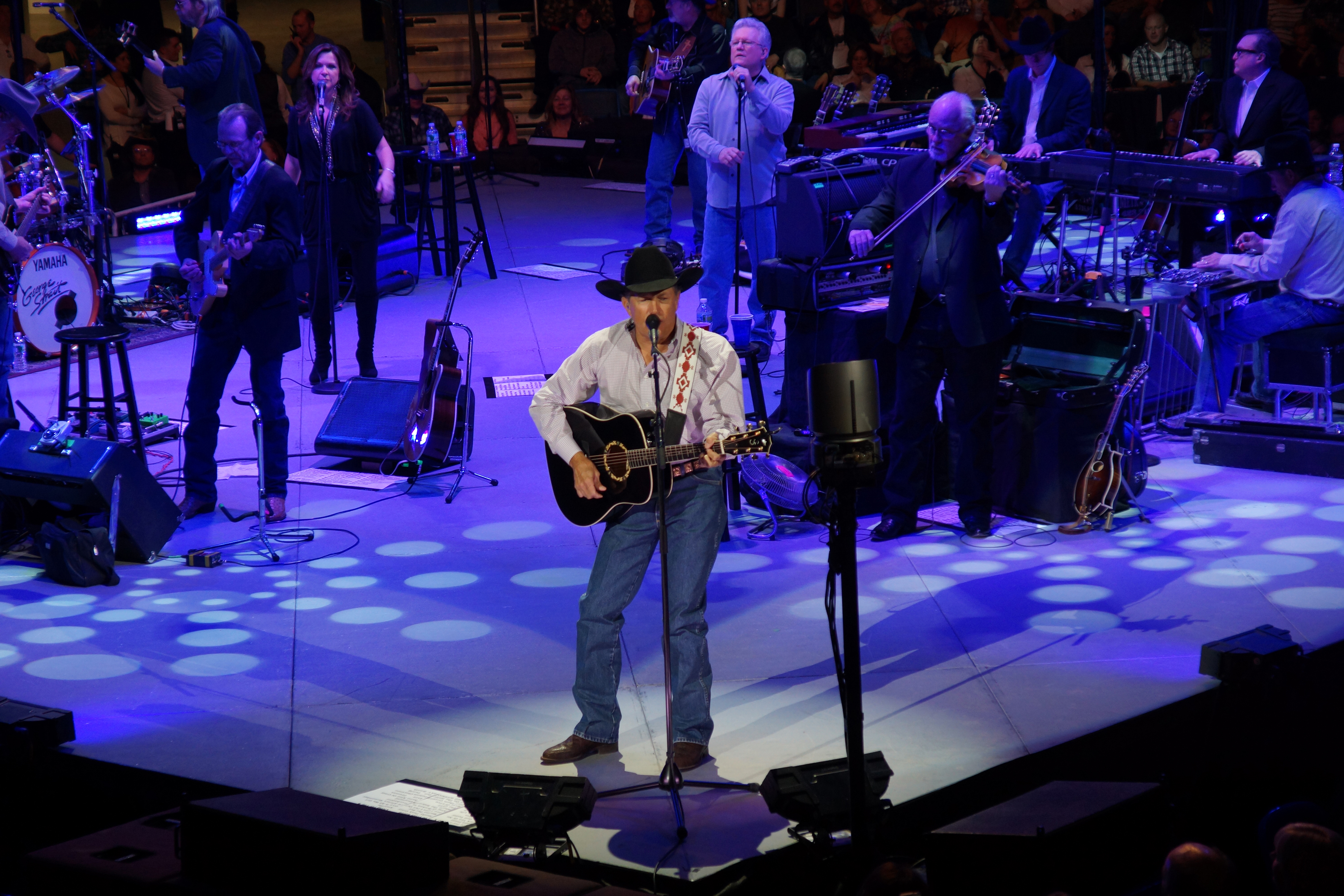
Strait on the Cowboy Rides Away Tour, XL Center, Hartford, Connecticut, February 23, 2013

Strait released a self-titled album in 2000, which despite a number-one and number-seven showing on the country and Billboard 200 album charts, respectively, produced no number-one singles, and was the first studio album of his career to not be certified platinum. The singles "Go On" and "If You Can Do Anything Else" were released from the record, with both peaking in the top five. In May 2001, The Road Less Traveled was released. Reviews for the album were mostly positive; Rolling Stone described it as sticking to the formula, "but adds a few twists that make it superior to his last few releases." It featured "vocal processing", and was considered by some critics as an experimental album. Three singles were released from it, two of which reached number one, including "She'll Leave You with a Smile", his 50th on combined charts and "Living and Living Well", both of which reached the top 30 of Billboard Hot 100, with the former peaking at number 23, Strait's highest rank on the chart. The single "Run" peaked at number two and reached number 34 on the Billboard 100. Strait released two records in 2003. For the Last Time: Live from the Astrodome was a recording of the last Houston Livestock Show and Rodeo to take place in the Astrodome. The performance itself set the record for paid attendance at the venue, with 68,266 people, breaking Latin superstar Selena's previous record of about 67,000 in 1995.

His next album, Honkytonkville was described as "a fiery set of hard country", and was praised "for its mixture of the old Strait with his modern, superstar self." It did not produce any number ones for Strait, but included the hits "Cowboys Like Us" and a cover of Bruce Robison's "Desperately". His 2004 performance at Reliant Stadium set a new rodeo attendance record, with 68,679 spectators. That year, he issued a greatest hits package billed as 50 Number Ones, chronicling the number-one hits of his career from all charts, starting with "Fool Hearted Memory" and ending with "She'll Leave You With a Smile." A new track, "I Hate Everything", was also included, and became his 51st overall number one in 2004.

The next year, Somewhere Down in Texas arrived, which produced the hit "You'll Be There", marking Strait's first appearance on the adult contemporary chart. The next year, he embarked on a tour that included only 18 performances, but grossed over $15 million. He attributed this success to the fact that his band and he are "musically very tight", have a large pool of songs to draw from, and perform those songs very similarly to how they sound on their albums.

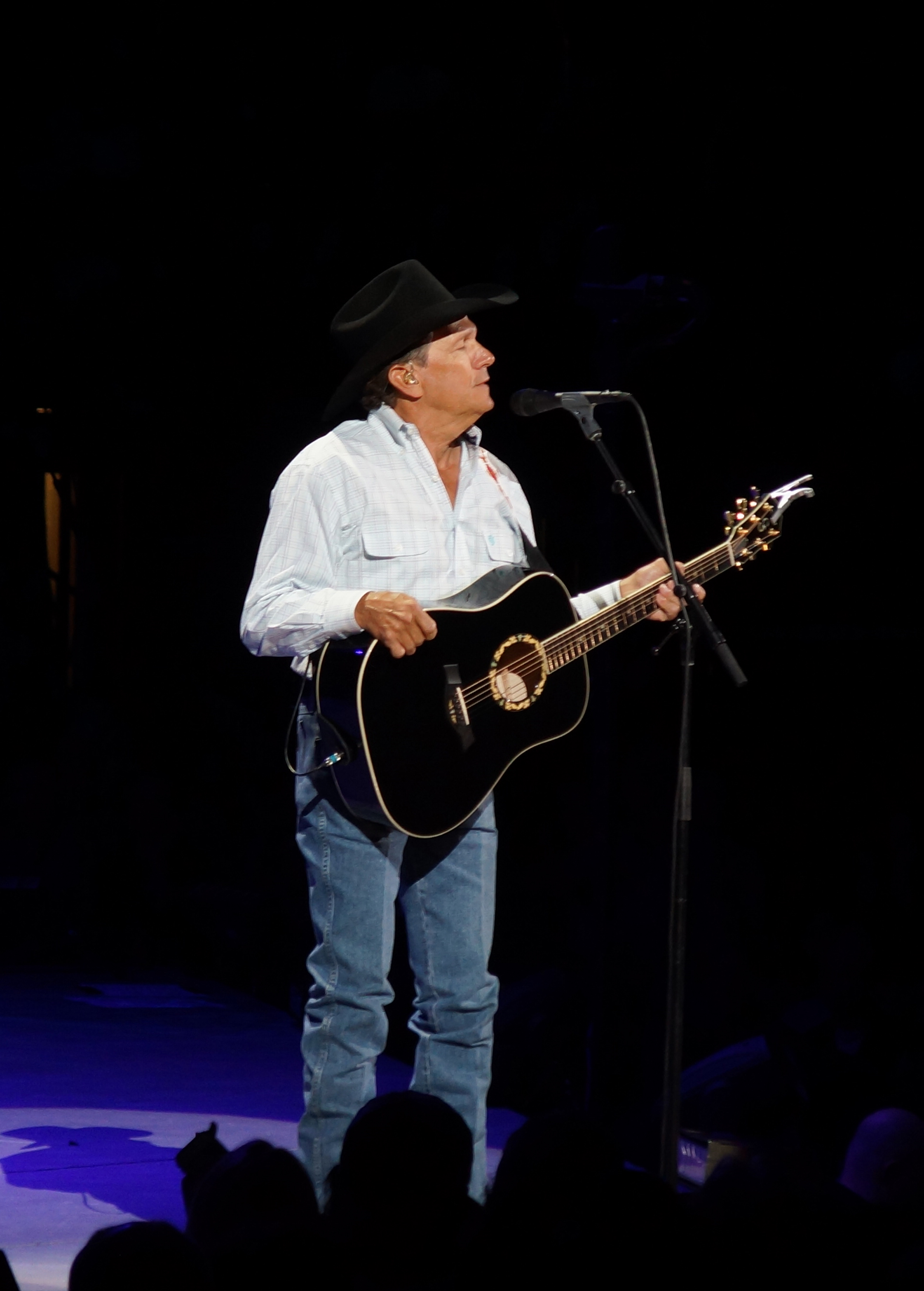
Strait on the Cowboy Rides Away Tour, XL Center, Hartford, Connecticut, February 23, 2013

On October 3, 2006, Strait marked his 30th year in the music industry with the release of a new album titled It Just Comes Natural. The album was recorded in Key West, Florida, in Jimmy Buffett's Shrimp Boat Sound Studio (said to be a better recording location due to lack of allergy flare-ups during recording process), which was also the recording location of Troubadour. It featured 15 new songs. Strait's long-time friend and songwriter, Dean Dillon, co-wrote two of the songs on the album. It received generally positive reviews from critics. People, in their four-star review, remarked, "If ever there was a natural in country music, it's Strait," while USA Today raved that "he continues to make such consistent quality look easy". The first single from the album, "Give It Away" reached number one, making one of its co-writers, country legend "Whispering Bill" Anderson, the first songwriter to have a number-one hit in five different decades. The title track, "It Just Comes Natural" became his 42nd Billboard number one.

In 2007, "Wrapped" reached number one on the Mediabase 24/7 country music charts, giving Strait his 55th overall number-one single. From January through April of that year, Strait headlined a 23-date arena tour with country-music legend Ronnie Milsap and then-newcomer Taylor Swift. He released a new album titled Troubadour on April 1, 2008. The CD contained 12 tracks, including a duet with Patty Loveless and another with long-time songwriter Dean Dillon. The lead single from the album, "I Saw God Today", debuted at number 19 on the Radio and Records and Billboard charts. It is the highest debut ever for a single from Strait and the fourth-highest debut for a song in country-music history. Troubadour debuted at number one on the Billboard Top 200 album charts, selling over 160,000 copies in its first week of release. "River of Love", the third single from the album, became his 57th number-one song in 2009.

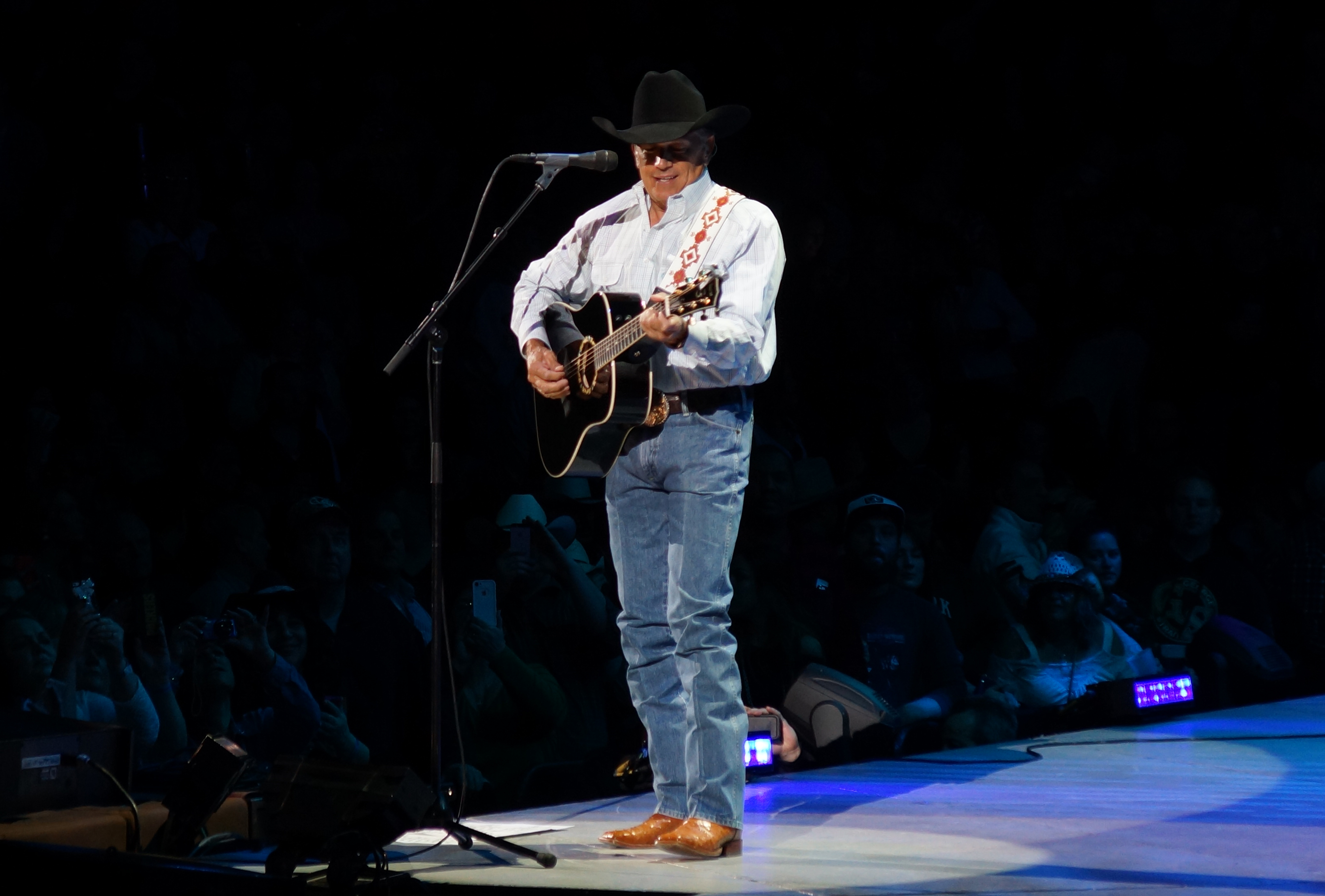
Strait on the Cowboy Rides Away Tour at the Prudential Center in Newark, New Jersey, March 1, 2014

In April 2009, Strait was honored by the Academy of Country Music with the Artist of the Decade Award, which was presented to Strait by the previous ACM Artist of the Decade, Garth Brooks. In June of that year, he headlined the first event at the new Dallas Cowboys Stadium in Arlington, Texas. Strait's single "Living for the Night" was released on May 28, 2009, and was written by Strait, his son Bubba, and Dean Dillon. The song was the lead single from his album Twang, released on August 11, 2009. Twang was certified gold for selling over 500,000 copies. By 2009, he broke Conway Twitty's previous record for the most number-one hits on Billboard's Hot Country Songs chart when his 44 number one singles surpassed Twitty's 40.

=== 2010s ===
In 2010, Billboard ranked Strait number one in the top-25 country artists of the past 25 years. On September 6, 2011, Strait released the album, Here for a Good Time, which yielded two number-one singles—"Here for a Good Time" and "Love's Gonna Make It Alright"—bringing Strait's number-one singles total to 59. The album's third single, "Drinkin' Man", was less successful, peaking at number 37.

In October 2012, Strait released the single "Give It All We Got Tonight", which was included on his album Love Is Everything, released on May 14, 2013. The song initiated a "60 for 60" movement by Strait's label, to make the song his 60th number-one single on all country charts while he was still 60 years old. The song reached the top of the Mediabase charts in May 2013. The album's next single, "I Believe", reached number 50 on the U.S. Country Airplay chart, making it Strait's first single to miss the top 40. Strait won the 2013 CMA Entertainer of the Year award.

In November 2013, Billboard presented Strait with its Legend of Live honor during the 10th annual Billboard Touring Awards ceremony. The award honors the concert industry's top artist based on Billboard's Boxscore chart and box-office performance. Strait is the first country artist to receive Billboard's highest touring accolade. On April 19, 2015, Strait made a guest appearance at the 2015 ACM Awards, he performed "All My Ex's Lives in Texas" and his new single "Let it Go".

In 2016, Strait was selected as one of 30 artists to perform on "Forever Country", for a mash-up track of "Take Me Home, Country Roads", "On the Road Again", and "I Will Always Love You", which celebrates 50 years of the CMA Awards.

In 2018, Strait released a single called "Codigo", after a brand of tequila produced by a company in which he had invested.

=== The Cowboy Rides Away Tour ===
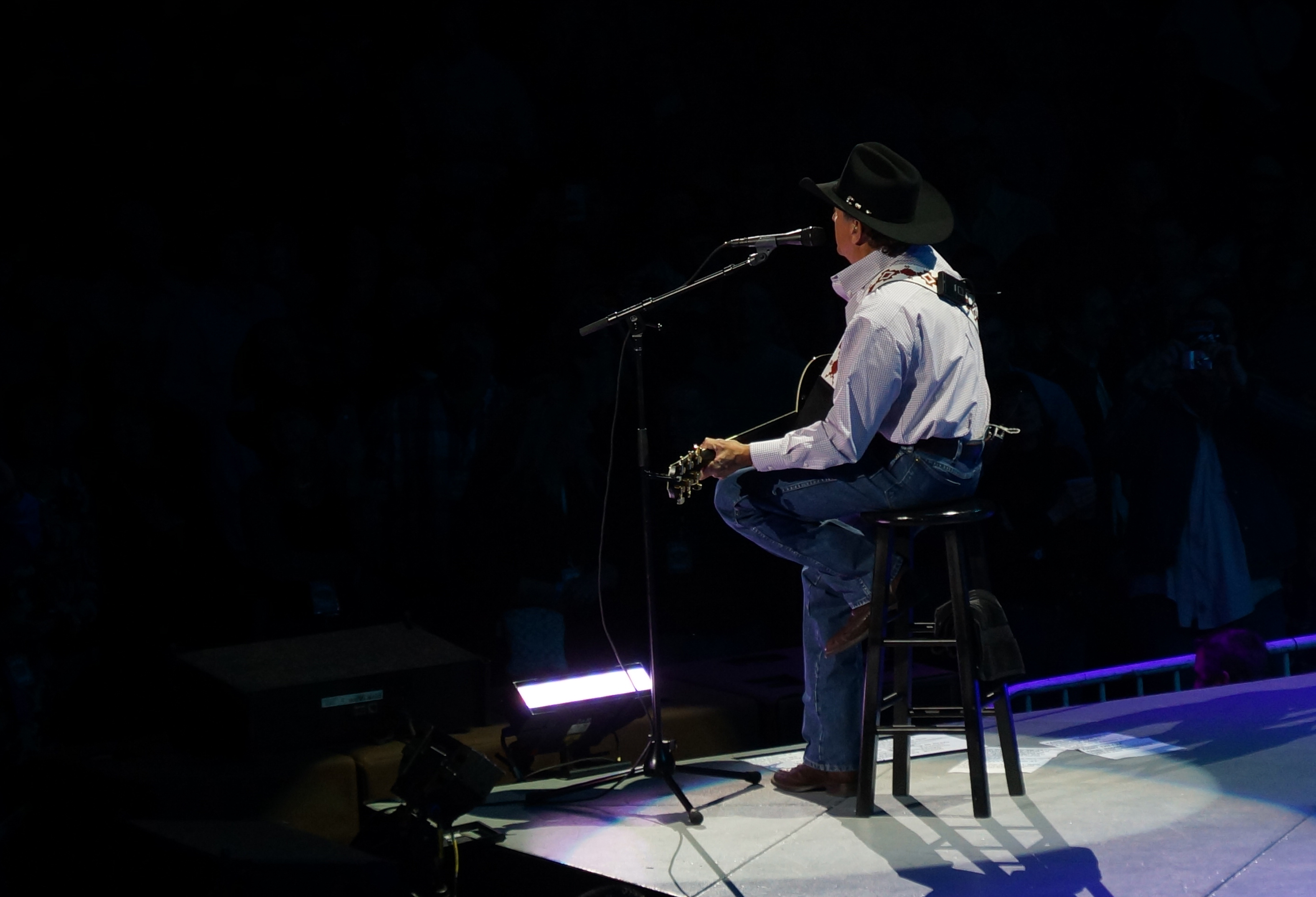
Strait on the Cowboy Rides Away Tour, XL Center, Hartford, Connecticut, February 23, 2013

On September 26, 2012, Strait announced that he was retiring from touring, and that his Cowboy Rides Away Tour would be his last. Tickets for both arenas and stadiums on the Cowboy Rides Away Tour sold out in a matter of hours. The tour started on January 18, 2013, in Lubbock, Texas, and was divided into two legs: 21 concerts in 2013 and 26 concerts in 2014. The tour ended in Arlington, Texas, on June 7, 2014. Strait was supported on the tour by his longtime 11-member touring group, the Ace in the Hole Band. For the 2013 leg, Martina McBride was the opening performer.

On January 9, 2014, Strait initiated the second leg of the tour, which featured the opening performers Jason Aldean, Eric Church, Martina McBride, Miranda Lambert, Little Big Town, Vince Gill, Lee Ann Womack, Merle Haggard, Chris Young, Ronnie Dunn, Luke Bryan, Tim McGraw, Kenny Chesney, Alan Jackson, and Asleep at the Wheel. Many of these performers gathered together for the tour's final concert in Arlington, Texas on June 7, before 104,793 fans – at the time both the largest attendance at a single-headliner concert in the United States, and the largest ticketed attendance ever at a concert in a stadium in the United States. Strait would then break both his own records ten years later, at Kyle Field in College Station, Texas. The concert also set a record for the largest gross at a single-show country concert, $18,194,374, and broke the 33-year-old record as well for "largest indoor concert ever," easily surpassing the 87,500 fans who attended the December 5, 1981, Rolling Stones concert at the New Orleans Superdome (opening acts, The Neville Brothers, followed by George Thorogood and the Destroyers).

A live album recorded from the final concert in Arlington titled The Cowboy Rides Away: Live from AT&T Stadium was released on September 16, 2014, with DVD/CDs of the concert being released on November 10, 2014, with Walmart exclusively releasing a deluxe edition including two CDs, as well. This deluxe DVD is the entire over three-hour concert and the accompanying two CDs have 28 of the 40 songs sung that night. On August 29, 2014, the Country Music Television channel broadcast a two-hour concert special of the event titled George Strait: The Cowboy Rides Away. This CMT concert special had 1 1/4 hours of music from the concert and interviews.

=== 2020s ===
Strait broke the record for most fans at a U.S. concert by a single headlining act on Saturday, June 15, 2024, with a concert at Kyle Field at Texas A&M University in College Station, Texas, with 110,905 fans in attendance. The record was previously held by The Grateful Dead, who had 107,019 fans in attendance at their 1977 show at Raceway Park in Old Bridge Township, New Jersey. The record was broken the following year by Zach Bryan, who recorded 112,408 tickets sold at Michigan Stadium in Ann Arbor. The show also set a new record for Texas A&M's Kyle Field for most fans at a single event. The previous record was on October 11, 2014, with 110,633 fans, for a Texas A&M football game against Ole Miss. On July 27, 2025 Strait organized an intimate relief concert in Boerne to aid in the relief efforts in central Texas communities affected by the July 2025 Central Texas floods. In total, the concert raised $6.25M.

== Musical style and influences ==
Strait's style of country music has been largely labeled as neotraditional country, which relies on traditional instrumentation in country music, i.e. fiddle and pedal steel guitar. His style has also been labeled as Texas country, Western swing, and honky-tonk.

== Legacy ==
George Strait has been cited as an influence by country artists such as Clint Black, Rick Trevino, Lee Ann Womack, Alan Jackson, Mark Chesnutt, Evan Felker of the Turnpike Troubadours, Parker McCollum, Charley Crockett, Zach Top, and Kacey Musgraves.

== Personal life ==
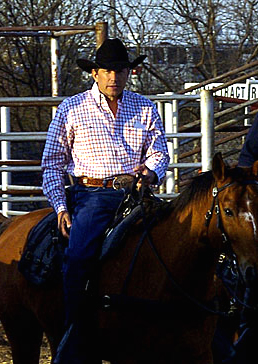
Strait at the San Antonio Stock Show & Rodeo in 2005

Strait eloped in Mexico with his high school sweetheart Norma in December 1971. Their first child, Jenifer, was born on October 6, 1972. Their son, George Harvey Strait Jr., known as "Bubba", was born in 1981.

Jenifer was killed in an automobile accident in San Marcos on June 25, 1986, at age 13. The family set up the Jenifer Lyn Strait Foundation, which donates money to children's charities in the San Antonio area. George Strait Jr., who is a graduate of Texas A&M, competed as a Professional Rodeo Cowboys Association team-roping competitor. Strait was able to watch his son compete at the Houston Livestock Show and Rodeo in 2006 shortly before taking the stage for his own performance.

On April 10, 2009, John Byron "Buddy" Strait, who was George's older brother, died at the age of 58.

Since 2010, Strait has served as spokesman for the Wrangler National Patriot program, a campaign designed to raise awareness and funds for America's wounded and fallen military veterans and their families. Strait says, "I've been a part of the Wrangler family for a long time... when they came to me with the idea for supporting fallen and wounded American veterans and their families, I knew I wanted to get involved." He also appeared in commercials for Tractor Supply Company.

In February 2012, Strait became a grandfather when George Strait Jr. and his wife Tamara had their first child, a son, George Harvey Strait III.

From 1983 through 2017, Strait hosted a prestigious, annual team-roping event; The George Strait Team Roping Classic. It was originally held in Kingsville, Texas, but then took place for several years at the San Antonio Rose Palace.

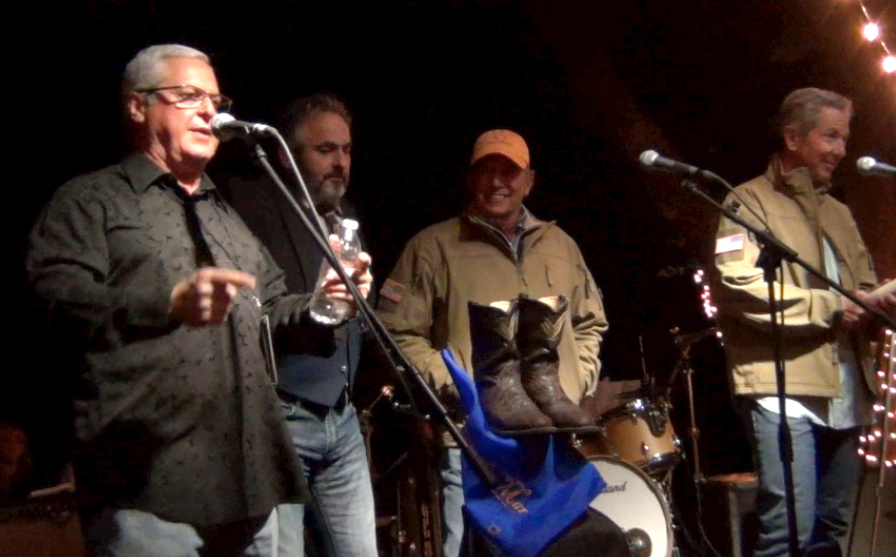
Vaqueros del Mar 5, George Strait auctions off his boots for the troops: George Strait (in orange cap), Tom Cusick, David Feherty

Strait owns a Gulfstream G450 business jet; its tail number is N518GS. His personal aircraft is housed at the Landmark Aviation facility in San Antonio. He teamed up with Texas Governor Greg Abbott to help with disaster relief efforts in the wake of Hurricane Harvey which devastated coastal areas of Texas.

Strait along with long-time friend and business partner Tom Cusick created the Vaqueros Del Mar (Cowboys of the Sea) Invitational Golf Tournament and Concert held annually at Strait and Cusick's Texas Hill Country resort Tapatio Springs Resort near Boerne, Texas. The Invitational raises money for David Feherty's Troops First Foundation, benefiting wounded servicemen, servicewomen and their families. Since its beginning in 2012, more than US$5 million have been raised by the events. In January 2018, George Strait was named the 2018 Texan of the Year by the Texas Legislative Conference, a statewide group of business and political leaders. Strait was honored for his fundraising efforts in the wake of the widespread flooding following Hurricane Harvey.

== Discography ==
In more than 30 years of recording, all of which have been spent with MCA Records, George Strait has garnered 60 number-one songs on all country charts (including Mediabase 24/7, the former Radio & Records chart, and the now-defunct Gavin Report chart), and has more number-one hits than any other artist in a single genre. His 44 Billboard country number-one hits are a record, four more than Conway Twitty's total that includes several duets with Loretta Lynn. Additionally, Strait is also the first artist in the history of Billboard to have at least one single enter the top 10 of a Billboard chart for 30 consecutive years, starting in 1981 when his debut single "Unwound" peaked at number six on the Hot Country Singles chart. All of his top-10 singles have been on that chart. Strait has sold more than 70 million records in the United States alone, and his certifications from the RIAA include 13 multiplatinum, 33 platinum, and 38 gold albums.

- Strait Country (1981)
- Strait from the Heart (1982)
- Right or Wrong (1983)
- Does Fort Worth Ever Cross Your Mind (1984)
- Something Special (1985)
- #7 (1986)
- Ocean Front Property (1987)
- If You Ain't Lovin' You Ain't Livin' (1988)
- Beyond the Blue Neon (1989)
- Livin' It Up (1990)
- Chill of an Early Fall (1991)
- Holding My Own (1992)
- Pure Country (1992)
- Easy Come Easy Go (1993)
- Lead On (1994)
- Blue Clear Sky (1996)
- Carrying Your Love with Me (1997)
- One Step at a Time (1998)
- Always Never the Same (1999)
- George Strait (2000)
- The Road Less Traveled (2001)
- Honkytonkville (2003)
- Somewhere Down in Texas (2005)
- It Just Comes Natural (2006)
- Troubadour (2008)
- Twang (2009)
- Here for a Good Time (2011)
- Love Is Everything (2013)
- Cold Beer Conversation (2015)
- Honky Tonk Time Machine (2019)
- Cowboys and Dreamers (2024)

== Filmography ==
Strait has acted in several films. He had a bit part in The Soldier (1982) and starred in Pure Country (1992). He also appeared as himself in Grand Champion (2002).

The film Pure Country featured George Strait in the lead role as Dusty Chandler, a famous country singer who strays too far from his country roots and traditional sound. It provided the opportunity for Strait to branch out from his own traditional country sound for a more rock-and-roll approach. The film had little success at the box office and took in only $15 million, but the soundtrack also called Pure Country, produced several hit singles for Strait. It has become his best-selling album to date. Strait had a limited role in the sequel to Pure Country, Pure Country 2: The Gift.

Year	Title	Role
1982	The Soldier	Himself
1992	Pure Country	Wyatt "Dusty" Chandler
2002	Grand Champion	Himself
2003	King of the Hill	Voice of Cornell
2010	Pure Country 2: The Gift	Himself

== Honors and awards ==
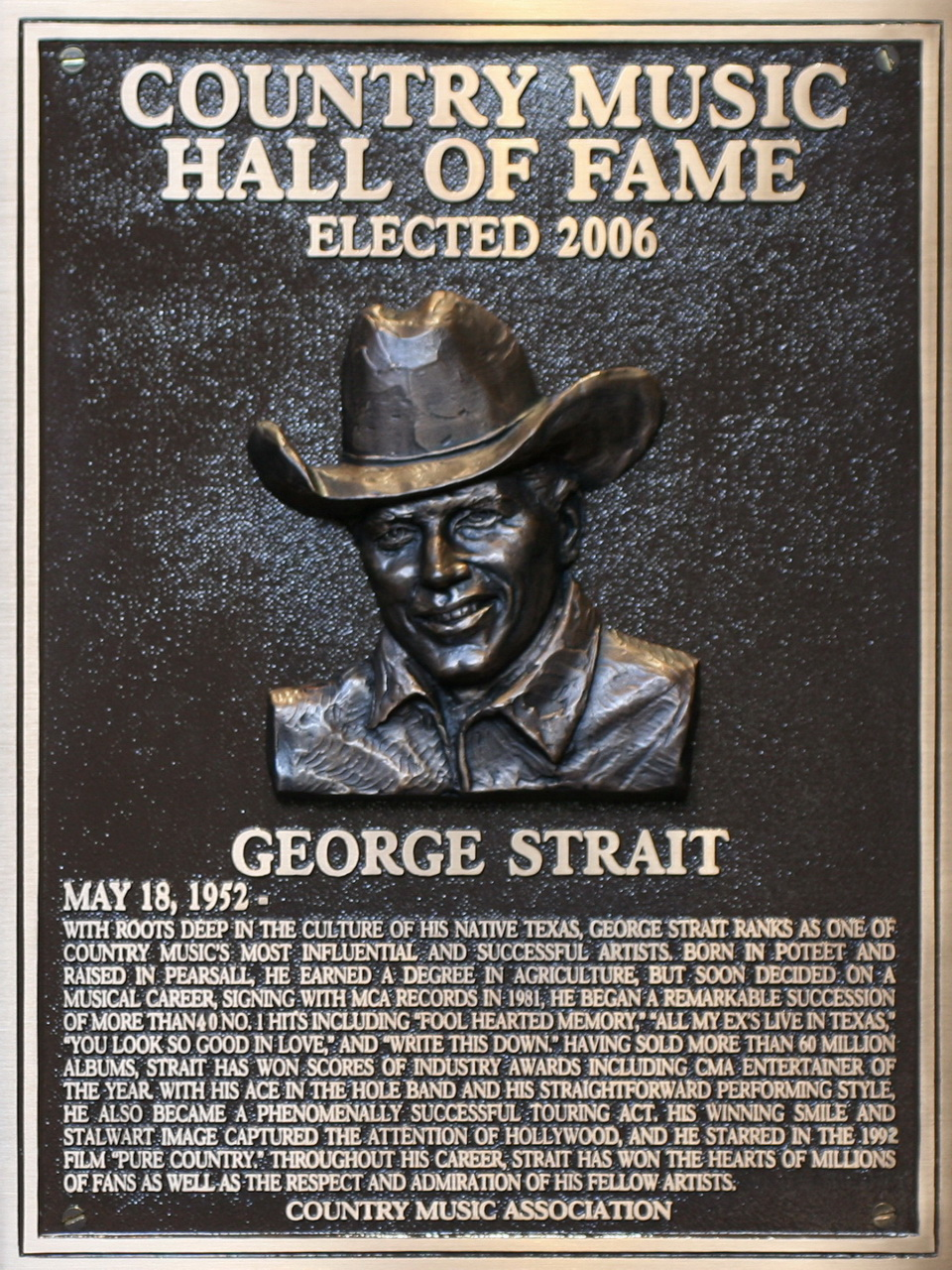
George Strait Country Music Hall of Fame plaque

Given his influence on the genre, Strait has been dubbed the "King of Country Music" by writers and music critics.

Strait holds the record for most number-one albums and singles, gold albums, platinum albums, and multiplatinum albums in the history of country music, and is 11th in the most number-one albums in all other genres. Strait is third only to Elvis Presley and The Beatles with the most gold and platinum albums in the history of music. Strait has been certified as the 12th-best selling artist in American history, with career record sales of 70 million in the United States.

Strait has held the world record for most number one hit singles across all charts and genres with 60 number-one hits since 2013, and is the only artist in the history of music of any kind to have a top-10 hit every year for 30 years. He is also second all-time in top-10 hits in the history of music, currently five away from breaking the all-time record held by Eddy Arnold, who had 92 in his historic career. Strait has won 22 CMA Awards, including consecutive Entertainer of the Year honors in 1989 and 1990, and also just recently won that same honor in 2013 (and is the only artist to win the top honor in three different decades) and holds the career record for CMA nominations (as a whole) and the most consecutively of all time.

As of 2009, he holds the record for the most CMA awards. Strait also holds those same records for wins and nominations for the Academy of Country Music Awards. Strait was elected into the Country Music Hall of Fame in 2006, performing his then-latest number-one hit "Give it Away" right before accepting his replica Hall of Fame plaque at the 40th CMA Awards. He was only the second artist (after Eddy Arnold in 1966) to be inducted into the Hall of Fame while still actively recording and producing chart-topping hits and albums.

As of June 8, 2010, Strait was named the top country-music artist of the past 25 years according to Billboard. In October 2008, the Academy of Country Music Awards named Strait their Artist of the Decade for the 2000s. He was presented the award by the previous winner Garth Brooks. Past winners of the award are Marty Robbins (1960s), Loretta Lynn (1970s), Alabama (1980s), and Garth Brooks (1990s). With the win of the entertainer-of-the-year award in 2013, he is the only artist to ever win that award in three different decades and also was the oldest winner. The win is currently the longest span between wins for that award, as well. Strait is also tied with Merle Haggard for the most male vocalist-of-the-year awards.

On June 1, 2013, Strait appeared at the Alamodome, in San Antonio, Texas, before 70,000 fans in the last concert of the first half of his two-year farewell tour. Governor Rick Perry, who was in attendance with First Lady Anita Thigpen Perry, announced that May 18, Strait's birthday, would be George Strait Day in Texas each year.

In 2023, Rolling Stone ranked Strait at number 156 on its list of the 200 Greatest Singers of All Time.

John F. Kennedy Center for the Performing Arts Honoree for Lifetime Artistic Achievement presented in December 2025 at the Kennedy Center in Washington D.C.

Year	Award	Category	Work	Ref
1985	Academy of Country Music	Top Male Vocalist	—	
1985	Country Music Association	Male Vocalist of the Year	—	
1985	Country Music Association	Album of the Year	Does Fort Worth Ever Cross Your Mind	
1986	Academy of Country Music	Top Male Vocalist	—	
1986	Academy of Country Music	Album of the Year	Does Fort Worth Ever Cross Your Mind	
1986	Music City News Country	Male Artist of the Year	—	
1986	Country Music Association	Male Vocalist of the Year	—	
1986	Billboard Year-End Awards	Top Country Artist	—	
1987	Billboard Year-End Awards	Top Country Artist	—	
1988	Academy of Country Music	Top Male Vocalist	—	
1989	Country Music Association	Entertainer of the Year	—	
1989	Special	Connie B. Gay Award	—	
1989	Academy of Country Music	Entertainer of the Year	—	
1989	Special	Presidential American Success Award	—	
1990	Country Music Association	Entertainer of the Year	—	
1990	Radio & Records	Country Performer of the Year	—	
1991	American Music Awards	Favorite Country Male Artist	—	
1993	Academy of Country Music	Tex Ritter Movie of the Year	Pure Country	
1995	Academy of Country Music	Single of the Year	"Check Yes or No"	
1995	ASCAP	Voice Of Music Award	—	
1996	TNN/Music City News	Video of the Year	"Check Yes or No"	
1996	TNN/Music City News	Single of the Year	"Check Yes or No"	
1996	TNN/Music City News	Album of the Year	Lead On	
1996	Music City News Country	Single of the Year	"Check Yes or No"	
1996	Country Music Association	Single of the Year	"Check Yes or No"	
1996	Country Music Association	Album of the Year	Blue Clear Sky	
1996	Country Music Association	Male Vocalist of the Year	—	
1996	Academy of Country Music	Top Male Vocalist	—	
1996	Academy of Country Music	Album of the Year	Blue Clear Sky	
1996	Radio & Records	Best Single	"Check Yes or No"	
1996	Radio & Records	Best Male Vocalist	—	
1996	Radio & Records	Most Valuable Performer	—	
1997	TNN/Music City News	Album of the Year	Blue Clear Sky	
1997	Country Music Association	Male Vocalist of the Year	—	
1997	Country Music Association	Album of the Year	Carrying Your Love With Me	
1997	American Music Awards	Favorite Country Album	Blue Clear Sky	
1997	Academy of Country Music	Top Male Vocalist	—	
1997	Academy of Country Music	Album of the Year	Carrying Your Love With Me	
1997	Radio & Records	Best Album	Blue Clear Sky	
1997	Radio & Records	Best Male Vocalist	—	
1998	Country Music Association	Male Vocalist of the Year	—	
1998	American Music Awards	Favorite Country Male Artist	—	
1998	American Music Awards	Favorite Country Album	Carrying Your Love With Me	
1998	Radio & Records	Best Male Vocalist	—	
1999	Country Weekly Golden Pick Awards	Favorite Song	"I Just Want to Dance with You"	
1999	Country Weekly Golden Pick Awards	Favorite Line Dance Song	"I Just Want to Dance with You"	
1999	Country Weekly Golden Pick Awards	Favorite Video Entertainer	—	
1999	Country Weekly Golden Pick Awards	Favorite Male Artist	—	
1999	Country Weekly Golden Pick Awards	Favorite Entertainer	—	
1999	Country Weekly / TNN/CMT Music Awards	Album of the Year	One Step at a Time	
2000	Country Weekly / TNN/CMT Music Awards	Impact Artist of the Year	—	
2000	Country Weekly / TNN/CMT Music Awards	Single of the Year	"Write This Down"	
2000	Country Weekly / TNN/CMT Music Awards	Male Artist of the Year	—	
2000	Country Weekly / TNN/CMT Music Awards	Entertainer of the Year	—	
2000	Country Weekly / TNN/CMT Music Awards	Album of the Year	Always Never The Same	
2000	Country Music Association	Vocal Event of the Year	"Murder on Music Row" (with Alan Jackson)	
2001	Country Music Association	Song of the Year	"Murder On Music Row" (awarded to songwriters)	
2002	Country Weekly	Favorite Collaborative Song	"Designated Drinker" (with Alan Jackson)	
2003	CMT 40 Greatest Men of Country Music	Ranked No. 9	—	
2003	Academy of Country Music	Special Achievement Award (in recognition of 50 No. 1 Songs)	—	
2003	Special Award	National Medal of Arts	—	
2004	Cheyenne Frontier Days	Hall of Fame	—	
2005	Country Music Association	Musical Event of the Year	"Good News, Bad News" (with Lee Ann Womack)	
2006	Honorary Doctoral Degree	Texas State University–San Marcos	—	
2006	Country Music Hall of Fame	Inducted into the Country Music Hall of Fame	—	
2006	Academy of Country Music	Single Record of the Year (artist)	"Give It Away"	
2006	Academy of Country Music	Single Record of the Year (producer)	"Give It Away"	
2006	Academy of Country Music	Song of the Year (artist)	"Give It Away"	
2007	Country Music Association	Song of the Year	"Give It Away" (awarded to songwriter Jamey Johnson)	
2007	Country Music Association	Album of the Year	It Just Comes Natural (for artist and producer)	
2008	Country Music Association	Single of the Year	"I Saw God Today"	
2008	Country Music Association	Album of the Year	Troubadour	
2009	Grammy Awards	Best Country Album	Troubadour	
2009	Academy of Country Music	Artist of the Decade	—	
2010	Billboard.com	Top Country Artist of the Past 25 Years	—	
2013	Country Radio Broadcasters Inc.	Country Radio Broadcasters Career Achievement Award	—	
2013	ASCAP	ASCAP Founders Award	—	
2013	Billboard Touring Awards	Legend of Live Award	—	
2013	Country Music Association	Entertainer of the Year	—	
2014	Academy of Country Music	Entertainer of the Year	—	
2015	Academy of Country Music	50th Anniversary Milestone Award Winner	—	
2017	Academy of Country Music	Cliffie Stone Icon Award	—	
2020	Billboard Music Awards	Top Country Tour		
2021	National Cowboy and Western Heritage Museum	Western Heritage Awards	Lifetime Achievement Award	
2024	Hollywood Walk of Fame	Inducted into Hollywood Walk of Fame Class of 2025		
2024	Country Music Association Awards	Willie Nelson Lifetime Achievement Award		
2025	John F. Kennedy Center for the Performing Arts	Honoree	Lifetime Achievement Award	
