= Strait Out of the Box: Part 2 =

Box set by George Strait
- Released: November 18, 2016
- Recorded: 1996 – 2016
- Genre: Country
- Length: Disc 1 - 64:58; Disc 2 - 68:43; Disc 3 - 68:40; Total - 3:22:21
- Label: MCA Nashville
- Producer: George Strait, Tony Brown, Chuck Ainlay

George Strait chronology
Strait for the Holidays (2016)	Strait Out of the Box: Part 2 (2016)	Honky Tonk Time Machine (2019)

Strait Out of the Box: Part 2 is the second box set album by American country music artist George Strait. It contains three albums worth of music, dating from 1996 up to 2016. The albums consist of 26 number one singles, 18 album cuts, and 2 new tracks that were co-written by Strait.

== Track listing ==
Disc one (1996–2000)
No.	Title	Writer(s)	Length
1.	"Blue Clear Sky"	Bob DiPiero, John Jarrard, Mark D. Sanders	2:52
2.	"Carried Away"	Steve Bogard, Jeff Stevens	3:19
3.	"Rockin' in the Arms of Your Memory"	Dean Dillon, Norro Wilson	4:16
4.	"I Can Still Make Cheyenne"	Aaron Barker, Erv Woolsey	4:14
5.	"Round About Way"	Steve Dean, Wil Nance	3:02
6.	"Carrying Your Love with Me"	Bogard, Stevens	3:50
7.	"One Night at a Time"	Roger Cook, Eddie Kilgallon, Earl Bud Lee	3:49
8.	"Today My World Slipped Away"	Mark Wright, Vern Gosdin	3:14
9.	"The Nerve"	Bobby Braddock	4:06
10.	"I Just Want to Dance with You"	Cook, John Prine	3:27
11.	"True"	Marv Green, Stevens	3:36
12.	"Maria"	Robert Earl Keen	4:36
13.	"We Really Shouldn't Be Doing This"	Jim Lauderdale	2:29
14.	"Meanwhile"	Wayland Holyfield, Fred Knoblock	3:36
15.	"Write This Down"	Dana Hunt Oglesby, Kent Robbins	3:41
16.	"The Best Day"	Carson Chamberlain, Dillon	3:24
17.	"Looking Out My Window Through the Pain"	John Schweers	3:39
18.	"Go On"	Tony Martin, Mark Nesler	3:48

Disc two (2001–2008)
No.	Title	Writer(s)	Length
1.	"She'll Leave You with a Smile"	Odie Blackmon, Jay Knowles	2:58
2.	"Run"	Tony Lane, Anthony Smith	4:05
3.	"Living and Living Well"	Martin, Nesler, Tom Shapiro	3:38
4.	"My Life's Been Grand"	Merle Haggard, Terry Gordon	2:38
5.	"Cowboys Like Us"	DiPiero, Smith	3:39
6.	"Desperately"	Bruce Robison, Monte Warden	4:09
7.	"Four Down and Twelve Across"	Dillon, Tom Douglas	2:51
8.	"I Hate Everything"	Gary Harrison, Keith Stegall	3:55
9.	"The Seashores of Old Mexico"	Haggard	4:11
10.	"She Let Herself Go"	Dillon, Kerry Kurt Phillips	3:18
11.	"Give It Away"	Bill Anderson, Buddy Cannon, Jamey Johnson	3:30
12.	"Wrapped"	Robison	4:09
13.	"It Just Comes Natural"	Green, Jim Collins	2:58
14.	"Texas Cookin'"	Guy Clark	4:25
15.	"How 'Bout Them Cowgirls"	Casey Beathard, Ed Hill	3:57
16.	"Come On Joe"	Tony Romeo	3:49
17.	"Troubadour"	Leslie Satcher, Monty Holmes	2:56
18.	"River of Love"	Billy Burnette, Dennis Morgan, Shawn Camp	3:15
19.	"I Saw God Today"	Rodney Clawson, Wade Kirby, Monty Criswell	3:22

Disc three (2009–2016)
No.	Title	Writer(s)	Length
1.	"Living for the Night"	Dillon, Bubba Strait, George Strait	3:41
2.	"Out of Sight, Out of Mind"	B. Strait, G. Strait	3:07
3.	"Arkansas Dave"	B. Strait	3:18
4.	"Love's Gonna Make It Alright"	Al Anderson, Chris Stapleton	3:50
5.	"Drinkin' Man"	Dillon, B. Strait, G. Strait	4:27
6.	"Shame On Me"	B. Strait, G. Strait	2:39
7.	"Here for a Good Time"	Dillon, B. Strait, G. Strait	3:01
8.	"House Across the Bay"	Dillon, B. Strait, G. Strait	3:36
9.	"Blue Marlin Blues"	Dillon, B. Strait, G. Strait	3:24
10.	"I'll Always Remember You"	Dillon, B. Strait, G. Strait	3:54
11.	"Give It All We Got Tonight"	Mark Bright, Tim James, Phil O'Donnell	4:11
12.	"I Just Can't Go On Dying Like This"	G. Strait	3:57
13.	"That's What Breaking Hearts Do"	G. Strait, B. Strait	3:30
14.	"The Night Is Young"	Dillon, B. Strait, G. Strait	3:32
15.	"I Believe"	Dillon, B. Strait, G. Strait	3:46
16.	"Goin' Goin' Gone"	Wyatt Earp, Keith Gattis	4:14
17.	"Everything I See"	G. Strait, B. Strait, Dillon, Gattis	3:49
18.	"Kicked Outta Country"	G. Strait, Johnson	3:59
19.	"You Gotta Go Through Hell"	Dillon, B. Strait, G. Strait	2:45

== Chart performance ==
=== Weekly charts ===
Chart (2016)	Peak position
US Billboard 200	20
US Top Country Albums (Billboard)	3

=== Year-end charts ===
Chart (2017)	Position
US Top Country Albums (Billboard)	55
