= 50 Number Ones =

Greatest hits album by George Strait
- Released: October 5, 2004
- Recorded: 1982–2004
- Genres: Neotraditional country; honky-tonk
- Length: 154:48
- Label: MCA Nashville
- Producers: Ray Baker; Jimmy Bowen; Tony Brown; Blake Mevis; George Strait

George Strait chronology
20th Century Masters: The Christmas Collection: The Best of George Strait (2003)	50 Number Ones (2004)	Somewhere Down in Texas (2005)

Singles from 50 Number Ones
- 1. "I Hate Everything" Released: July 5, 2004

Professional ratings
Review scores
Source	Rating
Allmusic	5/5 stars
The Village Voice	(average)

50 Number Ones is the sixth compilation album by American country music singer George Strait, released on October 5, 2004. It is a 2-CD compilation of his first 50 number-one country music singles, starting with 1982's "Fool Hearted Memory" and presented in chronological order. A new track, "I Hate Everything", was also included and became his 51st overall number one in 2004. The figure of "50 Number Ones" includes not just songs that reached the top of the Billboard Hot Country Songs chart but also those that topped the Radio & Records and Gavin Report charts.

Some of the songs have been edited for red-book standard purposes to fit all the songs on the discs. It had a companion album called 22 More Hits released in 2007 that featured Strait's hits and fan-favorites that otherwise did not reach number-one any trade charts.

== Commercial performance ==
The album was certified 7× Platinum by the RIAA on December 13, 2007 for 3.5 million copies shipped. It has sold 3,791,500 copies in the US as of April 2015, and 5,531,000 units including tracks and streams as of January 2020.

== Track listing ==
Disc one
No.	Title	Writer(s)	Original album	Length
1.	"I Hate Everything"	Gary Harrison, Keith Stegall	Previously unreleased	3:55
2.	"Fool Hearted Memory" (single version)	Byron Hill, Blake Mevis	Strait from the Heart (1982)	2:12
3.	"A Fire I Can't Put Out"	Darryl Staedtler	Strait from the Heart	2:57
4.	"You Look So Good in Love" (single version)	Rory Bourke, Glen Ballard, Kerry Chater	Right or Wrong (1983)	2:57
5.	"Right or Wrong"	Arthur L. Sizemore, Haven Gillespie, Paul Biese	Right or Wrong	2:03
6.	"Let's Fall to Pieces Together" (single version)	Dickey Lee, Tommy Rocco, Johnny Russell	Right or Wrong	2:21
7.	"Does Fort Worth Ever Cross Your Mind" (single version)	Sanger D. Shafer, Darlene Shafer	Does Fort Worth Ever Cross Your Mind (1984)	3:05
8.	"The Chair"	Hank Cochran, Dean Dillon	Something Special (1985)	2:48
9.	"Nobody in His Right Mind Would've Left Her"	Dillon	#7 (1986)	2:49
10.	"It Ain't Cool to Be Crazy About You" (single version)	Dillon, Royce Porter	#7	2:38
11.	"Ocean Front Property" (single version)	Dillon, Cochran, Porter	Ocean Front Property (1987)	2:40
12.	"All My Ex's Live in Texas"	S. Shafer, Lyndia J. Shafer	Ocean Front Property	3:17
13.	"Am I Blue"	David Chamberlain	Ocean Front Property	3:04
14.	"Famous Last Words of a Fool" (single version)	Dillon, Rex Huston	If You Ain't Lovin', You Ain't Livin' (1988)	3:19
15.	"Baby Blue"	Aaron Barker	If You Ain't Lovin', You Ain't Livin'	3:29
16.	"If You Ain't Lovin' (You Ain't Livin')"	Tommy Collins	If You Ain't Lovin', You Ain't Livin'	2:17
17.	"Baby's Gotten Good at Goodbye" (single version)	Tony Martin, Troy Martin	Beyond the Blue Neon (1989)	2:55
18.	"What's Going On in Your World"	Chamberlain, Porter, Red Steagall	Beyond the Blue Neon	3:26
19.	"Ace in the Hole"	Dennis Adkins	Beyond the Blue Neon	2:34
20.	"Love Without End, Amen"	Aaron Barker	Livin' It Up (1990)	3:05
21.	"I've Come to Expect It from You"	Dillon, Buddy Cannon	Livin' It Up	3:42
22.	"If I Know Me"	Dillon, Pam Belford	Chill of an Early Fall (1991)	2:41
23.	"You Know Me Better Than That"	Tony Haselden, Anna Lisa Graham	Chill of an Early Fall	3:00
24.	"The Chill of an Early Fall" (single version)	Green Daniel, Gretchen Peters	Chill of an Early Fall	3:16
25.	"So Much Like My Dad"	Chips Moman, Bobby Emmons	Holding My Own (1992)	3:19
26.	"I Cross My Heart"	Steve Dorff, Eric Kaz	Pure Country (1992)	3:29
Total length:				77:18

Disc two
No.	Title	Writer(s)	Original album	Length
1.	"Heartland"	Dorff, John Bettis	Pure Country	2:16
2.	"Easy Come, Easy Go" (single version)	Barker, Dillon	Easy Come, Easy Go (1993)	2:35
3.	"I'd Like to Have That One Back"	Bill Shore, Rick West, Aaron Barker	Easy Come, Easy Go	3:48
4.	"The Man in Love with You"	Dorff, Gary Harju	Easy Come, Easy Go	3:18
5.	"The Big One"	Gerry House, Devon O'Day	Lead On (1994)	2:05
6.	"You Can't Make a Heart Love Somebody" (single version)	Steve Clark, Johnny MacRae	Lead On	2:48
7.	"Lead On"	Dillon, Teddy Gentry	Lead On	3:21
8.	"Check Yes or No"	Danny Wells, Dana Hunt Black	Strait Out of the Box (1995)	3:10
9.	"I Know She Still Loves Me"	Barker, Monty Holmes	Strait Out of the Box	3:04
10.	"Blue Clear Sky" (single version)	Mark D. Sanders, John Jarrard, Bob DiPiero	Blue Clear Sky (1996)	2:34
11.	"Carried Away" (single version)	Steve Bogard, Jeff Stevens	Blue Clear Sky	2:58
12.	"I Can Still Make Cheyenne"	Barker, Erv Woolsey	Blue Clear Sky	4:11
13.	"One Night at a Time" (single version)	Roger Cook, Eddie Kilgallon, Earl Bud Lee	Carrying Your Love With Me (1997)	3:19
14.	"Carrying Your Love with Me" (single version)	Bogard, Stevens	Carrying Your Love With Me	3:07
15.	"Today My World Slipped Away"	Mark Wright, Vern Gosdin	Carrying Your Love With Me	3:05
16.	"Round About Way" (single version)	Steve Dean, Wil Nance	Carrying Your Love With Me	2:50
17.	"I Just Want to Dance with You" (single version)	Cook, John Prine	One Step at a Time (1998)	3:18
18.	"True" (single version)	Marv Green, Stevens	One Step at a Time	3:12
19.	"We Really Shouldn't Be Doing This"	Jim Lauderdale	One Step at a Time	2:23
20.	"Write This Down"	Black, Kent Robbins	Always Never the Same (1999)	3:33
21.	"The Best Day"	Carson Chamberlain, Dillon	Latest Greatest Straitest Hits (2000)	3:18
22.	"Go On" (single version)	Tony Martin, Mark Nesler	George Strait (2000)	3:21
23.	"Run" (single version)	Tony Lane, Anthony Smith	The Road Less Traveled (2001)	3:46
24.	"Living and Living Well" (single version)	Tony Martin, Mark Nesler, Tom Shapiro	The Road Less Traveled	3:27
25.	"She'll Leave You with a Smile" (single version)	Odie Blackmon, Jay Knowles	The Road Less Traveled	2:44
Total length:				77:30

== Charts ==
=== Weekly charts ===
Chart (2004)	Peak position
Canadian Albums (Billboard)	8
US Billboard 200	1
US Top Country Albums (Billboard)	1

=== Year-end charts ===
Chart (2004)	Position
US Billboard 200	65
US Top Country Albums (Billboard)	11
Worldwide Albums (IFPI)	31
Chart (2005)	Position
US Billboard 200	31
US Top Country Albums (Billboard)	6
Chart (2006)	Position
US Top Country Albums (Billboard)	44
Chart (2017)	Position
US Top Country Albums (Billboard)	97
Chart (2018)	Position
US Top Country Albums (Billboard)	46
Chart (2019)	Position
US Billboard 200	188
US Top Country Albums (Billboard)	20
Chart (2020)	Position
US Billboard 200	175
US Top Country Albums (Billboard)	23
Chart (2021)	Position
US Top Country Albums (Billboard)	37
Chart (2022)	Position
US Billboard 200	155
US Top Country Albums (Billboard)	19
Chart (2023)	Position
US Billboard 200	144
US Top Country Albums (Billboard)	23
Chart (2024)	Position
US Billboard 200	120
US Top Country Albums (Billboard)	25
Chart (2025)	Position
US Billboard 200	114
US Top Country Albums (Billboard)	23

== Certifications ==
Certifications for 50 Number Ones
Region	Certification	Certified units/sales
United States (RIAA)	7× Platinum	3,500,000^{^}
^{^} Shipments figures based on certification alone.
