= Icon 2 =

Compilation album by George Strait
- Released: November 8, 2011
- Genre: Country
- Length: 71:03
- Label: MCA Nashville

George Strait chronology
| Icon (2011) | Icon 2 (2011) | Love Is Everything (2013) |

Professional ratings
Review scores
| Source | Rating |
|---|---|
| Allmusic | 3.5/5 stars |

Icon 2 is a compilation album by American country music artist George Strait. It was released on November 8, 2011. The album is part of a series of similar Icon albums released by MCA Nashville as eleven more songs in between. The album has sold 204,500 copies in the United States as of April 2017.

== Track listing ==
CD 1
| No. | Title | Writer(s) | Length |
|---|---|---|---|
| 1. | "Amarillo by Morning" | Paul Fraser, Terry Stafford | 2:53 |
| 2. | "Right or Wrong" | Paul Biese, Haven Gillespie, Arthur L. Sizemore | 2:05 |
| 3. | "The Chair" | Hank Cochran, Dean Dillon | 2:50 |
| 4. | "Ocean Front Property" | Dillon, Cochran, Royce Porter | 3:08 |
| 5. | "All My Ex's Live in Texas" | Sanger D. Shafer, Linda J. Shafer | 3:20 |
| 6. | "If You Ain't Lovin' (You Ain't Livin')" | Tommy Collins | 2:20 |
| 7. | "Ace In the Hole" | Dennis Adkins | 2:37 |
| 8. | "Love Without End, Amen" | Aaron Barker | 3:06 |
| 9. | "I Cross My Heart" | Steve Dorff, Eric Kaz | 3:31 |
| 10. | "Easy Come, Easy Go" | Barker, Dillon | 3:04 |
| 11. | "Check Yes or No" | Danny Wells, Dana Hunt Black | 3:10 |

CD 2
| No. | Title | Writer(s) | Length |
|---|---|---|---|
| 1. | "Carried Away" | Steve Bogard, Jeff Stevens | 3:21 |
| 2. | "One Night at a Time" | Roger Cook, Eddie Kilgallon, Earl Bud Lee | 3:51 |
| 3. | "Carrying Your Love with Me" | Stevens, Bogard | 3:51 |
| 4. | "I Just Want to Dance with You" | Cook, John Prine | 3:19 |
| 5. | "Write This Down" | Black, Kent Robbins | 3:35 |
| 6. | "The Best Day" | Carson Chamberlain, Dillon | 3:20 |
| 7. | "Living and Living Well" | Tony Martin, Mark Nesler, Tom Shapiro | 3:38 |
| 8. | "I Hate Everything" | Gary Harrison, Keith Stegall | 3:55 |
| 9. | "Give It Away" | Bill Anderson, Buddy Cannon, Jamey Johnson | 3:30 |
| 10. | "I Saw God Today" | Rodney Clawson, Monty Criswell, Wade Kirby | 3:25 |
| 11. | "River of Love" | Billy Burnette, Shawn Camp, Dennis Morgan | 3:13 |

== Charts ==
=== Weekly charts ===
| Chart (2011–2018) | Peak position |
|---|---|
| US Billboard 200 | 135 |
| US Top Country Albums (Billboard) | 16 |

=== Year-end charts ===
| Chart (2018) | Position |
|---|---|
| US Top Country Albums (Billboard) | 83 |
