= Latest Greatest Straitest Hits =

Greatest hits album by George Strait
- Released: March 7, 2000
- Genre: Country
- Length: 52:09
- Label: MCA Records
- Producers: Tony Brown; George Strait

George Strait chronology
Merry Christmas Wherever You Are (1999)	Latest Greatest Straitest Hits (2000)	George Strait (2000)

Singles from Latest Greatest Straitest Hits
- 1. "The Best Day" Released: January 3, 2000

Professional ratings
Review scores
Source	Rating
About.com	5/5 stars
Allmusic	4.5/5 stars
Entertainment Weekly	A
Q	4/5 stars

Latest Greatest Straitest Hits is the fifth compilation album by American country music artist George Strait. It was released on March 7, 2000 by MCA Records. The album represents his greatest hits since the release of his 1995 box set Strait Out of the Box. The set contains two newly recorded tracks. "The Best Day" was released as a single and hit #1 on Billboard's Hot Country Singles & Tracks. Although not a single, "Murder on Music Row" (a duet with Alan Jackson) also charted in the Top 40 from unsolicited airplay.

The album does not include any singles from his 1999 album Always Never the Same. Another notable omission is "I Just Want to Dance with You", a #1 hit from 1998.

In March 2003 the album was certified Double Platinum by the RIAA.

== Track listing ==
No.	Title	Writer(s)	Length
1.	"The Best Day"	Carson Chamberlain, Dean Dillon	3:24
2.	"Murder on Music Row" (duet with Alan Jackson)	Larry Cordle, Larry Shell	4:22
3.	"Carrying Your Love with Me"	Steve Bogard, Jeff Stevens	3:50
4.	"Adalida"	Mike Geiger, Mike Huffman, Woody Mullis	3:35
5.	"Lead On"	Dillon, Teddy Gentry	3:26
6.	"Carried Away"	Bogard, Stevens	3:21
7.	"Blue Clear Sky"	Bob DiPiero, John Jarrard, Mark D. Sanders	2:53
8.	"We Really Shouldn't Be Doing This"	Jim Lauderdale	2:30
9.	"I Can Still Make Cheyenne"	Aaron Barker, Erv Woolsey	4:15
10.	"True"	Marv Green, Stevens	3:36
11.	"King of the Mountain"	Larry Boone, Paul Nelson	3:29
12.	"Round About Way"	Steve Dean, Wil Nance	3:03
13.	"You Can't Make a Heart Love Somebody"	Steve Clark, Johnny MacRae	3:20
14.	"One Night at a Time"	Roger Cook, Eddie Kilgallon, Earl Bud Lee	3:50
15.	"Today My World Slipped Away"	Vern Gosdin, Mark Wright	3:14

== Personnel ==
Tracks 1 and 2

- Eddie Bayers – drums
- Stuart Duncan – fiddle
- Paul Franklin – steel guitar
- Steve Gibson – acoustic guitar
- Wes Hightower – background vocals on "The Best Day"
- Alan Jackson – lead vocals and background vocals on "Murder on Music Row"
- Liana Manis – background vocals on "The Best Day"
- Brent Mason – electric guitar
- Steve Nathan – keyboards
- George Strait – lead vocals, background vocals on "Murder on Music Row"
- Lee Ann Womack – background vocals on "Murder on Music Row"
- Glenn Worf – bass guitar

== Charts ==
=== Weekly charts ===
Chart (2000)	Peak position
Canadian Country Albums (RPM)	5
US Billboard 200	2
US Top Country Albums (Billboard)	1

=== Year-end charts ===
Chart (2000)	Position
Canadian Albums (Nielsen SoundScan)	179
US Billboard 200	76
US Top Country Albums (Billboard)	7
Chart (2001)	Position
US Top Country Albums (Billboard)	37

== Certifications ==
Region	Certification	Certified units/sales
Canada (Music Canada)	Gold	50,000^{^}
United States (RIAA)	2× Platinum	2,000,000^{^}
^{^} Shipments figures based on certification alone.
