= List of RPM number-one country singles of 1997 =

These are the Canadian number-one country songs of 1997, per the RPM Country Tracks chart.

Issue date	Title	Artist	Source
January 13	I Meant to Do That	Paul Brandt	
January 20	Nobody Knows	Kevin Sharp	
January 27	Maybe We Should Just Sleep on It	Tim McGraw	
February 3	Friends	John Michael Montgomery	
February 10	Is That a Tear	Tracy Lawrence	
February 17	Everybody Knows	Trisha Yearwood	
February 24	We Danced Anyway	Deana Carter	
March 3	We Danced Anyway	Deana Carter	
March 10	We Danced Anyway	Deana Carter	
March 17	Emotional Girl	Terri Clark	
March 24	We Danced Anyway	Deana Carter	
March 31	We Danced Anyway	Deana Carter	
April 7	We Danced Anyway	Deana Carter	
April 14	How Was I to Know	Reba McEntire	
April 21	(This Ain't) No Thinkin' Thing	Trace Adkins	
April 28	(This Ain't) No Thinkin' Thing	Trace Adkins	
May 5	Rumor Has It	Clay Walker	
May 12	One Night at a Time	George Strait	
May 19	One Night at a Time	George Strait	
May 26	One Night at a Time	George Strait	
June 2	Sad Lookin' Moon	Alabama	
June 9	Take It from Me	Paul Brandt	
June 16	Sittin' on Go	Bryan White	
June 23	It's Your Love	Tim McGraw with Faith Hill	
June 30	It's Your Love	Tim McGraw with Faith Hill	
July 7	It's Your Love	Tim McGraw with Faith Hill	
July 14	It's Your Love	Tim McGraw with Faith Hill	
July 21	Little Ol' Kisses	Julian Austin	
July 28	Carrying Your Love with Me	George Strait	
August 4	Carrying Your Love with Me	George Strait	
August 11	I Left Something Turned On at Home	Trace Adkins	
August 18	Still Holding On	Clint Black with Martina McBride	
August 25	Still Holding On	Clint Black with Martina McBride	
September 1	How Do I Live	Trisha Yearwood	
September 8	How Do I Live	Trisha Yearwood	
September 15	She's Got It All	Kenny Chesney	
September 22	There Goes	Alan Jackson	
September 29	How Your Love Makes Me Feel	Diamond Rio	
October 6	How Your Love Makes Me Feel	Diamond Rio	
October 13	Love Gets Me Every Time	Shania Twain	
October 20	Love Gets Me Every Time	Shania Twain	
October 27	Love Gets Me Every Time	Shania Twain	
November 3	Love Gets Me Every Time	Shania Twain	
November 10	Love Gets Me Every Time	Shania Twain	
November 17	Love Gets Me Every Time	Shania Twain	
November 24	A Little in Love	Paul Brandt	
December 1	I'm Feeling Kind of Lucky Tonight	Charlie Major	
December 8	Longneck Bottle	Garth Brooks	
December 15	Longneck Bottle	Garth Brooks	

== See also ==
- 1997 in music
- List of number-one country hits of 1997 (U.S.)
