= Icon (George Strait album) =

Compilation album by George Strait
- Released: September 13, 2011
- Genre: Country
- Length: 36:14
- Label: MCA Nashville

George Strait chronology
Here for a Good Time (2011)	Icon (2011)	Icon 2 (2011)

Professional ratings
Review scores
Source	Rating
Allmusic	3.5/5 stars

Icon is a compilation album by American country music artist George Strait. It was released on September 13, 2011. The album is part of a series of similar Icon albums released by Universal Music Enterprises. As of December 2012, the album has sold 212,000 copies.

== Track listing ==
No.	Title	Writer(s)	Length
1.	"Amarillo by Morning"	Paul Fraser, Terry Stafford	2:54
2.	"Ocean Front Property"	Dean Dillon, Hank Cochran, Royce Porter	3:08
3.	"All My Ex's Live in Texas"	Sanger D. Shafer, Linda J. Shafer	3:20
4.	"Love Without End, Amen"	Aaron Barker	3:06
5.	"I Cross My Heart"	Steve Dorff, Eric Kaz	3:31
6.	"Check Yes or No"	Danny Wells, Dana Hunt Black	3:10
7.	"I Just Want to Dance with You"	Roger Cook, John Prine	3:20
8.	"Living and Living Well"	Tony Martin, Mark Nesler, Tom Shapiro	3:38
9.	"Give It Away"	Bill Anderson, Buddy Cannon, Jamey Johnson	3:30
10.	"I Saw God Today"	Rodney Clawson, Monty Criswell, Wade Kirby	3:24
11.	"River of Love"	Billy Burnette, Shawn Camp, Dennis Morgan	3:13
Total length:			36:14

== Chart positions ==
=== Weekly charts ===
Chart (2011)	Peak position
Canadian Albums (Billboard)	80
US Billboard 200	62
US Top Country Albums (Billboard)	14

=== Year-end charts ===
Chart (2012)	Position
US Top Country Albums (Billboard)	37
Chart (2013)	Position
US Top Country Albums (Billboard)	75

== Certifications ==
Region	Certification	Certified units/sales
Canada (Music Canada)	Gold	40,000^{^}
^{^} Shipments figures based on certification alone.
