= Noel Haggard =

American singer-songwriter

Noel Lee Haggard
- Born: September 4, 1963 (age 61)
- Origin: Bakersfield, California, U.S.
- Genres: Country
- Occupation: Singer
- Instruments: Vocals; guitar
- Years active: 1997–present
- Labels: Atlantic

Noel Lee Haggard (born September 4, 1963) is an American country music artist.

Haggard is the son of country music legend Merle Haggard. He was signed to a recording deal with Atlantic Records and released his debut album, One Lifetime, in 1997. The album produced two singles, both of which peaked at No. 75 on the Billboard Hot Country Singles & Tracks chart.

His first single, "Once You Learn," also peaked at No. 72 on the RPM Country Tracks chart in Canada. His second single, "Tell Me Something Bad About Tulsa," was covered by George Strait on his 2003 album Honkytonkville. Strait's version of the song peaked at No. 11 on the Hot Country Singles & Tracks chart.

Haggard was also featured on the soundtrack of the 1994 film Maverick as a member of the "Maverick Choir.". Noel was a member of the Strangers and opened up shows for Merle his whole professional life. He continues to perform with the remaining Strangers and his brother Ben, since the passing of Merle.

== One Lifetime (1997) ==
One Lifetime

Studio album by Noel Haggard
- Released: March 4, 1997
- Genre: Country
- Length: 33:36
- Label: Atlantic
- Producer: Barry Beckett

=== Track listing ===
1. "Cowgirl Blues" (Luke Reed, Phil Thomas) - 3:58
2. "You Ain't in It" (Shawn Camp, Tim Mensy) - 2:52
3. "Once You Learn" (Billy Livsey, Don Schlitz) - 3:16
4. "Palm of My Hand" (Gene Dobbins, Mensy) - 3:31
5. "Wishin' on a Lone Star" (Jess Brown, Brett Jones) - 3:13
6. "One Life Time" (Buddy Brock, Michael Huffman, Rick Williamson) - 3:14
7. "Left, Leavin', Goin' or Gone" (Frank J. Myers, Don Pfrimmer) - 2:48
8. "I've Learned to Live" (Dean Dillon, Frank Dycus) - 3:53
9. "I Can't" (Brown, Jones) - 3:38
10. "Tell Me Something Bad About Tulsa" (Red Lane) - 3:13

=== Personnel ===
- Eddie Bayers - drums
- Barry Beckett - keyboards
- Paul Franklin - steel guitar
- Noel Haggard - lead vocals
- Owen Hale - drums
- Terry McMillan - percussion
- Phil Naish - keyboards
- Bobby Ogdin - keyboards
- Don Potter - acoustic guitar
- Michael Rhodes - bass guitar
- Brent Rowan - electric guitar
- John Wesley Ryles - background vocals
- Joe Spivey - fiddle
- Harry Stinson - background vocals
- Billy Joe Walker Jr. - acoustic guitar
- Willie Weeks - bass guitar
- Dennis Wilson - background vocals
- Curtis Young - background vocals

=== Singles ===
Year	Single	Peak chart positions	
Year	Single	US Country	CAN Country
1997	"Once You Learn"	75	72
1997	"Tell Me Something Bad About Tulsa"	75	—
"—" denotes releases that did not chart

=== Music videos ===
Year	Video	Director
1997	"Once You Learn"	Bob Gabrielsen
1997	"Tell Me Something Bad About Tulsa"	chris rogers [sic]
