= List of Top Country Albums number ones of 2000 =

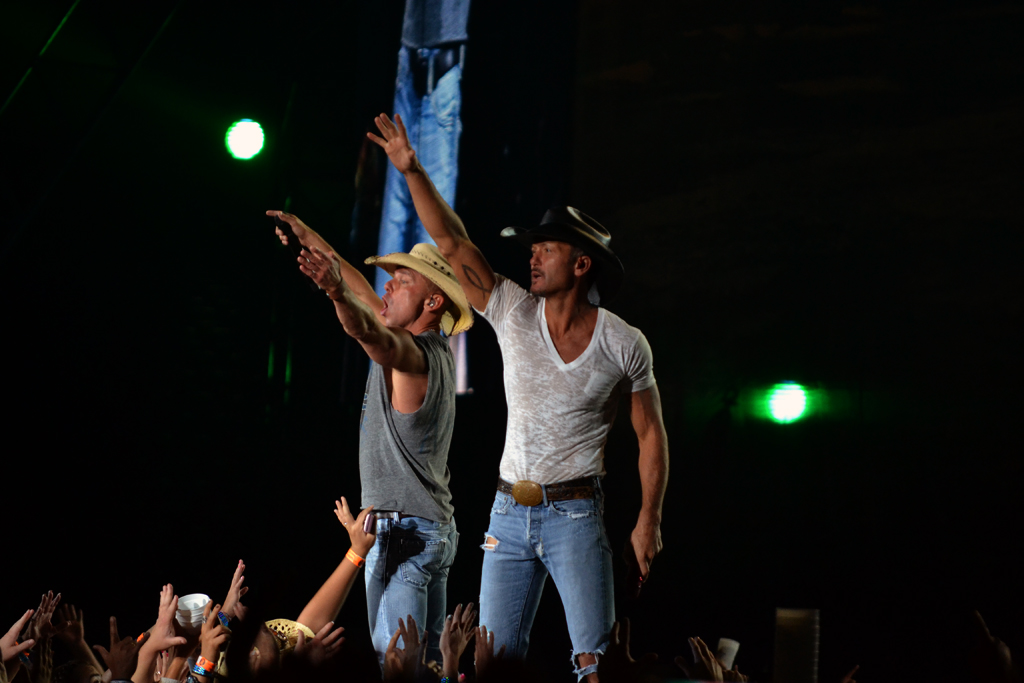
Kenny Chesney (left) and Tim McGraw each reached number one in 2000 with an album entitled Greatest Hits.

Top Country Albums is a chart that ranks the top-performing country music albums in the United States, published by Billboard. In 2000, 11 different albums topped the chart, based on electronic point of sale data provided by SoundScan Inc.

In the issue of Billboard dated January 1, Canadian singer Shania Twain was at number one with her album Come On Over, the album's 49th week in the top spot. It remained atop the chart for one further week for a final total of 50 weeks at number one, making it the longest-running chart-topper in the history of the Top Country Albums listing. In 2000, it was recognized by the Recording Industry Association of America as the highest-selling album of all time by a female artist, as well as the biggest-selling country album. Its time at number one finally came to an end in the issue of Billboard dated January 15 when it was displaced by Fly by the Dixie Chicks, which returned to the top spot having initially reached number one the previous September. The album had three lengthy spells at number one in 2000 totalling 28 weeks in the top spot. This brought the album's total number of weeks in the top spot to 36, the fourth highest figure in the chart's history. It was the second of three consecutive releases by the all-female trio to win the Grammy Award for Best Country Album.

Three acts topped the chart for the first time in 2000. In June, Lee Ann Womack gained her first number one when I Hope You Dance spent a single week in the top spot. Two months later, Jo Dee Messina achieved the same feat with Burn. Finally, Kenny Chesney topped the chart for the first time with his compilation album Greatest Hits. Chesney would go on to become one of the biggest country music stars of the early 21st century, with 16 chart-topping albums by 2018. Two other compilations topped the chart in 2000: George Strait spent two weeks at number one with Latest Greatest Straitest Hits and Tim McGraw spent the final four weeks of the year atop the listing with Greatest Hits. Strait was the only artist to achieve more than one number one during the year, as he also reached the peak position with an eponymous album. Faith Hill, McGraw's wife, returned to number one with her album Breathe in October, nearly a year after it had topped the chart for an initial two weeks in November and December 1999.

== Chart history ==
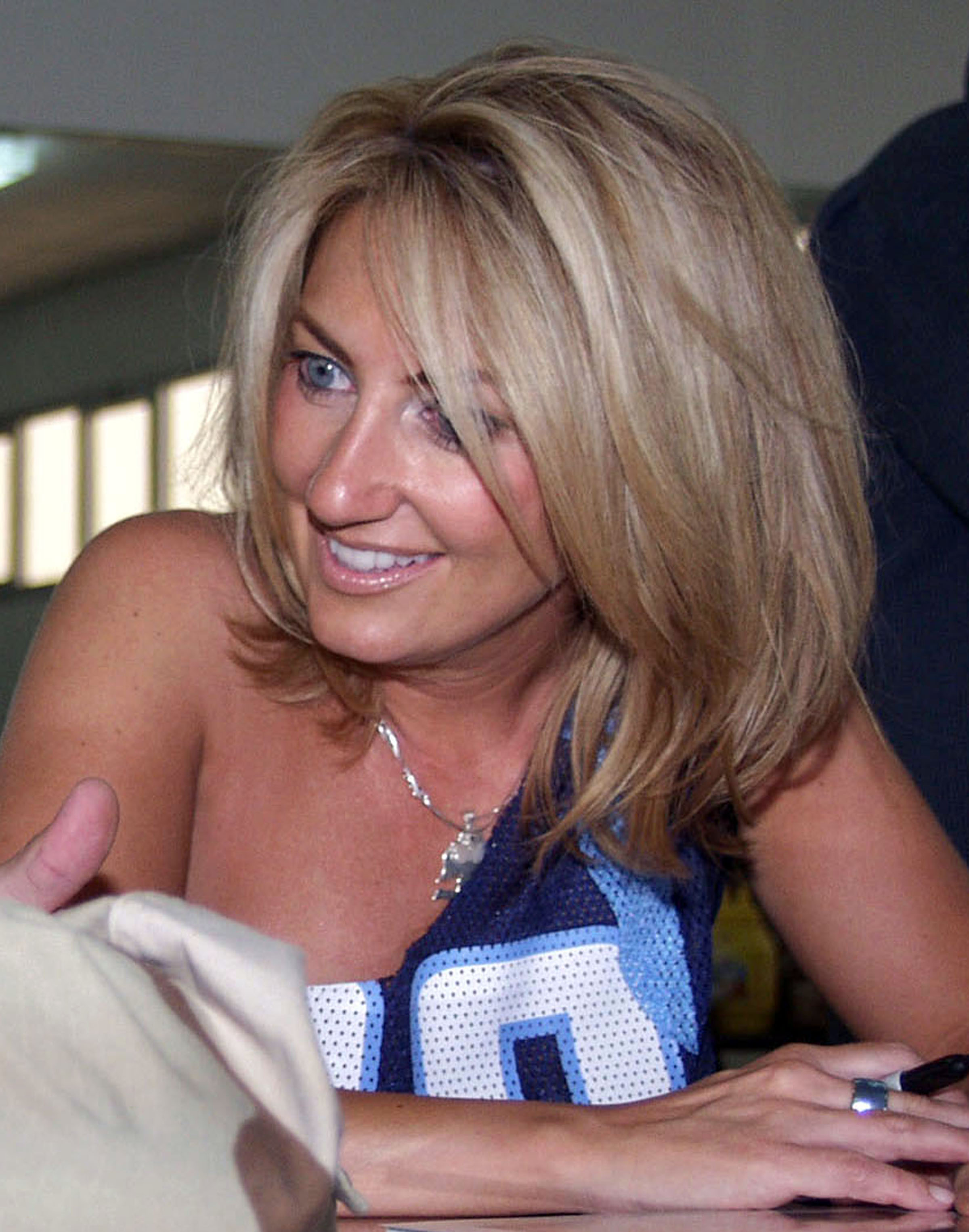
I Hope You Dance was the first number one for Lee Ann Womack.

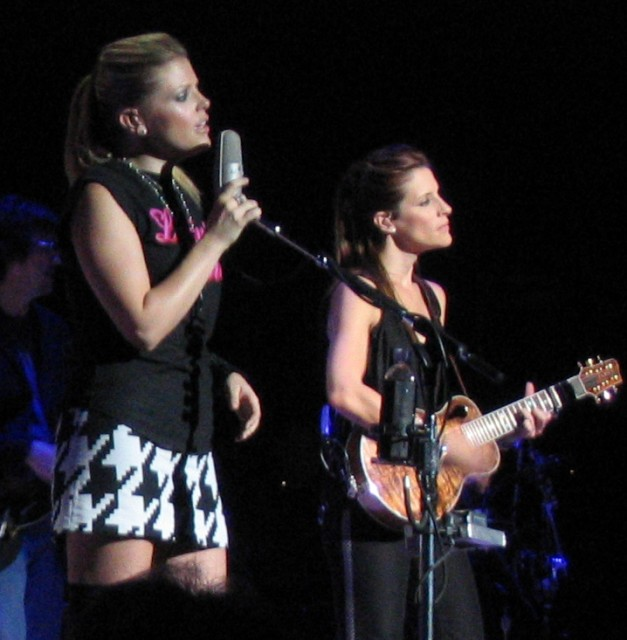
Fly by the Dixie Chicks had three lengthy spells at number one in 2000.

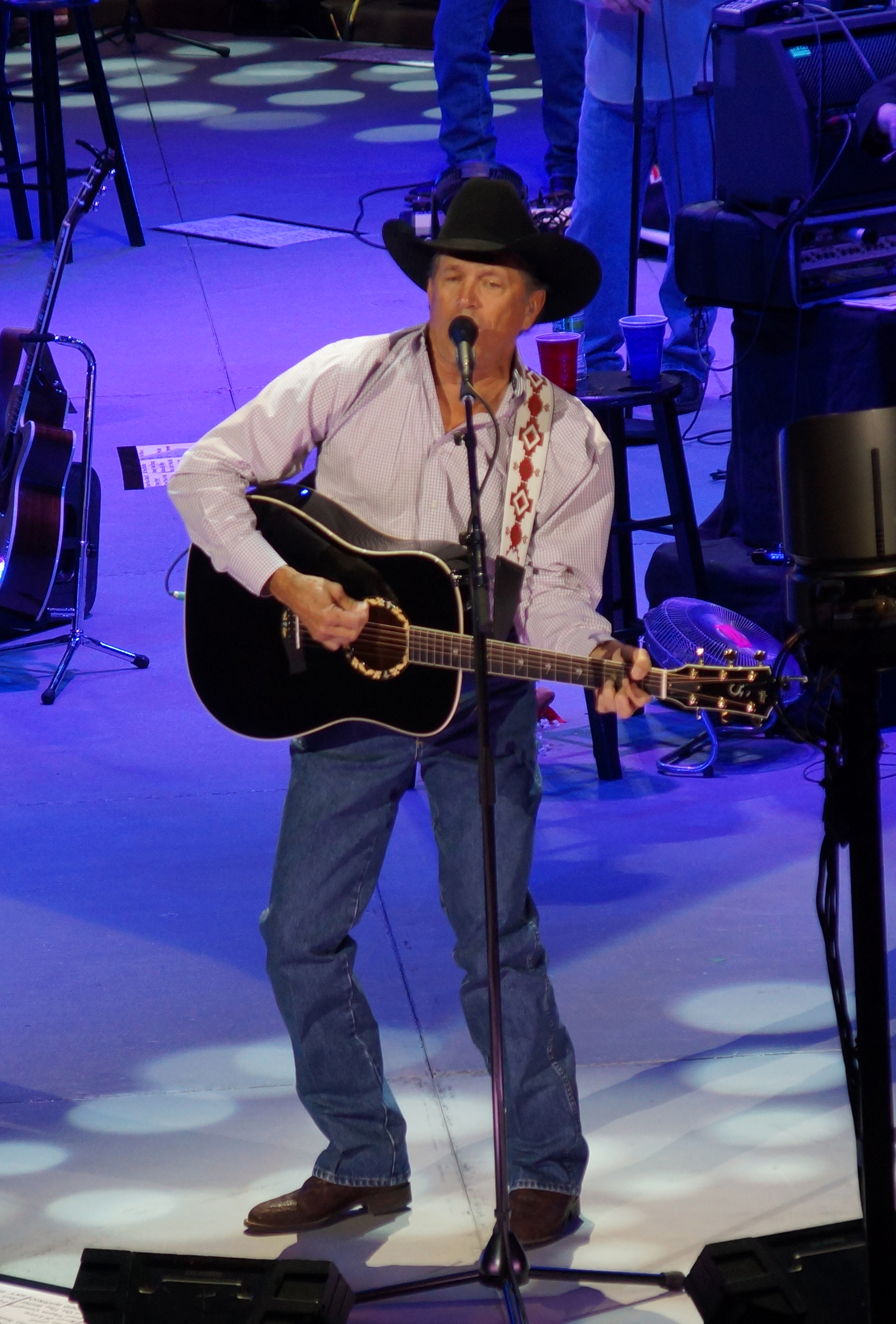
George Strait topped the chart with two albums during the year.

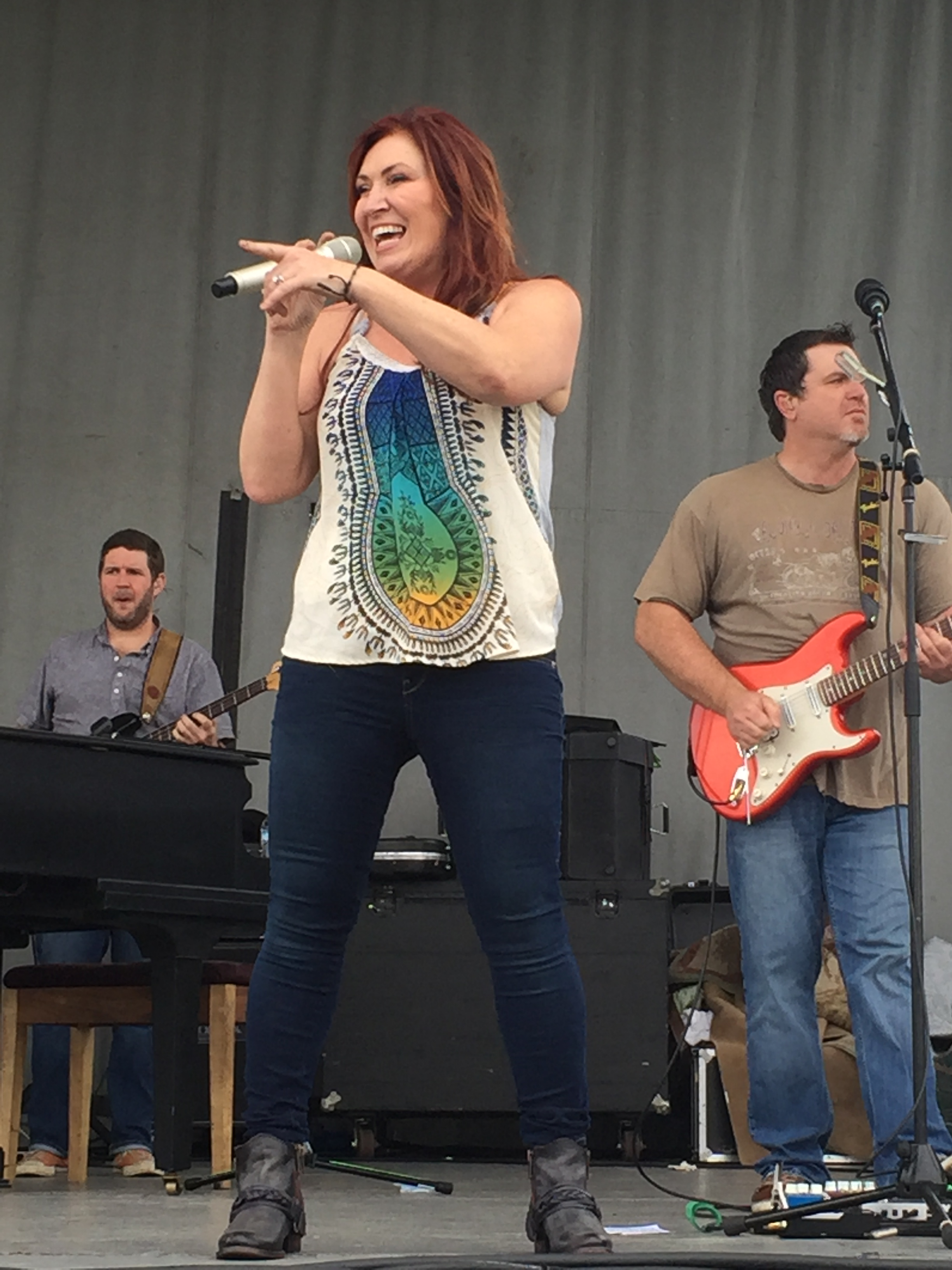
Jo Dee Messina gained her first chart-topper with Burn.

Issue date	Title	Artist(s)	Ref.
January 1	Come On Over	Shania Twain	
January 8	Come On Over	Shania Twain	
January 15	Fly	Dixie Chicks	
January 22	Fly	Dixie Chicks	
January 29	Fly	Dixie Chicks	
February 5	Fly	Dixie Chicks	
February 12	Fly	Dixie Chicks	
February 19	Fly	Dixie Chicks	
February 26	Fly	Dixie Chicks	
March 4	Fly	Dixie Chicks	
March 11	Fly	Dixie Chicks	
March 18	Fly	Dixie Chicks	
March 25	Latest Greatest Straitest Hits	George Strait	
April 1	Latest Greatest Straitest Hits	George Strait	
April 8	Fly	Dixie Chicks	
April 15	Fly	Dixie Chicks	
April 22	Fly	Dixie Chicks	
April 29	Fly	Dixie Chicks	
May 6	Fly	Dixie Chicks	
May 13	Fly	Dixie Chicks	
May 20	Fly	Dixie Chicks	
May 27	Fly	Dixie Chicks	
June 3	Fly	Dixie Chicks	
June 10	I Hope You Dance	Lee Ann Womack	
June 17	Fly	Dixie Chicks	
June 24	Fly	Dixie Chicks	
July 1	Fly	Dixie Chicks	
July 8	Fly	Dixie Chicks	
July 15	Fly	Dixie Chicks	
July 22	Fly	Dixie Chicks	
July 29	Fly	Dixie Chicks	
August 5	Fly	Dixie Chicks	
August 12	Fly	Dixie Chicks	
August 19	Burn	Jo Dee Messina	
August 26	Coyote Ugly	Soundtrack	
September 2	Coyote Ugly	Soundtrack	
September 9	Coyote Ugly	Soundtrack	
September 16	Coyote Ugly	Soundtrack	
September 23	Coyote Ugly	Soundtrack	
September 30	Coyote Ugly	Soundtrack	
October 7	George Strait	George Strait	
October 14	Greatest Hits	Kenny Chesney	
October 21	Greatest Hits	Kenny Chesney	
October 28	Breathe	Faith Hill	
November 4	Breathe	Faith Hill	
November 11	Breathe	Faith Hill	
November 18	Breathe	Faith Hill	
November 25	When Somebody Loves You	Alan Jackson	
December 2	When Somebody Loves You	Alan Jackson	
December 9	Greatest Hits	Tim McGraw	
December 16	Greatest Hits	Tim McGraw	
December 23	Greatest Hits	Tim McGraw	
December 30	Greatest Hits	Tim McGraw	
