= 20th Century Masters: The Christmas Collection =

20th Century Masters: The Christmas Collection may refer to:

- 20th Century Masters – The Christmas Collection: The Best of George Strait
- 20th Century Masters – The Christmas Collection: The Best of Reba
