= List of Top Country Albums number ones of 2004 =

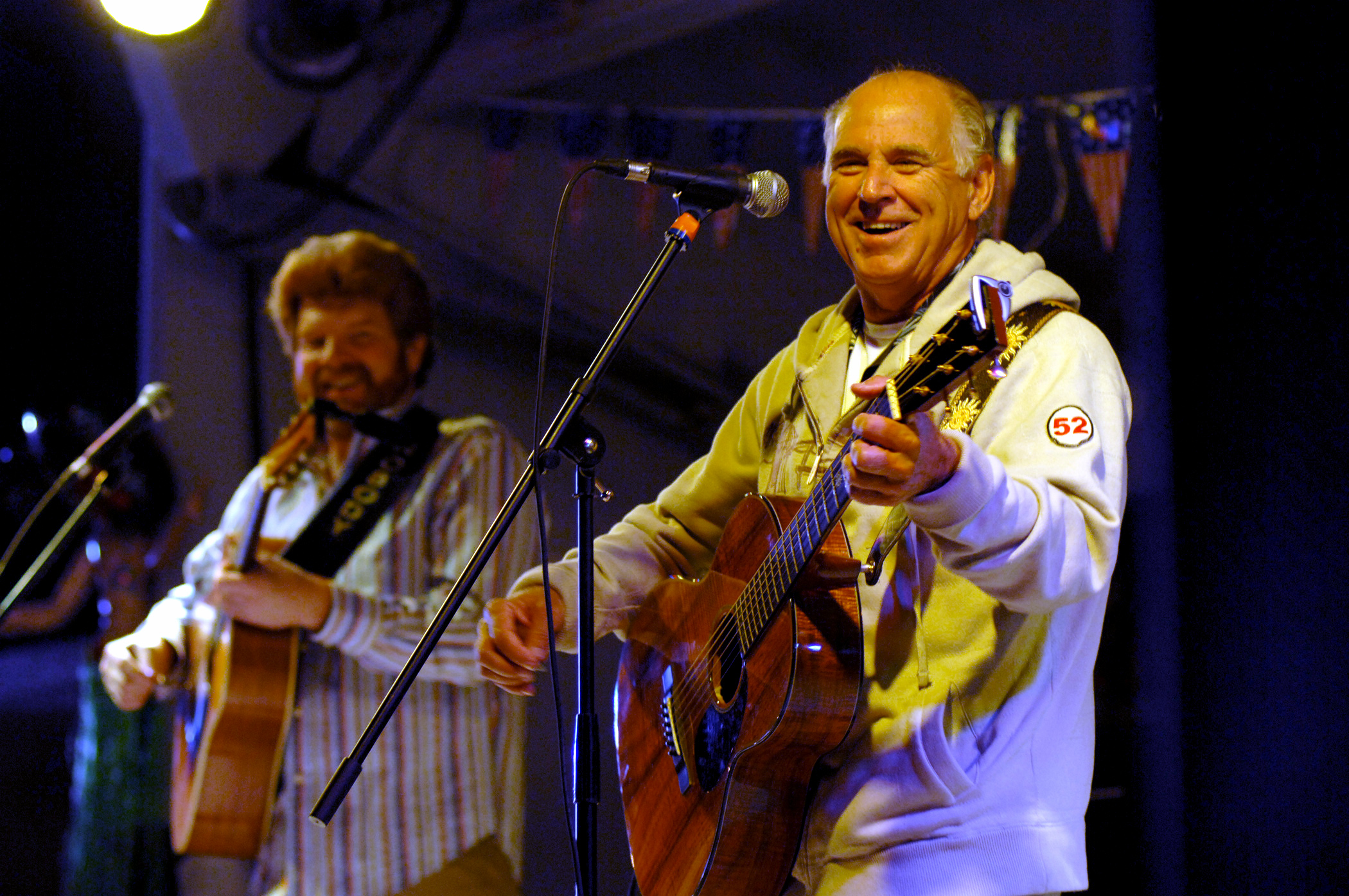
Jimmy Buffett (right) reached number one for the first time, more than 30 years after the release of his debut album.

Top Country Albums is a chart that ranks the top-performing country music albums in the United States, published by Billboard. In 2004, 11 different albums topped the chart, based on electronic point of sale data provided by SoundScan Inc.

In the issue of Billboard dated January 3, Toby Keith was at number one with Shock'n Y'all, the album's seventh week in the top spot. It occupied the top spot for the first seven weeks of 2004 before being displaced by Kenny Chesney's When the Sun Goes Down, which would go on to spend 14 consecutive weeks at number one, the year's longest unbroken run in the top spot. It also meant that Chesney was the act with most weeks at number one during the year; his figure of 14 weeks atop the chart was nearly twice that achieved by any other act. When the Sun Goes Down was one of five of 2004's Top Country Albums number ones to also reach the top spot on the all-genre Billboard 200 listing, along with releases by Jimmy Buffett, Tim McGraw, Alan Jackson and George Strait. The year's final country chart-topper was Greatest Hits by Shania Twain, which held the top spot for the final five weeks of 2004. Following that album's release, Twain, one of the most successful artists in country music history, would take a lengthy hiatus from the music industry and not release an album of new material until 2017.

Four acts reached number one for the first time in 2004. Most notably, in the issue of Billboard dated July 31, Jimmy Buffett gained his first number one with License to Chill after more than 30 years in the music industry. Buffett had first entered the Top Country Albums listing with his major-label debut A White Sport Coat and a Pink Crustacean in 1973 and had placed 10 albums on the chart between then and 1986 without ever reaching number one. After that, although his albums continued to enter the all-genre Billboard 200, he did not return to the country listing until License to Chill entered at number one in July 2004. Gretchen Wilson, Keith Urban, and the duo Big & Rich also reached number one for the first time in 2004 with Here for the Party, Be Here and Horse of a Different Color respectively. Wilson's album recorded the highest first-week sales to date for a debut album by a country musician. In contrast to the first-time chart-toppers, George Strait gained his 19th number one with 50 Number Ones, extending his record for the highest number of chart-toppers in the listing's history.

== Chart history ==
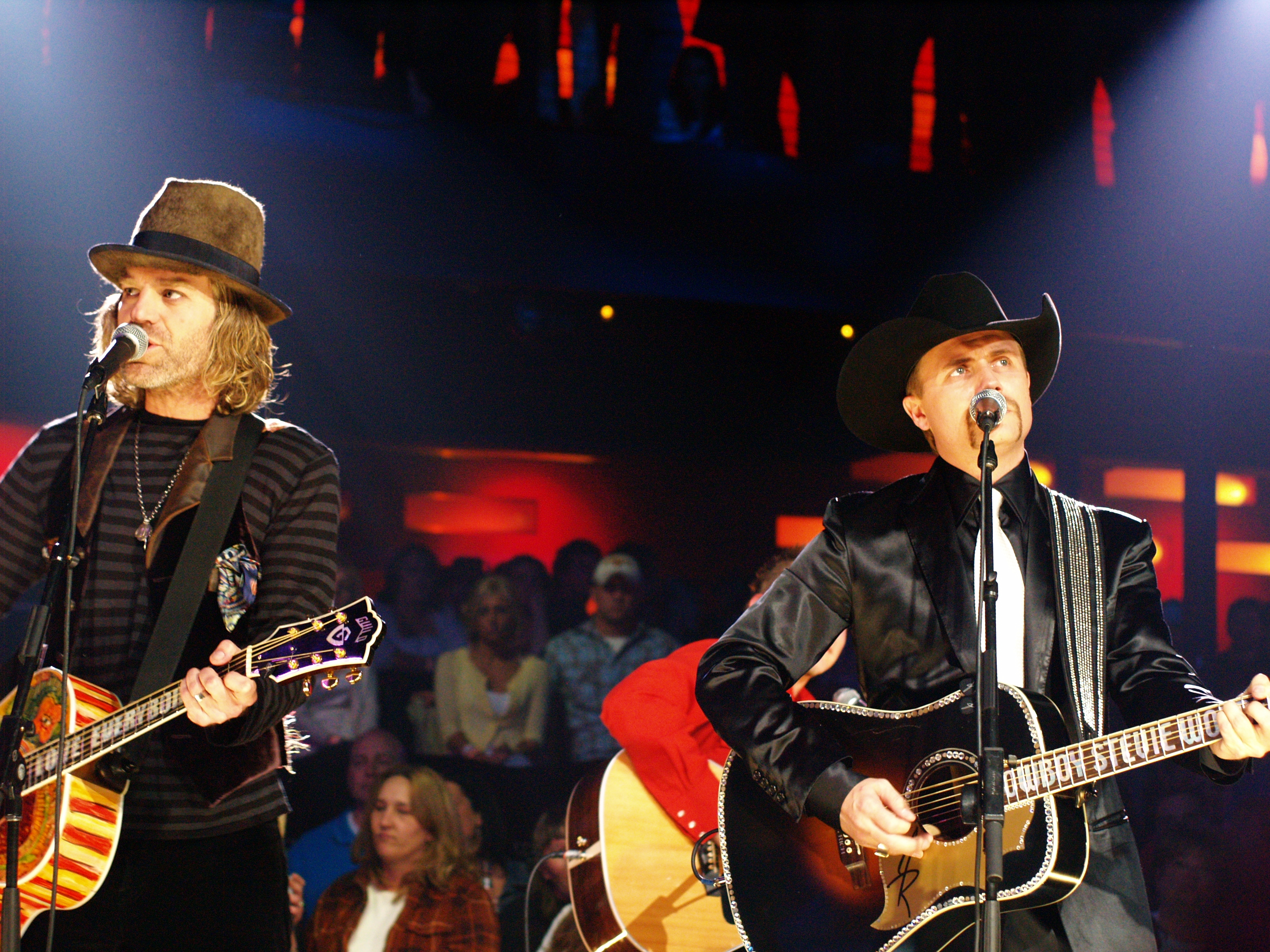
Horse of a Different Color was the first number one for Big & Rich.

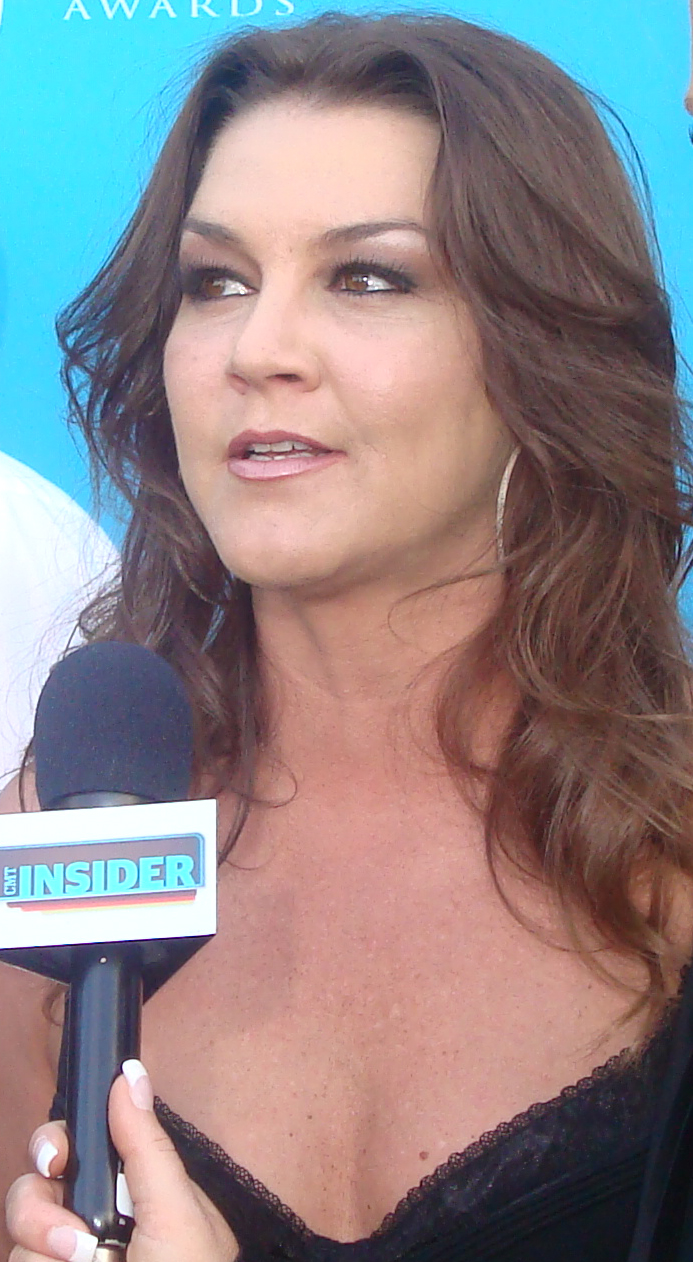
Gretchen Wilson topped the chart with her debut album Here for the Party.

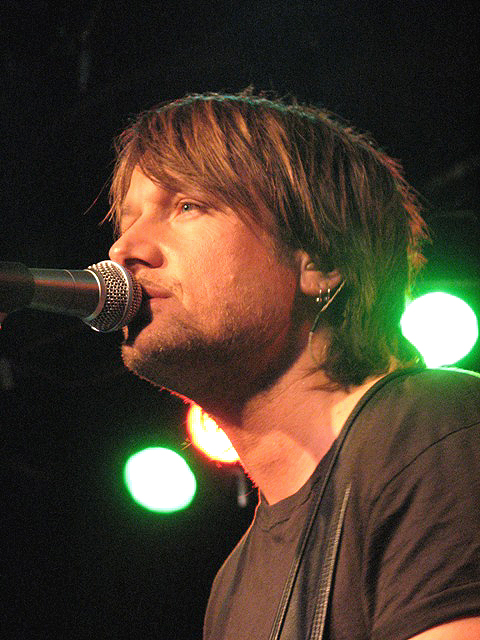
Keith Urban's Be Here was the first number one in the U.S. for the Australian singer.

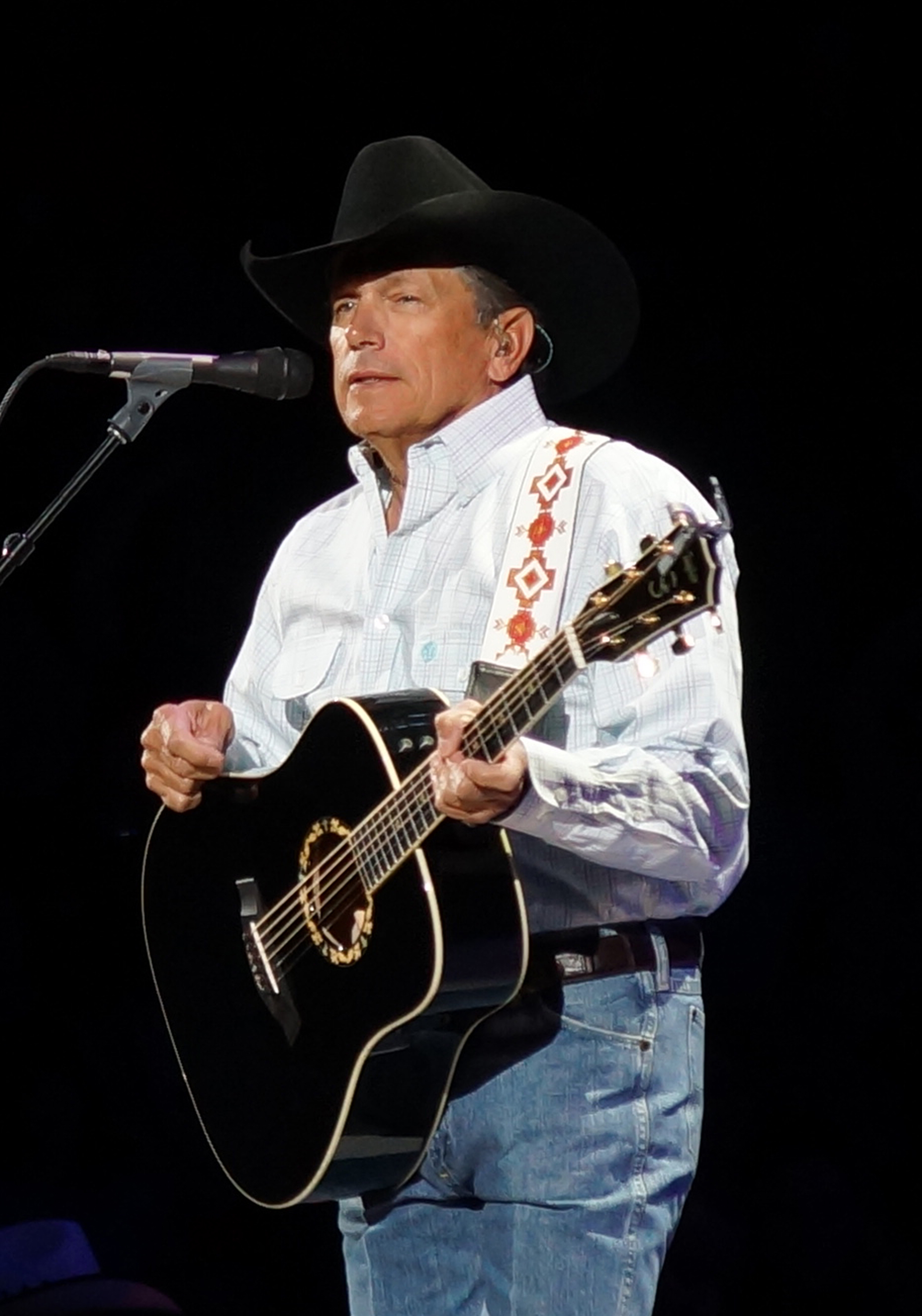
50 Number Ones was the 19th chart-topping album for George Strait, extending his record for the most number-one country albums.

Issue date	Title	Artist(s)	Ref.
January 3	Shock'n Y'all	Toby Keith	
January 10	Shock'n Y'all	Toby Keith	
January 17	Shock'n Y'all	Toby Keith	
January 24	Shock'n Y'all	Toby Keith	
January 31	Shock'n Y'all	Toby Keith	
February 7	Shock'n Y'all	Toby Keith	
February 14	Shock'n Y'all	Toby Keith	
February 21	When the Sun Goes Down	Kenny Chesney	
February 28	When the Sun Goes Down	Kenny Chesney	
March 6	When the Sun Goes Down	Kenny Chesney	
March 13	When the Sun Goes Down	Kenny Chesney	
March 20	When the Sun Goes Down	Kenny Chesney	
March 27	When the Sun Goes Down	Kenny Chesney	
April 3	When the Sun Goes Down	Kenny Chesney	
April 10	When the Sun Goes Down	Kenny Chesney	
April 17	When the Sun Goes Down	Kenny Chesney	
April 24	When the Sun Goes Down	Kenny Chesney	
May 1	When the Sun Goes Down	Kenny Chesney	
May 8	When the Sun Goes Down	Kenny Chesney	
May 15	When the Sun Goes Down	Kenny Chesney	
May 22	When the Sun Goes Down	Kenny Chesney	
May 29	Here for the Party	Gretchen Wilson	
June 5	Here for the Party	Gretchen Wilson	
June 12	Here for the Party	Gretchen Wilson	
June 19	Here for the Party	Gretchen Wilson	
June 26	Here for the Party	Gretchen Wilson	
July 3	Here for the Party	Gretchen Wilson	
July 10	Here for the Party	Gretchen Wilson	
July 17	Here for the Party	Gretchen Wilson	
July 24	Here for the Party	Gretchen Wilson	
July 31	License to Chill	Jimmy Buffett	
August 7	License to Chill	Jimmy Buffett	
August 14	License to Chill	Jimmy Buffett	
August 21	License to Chill	Jimmy Buffett	
August 28	License to Chill	Jimmy Buffett	
September 4	Horse of a Different Color	Big & Rich	
September 11	Live Like You Were Dying	Tim McGraw	
September 18	Live Like You Were Dying	Tim McGraw	
September 25	What I Do	Alan Jackson	
October 2	Live Like You Were Dying	Tim McGraw	
October 9	Be Here	Keith Urban	
October 16	Feels Like Today	Rascal Flatts	
October 23	50 Number Ones	George Strait	
October 30	50 Number Ones	George Strait	
November 6	50 Number Ones	George Strait	
November 13	50 Number Ones	George Strait	
November 20	50 Number Ones	George Strait	
November 27	Greatest Hits	Shania Twain	
December 4	Greatest Hits	Shania Twain	
December 11	Greatest Hits	Shania Twain	
December 18	Greatest Hits	Shania Twain	
December 25	Greatest Hits	Shania Twain	
