= List of Hot Country Singles & Tracks number ones of 1997 =

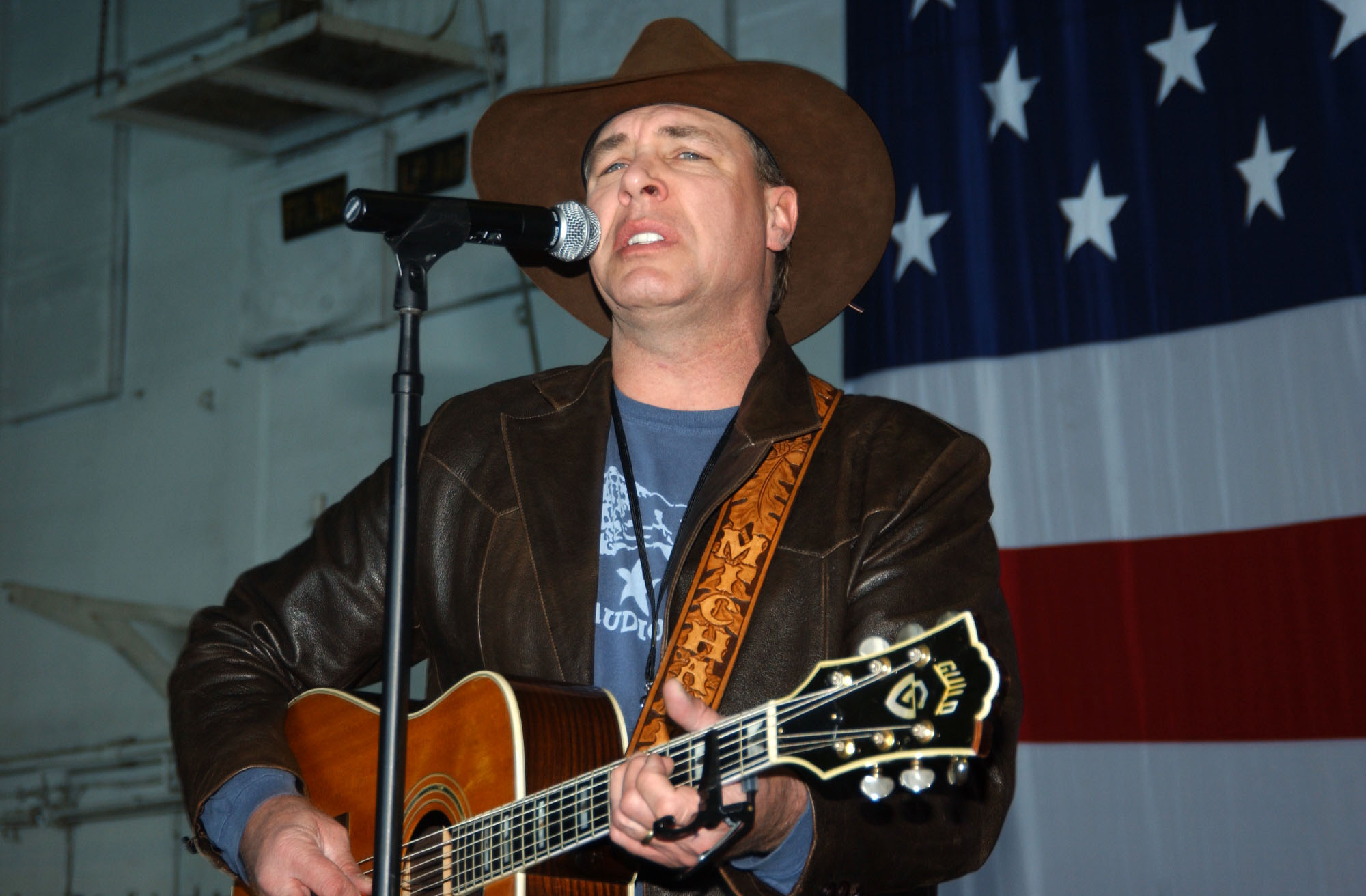
Michael Peterson achieved his only number one in December.

Hot Country Songs is a chart that ranks the top-performing country music songs in the United States, published by Billboard magazine. In 1997, 23 different songs topped the chart, then published under the title Hot Country Singles & Tracks, in 52 issues of the magazine. Chart rankings were based on weekly airplay data from country music radio stations compiled by Nielsen Broadcast Data Systems.

At the start of the year, the number one song was "One Way Ticket (Because I Can)" by LeAnn Rimes, which had reached the top of the chart in the issue of Billboard dated December 28, 1996. It remained at the top for one further week in 1997 before Kevin Sharp began a four-week run at the top with his debut single, a cover version of R&B singer Tony Rich's song "Nobody Knows". This would prove to be the only number-one hit for Sharp, who died in 2014 at age 43. Three other vocalists achieved their first number-one country songs in 1997. Rick Trevino spent one week in the top spot in March with "Running Out of Reasons to Run", which would also prove to be his only number one. Trace Adkins achieved the feat with "(This Ain't) No Thinkin' Thing" in April, and Michael Peterson scored his first and only chart-topper in December with "From Here to Eternity".

George Strait spent the highest number of total weeks at number one with nine, comprising five with "One Night at a Time" and four with "Carrying Your Love with Me". The only other acts to have more than one chart-topper during the year were Deana Carter and Tim McGraw. "It's Your Love", McGraw's duet with his wife Faith Hill, spent six weeks in the top spot, the longest unbroken run of the year. Hill was one of five female vocalists to spend time in the top spot in 1997; during the late 1990s, female performers achieved a level of success on the country charts greater than they had in the first half of the decade or would in the subsequent decade. The final number one of the year was "Longneck Bottle" by Garth Brooks.

== Chart history ==
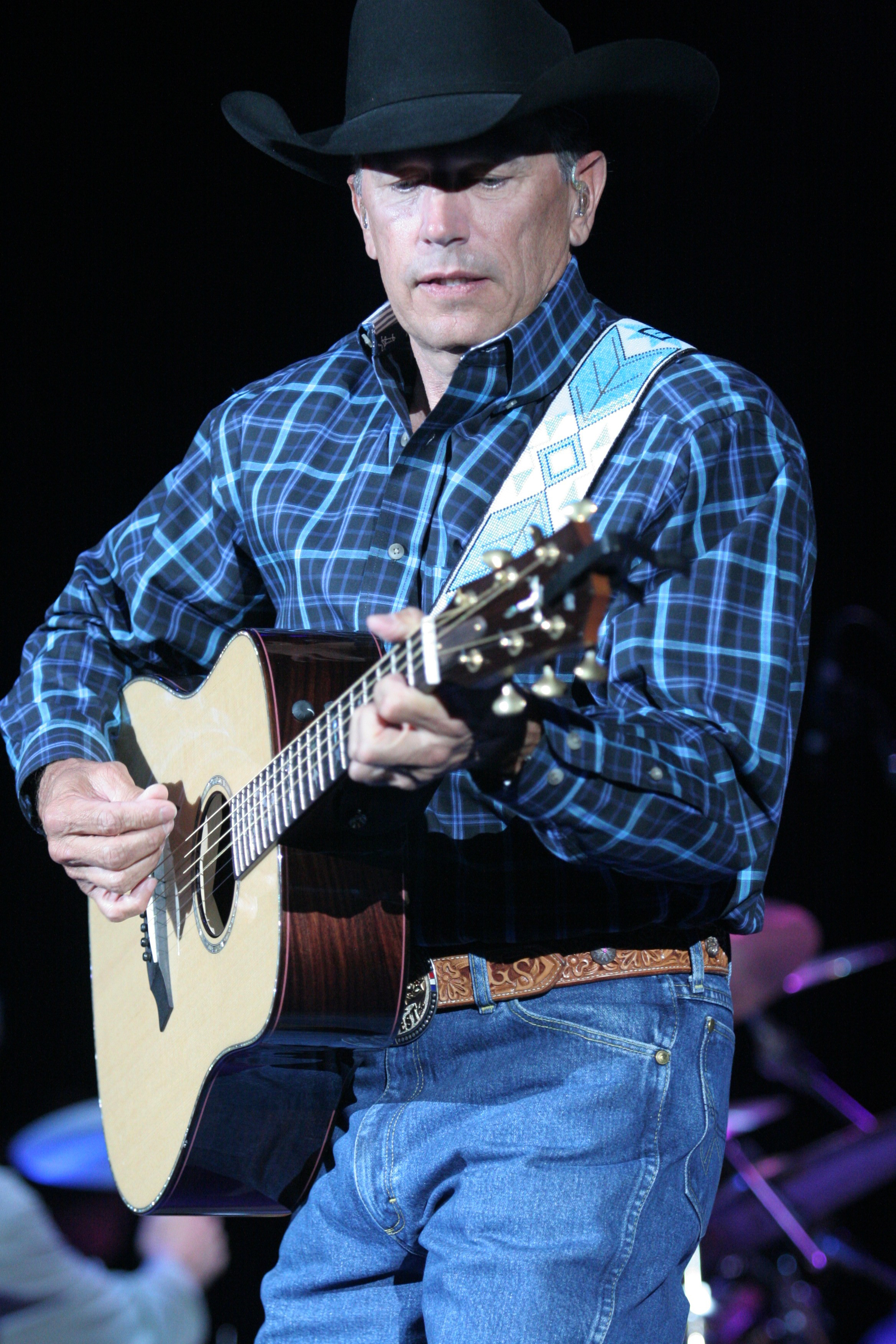
George Strait spent a total of nine weeks at number one.

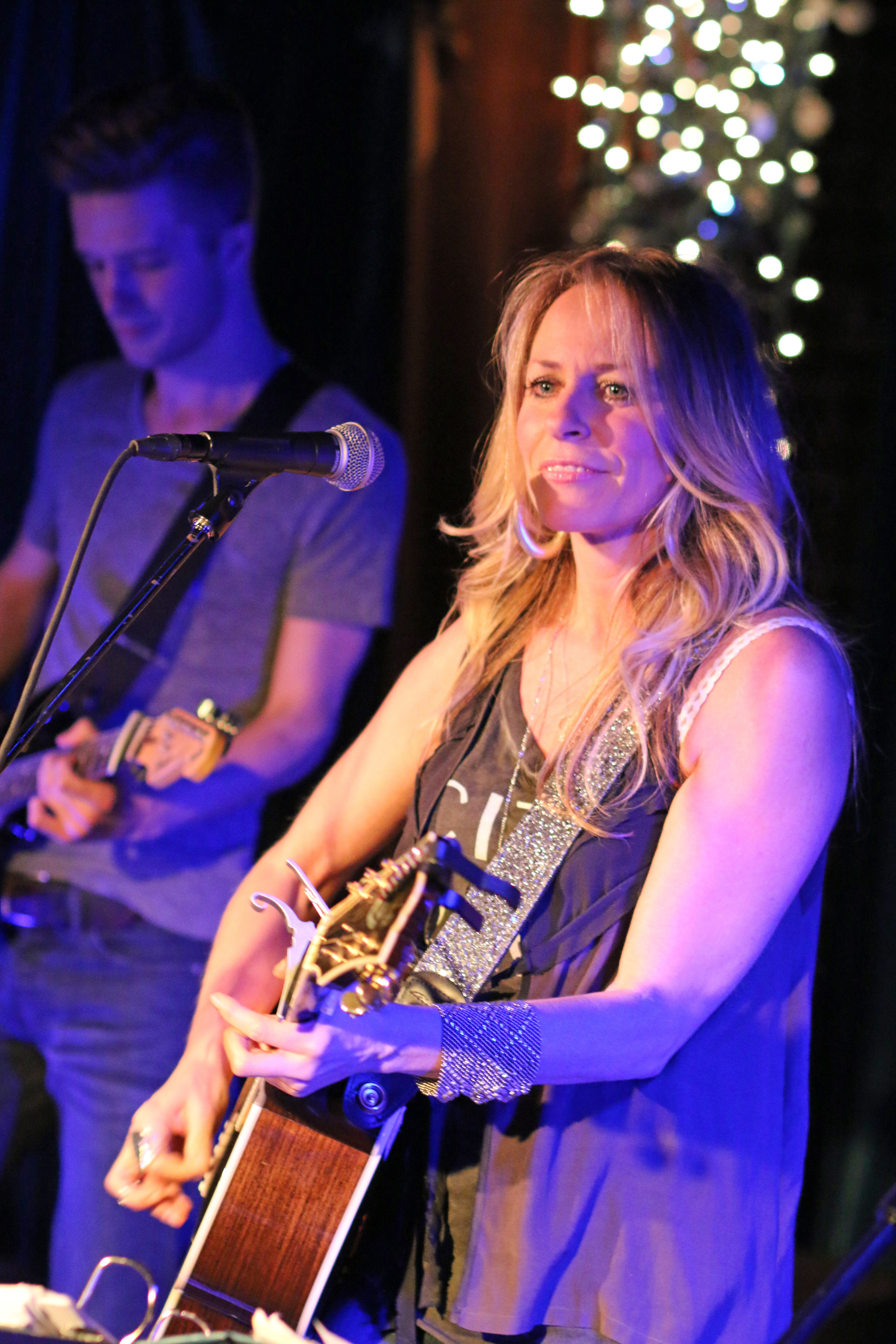
Deana Carter had two number ones in 1997.

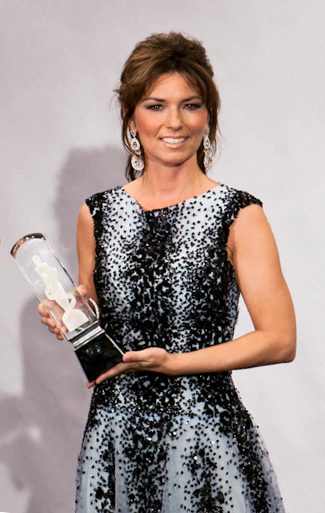
Shania Twain had a five-week run at number one with "Love Gets Me Every Time".

Issue date	Title	Artist(s)	Ref.
January 4	"One Way Ticket (Because I Can)"	LeAnn Rimes	
January 11	"Nobody Knows"	Kevin Sharp	
January 18	"Nobody Knows"	Kevin Sharp	
January 25	"Nobody Knows"	Kevin Sharp	
February 1	"Nobody Knows"	Kevin Sharp	
February 8	"It's a Little Too Late"	Mark Chesnutt	
February 15	"It's a Little Too Late"	Mark Chesnutt	
February 22	"A Man This Lonely"	Brooks & Dunn	
March 1	"Running Out of Reasons to Run"	Rick Trevino	
March 8	"Me Too"	Toby Keith	
March 15	"We Danced Anyway"	Deana Carter	
March 22	"We Danced Anyway"	Deana Carter	
March 29	"How Was I to Know"	Reba McEntire	
April 5	"(This Ain't) No Thinkin' Thing"	Trace Adkins	
April 12	"Rumor Has It"	Clay Walker	
April 19	"Rumor Has It"	Clay Walker	
April 26	"One Night at a Time"	George Strait	
May 3	"One Night at a Time"	George Strait	
May 10	"One Night at a Time"	George Strait	
May 17	"One Night at a Time"	George Strait	
May 24	"One Night at a Time"	George Strait	
May 31	"Sittin' on Go"	Bryan White	
June 7	"It's Your Love"	Tim McGraw (with Faith Hill)	
June 14	"It's Your Love"	Tim McGraw (with Faith Hill)	
June 21	"It's Your Love"	Tim McGraw (with Faith Hill)	
June 28	"It's Your Love"	Tim McGraw (with Faith Hill)	
July 5	"It's Your Love"	Tim McGraw (with Faith Hill)	
July 12	"It's Your Love"	Tim McGraw (with Faith Hill)	
July 19	"Carrying Your Love with Me"	George Strait	
July 26	"Carrying Your Love with Me"	George Strait	
August 2	"Carrying Your Love with Me"	George Strait	
August 9	"Carrying Your Love with Me"	George Strait	
August 16	"Come Cryin' to Me"	Lonestar	
August 23	"Come Cryin' to Me"	Lonestar	
August 30	"She's Got It All"	Kenny Chesney	
September 6	"She's Got It All"	Kenny Chesney	
September 13	"She's Got It All"	Kenny Chesney	
September 20	"There Goes"	Alan Jackson	
September 27	"How Your Love Makes Me Feel"	Diamond Rio	
October 4	"How Your Love Makes Me Feel"	Diamond Rio	
October 11	"How Your Love Makes Me Feel"	Diamond Rio	
October 18	"How Do I Get There"	Deana Carter	
October 25	"Everywhere"	Tim McGraw	
November 1	"Everywhere"	Tim McGraw	
November 8	"Love Gets Me Every Time"	Shania Twain	
November 15	"Love Gets Me Every Time"	Shania Twain	
November 22	"Love Gets Me Every Time"	Shania Twain	
November 29	"Love Gets Me Every Time"	Shania Twain	
December 6	"Love Gets Me Every Time"	Shania Twain	
December 13	"From Here to Eternity"	Michael Peterson	
December 20	"Longneck Bottle"	Garth Brooks	
December 27	"Longneck Bottle"	Garth Brooks	

== See also ==
- 1997 in music
- List of artists who reached number one on the U.S. country chart
