= Tell Me Something Bad About Tulsa =

Single by George Strait

from the album Honkytonkville
- B-side: "As Far as It Goes"
- Released: April 7, 2003
- Genre: Country
- Length: 3:16
- Label: MCA Nashville
- Songwriter: Red Lane
- Producers: Tony Brown; George Strait

George Strait singles chronology
"She'll Leave You with a Smile" (2002)	"Tell Me Something Bad About Tulsa" (2003)	"Cowboys Like Us" (2003)

"Tell Me Something Bad About Tulsa" is a song written by Red Lane. It was first recorded by American country music artist Merle Haggard on his 1986 album, Out Among the Stars. Haggard's son, Noel Haggard, covered the song on his 1997 debut album, One Lifetime, and released it as his second single. It peaked at number 75 on the Billboard Hot Country Singles & Tracks chart in August 1997. Noel Haggard's version was released through Atlantic Records and was produced by Barry Beckett.

George Strait also recorded a version of the song for his 2003 album, Honkytonkville. Released as the album's first single, Strait's rendition peaked at number 11 on the Billboard Hot Country Singles & Tracks chart in July 2003.

== Chart performance ==
=== Noel Haggard ===
Chart (1997)	Peak position
US Hot Country Songs (Billboard)	75

=== George Strait ===
"Tell Me Something Bad About Tulsa" debuted at number 48 on the U.S. Billboard Hot Country Singles & Tracks for the week of April 12, 2003.

Chart (2003)	Peak position
US Hot Country Songs (Billboard)	11
US Billboard Hot 100	69

==== Year-end charts ====
Chart (2003)	Position
US Country Songs (Billboard)	49
