= What Do You Say to That =

Single by George Strait

from the album Always Never the Same
- Released: July 26, 1999
- Recorded: 1999
- Genre: Country
- Length: 3:04
- Label: MCA Nashville
- Songwriters: Jim Lauderdale, Melba Montgomery
- Producers: Tony Brown; George Strait

George Strait singles chronology
"Write This Down" (1999)	"What Do You Say to That" (1999)	"The Best Day" (2000)

"What Do You Say to That" is a song written by Jim Lauderdale and Melba Montgomery. It was recorded by Lauderdale on his 1997 album, Whisper. In 1999, it was recorded by both David Ball on his album Play, and by George Strait on his album Always Never the Same. Strait's version was released in July 1999 as the third and final single from this album. It peaked at number 4 in the United States, and number 2 in Canada.

== Critical reception ==
Larry Flick, of Billboard magazine reviewed the song favorably, calling it a "lovely little tune with a pretty melody and a positive lyric." He goes on by saying that the production incorporates "sweet, understated fiddle and piano that interplay nicely with Strait's eloquent vocal performance."

== Chart positions ==
"What Do You Say to That" re-entered the U.S. Billboard Hot Country Singles & Tracks chart at number 67 as an official single for the week of July 31, 1999.

Chart (1999)	Peak position
Canada Country Singles (RPM)	2
US Billboard Hot 100	45
US Hot Country Songs (Billboard)	4

=== Year-end charts ===
Chart (1999)	Position
Canada Country Tracks (RPM)	77
US Country Songs (Billboard)	35
