= Murder on Music Row =

2000 song performed by George Strait

"Murder on Music Row" is a 1999 song written by Larry Cordle and Larry Shell, and originally recorded by American bluegrass group Larry Cordle & Lonesome Standard Time, as the title track from their album Murder on Music Row. It gained fame soon after that when it was recorded as a duet between American country music artists George Strait and Alan Jackson. The song laments the rise of country pop and the accompanying decline of the traditional country music sound; it refers to Music Row, an area in Nashville, Tennessee considered the epicenter of the country music industry.

Although the Strait/Jackson version was not released officially as a single, it received enough unsolicited airplay to reach number 38 on the Billboard Hot Country Singles & Tracks chart.

The original Larry Cordle version was awarded the Song of the Year award at the 2000 International Bluegrass Music Awards.

== Content ==
"Murder on Music Row" is a lament and criticism of the ongoing trend of country pop crossover acts and pop influences on country music, a trend that has pushed traditional and neotraditional country music (and those who perform it) to the periphery. The lyrics metaphorically compare the pop trend to "an awful murder down on Music Row", and lament that "The steel guitar no longer cries and fiddles barely play / But drums and rock and roll guitars are mixed up in your face." In addition, the song also states that older traditional country artists "wouldn't stand a chance on today's radio," citing by nickname Hank Williams ("Old Hank"), Merle Haggard ("The Hag"), and George Jones ("The Possum").

== George Strait/Alan Jackson version ==
"Murder on Music Row"

Song by George Strait with Alan Jackson

from the album Latest Greatest Straitest Hits
- Released: March 7, 2000
- Recorded: October 27, 1999
- Genre: Neotraditional country
- Length: 4:23
- Label: MCA Nashville
- Songwriters: Larry Cordle, Larry Shell
- Producers: Tony Brown; George Strait

The song was covered by country music artists George Strait and Alan Jackson. The two singers originally performed the song together at the 1999 Country Music Association Awards show.; Strait and Jackson later recorded it for 2000's Latest Greatest Straitest Hits album. The studio version, although never released officially as a single, reached number 38 on the Hot Country Songs chart from unsolicited play and served as the B-side to Strait's late-2000 single "Go On". In 2000, it also received the Country Music Association's award for Vocal Event of the Year, as well as the CMA's Song of the Year award a year later. Alan Jackson and George Strait again paired up to perform the song on June 7, 2014, during his final concert for "The Cowboy Rides Away Tour" at AT&T Stadium.

=== Chart performance ===
Chart (2000)	Peak position
Canada Country Singles (RPM)	47
US Hot Country Songs (Billboard)	38

== Dierks Bentley/George Jones version ==
In 2006, Dierks Bentley and George Jones recorded a version of the song that was included on the album Songs of the Year 2007, which was only available in Cracker Barrel restaurants.

== Parody ==
Country comedy artist Cledus T. Judd parodied the song as "Merger on Music Row", in a duet with Daryle Singletary, on his 2009 album Polyrically Uncorrect; the song lamented that music piracy had taken all the profits away from country music.
