= One Step at a Time (album) =

Studio album by George Strait
- Released: April 21, 1998
- Recorded: September 1997
- Studio: Emerald Sound Studios and Masterfonics (Nashville, TN).
- Genre: Neotraditional country
- Length: 38:18
- Label: MCA Nashville
- Producer: Tony Brown; George Strait

George Strait chronology
Carrying Your Love with Me (1997)	One Step at a Time (1998)	Always Never the Same (1999)

Singles from One Step at a Time
- 1. "I Just Want to Dance with You" Released: April 13, 1998; 2. "True" Released: June 22, 1998; 3. "We Really Shouldn't Be Doing This" Released: September 8, 1998

Professional ratings
Review scores
Source	Rating
AllMusic	4/5 stars
Chicago Tribune	(favorable)
Entertainment Weekly	B+

One Step at a Time is the eighteenth studio album by the American country music singer George Strait, released in 1998 on MCA Nashville Records. The album produced the singles "I Just Want to Dance with You", "True", and "We Really Shouldn't Be Doing This", which respectively reached No. 1, No. 2, and No. 4 on the Billboard Hot Country Singles & Tracks (now Hot Country Songs) charts in 1998.

== Musical style and composition ==
One Step at a Time has been described as a neotraditional country album, with elements of pop.

== Track listing ==
No.	Title	Writer(s)	Length
1.	"I Just Want to Dance with You"	Roger Cook, John Prine	3:30
2.	"One Step at a Time"	Earl Clark, Luke Reed	4:06
3.	"True"	Marv Green, Jeff Stevens	3:34
4.	"Remember the Alamo"	Gordon Kennedy, Wayne Kirkpatrick	4:31
5.	"Maria"	Robert Earl Keen	4:39
6.	"We Really Shouldn't Be Doing This"	Jim Lauderdale	2:31
7.	"Why Not Now"	Steve Bogard, Stevens	3:21
8.	"That's the Breaks"	Dean Dillon, Royce Porter	3:39
9.	"Neon Row"	Jimmy Jay, Donny Kees	4:41
10.	"You Haven't Left Me Yet"	Dana Hunt Black, Kent Robbins	3:46

== Personnel ==
- George Strait – lead vocals, acoustic guitar
- Steve Nathan – acoustic piano, Wurlitzer electric piano, synthesizers, accordion
- Steve Gibson – electric guitars, acoustic guitar
- Brent Mason – electric guitars, acoustic guitar, gut-string guitar
- Biff Watson – acoustic guitar, high-third guitar
- Paul Franklin – steel guitar, pedabro
- Glenn Worf – bass guitar, upright bass
- Eddie Bayers – drums
- Stuart Duncan – fiddle
- Liana Manis – backing vocals
- Curtis Young – backing vocals

=== Production ===
- Tony Brown – producer
- George Strait – producer
- Chuck Ainlay – recording, mixing
- Mark Ralston – second engineer
- Russ Martin – additional engineer
- Don Cobb – digital editing
- Carlos Grier – digital editing
- Denny Purcell – mastering
- Georgetown Masters (Nashville, Tennessee) – editing and mastering location
- Jessie Noble – project coordinator
- Katie Gillon – art direction
- Jerry Joyner – design
- Mark Tucker – photography
- Erv Woolsey – management

== Charts ==
=== Weekly charts ===
Chart (1998)	Peak position
Canadian Albums (RPM)	23
Canadian Country Albums (RPM)	3
US Billboard 200	2
US Top Country Albums (Billboard)	1

=== Year-end charts ===
Chart (1998)	Position
US Billboard 200	70
US Top Country Albums (Billboard)	12
Chart (1999)	Position
US Top Country Albums (Billboard)	43

== Certifications ==
Certifications for One Step at a Time
Region	Certification	Certified units/sales
Canada (Music Canada)	Gold	50,000^{^}
United States (RIAA)	2× Platinum	2,000,000^{^}
^{^} Shipments figures based on certification alone.
