= Carrying Your Love with Me =

Studio album by George Strait
- Released: April 22, 1997
- Recorded: September 1996
- Studio: Emerald Sound Studios and Masterfonics (Nashville, TN).
- Genre: Neotraditional country
- Length: 33:03
- Label: MCA Nashville
- Producer: Tony Brown; George Strait

George Strait chronology
Blue Clear Sky (1996)	Carrying Your Love with Me (1997)	One Step at a Time (1998)

Singles from Carrying Your Love with Me
- 1. "One Night at a Time" Released: March 10, 1997; 2. "Carrying Your Love with Me" Released: May 22, 1997; 3. "Today My World Slipped Away" Released: August 29, 1997; 4. "Round About Way" Released: January 5, 1998

Professional ratings
Review scores
Source	Rating
AllMusic	3/5 stars
Chicago Tribune	3/4 stars
Entertainment Weekly	B
Country Standard Time	Favorable

Carrying Your Love with Me is the seventeenth studio album by the American country music artist George Strait, released in 1997. It was released by MCA Nashville and it produced four singles for Strait on the Billboard country charts. "One Night at a Time", the title track, and "Round About Way", respectively the first, second, and fourth singles, all reached Number One, while "Today My World Slipped Away" (a cover of a Vern Gosdin song) reached #3. Eddie Kilgallon, then a member of the band Ricochet, co-wrote "One Night at a Time". The album has been certified 3× Multi-Platinum by the RIAA for shipping three million copies in the U.S. "Carrying Your Love with Me" was nominated for Best Country Album at the 1998 Grammy Awards.

The song "She'll Leave You with a Smile" is not to be confused with another song with the same name which Strait recorded on his 2001 album The Road Less Traveled. This latter song, which was written by Odie Blackmon and Jay Knowles, was released by Strait in 2002, and became a Number One for him that year.

== Musical style and composition ==
Carrying Your Love with Me has been described as a neotraditional country album, with elements of honky-tonk and bluegrass.

== Track listing ==
No.	Title	Writer(s)	Length
1.	"Round About Way"	Steve Dean, Wil Nance	3:05
2.	"Carrying Your Love with Me"	Jeff Stevens, Steve Bogard	3:50
3.	"One Night at a Time"	Roger Cook, Eddie Kilgallon, Earl Bud Lee	3:49
4.	"She'll Leave You with a Smile"	Jackson Leap	3:06
5.	"Won't You Come Home (And Talk to a Stranger)"	Wayne Kemp	2:49
6.	"Today My World Slipped Away"	Mark Wright, Vern Gosdin	3:14
7.	"I've Got a Funny Feeling"	Harlan Howard, Leap	3:00
8.	"The Nerve"	Bobby Braddock	4:06
9.	"That's Me (Every Chance I Get)"	Mark D. Sanders, Ed Hill	2:16
10.	"A Real Good Place to Start"	Dean Dillon, Gary Nicholson	3:53

== Personnel ==
- George Strait – lead vocals, acoustic guitar
- Steve Nathan – Hammond B3 organ
- Matt Rollings – acoustic piano
- Steve Gibson – acoustic guitar, electric guitars
- Brent Mason – electric guitars, acoustic guitar, gut-string guitar
- Biff Watson – acoustic guitar
- Paul Franklin – steel guitar
- Stuart Duncan – fiddle, mandolin
- Glenn Worf – bass guitar
- Eddie Bayers – drums
- Nashville String Machine – strings (4, 6, 8)
- Michael Omartian – string arrangements (4, 8), string conductor (4, 6, 8)
- Bergen White – string arrangements (6)
- Liana Manis – backing vocals
- Curtis Young – backing vocals

=== Production ===
- Tony Brown – producer
- George Strait – producer
- Steve Marcantonio – recording
- Chris Davie – second engineer
- Chuck Ainlay – mixing
- Mark Ralston – mix assistant
- Don Cobb – digital editing
- Carlos Grier – digital editing
- Denny Purcell – mastering
- Georgetown Masters (Nashville, Tennessee) – editing and mastering location
- Jessie Noble – project coordinator
- Katie Gillon – art direction
- Virginia Team – art direction
- Chris Ferrara – design
- Mike Rutherford – photography
- Debra Wingo – grooming
- Erv Woolsey – management

== Charts ==
=== Weekly charts ===
Weekly chart performance for Carrying Your Love with Me
Chart (1997)	Peak position
Australian Albums (ARIA)	45
Canadian Albums (RPM)	28
Canadian Country Albums (RPM)	1
US Billboard 200	1
US Top Country Albums (Billboard)	1

=== Year-end charts ===
1997 year-end chart performance for Carrying Your Love with Me
Chart (1997)	Position
US Billboard 200	24
US Top Country Albums (Billboard)	4

1998 year-end chart performance for Carrying Your Love with Me
Chart (1998)	Position
US Billboard 200	172
US Top Country Albums (Billboard)	19

== Certifications ==
Certifications for Carrying Your Love with Me
Region	Certification	Certified units/sales
Canada (Music Canada)	Gold	50,000^{^}
United States (RIAA)	3× Platinum	3,000,000^{^}
^{^} Shipments figures based on certification alone.
