= Round About Way =

Single by George Strait

from the album Carrying Your Love with Me
- B-side: "She'll Leave You with a Smile"
- Released: January 5, 1998
- Recorded: September 28, 1996
- Genre: Honky-tonk; Western swing
- Length: 3:05 (album version); 2:50 (single edit)
- Label: MCA Nashville
- Songwriters: Steve Dean, Wil Nance
- Producers: Tony Brown, George Strait

George Strait singles chronology
"Today My World Slipped Away" (1997)	"Round About Way" (1998)	"I Just Want to Dance with You" (1998)

"Round About Way" is a song written by Steve Dean and Wil Nance, and recorded by the American country music singer George Strait. It was released in January 1998 as the fourth and final single from his CD Carrying Your Love With Me. The song reached No. 1 on Billboard’s Hot Country Singles & Tracks chart.

The song's B-side, "She'll Leave You with a Smile", is a different song from the single "She'll Leave You with a Smile", included on Strait's album The Road Less Traveled.

== Musical style and composition ==
"Round About Way" is a honky-tonk and Western swing song dominated by its fiddle and pedal steel guitar instrumentation.

== Critical reception ==
Larry Flick, of Billboard magazine, reviewed the song favorably, saying that "fiddle and steel guitar dominate this uptempo romp." He goes on to say that Strait's performance is "packed with personality."

== Chart positions ==
"Round About Way" re-entered the U.S. Billboard Hot Country Singles & Tracks as an official single at number 45 for the week of January 10, 1998.

Chart (1998)	Peak position
Canada Country Singles (RPM)	1
US Hot Country Songs (Billboard)	1

=== Year-end charts ===
Chart (1998)	Position
Canada Country Tracks (RPM)	38
US Country Songs (Billboard)	44
