= 20th Century Masters – The Christmas Collection: The Best of George Strait =

20th Century Masters: The Best of George Strait – The Christmas Collection

Greatest hits album by George Strait
- Released: September 23, 2003
- Genre: Country
- Length: 34:30
- Label: MCA Nashville
- Producer: Jimmy Bowen; Tony Brown; George Strait

George Strait chronology
Honkytonkville (2003)	20th Century Masters: The Best of George Strait – The Christmas Collection (2003)	50 Number Ones (2004)

20th Century Masters – The Christmas Collection: The Best of George Strait is a collection of some of George Strait's greatest Christmas songs. It was released on September 23, 2003, by MCA Nashville.

== Track listing ==
No.	Title	Writer(s)	Length
1.	"Merry Christmas Strait to You"	Bob Kelly	2:39
2.	"When It's Christmas Time in Texas"	Benny McArthur	3:09
3.	"I Know What I Want for Christmas"	Charlie Black, Dana Hunt	3:22
4.	"Old Time Christmas"	Aaron Barker, John Jarvis	3:17
5.	"Santa's on His Way"	David Anthony	2:07
6.	"Let It Snow! Let It Snow! Let It Snow!"	Sammy Cahn, Jule Styne	2:20
7.	"Jingle Bell Rock"	Joe Beal, Jim Boothe	2:13
8.	"All I Want for Christmas (Is My Two Front Teeth)"	Donald Gardner	2:36
9.	"Merry Christmas (Wherever You Are)"	Jerry Laseter, Mack Vickery	3:00
10.	"Noel Leon"	Mike Geiger, Woody Mullis, Ricky Ray Rector	2:54
11.	"Rudolph the Red-Nosed Reindeer"	Johnny Marks	2:55
12.	"The Christmas Song"	Mel Tormé, Bob Wells	3:58
Total length:			34:30

== Critical reception ==
Professional ratings
Review scores
Source	Rating
Allmusic	3/5 stars

20th Century Masters – The Christmas Collection: The Best of George Strait received three out of five stars from William Ruhlmann of Allmusic. In his review, Ruhlmann laments that "this compilation is not what it might have been" because "Strait seems intent on rewarding his current crop of contributing songwriters by including plenty of their mediocre contributions to the Christmas repertoire."

== Chart positions ==
20th Century Masters – The Christmas Collection: The Best of George Strait peaked at number 60 on the U.S. Billboard Top Country Albums chart.

Chart (2003)	Peak position
U.S. Billboard Top Country Albums	60
Chart (2015)	Peak position
Canadian Albums (Billboard)	93
