= I Hate Everything =

2004 song by George Strait

Single by George Strait

from the album 50 Number Ones
- B-side: "Desperately"
- Released: July 5, 2004
- Genre: Country
- Length: 3:55
- Label: MCA Nashville
- Songwriters: Gary Harrison, Keith Stegall
- Producers: Tony Brown, George Strait

George Strait singles chronology
"Hey, Good Lookin'" (2004)	"I Hate Everything" (2004)	"You'll Be There" (2005)

"I Hate Everything" is a song written by Gary Harrison and Keith Stegall, and recorded by American country music singer George Strait. It was released in July 2004 as the lead single from his compilation album, 50 Number Ones. The song reached the top of the Billboard Hot Country Singles & Tracks chart in October 2004 and peaked at number 35 on the Billboard Hot 100.

== Content ==
The protagonist of the song is in a bar and runs into a man who hates everything due to his now ex-wife leaving him for another man. It turns out the protagonist has come into the bar after an argument with his own wife. After he has heard the man's story, he calls his wife and says he is coming home, and they are going to work out their differences. The song ends with the protagonist paying for the man's drinks and thanking him for everything.

== Chart positions ==
"I Hate Everything" debuted at number 41 on the U.S. Billboard Hot Country Singles & Tracks for the week of July 17, 2004.

Chart (2004)	Peak position
Canada Country (Radio & Records)	3
US Hot Country Songs (Billboard)	1
US Billboard Hot 100	35

=== Year-end charts ===
Chart (2004)	Position
US Country Songs (Billboard)	19

== Certifications ==
Region	Certification	Certified units/sales
United States (RIAA)	Gold	500,000^{‡}
^{‡} Sales+streaming figures based on certification alone.
