= Cowboys Like Us =

Single by George Strait

from the album Honkytonkville
- Released: August 11, 2003
- Genre: Outlaw country
- Length: 3:35
- Label: MCA Nashville 12236
- Songwriters: Anthony Smith; Bob DiPiero
- Producers: Tony Brown, George Strait

George Strait singles chronology
"Tell Me Something Bad About Tulsa" (2003)	"Cowboys Like Us" (2003)	"Desperately" (2004)

"Cowboys Like Us" is a song written by Bob DiPiero and Anthony Smith, and recorded by American country music artist George Strait. It was released in August 2003 as the second single from his album Honkytonkville. It reached number 2 on the Billboard Hot Country Singles & Tracks (now Hot Country Songs) charts.

== Content ==
The song is a ballad about cowboys who "ride out on steel horses with wheels" (motorcycles).

== Critical reception ==
Thom Jurek reviewed the song favorably, saying that it could signal a return to outlaw country.

== Chart positions ==
"Cowboys Like Us" debuted at number 57 on the U.S. Billboard Hot Country Singles & Tracks for the week of August 9, 2003. It reached number 2 on the country chart.

Chart (2003)	Peak position
US Hot Country Songs (Billboard)	2
US Billboard Hot 100	38

=== Year-end charts ===
Chart (2003)	Position
US Country Songs (Billboard)	53

== Certifications ==
Region	Certification	Certified units/sales
United States (RIAA)	Gold	500,000^{‡}
^{‡} Sales+streaming figures based on certification alone.
