= Meanwhile (George Strait song) =

1999 single by George Strait

Single by George Strait

from the album Always Never the Same
- Released: January 4, 1999
- Recorded: November 1998
- Genre: Country
- Length: 3:31
- Label: MCA
- Songwriters: Wayland Holyfield; J. Fred Knobloch
- Producers: Tony Brown; George Strait

George Strait singles chronology
"We Really Shouldn't Be Doing This" (1998)	"Meanwhile" (1999)	"Write This Down" (1999)

"Meanwhile" is a song written by Wayland Holyfield and J. Fred Knobloch, and recorded by American country music artist George Strait. It was released in January 1999 as the first single to his album Always Never the Same. It peaked at number 4 on the United States Billboard Hot Country Singles & Tracks chart, while it was a number-one hit on the Canadian RPM Country Tracks chart. It also peaked at number 38 on the U.S. Billboard Hot 100, marking his first Top 40 hit on that chart.

== Critical reception ==
Deborah Evans Price, of Billboard magazine reviewed the song favorably, calling it a "lilting ballad". She goes on to say that "Strait's voice sounds like he's lived every word — the pleasure, the nostalgia, the wistful longing".

== Chart positions ==
"Meanwhile" debuted at number 57 on the U.S. Billboard Hot Country Singles & Tracks for the week of January 9, 1999.

Chart (1999)	Peak position
Canada Country Singles (RPM)	1
US Billboard Hot 100	38
US Hot Country Songs (Billboard)	4

=== Year-end charts ===
Chart (1999)	Position
Canada Country Tracks (RPM)	46
US Country Songs (Billboard)	46
