= Honkytonkville =

Studio album by George Strait
- Released: June 10, 2003
- Recorded: 2002–2003
- Studios: Ocean Way Nashville, Nashville; South Texas Studios; Starstruck Studios, Nashville; Sound Stage Studios, Nashville
- Genre: Honky-tonk
- Length: 41:21
- Label: MCA Nashville
- Producers: Tony Brown; George Strait

George Strait chronology
| For the Last Time: Live from the Astrodome (2003) | Honkytonkville (2003) | 20th Century Masters: The Christmas Collection: The Best of George Strait (2003) |

Singles from Honkytonkville
- 1. "Tell Me Something Bad About Tulsa" Released: April 7, 2003; 2. "Cowboys Like Us" Released: August 11, 2003; 3. "Desperately" Released: January 5, 2004

Professional ratings
Review scores
| Source | Rating |
|---|---|
| About.com | 4/5 stars |
| Allmusic | 4.5/5 stars |
| Chicago Tribune | (average) |
| Country Weekly | (positive) link |
| Entertainment Weekly | A link |
| People | (favorable) link |
| PopMatters | (average) link |

Honkytonkville is the twenty-second studio album by American country music singer George Strait, released on June 10, 2003 by MCA Nashville. One of only a few albums of his career not to produce a Number One single, the album was certified platinum by the RIAA. It produced the singles "Tell Me Something Bad About Tulsa", "Cowboys Like Us" and "Desperately", at #11, #2 and #6 respectively on the country charts. "Honk If You Honky Tonk" also charted at #45 based on unsolicited airplay.

"She Used to Say That to Me" was originally recorded by Rick Trevino on his 1995 album, Looking for the Light. "Tell Me Something Bad About Tulsa" was originally recorded by Merle Haggard on his 1986 album Out Among The Stars. "Desperately" was originally recorded by Bruce Robison on his 1998 album Wrapped.

== Track listing ==
| No. | Title | Writer(s) | Length |
|---|---|---|---|
| 1. | "She Used to Say That to Me" | Jim Lauderdale, John Scott Sherrill | 2:57 |
| 2. | "Honkytonkville" | Buddy Brock, Dean Dillon, Kim Williams | 2:48 |
| 3. | "Look Who's Back from Town" | Dale Dodson, Billy Lawson | 4:04 |
| 4. | "Tell Me Something Bad About Tulsa" | Red Lane | 3:16 |
| 5. | "Cowboys Like Us" | Bob DiPiero, Anthony Smith | 3:39 |
| 6. | "As Far as It Goes" | Tony Colton, Russell Smith | 3:39 |
| 7. | "I Found Jesus on the Jailhouse Floor" | Earl Clark, Greg Hudik | 3:36 |
| 8. | "Desperately" | Bruce Robison, Monte Warden | 4:07 |
| 9. | "Honk If You Honky Tonk" | Dillon, Ken Mellons, John Northrup | 2:14 |
| 10. | "Heaven Is Missing an Angel" | Jerome Earnest, Doug Powell | 4:24 |
| 11. | "Four Down and Twelve Across" | Dillon, Tom Douglas | 2:51 |
| 12. | "My Infinite Love" | Annette Grossberg, Byron Hill, Billy Yates | 3:45 |

== Personnel ==
As listed in liner notes.

=== Musicians ===
- George Strait – lead vocals
- Steve Nathan – keyboards
- Matt Rollings – keyboards
- Steve Gibson – acoustic guitar
- Chris Leuzinger – electric guitars
- Brent Mason – electric guitars, nylon string guitar
- Biff Watson – acoustic guitar
- Paul Franklin – steel guitar
- Stuart Duncan – fiddle, mandolin
- Glenn Worf – bass guitar, upright bass
- Eddie Bayers – drums
- The Nashville String Machine – strings
- Bergen White – string arrangements and conductor
- Carl Gorodetzky – string contractor
- Wes Hightower – background vocals
- Marty Slayton – background vocals

=== Production ===
- Clay Bradley – A&R direction
- Mike Owens – A&R direction
- Tony Brown – producer
- George Strait – producer, additional recording
- Chuck Ainlay – recording, mixing
- John Guess – additional recording
- Lisa Richter – recording assistant
- Jeff Sochor – recording assistant
- Patrick Murphy – additional recording assistant, mix assistant
- Todd Tidwell – additional recording assistant
- Jesse Benfield – mix assistant
- Jim Cooley – mix assistant
- Hank Williams – mastering at MasterMix (Nashville, Tennessee)
- Amy Russell – production coordinator
- Craig Allen – design
- Jim Kemp – art direction
- Tony Baker – photography
- Robin Geary – hair, make-up
- Erv Woolsey – management

== Chart performance ==
=== Weekly charts ===
Weekly chart performance for Honkytonkville
| Chart (2003) | Peak position |
|---|---|
| Australian Albums (ARIA) | 95 |
| US Billboard 200 | 5 |
| US Top Country Albums (Billboard) | 1 |

=== Year-end charts ===
Year-end chart performance for Honkytonkville
| Chart (2003) | Position |
|---|---|
| US Billboard 200 | 147 |
| US Top Country Albums (Billboard) | 18 |
| Chart (2004) | Position |
| US Top Country Albums (Billboard) | 43 |

=== Singles ===
Chart performance for singles from Honkytonkville
| Year | Single | Peak positions | |
| Year | Single | US Country | US |
|---|---|---|---|
| 2003 | "Tell Me Something Bad About Tulsa" | 11 | 69 |
| 2003 | "Cowboys Like Us" | 2 | 38 |
| 2004 | "Desperately" | 6 | 44 |

== Certifications ==
Certifications for Honkytonkville
| Region | Certification | Certified units/sales |
|---|---|---|
| United States (RIAA) | Platinum | 1,000,000^{^} |
^{^} Shipments figures based on certification alone.
