= The Road Less Traveled (George Strait album) =

Studio album by George Strait
- Released: November 6, 2001
- Recorded: 2001
- Studios: Ocean Way Nashville, Sound Stage Studios, Back Stage Studio and Emerald Sound Studios (Nashville, Tennessee).
- Genres: Neotraditional country; Experimental
- Length: 33:47
- Label: MCA Nashville
- Producers: Tony Brown; George Strait

George Strait chronology
George Strait (2000)	The Road Less Traveled (2001)	20th Century Masters – The Millennium Collection: The Best of George Strait (2002)

Singles from The Road Less Traveled
- 1. "Run" Released: September 24, 2001; 2. "Living and Living Well" Released: February 4, 2002; 3. "She'll Leave You with a Smile" Released: September 2, 2002

Professional ratings
Review scores
Source	Rating
AllMusic	3/5 stars
Chicago Tribune	(favorable)
Entertainment Weekly	A−
People	(favorable)
Rolling Stone	(favorable)

The Road Less Traveled is the twenty-first studio album by American country music artist George Strait released by MCA Nashville on November 6, 2001. Certified platinum for sales of one million copies, the album produced the hits "Run", "She'll Leave You with a Smile" and "Living and Living Well", the latter two of which were number 1 hits on the Billboard country charts. "Stars on the Water" and "The Real Thing" also charted at numbers 50 and 60 from unsolicited airplay.

== Content ==
Four of this album's songs are covers: "Stars on the Water" was originally cut by Rodney Crowell on his 1981 album Rodney Crowell; "The Real Thing" by Chip Taylor (as "(I Want) The Real Thing") on his 1973 album Chip Taylor's Last Chance; "Good Time Charley's" by Del Reeves on his 1969 album Down at Good Time Charlie's (as "Good Time Charlie's"); and "My Life's Been Grand" by Merle Haggard on his 1986 album Out Among the Stars. Strait's rendition of "Stars on the Water" features heavy application of Auto-Tune to Strait's vocal track. According to Strait, this was the decision of longtime producer Tony Brown; Strait was initially critical of the technique, but stated that he liked the sound once Brown reduced the amount used.

The song "She'll Leave You with a Smile" is not to be confused with another song with the same name which Strait previously recorded on his 1997 album, Carrying Your Love with Me.

== Track listing ==
No.	Title	Writer(s)	Length
1.	"She'll Leave You with a Smile"	Odie Blackmon, Jay Knowles	2:58
2.	"Run"	Tony Lane, Anthony Smith	4:05
3.	"Stars on the Water"	Rodney Crowell	3:43
4.	"Living and Living Well"	Tony Martin, Mark Nesler, Tom Shapiro	3:38
5.	"The Real Thing"	Chip Taylor	3:33
6.	"Don't Tell Me You're Not in Love"	Tony Colton, Kim Williams, Bobby Wood	3:32
7.	"The Road Less Traveled"	Buddy Brock, Dean Dillon	3:54
8.	"The Middle of Nowhere"	Shawn Camp, John Scott Sherrill	3:14
9.	"Good Time Charley's"	Jerry Chesnut	2:31
10.	"My Life's Been Grand"	Merle Haggard, Terry Gordon	2:38

== Personnel ==
As listed in liner notes.

=== Musicians ===
- George Strait – lead vocals
- Steve Nathan – keyboards
- Steve Conn – accordion
- Steve Gibson – electric guitar
- Chris Leuzinger – electric guitar
- Brent Mason – electric guitar
- Randy Scruggs – acoustic guitars
- Paul Franklin – steel guitar
- Stuart Duncan – fiddle, mandolin
- Michael Rhodes – bass guitar
- Eddie Bayers – drums
- The Nashville String Machine – strings
- Steve Dorff – string arrangements and conductor
- Wes Hightower – backing vocals
- Liana Manis – backing vocals

=== Production ===
- Tony Brown – producer
- George Strait — producer
- Chuck Ainlay – recording, mixing
- David Bryant – recording assistant, overdub recording assistant
- Jeff Socher – mix assistant
- Justin Niebank – overdub recording
- Russ Martin – additional overdub recording
- Tony Green – overdub recording assistant
- Eric Conn – digital editing
- Carlos Grier – digital editing
- Denny Purcell – mastering
- Georgetown Masters (Nashville, Tennessee) – editing and mastering location
- Jessie Noble – project coordinator
- Erv Woolsey – management

=== Design ===
- Tony Baker – photography
- Virginia Team – art direction, additional photography
- Chris Ferrara – design

== Charts ==
=== Weekly charts ===
Chart (2001)	Peak position
US Billboard 200	9
US Top Country Albums (Billboard)	1

=== Year-end charts ===
Chart (2001)	Position
Canadian Country Albums (Nielsen SoundScan)	37
US Top Country Albums (Billboard)	61
Chart (2002)	Position
Canadian Country Albums (Nielsen SoundScan)	47
US Billboard 200	131
US Top Country Albums (Billboard)	12
Chart (2003)	Position
US Top Country Albums (Billboard)	35

== Certifications ==
Certifications for The Road Less Traveled
Region	Certification	Certified units/sales
United States (RIAA)	Platinum	1,000,000^{^}
^{^} Shipments figures based on certification alone.
