= Desperately (Bruce Robison song) =

Single by George Strait

from the album Honkytonkville
- B-side: "Honk If You Honky Tonk"
- Released: January 5, 2004
- Genre: Country
- Length: 4:02
- Label: MCA Nashville (12236)
- Songwriters: Bruce Robison, Monte Warden
- Producers: Tony Brown, George Strait

George Strait singles chronology
| "Cowboys Like Us" (2003) | "Desperately" (2004) | "Hey, Good Lookin'" (2004) |

"Desperately" is a song written by Bruce Robison and Monte Warden. Robison first recorded the song on his 1998 album Wrapped. It was later covered by American country music artist George Strait on his 2003 album Honkytonkville. Released in January 2004 as that album's third and final single, it peaked at number 6 on the Billboard country charts. Its B-side, "Honk If You Honky Tonk", peaked at number 45 based on unsolicited airplay.

== Cover versions ==
The song was covered by Josh Turner featuring Maddie & Tae on Turner's 2020 album Country State of Mind.

== Chart performance ==
"Desperately" debuted at number 56 on the U.S. Billboard Hot Country Singles & Tracks for the week of January 17, 2004.

| Chart (2004) | Peak position |
|---|---|
| Canada Country (Radio & Records) | 5 |
| US Hot Country Songs (Billboard) | 6 |
| US Billboard Hot 100 | 44 |

=== Year-end charts ===
| Chart (2004) | Position |
|---|---|
| US Country Songs (Billboard) | 31 |
