= Always Never the Same (George Strait album) =

Studio album by George Strait
- Released: March 2, 1999
- Recorded: 1998–1999
- Studio: Ocean Way and Sound Stage Studios (Nashville, Tennessee).
- Genre: Neotraditional country
- Length: 32:00
- Label: MCA Nashville
- Producer: Tony Brown; George Strait

George Strait chronology
One Step at a Time (1998)	Always Never the Same (1999)	Merry Christmas Wherever You Are (1999)

Singles from Always Never the Same
- 1. "Meanwhile" Released: January 4, 1999; 2. "Write This Down" Released: March 18, 1999; 3. "What Do You Say to That" Released: July 26, 1999

Professional ratings
Review scores
Source	Rating
Allmusic	3/5 stars
Entertainment Weekly	B+
Q	4/5 stars

Always Never the Same is the nineteenth studio album released on March 2, 1999, by American country music singer George Strait. The album produced the singles "Meanwhile", "Write This Down", and "What Do You Say to That", which respectively reached #4, #1, and #4 on the Billboard Hot Country Singles & Tracks (now Hot Country Songs) charts in 1999. The title track, "One of You" and "I Look at You" also charted in the lower regions of that chart from unsolicited airplay.

== Track listing ==
No.	Title	Writer(s)	Length
1.	"Meanwhile"	Wayland Holyfield, J. Fred Knobloch	3:31
2.	"Write This Down"	Dana Hunt Black, Kent Robbins	3:39
3.	"That's the Truth"	Steve Leslie, Melba Montgomery	3:19
4.	"What Do You Say to That"	Jim Lauderdale, Montgomery	3:00
5.	"Peace of Mind"	Aaron Barker, Dean Dillon	3:13
6.	"That's Where I Wanna Take Our Love"	Hank Cochran, Dillon	3:14
7.	"Always Never the Same"	Marv Green, Terry McBride	2:58
8.	"One of You"	Kostas, Lauderdale	2:30
9.	"I Look at You"	Steve Bogard, Jeff Stevens	3:28
10.	"4 Minus 3 Equals Zero"	Lonnie Williams	3:08

== Personnel ==
As listed in liner notes.

=== Musicians ===
- George Strait – lead vocals
- Steve Nathan – acoustic piano, Wurlitzer electric piano
- Steve Gibson – electric guitars, acoustic guitar
- Brent Mason – electric guitars, acoustic guitar
- Randy Scruggs – acoustic guitar (1, 4)
- Paul Franklin – steel guitar
- Glenn Worf – bass guitar
- Eddie Bayers – drums
- Stuart Duncan – fiddle
- Nashville String Machine – strings
- Bergen White – string arrangements and conductor
- Liana Manis – backing vocals
- Curtis Young – backing vocals

=== Production ===
- Tony Brown – producer
- George Strait – producer
- Chuck Ainlay – recording
- Mark Ralston – second engineer
- Russ Martin – overdubs
- Justin Niebank – overdubs
- Tony Green – second overdub engineer
- Tim Waters – second overdub engineer
- Don Cobb – digital editing
- Carlos Grier – digital editing
- Denny Purcell – mastering
- Georgetown Masters (Nashville, TN) – editing and mastering location
- Jessie Noble – project coordinator
- Erv Woolsey – management

=== Design ===
- Virginia Team – art direction
- Chris Ferrara – design
- Kevin Cruff – photography
- Mark Tucker – photography

== Charts ==
=== Weekly charts ===
Chart (1999)	Peak position
Canadian Albums (RPM)	73
Canadian Country Albums (RPM)	2
US Billboard 200	6
US Top Country Albums (Billboard)	2

=== Year-end charts ===
Chart (1999)	Position
US Billboard 200	105
US Top Country Albums (Billboard)	10

== Certifications ==
Certifications for Always Never the Same
Region	Certification	Certified units/sales
Canada (Music Canada)	Gold	50,000^{^}
United States (RIAA)	Platinum	1,000,000^{^}
^{^} Shipments figures based on certification alone.
