= Run (George Strait song) =

Single by George Strait

from the album The Road Less Traveled
- B-side: "The Real Thing"
- Released: September 24, 2001
- Recorded: 2001
- Genre: Progressive country; neotraditional country
- Length: 4:05 (album version); 3:46 (single edit)
- Label: MCA Nashville
- Songwriters: Tony Lane; Anthony Smith
- Producers: Tony Brown; George Strait

George Strait singles chronology
"If You Can Do Anything Else" (2001)	"Run" (2001)	"Living and Living Well" (2002)

"Run" is a song written by Anthony Smith and Tony Lane, and recorded by American country music artist George Strait. It was released in September 2001 as the lead single from Strait's album The Road Less Traveled. A live version featuring Miranda Lambert was included on The Cowboy Rides Away: Live from AT&T Stadium, which was released in 2014. Lambert and Strait later performed the song at the 54th Academy of Country Music Awards.

== Critical reception ==
Chuck Taylor in his review of the single for Billboard Magazine called the song's production "intriguing" and that Strait's "warm vocals weave through a haunting melody." He said that there is a progressive feel to the track but the mandolin and steel guitar keep it traditional.

== Commercial performance ==
"Run" debuted at number 36 on the U.S. Billboard Hot Country Singles & Tracks for the chart week of October 13, 2001. The song reached number 2 on the Billboard Hot Country Songs charts in December 2001, where it was blocked by Toby Keith's "I Wanna Talk About Me". It then reached number 2 again in early January 2002, where it was blocked by Alan Jackson's "Where Were You (When the World Stopped Turning)", and again in early February of the same year, being blocked by Steve Holy's "Good Morning Beautiful". It also peaked at number 34 on the Billboard Hot 100. The song has sold 390,000 copies in the United States as of April 2019.

The song's b-side, "The Real Thing", was later the b-side to the album's next single, "Living and Living Well". Although not released as a single itself, "The Real Thing" charted at number 60 for the country chart dated March 22, 2003.

== Charts ==
Chart (2001–2002)	Peak position
US Hot Country Songs (Billboard)	2
US Billboard Hot 100	34

=== Year-end charts ===
Chart (2002)	Position
US Country Songs (Billboard)	30

== Certifications ==
Certifications for Run
Region	Certification	Certified units/sales
United States (RIAA)	Platinum	1,000,000^{‡}
^{‡} Sales+streaming figures based on certification alone.
