= The Best Day (George Strait song) =

2000 single by George Strait

Single by George Strait

from the album Latest Greatest Straitest Hits
- Released: January 3, 2000
- Recorded: August 31, 1999
- Genre: Country
- Length: 3:24
- Label: MCA Nashville
- Songwriters: Dean Dillon; Carson Chamberlain
- Producers: Tony Brown; George Strait

George Strait singles chronology
"What Do You Say to That" (1999)	"The Best Day" (2000)	"Go On" (2000)

"The Best Day" is a song written by Dean Dillon and Carson Chamberlain, and recorded by American country music singer George Strait. It was released in January 2000 as the first single from his compilation album Latest Greatest Straitest Hits. The song reached the top of the Billboard Hot Country Singles & Tracks chart.

== Content ==
The song is about a father, who recalls his son. The song is in the key of A major with a 4/4 time signature and a slow tempo of about 66 beats per minute. Its intro uses the pattern A–A^{aug}–D–E^{7}, and the verses use a pattern of A–D–E–A.

== Critical reception ==
Larry Flick, of Billboard magazine reviewed the song favorably, calling it a "well-written tale that listeners will find easily relatable, and the chorus makes this the ultimate feel-good tune to kick off the millennium." He goes on to say that Strait's "warm-throated delivery is all honest emotion."

== Chart performance ==
The song entered the Hot Country Singles & Tracks chart at number 48 on the chart dated January 1, 2000, and spent 29 weeks on the chart. The song also climbed to number 1 after spending 17 weeks on the chart, where it held number 1 for three weeks on the chart dated April 22, 2000. In addition, this song became Strait's 36th Billboard Number One as a solo artist.

=== Peak positions ===
Chart (2000)	Peak position
Canada Country Singles (RPM)	7
US Billboard Hot 100	31
US Hot Country Songs (Billboard)	1

=== End of year charts ===
Chart (2000)	Position
U.S. Billboard Hot Country Singles & Tracks	6
U.S. Billboard Hot 100	80
