= Today My World Slipped Away =

Single by Vern Gosdin

from the album Today My World Slipped Away
- B-side: "Ain't It Been Love"
- Released: October 4, 1982
- Genre: Country
- Length: 3:14
- Label: AMI
- Songwriters: Mark Wright, Vern Gosdin
- Producer: Brien Fisher

Vern Gosdin singles chronology
"Your Bedroom Eyes" (1982)	"Today My World Slipped Away" (1982)	"Friday Night Feelin'" (1983)

"Today My World Slipped Away"

Single by George Strait

from the album Carrying Your Love with Me
- B-side: "Round About Way"
- Released: August 29, 1997
- Genre: Country
- Length: 3:14
- Label: MCA Nashville 72019
- Songwriters: Mark Wright, Vern Gosdin
- Producers: Tony Brown; George Strait

George Strait singles chronology
"Carrying Your Love with Me" (1997)	"Today My World Slipped Away" (1997)	"Round About Way" (1998)

"Today My World Slipped Away" is a song co-written and first recorded by American country music artist Vern Gosdin. Gosdin's version was released in October 1982 as the fifth single and title track from his album Today My World Slipped Away. Gosdin's version reached number 10 on the Billboard Hot Country Singles chart. George Strait released a cover of the song in September 1997 as the third single from his album Carrying Your Love with Me. Strait's version reached number 3 on the Billboard Hot Country Singles & Tracks chart in November 1997. Gosdin wrote the song with Mark Wright.

== Critical reception ==
=== Vern Gosdin version ===
Kip Kirby, of Billboard magazine reviewed the song favorably, saying that Gosdin's "great, resonant voice squeezes every nuance of pain out of this story of separation and loss." He goes on to say that the female harmony is "reminiscent of Gosdin's early vocal pairing with Emmylou Harris."

=== George Strait version ===
Wade Jessen, of Billboard magazine, called the Strait version a "tear-stained reprise."

== Chart performance ==
=== Vern Gosdin version ===
Chart (1982–1983)	Peak position
US Hot Country Songs (Billboard)	10

=== George Strait version ===
"Today My World Slipped Away" debuted at number 65 on the U.S. Billboard Hot Country Singles & Tracks for the week of September 6, 1997.

Chart (1997)	Peak position
Canada Country Singles (RPM)	7
US Hot Country Songs (Billboard)	3
