= Write This Down (song) =

Single by George Strait

from the album Always Never the Same
- B-side: "4 Minus 3 Equals Zero"
- Released: March 18, 1999
- Genre: Country
- Length: 3:39
- Label: MCA Nashville 72095
- Songwriters: Dana Hunt Black; Kent Robbins
- Producers: Tony Brown; George Strait

George Strait singles chronology
"Meanwhile" (1999)	"Write This Down" (1999)	"What Do You Say to That" (1999)

"Write This Down" is a song written by Dana Hunt Black and Kent Robbins and recorded by American country music singer George Strait. It was released in March 1999 as the second single from Strait's album Always Never the Same. It was Strait's 35th number one single on the US Billboard Hot Country Singles & Tracks (now Hot Country Songs) chart. It also reached number 27 on the Billboard Hot 100, becoming one of his most successful crossover singles to date.

== Music video ==
The music video was directed by Deaton Flanigen, Bill Young, and Jack Hattingh. It is a live video, filmed at his concert at Raymond James Stadium in Tampa, Florida, and premiered in mid-1999.

== Chart positions ==
=== Peak positions ===
"Write This Down" debuted at number 57 on the U.S. Billboard Hot Country Singles & Tracks for the week of March 13, 1999.

Chart (1999)	Peak position
Canada Country Singles (RPM)	1
US Billboard Hot 100	27
US Hot Country Songs (Billboard)	1

=== Year-end charts ===
Chart (1999)	Position
Canada Country Tracks (RPM)	7
US Billboard Hot 100	98
US Country Songs (Billboard)	2

== Certifications ==
Certifications for Write This Down
Region	Certification	Certified units/sales
United States (RIAA)	2× Platinum	2,000,000^{‡}
^{‡} Sales+streaming figures based on certification alone.
