= We Really Shouldn't Be Doing This =

Single by George Strait

from the album One Step at a Time
- Released: September 8, 1998
- Recorded: September 11, 1997
- Genre: Country
- Length: 2:29
- Label: MCA Nashville
- Songwriter: Jim Lauderdale
- Producers: Tony Brown; George Strait

George Strait singles chronology
"True" (1998)	"We Really Shouldn't Be Doing This" (1998)	"Meanwhile" (1999)

"We Really Shouldn't Be Doing This" is a song written by Jim Lauderdale, and recorded by American country music artist George Strait. It was released in September 1998 as the third and final single from his album One Step at a Time. It peaked at number four in the United States and number two in Canada.

== Background and writing ==
Jim Lauderdale told Taste of Country that the song came to him when he was living in Nashville. He was living in Buddy and Julie Miller’s apartment above their house. They were working on an album, so to get some sleep, he went over to the Union Station hotel and found a good writing room."

== Critical reception ==
Larry Flick, of Billboard reviewed the song favorably, saying that the melody is "infectious and the production is positively inventive." He goes on to call it "fun, frisky, and totally entertaining."

== Chart positions ==
"We Really Shouldn't Be Doing This" debuted at number 72 on the Hot Country Singles and Tracks chart dated May 2, 1998, from unsolicited airplay.

Chart (1998)	Peak position
Canada Country Singles (RPM)	2
US Hot Country Songs (Billboard)	4
