= She'll Leave You with a Smile =

Single by George Strait

from the album The Road Less Traveled
- Released: September 2, 2002
- Genre: Neotraditional country
- Length: 2:58 (album version); 2:44 (single edit)
- Label: MCA Nashville 12236
- Songwriters: Odie Blackmon; Jay Knowles
- Producers: Tony Brown; George Strait

George Strait singles chronology
| "Living and Living Well" (2002) | "She'll Leave You with a Smile" (2002) | "Tell Me Something Bad About Tulsa" (2003) |

"She'll Leave You with a Smile" is a song written by Odie Blackmon and Jay Knowles, and recorded by American country music artist George Strait. It was released in September 2002 as the third and last single from his album The Road Less Traveled. It was his 38th Number One hit on the Billboard Hot Country Singles & Tracks (now Hot Country Songs) charts. It became his 50th number 1 single (on combined charts) in December 2002. It was also a hit on the Hot 100, peaking at number 23 and becoming Strait's most successful crossover single to date.

It is not to be confused with a different song also entitled "She'll Leave You with a Smile", written by Jackson Leap and recorded by Strait on his 1997 album Carrying Your Love with Me.

== Content ==
The narrator details a past relationship.

== Critical reception ==
Rick Cohoon reviewed the song favorably, calling it "traditional Strait material".

== Music video ==
The music video was directed by Bud Schaetzle and premiered in late 2002. The music video was filmed live in concert.

== Chart history ==
"She'll Leave You with a Smile" debuted at number 38 on the U.S. Billboard Hot Country Singles & Tracks for the week of September 7, 2002.

| Chart (2002) | Peak position |
|---|---|
| US Hot Country Songs (Billboard) | 1 |
| US Billboard Hot 100 | 23 |

=== Year-end charts ===
| Chart (2002) | Position |
|---|---|
| US Country Songs (Billboard) | 55 |

| Chart (2003) | Position |
|---|---|
| US Country Songs (Billboard) | 31 |

== Certifications ==
Certifications for She'll Leave You with a Smile
| Region | Certification | Certified units/sales |
|---|---|---|
| United States (RIAA) | Platinum | 1,000,000^{‡} |
^{‡} Sales+streaming figures based on certification alone.
