= True (George Strait song) =

Single by George Strait

from the album One Step at a Time
- B-side: "Remember the Alamo"
- Released: June 22, 1998
- Recorded: September 8, 1997
- Genre: Country
- Length: 3:36 (album version); 3:12 (single edit)
- Label: MCA Nashville
- Songwriters: Marv Green; Jeff Stevens
- Producers: Tony Brown; George Strait

George Strait singles chronology
"I Just Want to Dance with You" (1998)	"True" (1998)	"We Really Shouldn't Be Doing This" (1998)

"True" is a song written by Marv Green and Jeff Stevens, and recorded by American country music artist George Strait. It was released in June 1998 as the second single from his album One Step at a Time. The song peaked at number 2 on the U.S. Billboard Hot Country Singles & Tracks (now Hot Country Songs) charts and reached number-one on the Canadian RPM Country Tracks chart.

== Critical reception ==
Larry Flick, of Billboard magazine reviewed the song favorably, saying that the production has an "open, airy feel that underscores the honest emotion in the lyric." He goes on to say that Strait's phrasing "adds appeal and turns a sweet, ordinary song into something special."

== Chart performance ==
The song debuted at number 69 on the Hot Country Singles & Tracks chart dated May 2, 1998, from unsolicited airplay, while "I Just Want to Dance With You" was still climbing that chart. A month later, it was released as a single, and re-entered the chart at number 64 on the week of June 13, 1998. It charted for a total of 25 weeks on that chart, and peaked at number two on the chart dated August 29, 1998.

"True" also went to number one on the American Radio & Records country music charts.

=== Charts ===
Chart (1998)	Peak position
Canada Country Singles (RPM)	1
US Hot Country Songs (Billboard)	2

=== Year-end charts ===
Chart (1998)	Position
Canada Country Tracks (RPM)	23
US Country Songs (Billboard)	11
