= Living and Living Well =

Single by George Strait

from the album The Road Less Traveled
- Released: February 4, 2002
- Genre: Country
- Length: 3:38 (album version); 3:27 (single edit)
- Label: MCA Nashville
- Songwriters: Tony Martin; Mark Nesler; Tom Shapiro
- Producers: Tony Brown; George Strait

George Strait singles chronology
"Run" (2001)	"Living and Living Well" (2002)	"She'll Leave You with a Smile" (2002)

"Living and Living Well" is a song written by Tony Martin, Mark Nesler and Tom Shapiro, and recorded by American country music artist George Strait. It was released in February 2002 as the second single from his album The Road Less Traveled. The song reached number one on the U.S. Billboard Hot Country Singles & Tracks in June 2002. It also peaked at number 27 on the Billboard Hot 100.

== Chart positions ==
"Living and Living Well" debuted at number 59 on the U.S. Billboard Hot Country Singles & Tracks for the week of February 16, 2002.

Chart (2002)	Peak position
US Hot Country Songs (Billboard)	1
US Billboard Hot 100	27

=== Year-end charts ===
Chart (2002)	Position
US Country Songs (Billboard)	3
US Billboard Hot 100	93
