= I Just Want to Dance with You =

"I Just Want To Dance With You"

Single by George Strait

from the album One Step at a Time
- B-side: "Neon Row"
- Released: April 13, 1998
- Genre: Country
- Length: 3:27 (album version); 3:18 (single edit)
- Label: MCA Nashville
- Songwriters: Roger Cook, John Prine
- Producers: Tony Brown, George Strait

George Strait singles chronology
"Round About Way" (1998)	"I Just Want To Dance With You" (1998)	"True" (1998)

"I Just Want to Dance with You" is a song written by John Prine and Roger Cook, and recorded by American country music singer George Strait. It was released in April 1998 as the first single to his album One Step at a Time. The song is his 34th Number One single on the Billboard Hot Country Singles & Tracks chart, and his 42nd Number One single when all major trade charts are counted. Prine recorded it 12 years earlier, for his 1986 album German Afternoons.

It was also a hit for Daniel O'Donnell in 1992, reaching 20 in the UK charts.

== Critical reception ==
Billboard magazine reviewed the song favorably, calling it a "tropical flavored li'l ditty, awash in delicate guitar work that is as tantalizing and refreshing as a summer breeze," and although the lyric was rather preschoolish, Strait's crisp co-production with Tony Brown and his appealing vocal performance should help overcome that obstacle.

== Chart positions ==
"I Just Want to Dance with You" debuted at number 38 on the U.S. Billboard Hot Country Singles & Tracks for the week of April 18, 1998.

Chart (1998)	Peak position
Canada Country Singles (RPM)	1
US Billboard Hot 100	61
US Hot Country Songs (Billboard)	1

=== Year-end charts ===
Chart (1998)	Position
Canada Country Tracks (RPM)	7
US Country Songs (Billboard)	7

== Certifications ==
Region	Certification	Certified units/sales
United States (RIAA)	Platinum	1,000,000^{‡}
^{‡} Sales+streaming figures based on certification alone.
