= Carrying Your Love with Me (song) =

Single by George Strait

from the album Carrying Your Love with Me
- B-side: "I've Got a Funny Feeling"
- Released: May 22, 1997
- Recorded: September 23, 1996
- Genre: Neotraditional country
- Length: 3:50 (album version); 3:07 (single edit)
- Label: MCA Nashville
- Songwriters: Steve Bogard; Jeff Stevens
- Producers: Tony Brown; George Strait

George Strait singles chronology
"One Night at a Time" (1997)	"Carrying Your Love with Me" (1997)	"Today My World Slipped Away" (1997)

"Carrying Your Love with Me" is a song written by Steve Bogard and Jeff Stevens, and recorded by American country music artist George Strait. It was released in May 1997 as the second single and title track from his album of the same name. The song reached the top of the Billboard Hot Country Singles & Tracks chart and became one of the biggest summer megahits for country music radio in 1997. The track was also voted by website Country Universe as number 200 of the top 400 greatest songs of the 1990s. "Carrying Your Love with Me" was nominated for Best Male Country Vocal Performance at the 1998 Grammy Awards.

== Content ==
The song is about a man who has to leave home for periods of time, though he carries the love of his significant other with him wherever he is. Memorable lyrics include the opening line, "Baby all I got is this beat up leather bag, and everything I own don't fill up half." Another notable line is in the chorus which includes the title of the song, "I'm carrying your love with me, West Virginia down to Tennessee."

== Music video ==
The music video was directed by Christopher Cain, and premiered on CMT on May 26, 1997, as its "Hot Shot Video of the Week". The video begins in black-and-white, where Strait walks into an empty auditorium, with an old leather bag at his side. The scene switches from black-and-white to color, Strait puts the leather bag down, looks directly into the camera, and began to sing. The video has scenes that relate to the lyrics of the song and keeps with the context of Strait being away from home and missing his significant other. The scenes include Strait walking along a highway, hitching a ride with a truck driver, standing in the rain, and missing his significant other back home as a couple on a motorcycle ride by and it shows the clouds, the waters, and the sun, and it shows Strait walking with a truck, during the instrumental break, he drives the truck into the water, and shows him walking down the road, The video ends with Strait picking up the leather bag from the beginning of the video, and leaving an empty auditorium, as the scene switched back to black-and-white. The singer joined Vevo on May 11, 2009.

== Significance ==
"Carrying Your Love with Me" contributed to the overall success of Strait's album of the same name. It was Strait's 21st release with record company MCA Nashville. At the time the singer had been with the label for 15 years. Although many critics argue that the track was nothing new from the country music album, it was still a success. Many reviewers stated that during a time of pop country and big revenue stars such as Shania Twain and Garth Brooks, Strait along with his album (and song) "Carrying Your Love with Me" kept country music relevant. In April 1998 on All Things Considered, Jacki Lyden and country music DJ Tom Rivers discussed the appeal of country music. Using the track as an example, Rivers stated that country music is relatable because it speaks of common occurrences such as heartache and missing loved ones. The two deejays specifically mention the track "Carrying Your Love with Me" and use it as an ideal example.

In July 2022, the song regained popularity through singer David Morris in his song "Carrying Your Love". It is a country rap song that contains an altered sample of the chorus, which was produced by Robert Deahl, professionally known as KayohBeats. This song went viral on TikTok that month.

== Critical reception ==
The overall views for the track are positive. Many reviewers approve of the traditional country sound of the track. George Strait makes it very clear that he is not a songwriter, and many critics praise his ability to choose hit songs such as "Carrying Your Love with Me". Music critic Tony Brown stated that it is "unlikely that anyone in country music has a better ear for songs." Miriam Longino, writing for the Atlantic Constitution, gave the track and the album as a whole an A minus. Another notable review came from music critic Alexander Wiley. He stated that "Carrying Your Love with Me" was another "crown jewel from the king of country music". Critic Chet Flippo, writing for Billboard, gave a positive review stating that the track and tone of Strait's voice is reminiscent of traditional country music. Kevin John Coyne of Country Universe praised the catchiness of the song's hook and Strait's vocal interpretation of the song's lyrics.

== Chart positions ==
Chart (1997)	Peak position
Canada Country Singles (RPM)	1
US Hot Country Songs (Billboard)	1

=== Year-end charts ===
Chart (1997)	Position
Canada Country Tracks (RPM)	12
US Country Songs (Billboard)	3

== Certifications ==
Certifications for Carrying Your Love with Me
Region	Certification	Certified units/sales
United States (RIAA)	2× Platinum	2,000,000^{‡}
^{‡} Sales+streaming figures based on certification alone.
