= One Night at a Time =

Single by George Strait

from the album Carrying Your Love with Me
- B-side: "Won't You Come Home (and Talk To a Stranger)"
- Released: March 10, 1997
- Recorded: September 26, 1996
- Genre: Country
- Length: 3:49 (album version); 3:19 (single edit)
- Label: MCA Nashville
- Songwriters: Roger Cook, Eddie Kilgallon, Earl Bud Lee
- Producers: Tony Brown and George Strait

George Strait singles chronology
"King of the Mountain" (1996)	"One Night at a Time" (1997)	"Carrying Your Love with Me" (1997)

"One Night at a Time" is a song written by Roger Cook, Eddie Kilgallon, and Earl Bud Lee, and recorded by American country music singer George Strait. It was released in March 1997 as the first single from his album Carrying Your Love with Me. The song reached the top of the U.S. Billboard Hot Country Songs chart.

== Critical reception ==
Billboard magazine reviewed the song favorably, saying that while it has a little more pop-leaning production than a normal Strait record, the melody is "pretty and the flourishes of Mexicali-sounding guitar riffs add an intriguing flavor", going on to say that the song has a "light summertime feel to it."

== Chart positions ==
"One Night at a Time" debuted at number 37 on the U.S. Billboard Hot Country Singles & Tracks for the week of March 15, 1997.

Chart (1997)	Peak position
Canada Country Singles (RPM)	1
US Billboard Hot 100	59
US Hot Country Songs (Billboard)	1

=== Year-end charts ===
Chart (1997)	Position
Canada Country Tracks (RPM)	13
US Country Songs (Billboard)	2
