= The Cowboy Rides Away Tour =

2013–14 concert tour by George Strait

- Concert by George Strait
- Location: United States
- Associated album: Love Is Everything
- Start date: January 18, 2013
- End date: June 7, 2014
- Legs: 2
- No. of shows: 48

The Cowboy Rides Away Tour was a concert tour by American country music artist George Strait. The tour was divided into two legs: 21 concerts in 2013 and 27 concerts in 2014, for a total of 48 concerts, all in the United States. The tour started on January 18, 2013 in Lubbock, Texas, and ended in Arlington, Texas, on June 7, 2014. Strait was supported on the tour by his longtime eleven-member touring group, the Ace in the Hole Band. Appearing in arenas with six stadium dates included, Strait performed many of his most popular recordings and performance songs, including uptempo hits such as "Here for a Good Time", "Ocean Front Property", "How 'Bout Them Cowgirls", and "Troubadour", and softer ballads such as "I Saw God Today", "The Chair", and "I Can Still Make Cheyenne". His encores included "All My Ex's Live in Texas" and "Folsom Prison Blues", and he closed each show with one of his earliest hit songs, "The Cowboy Rides Away". This song that inspired the name for the tour was written by Sonny Throckmorton and Casey Kelly.

The tour received positive reviews, with one reviewer calling his shows "an embarrassment of riches", and another recognizing Strait's "compelling stage presence and vocal power". All 48 concerts were sold out, and for the week of February 7, 2014, the Cowboy Rides Away Tour was the top-grossing tour in the United States. The final concert at AT&T Stadium in Arlington, Texas, which featured special guests Martina McBride, Kenny Chesney, Eric Church, Vince Gill, Jason Aldean, Faith Hill, Alan Jackson, Miranda Lambert, and Sheryl Crow, drew 104,793 fans—the largest attendance at any “indoor” concert in U.S. history. The concert also set a record for the largest gross at a single-show country concert, $18,194,374. In 2013 he was named Country Music Association Entertainer of the Year, and in 2014 he was named Academy of Country Music Entertainer of the Year.

== Background ==
Strait began performing live shows with the Ace in the Hole Band in San Marcos, Texas, in October 1975. In 1981, after Strait signed a record contract with MCA Records, they became his permanent touring band and have accompanied him on every tour for over thirty years. On September 26, 2012, Strait announced that he was retiring from touring, and that his upcoming tour, titled The Cowboy Rides Away Tour, would be his last.

== Description ==
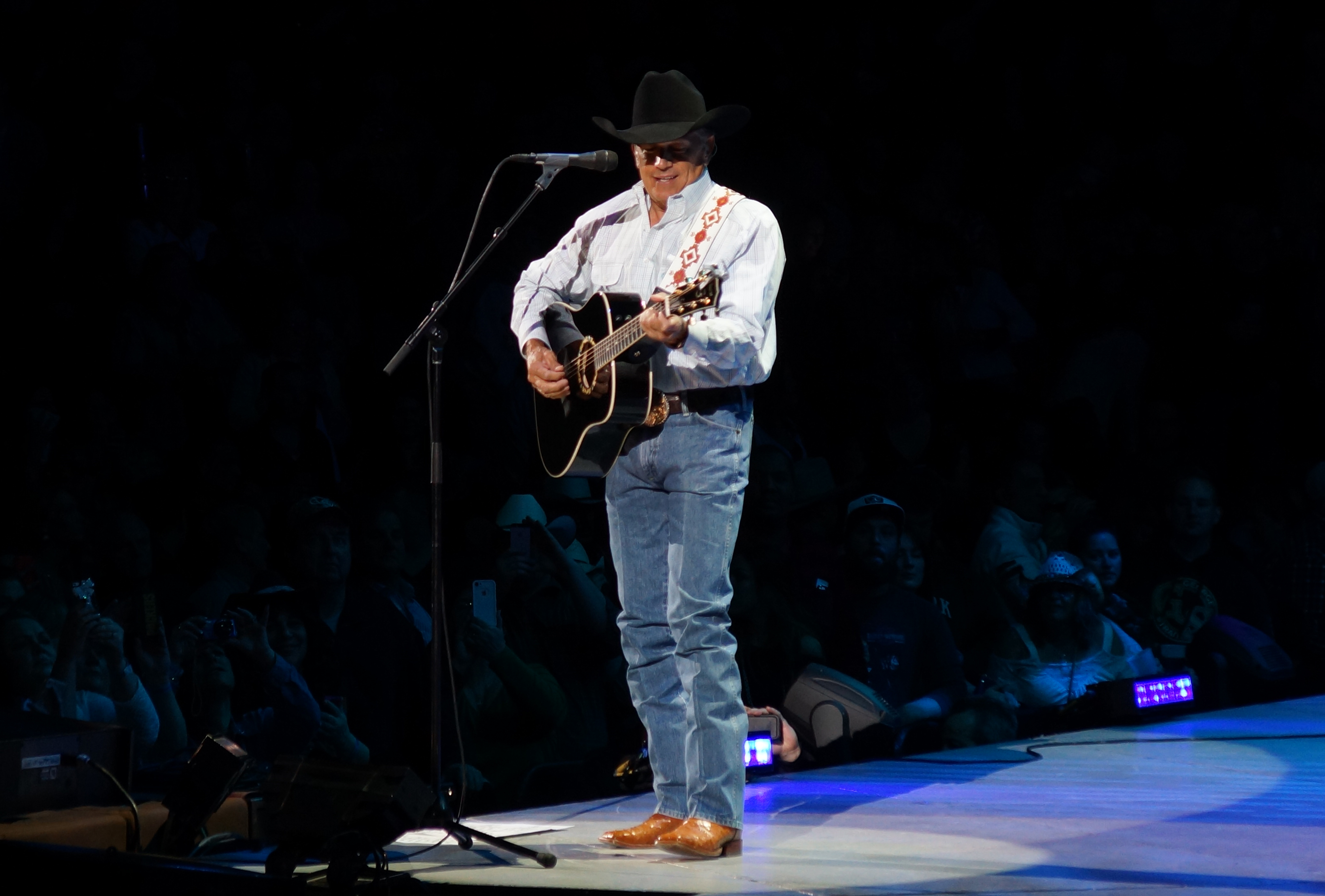
George Strait at the Prudential Center in Newark, New Jersey, USA, March 1, 2014

The concerts were set mainly in arenas with six stadium dates included, and typically consisted of a one-hour opening act—Martina McBride for most of the 2013 concerts—followed by a half hour intermission. Strait then performed a two-hour set of about 33 songs representing all phases of his music career. Wearing his usual black Resistol cowboy hat, pressed Wrangler jeans, a button-down Western shirt, large silver belt buckle, and low heel cowboy boots, Strait performed in the round with the eleven-member Ace in the Hole Band distributed centrally on the stage with Strait singing from each corner of the square stage in two-song segments. The Ace in the Hole Band consists of Terry Hale (bass), Mike Daily (steel guitar), Ron Huckaby (piano), Rick McRae (electric guitar, fiddle), Benny McArthur (electric guitar, fiddle), Mike Kennedy (drums), Gene Elders (fiddle), Joe Manuel (acoustic guitar), John Michael Whitby (keyboards), Marty Slayton (background vocals), and Thom Flora (background vocals). Strait played a black Taylor PS10ce Dreadnought Presentation Series guitar on every song.

Strait's setlist typically consisted of a mix of his most popular recordings and performance songs, including uptempo hits like "Here for a Good Time", "Ocean Front Property", "Check Yes or No", "Marina Del Rey", "How 'Bout Them Cowgirls", "Give It Away", "Amarillo by Morning", and "Troubadour", offset by softer ballads like "I Saw God Today", "The Chair", "Living for the Night", "I Can Still Make Cheyenne", and "I'll Always Remember You". His performances were delivered "with no flash or hurry". Strait's set was briefly interrupted by a ten-minute presentation given by Retired General Leroy Sisco of the Military Warriors Support Foundation to honor a wounded serviceman with the gift of a house. Strait typically performed three to five encore songs, including "All My Ex's Live in Texas" and "Folsum Prison Blues", one of a handful of cover songs he adds to the set each concert. Strait closed each show with one of his earliest hit songs, "The Cowboy Rides Away".

The Cowboy Rides Away Tour closed with three stadium concerts. At the final concert on June 7, 2014 at AT&T Stadium in Arlington, Texas, Martina McBride joined an all-star bill that included Kenny Chesney, Eric Church, Vince Gill, Faith Hill, Alan Jackson, Miranda Lambert, Lee Ann Womack, Sheryl Crow, and Asleep at the Wheel. The concert drew 104,793 fans. At the time, both the largest attendance at a single-headliner concert in the United States and the largest ticketed attendance ever at a concert in a stadium in the United States. Strait would then break both his own records ten years later, on Saturday, June 15, 2024, with a concert at Kyle Field at Texas A&M University in College Station, Texas, with 110,905 fans in attendance. The Arlington concert also set a record for the largest gross at a single-show country concert, $18,194,374. A live album recorded from the final concert in Arlington titled The Cowboy Rides Away: Live from AT&T Stadium was released on September 16, 2014, with a DVD of the concert being released on November 10, 2014, with Walmart exclusively releasing a deluxe edition including the cd as well. On August 29, 2014, the Country Music Television channel broadcast a two-hour concert special of the event titled George Strait: The Cowboy Rides Away. The concert was recorded by Chuck Ainlay with David Hewitt on Remote Recording's Silver Truck.

During the first leg of the tour, Strait was named the Country Music Association Entertainer of the Year in November 2013. During the second leg of the tour, he was named the Academy of Country Music Entertainer of the Year in April 2014.

== Critical response ==
In his review for the Austin Chronicle, Doug Freeman praised the artist's performance for the first concert of the 2014 leg of the tour, and his selection of songs that "only skim the depth of his catalog". Freeman noted that despite the changes that have taken place in popular country music, Strait has "remained the genre's compass". Freeman concluded:

Perhaps most remarkable was the vibrancy of Strait's voice throughout the epic set. Though each song was delivered with a consistency that matched their familiar studio versions, his vocals remained equally sharp and subtle, whether diving low and textured on "Drinkin' Man" or smoothly drawled on "I Can Still Make Cheyenne".

In his review for AZCentral, Jason P. Woodbury praised Strait's February 7, 2014 concert at the US Airways Center in Phoenix, calling his performance "an embarrassment of riches". Woodbury observed:

The crowd, the absolute loudest crowd I've ever heard, couldn't have asked for more. Strait is a rare kind of superstar, one whose command over the crowd isn't rooted in bombastic theatrics or flashy pyrotechnics. No, Strait's presentation is understated, classy, and sly, and his songs ... match Strait's steady charisma.

Woodbury concluded, "He's a subtle performer, and the classic sense of regret and longing he brings to songs like 'You Look So Good in Love', 'Nobody in His Right Mind Would've Left Here', and 'A Fire I Can't Put Out' is tempered by soft humor and wit."

In his review for Billboard magazine, Thom Duffy praised Strait's March 1, 2014 performance at the Prudential Center in Newark, noting his ability to "turn musical moods at ease, as if guiding a favorite horse on a tricky trail". Duffy concluded:

Strait's ability to move his audiences remains undeniable, even on this final tour. No doubt, his talent lies first in an unerring skill at picking remarkable songs from among the finest writers in Nashville and beyond. But beyond his song choices and his amazing band, Strait on Saturday showed compelling stage presence and vocal power. ... There are few other great American vocalists in any genre—the late Frank Sinatra comes to mind—who can convey intense emotion with such effortlessness and understatement as George Strait.

For the week of February 7, 2014, the Cowboy Rides Away Tour was the top-grossing tour in the United States, earning $6.4 million in four sold out arena concerts.

== Tour dates ==
Date	City	Venue	Special Guests
2013
January 18, 2013	Lubbock	United Spirit Arena	Martina McBride
January 19, 2013	Oklahoma City	Chesapeake Energy Arena	Martina McBride
January 25, 2013	Salt Lake City	EnergySolutions Arena	Martina McBride
January 26, 2013	Nampa	Idaho Center	Martina McBride
January 31, 2013	Sacramento	Sleep Train Arena	Martina McBride
February 1, 2013	Fresno	Save Mart Center	Martina McBride
February 2, 2013	Las Vegas	MGM Grand Garden Arena	Martina McBride
February 15, 2013	St. Paul	Xcel Energy Center	Martina McBride
February 16, 2013	Grand Forks	Alerus Center	Martina McBride
February 22, 2013	Buffalo	First Niagara Center	Martina McBride
February 23, 2013	Hartford	XL Center	Martina McBride
March 1, 2013	Knoxville	Thompson–Boling Arena	Martina McBride
March 2, 2013	Lexington	Rupp Arena	Martina McBride
March 17, 2013	Houston	Houston Livestock Show and Rodeo	Martina McBride; Randy Rogers Band
March 22, 2013	Greenville	Bi-Lo Center	Martina McBride
March 23, 2013	Greensboro	Greensboro Coliseum	Martina McBride
April 5, 2013	Albuquerque	The Pit	Martina McBride
April 6, 2013	Las Cruces	Pan American Center	Martina McBride
April 12, 2013	North Little Rock	Verizon Arena	Martina McBride
April 13, 2013	New Orleans	New Orleans Arena	Martina McBride
June 1, 2013	San Antonio	Alamodome	Miranda Lambert; Martina McBride
2014
January 9, 2014	Bossier City	CenturyLink Center	Jason Aldean
January 10, 2014	Austin	Frank Erwin Center	Jason Aldean
January 17, 2014	Omaha	CenturyLink Center Omaha	Eric Church
January 18, 2014	Kansas City	Sprint Center	Eric Church
January 30, 2014	San Jose	SAP Center	Martina McBride
January 31, 2014	San Diego	Valley View Casino Center	Miranda Lambert
February 1, 2014	Las Vegas	MGM Grand Garden Arena	Miranda Lambert
February 7, 2014	Phoenix	US Airways Center	Martina McBride
February 8, 2014	Los Angeles	Staples Center	Martina McBride
February 14, 2014	Auburn Hills	The Palace of Auburn Hills	Little Big Town
February 15, 2014	Columbus	Nationwide Arena	Little Big Town
February 28, 2014	Philadelphia	Wells Fargo Center	Martina McBride
March 1, 2014	Newark	Prudential Center	Martina McBride
March 7, 2014	Louisville	KFC Yum! Center	Vince Gill
March 8, 2014	Rosemont	Allstate Arena	Vince Gill
March 21, 2014	Nashville	Bridgestone Arena	Sheryl Crow
March 22, 2014	Atlanta	Philips Arena	Sheryl Crow
April 4, 2014	Wichita	Intrust Bank Arena	Lee Ann Womack; Merle Haggard
April 5, 2014	Denver	Pepsi Center	Lee Ann Womack; Merle Haggard
April 11, 2014	Portland	Moda Center	Chris Young
April 12, 2014	Tacoma	Tacoma Dome	Chris Young
April 18, 2014	Des Moines	Wells Fargo Arena	Ronnie Dunn
April 19, 2014	Tulsa	BOK Center	Ronnie Dunn
May 23, 2014	Baton Rouge	LSU Tiger Stadium	Jason Aldean; Luke Bryan; Eric Church
May 31, 2014	Foxborough	Gillette Stadium	Tim McGraw; Faith Hill
June 5, 2014	Hidalgo	State Farm Arena	Kyle Park
June 7, 2014	Arlington	AT&T Stadium	Jason Aldean; Kenny Chesney; Eric Church; Ronnie Dunn; Vince Gill; Faith Hill; Alan Jackson; Miranda Lambert; Martina McBride; Lee Ann Womack; Asleep at the Wheel

== Gallery ==
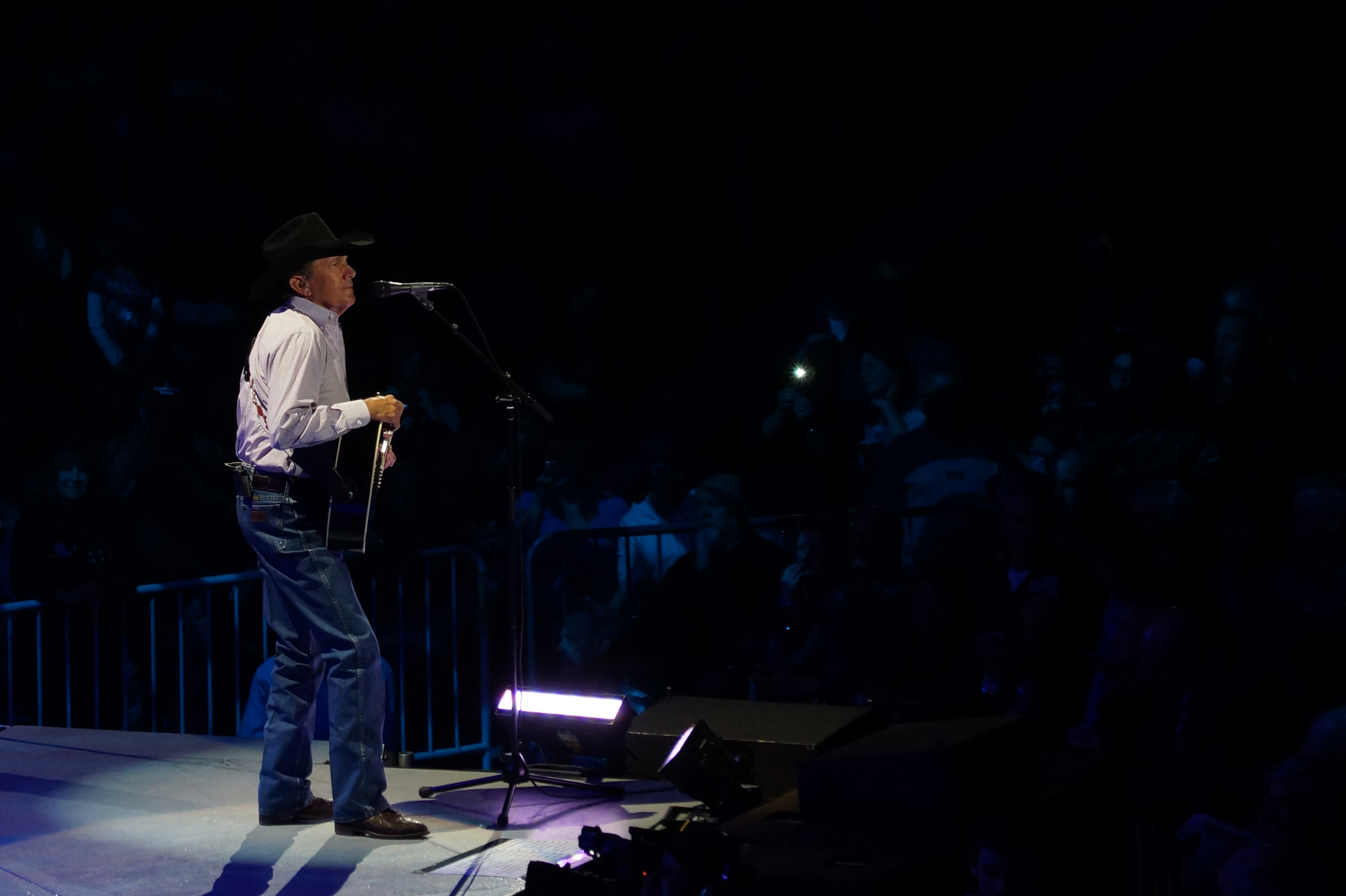
Hartford, Connecticut, February 23, 2013

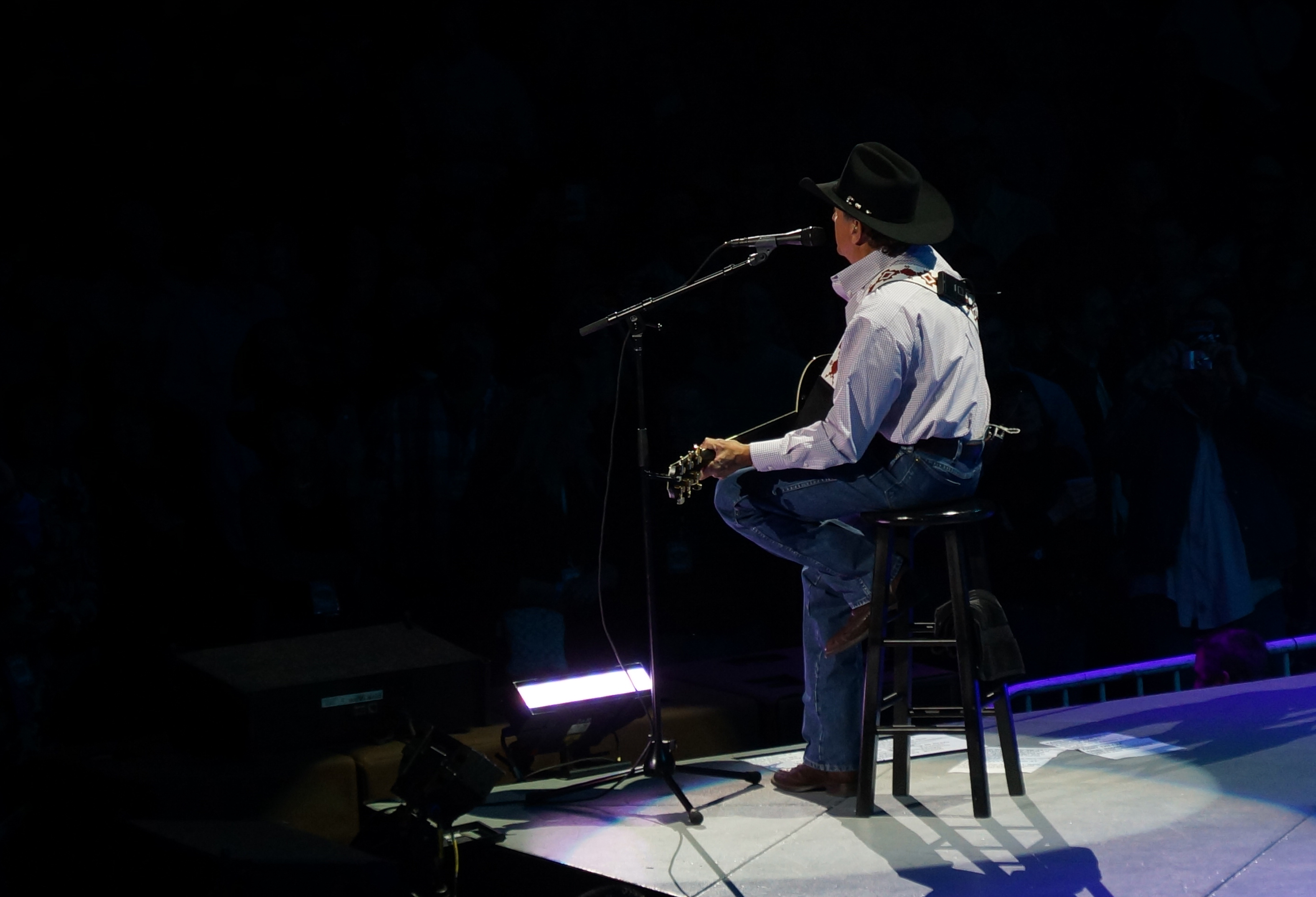
Hartford, Connecticut, February 23, 2013

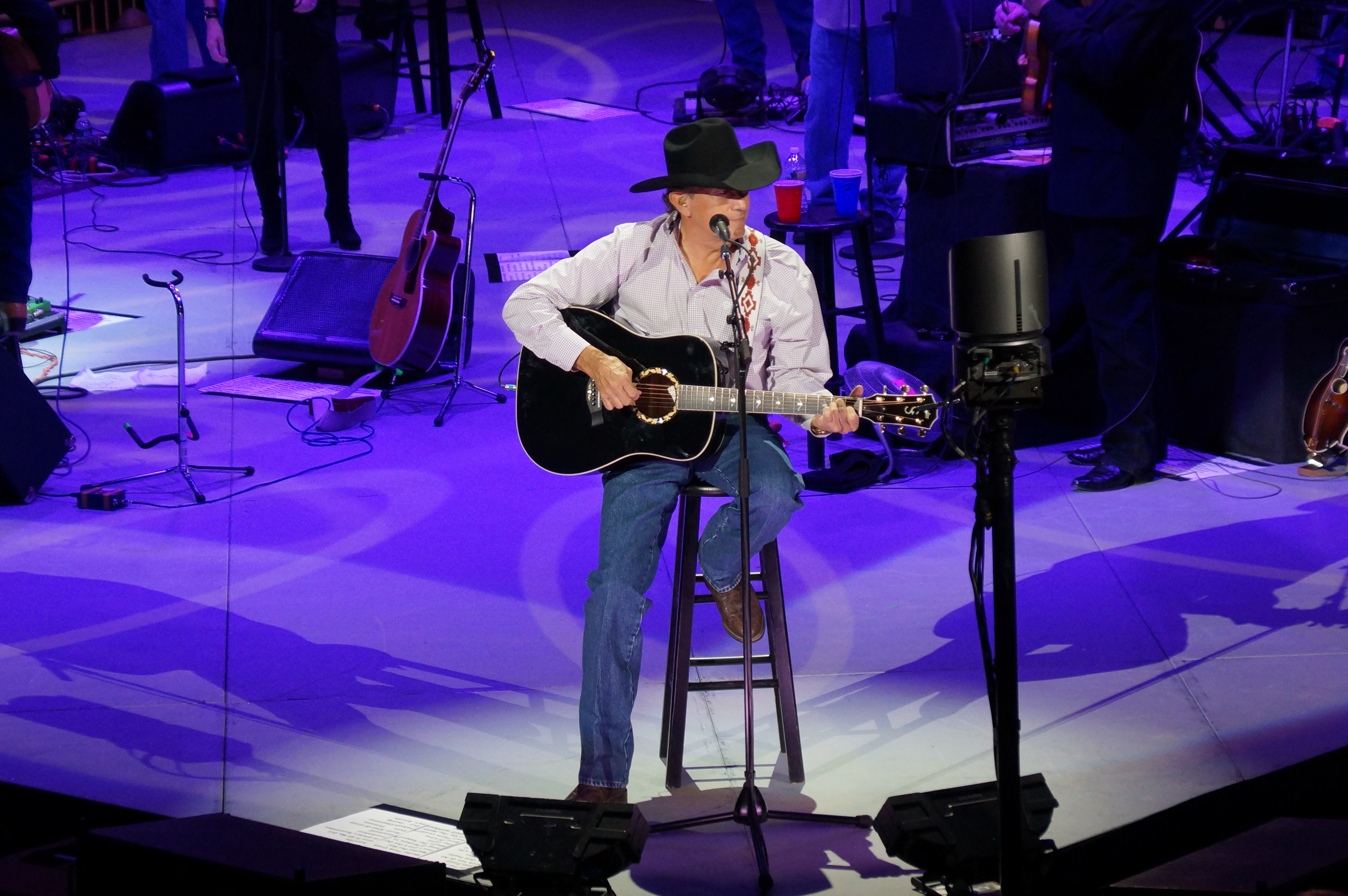
Hartford, Connecticut, February 23, 2013

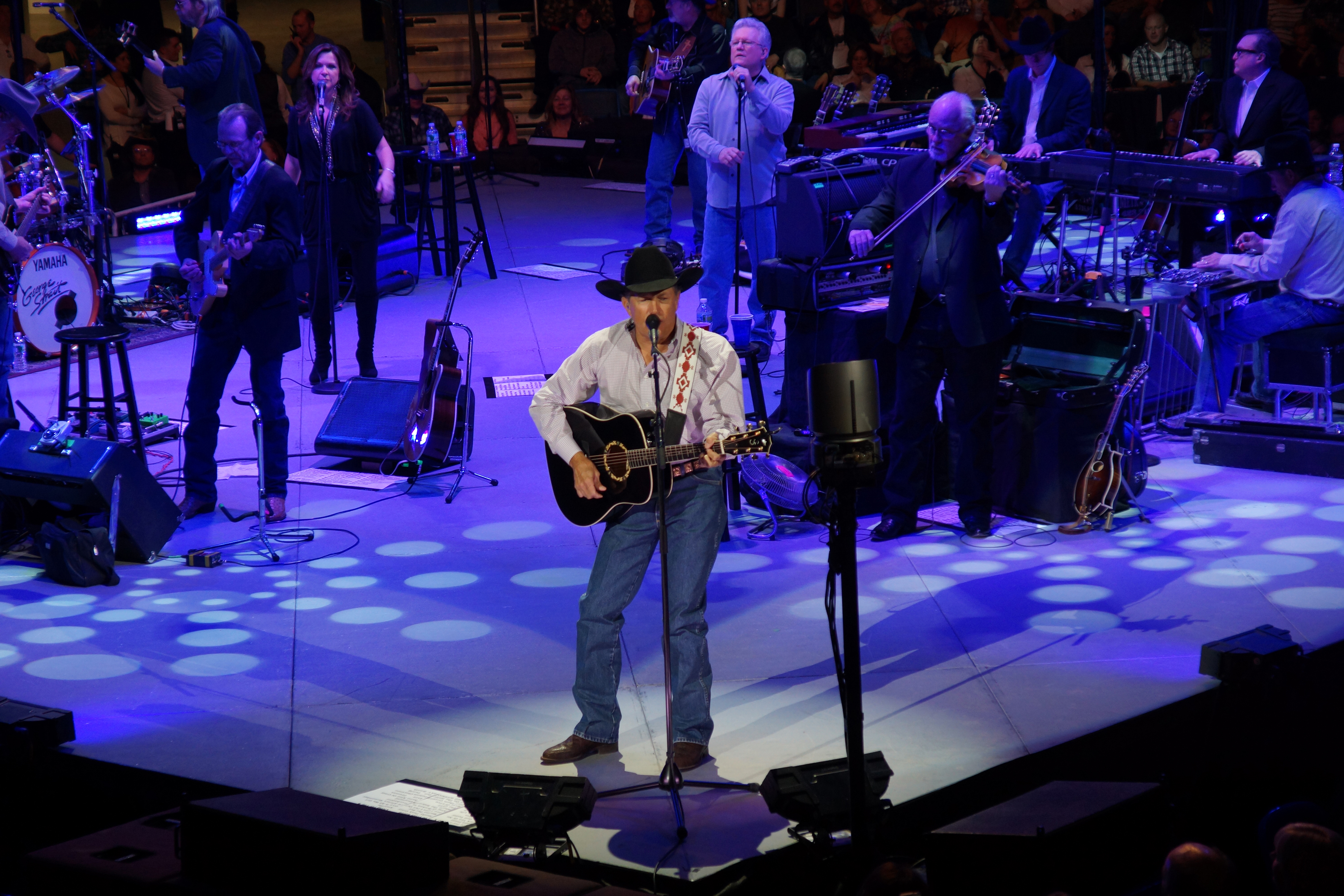
Hartford, Connecticut, February 23, 2013

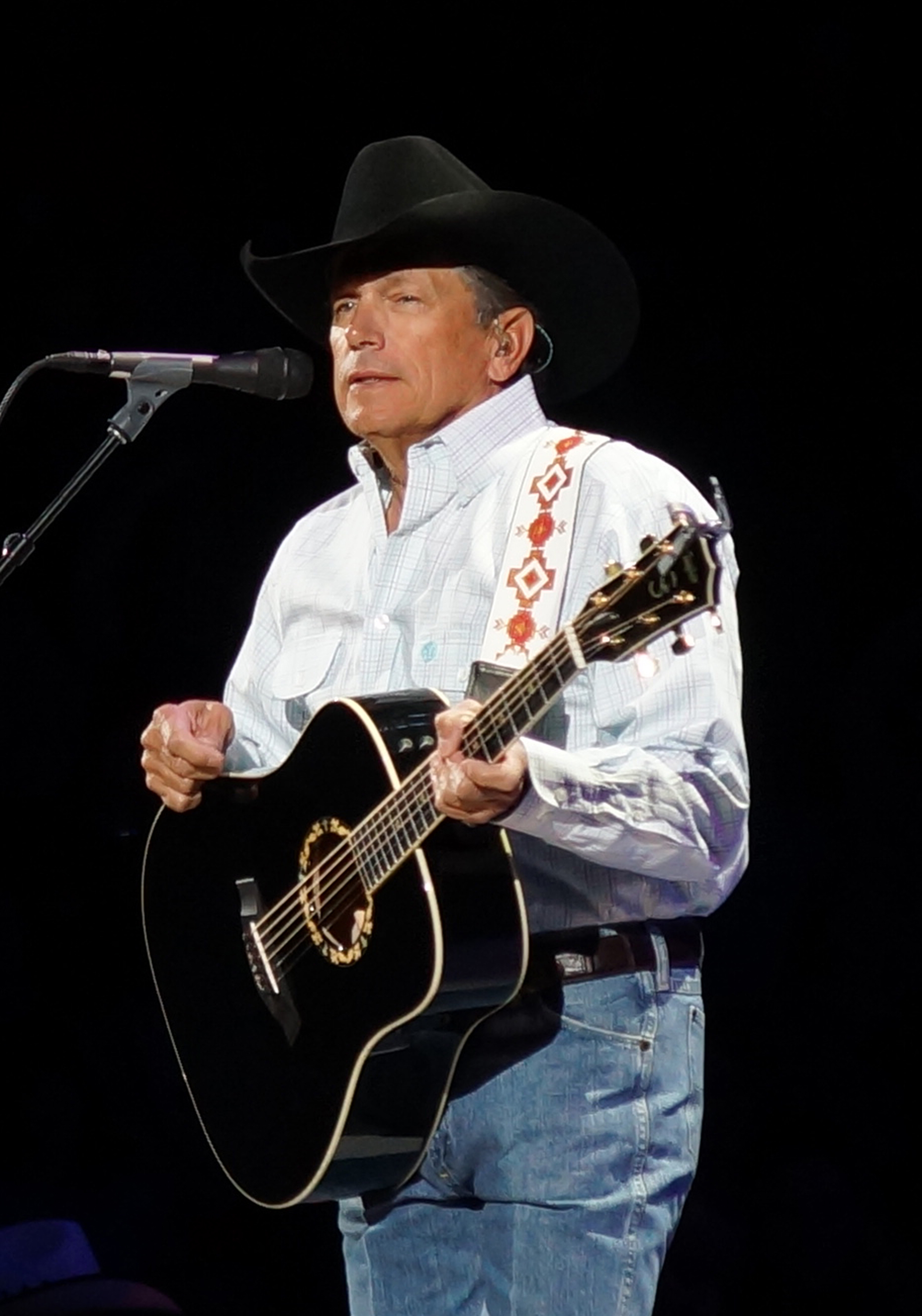
Newark, New Jersey, March 1, 2014

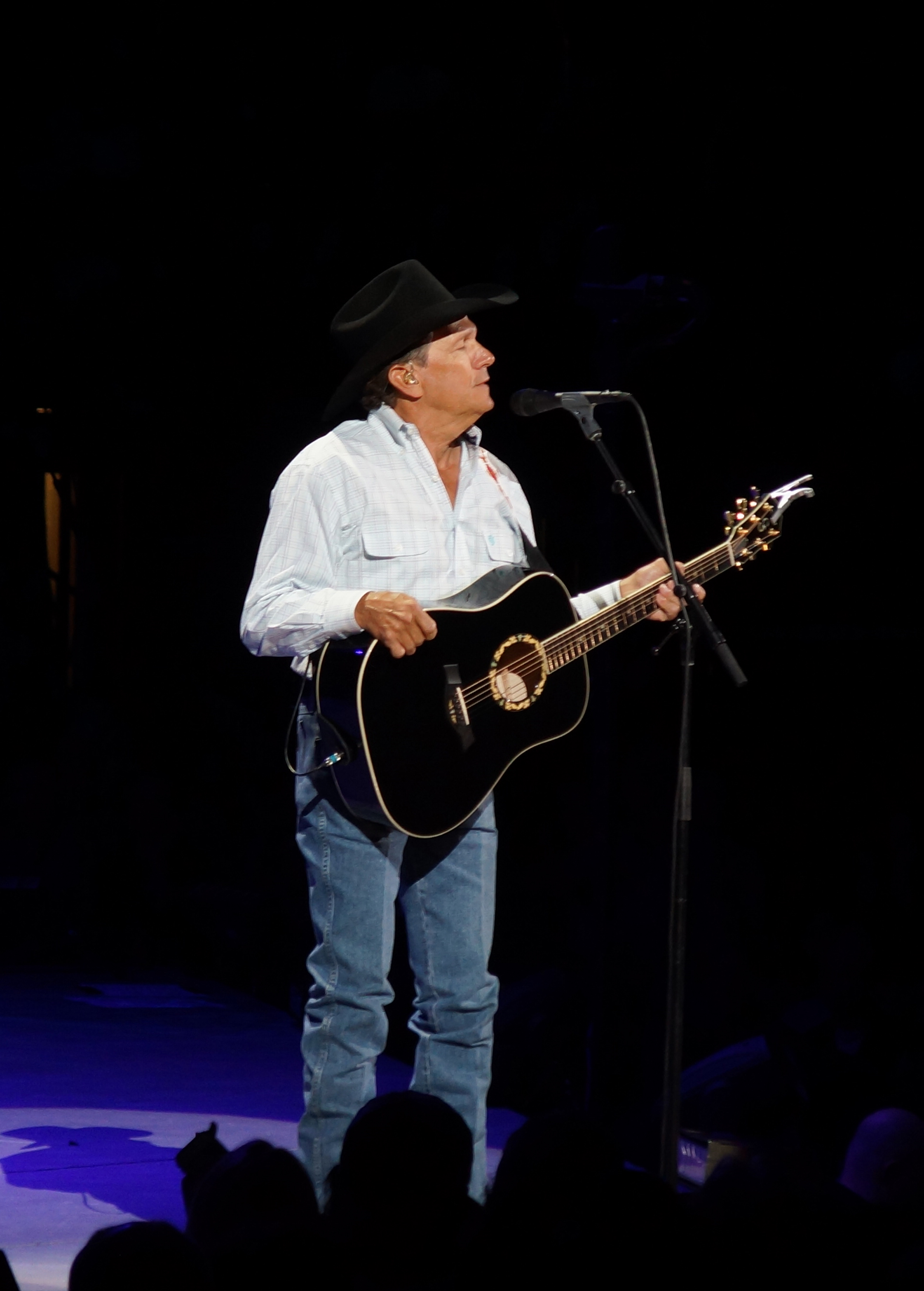
Newark, New Jersey, March 1, 2014
