= The Cowboy Rides Away: Live from AT&T Stadium =

Live album by George Strait
- Released: September 16, 2014
- Recorded: 2014
- Genre: Country
- Length: 77:00
- Label: MCA Nashville
- Producers: Chuck Ainlay; George Strait

George Strait chronology
Love Is Everything (2013)	The Cowboy Rides Away: Live from AT&T Stadium (2014)	Cold Beer Conversation (2015)

The Cowboy Rides Away: Live from AT&T Stadium is a live album released by George Strait in 2014. The title refers to the fact that this concert was the final performance of his final tour "The Cowboy Rides Away Tour" on June 7, 2014 at AT&T Stadium in Arlington, Texas. 104,793 people were in attendance, the largest ever single-show attendance at a U.S. stadium. An all-star lineup joined Strait on stage. The DVD of the concert was released on November 11. The show was recorded on Remote Recording's Silver Truck by Chuck Ainlay and David Hewitt.

== Track listing ==
No.	Title	Writer(s)	Length
1.	"Check Yes or No"	Danny Wells, Dana Hunt Black	3:26
2.	"Lovebug" (with Vince Gill)	Wayne Kemp, Curtis Wayne	3:02
3.	"Fool Hearted Memory" (with Jason Aldean)	Byron Hill, Blake Mevis	2:58
4.	"Arkansas Dave" (with Bubba Strait)	Bubba Strait	3:51
5.	"Cowboys Like Us" (with Eric Church)	Anthony Smith, Bob DiPiero	3:18
6.	"That's What Breaking Hearts Do"	George Strait, B. Strait	3:34
7.	"Marina del Rey"	Dean Dillon, Frank Dycus	4:17
8.	"Here for a Good Time" (with Sheryl Crow)	G. Strait, B. Strait, Dillon	2:55
9.	"I Can Still Make Cheyenne"	Aaron Barker, Erv Woolsey	4:28
10.	"Jackson" (with Martina McBride)	Billy Edd Wheeler, Jerry Leiber	3:10
11.	"A Showman's Life" (with Faith Hill)	Jesse Winchester	4:29
12.	"Murder on Music Row" (with Alan Jackson)	Larry Cordle, Larry Shell	4:45
13.	"The Chair"	Hank Cochran, Dillon	4:13
14.	"Give It All We Got Tonight"	Tim James, Phil O'Donnell, Mark Bright	3:44
15.	"Run" (with Miranda Lambert)	Smith, Tony Lane	3:48
16.	"I'll Always Remember You"	G. Strait, B. Strait, Dillon	4:16
17.	"Ocean Front Property" (with Kenny Chesney)	Dillon, Cochran, Royce Porter	3:17
18.	"Troubadour"	Leslie Satcher, Monty Holmes	2:57
19.	"All My Ex's Live in Texas" (with Jason Aldean, Ray Benson, Kenny Chesney, Eric Church, Sheryl Crow, Vince Gill, Faith Hill, Alan Jackson, Miranda Lambert and Martina McBride)	Sanger D. Shafer, Linda J. Shafer	3:28
20.	"The Cowboy Rides Away"	Sonny Throckmorton, Casey Kelly	7:04
Total length:			77:00

== Personnel ==
- Jason Aldean - vocals on "Fool Hearted Memory" and "All My Ex's Live in Texas"
- Ray Benson - vocals on "All My Ex's Live in Texas"
- Kenny Chesney - vocals on "Ocean Front Property" and "All My Ex's Live in Texas"
- Eric Church - vocals on "Cowboys Like Us" and "All My Ex's Live in Texas"
- Sheryl Crow - vocals on "Here for a Good Time" and "All My Ex's Live in Texas"
- Mike Daily - pedal steel guitar
- Gene Elders - fiddle, mandolin
- Thom Flora - backing vocals
- Vince Gill - vocals on "Lovebug" and "All My Ex's Live in Texas"
- Faith Hill - vocals on "A Showman's Life" and "All My Ex's Live in Texas"
- Ronnie Huckaby - piano
- Alan Jackson - vocals on "Murder on Music Row" and "All My Ex's Live in Texas"
- Mike Kennedy - drums
- Miranda Lambert - vocals on "Run" and "All My Ex's Live in Texas"
- Mac McAnally - acoustic guitar
- Benny McArthur - fiddle, acoustic and electric guitars
- Martina McBride - vocals on "Jackson" and "All My Ex's Live in Texas"
- Rick McRae - electric guitar
- Joe Manuel - acoustic guitar
- Marty Slayton - backing vocals
- Bubba Strait - vocals on "Arkansas Dave"
- George Strait - lead vocals, acoustic guitar
- John Michael Whitby - acoustic guitar, keyboards
- Glenn Worf - bass guitar

== Chart performance ==
The album debuted at No. 4 on the Billboard 200, and No. 2 on the Hot Country Albums chart, with 51,000 copies sold for its first week. The album has sold 351,900 copies in the US as of October 2015.

=== Weekly charts ===
Chart (2014–15)	Peak position
Canadian Albums (Billboard)	16
US Billboard 200	4
US Top Country Albums (Billboard)	2

=== Year-end charts ===
Chart (2014)	Position
US Billboard 200	121
US Top Country Albums (Billboard)	26
Chart (2015)	Position
US Billboard 200	185
US Top Country Albums (Billboard)	19
