= Cold Beer Conversation =

Studio album by George Strait
- Released: September 25, 2015
- Recorded: 2015
- Studio: Shrimpboat Sound (Key West, Florida); Sound Stage Studios and Big Gassed Studios (Nashville, Tennessee); Harter Sound (San Antonio, Texas).
- Genre: Country
- Length: 46:09
- Label: MCA Nashville
- Producer: Chuck Ainlay; George Strait

George Strait chronology
The Cowboy Rides Away: Live from AT&T Stadium (2014)	Cold Beer Conversation (2015)	Strait Out of the Box: Part 2 (2016)

Singles from Cold Beer Conversation
- 1. "Let It Go" Released: April 20, 2015; 2. "Cold Beer Conversation" Released: September 23, 2015; 3. "Goin' Goin' Gone" Released: September 26, 2016

Cold Beer Conversation is the twenty-ninth studio album by American country music artist George Strait. It was released on September 25, 2015 via MCA Nashville. The album's first single, "Let It Go", was released to radio on April 20, 2015.

== Commercial performance ==
Cold Beer Conversation debuted on the Billboard 200 at No. 4 and Top Country Albums at No. 1, selling 86,000 units, 83,000 of which are pure album sales. It reached No. 1 on the Top Country Albums chart in its second week, with another 30,000 units sold, making it Strait's 26th No. 1 on this chart. The album has sold 231,500 copies in the US as of April 2016.

== Track listing ==
No.	Title	Writer(s)	Length
1.	"It Was Love"	Keith Gattis	3:31
2.	"Cold Beer Conversation"	Al Anderson, Ben Hayslip, Jimmy Yeary	3:49
3.	"Let It Go"	George Strait, Bubba Strait, Gattis	3:33
4.	"Goin' Goin' Gone"	Wyatt Earp, Gattis	4:14
5.	"Something Going Down"	Jamey Johnson, Tom Shapiro	3:13
6.	"Take Me to Texas"	Brandy Clark, Shane McAnally	3:30
7.	"It Takes All Kinds"	G. Strait, B. Strait, Bob Regan, Wil Nance	2:52
8.	"Stop and Drink"	Dale Dodson, Troy Jones	3:58
9.	"Everything I See"	G. Strait, B. Strait, Dean Dillon, Gattis	3:49
10.	"Rock Paper Scissors"	Casey Beathard, Monty Criswell, B. Strait	3:05
11.	"Wish You Well"	Clint Daniels, Jeff Hyde, Brice Long	3:36
12.	"Cheaper Than a Shrink"	Bill Anderson, Buddy Cannon, Johnson	3:33
13.	"Even When I Can't Feel It"	Dillon, Hayslip, Lee Thomas Miller	3:34
Total length:			46:17

== Personnel ==
From Cold Beer Conversation liner notes.

Musicians

- George Strait – lead vocals
- Mike Rojas – acoustic piano, Hammond B3 organ, synthesizers, accordion
- J. T. Corenflos – electric guitars
- Stuart Duncan – acoustic guitar, fiddle, mandolin
- Brent Mason – acoustic guitar, electric guitars
- Mac McAnally – acoustic guitar, ukulele, backing vocals
- Paul Franklin – dobro, steel guitar
- Glenn Worf – bass guitar, upright bass
- Greg Morrow – drums, percussion
- Buddy Cannon – backing vocals
- Perry Coleman – backing vocals
- Thom Flora – backing vocals
- Wes Hightower – backing vocals
- Jamey Johnson – backing vocals
- Marty Slayton – backing vocals

Production

- George Strait – producer
- Chuck Ainlay – producer, recording, mixing
- Brandon Schexnayder – recording, assistant engineer
- T. W. Cargile – additional engineer
- Keith Harter – additional engineer
- Bob Ludwig – mastering at Gateway Mastering (Portland, Maine)
- Brittany Hamlin – production coordinator
- Craig Allen – design
- Karen Naff – art direction
- Wayne Brezinka – original cover artwork, interior collage artwork
- Erv Woolsey – management

== Chart positions ==
=== Weekly charts ===
Chart (2015)	Peak position
Australian Albums (ARIA)	74
Canadian Albums (Billboard)	15
US Billboard 200	4
US Top Country Albums (Billboard)	1

=== Year-end charts ===
Chart (2015)	Position
US Billboard 200	178
US Top Country Albums (Billboard)	25
Chart (2016)	Position
US Top Country Albums (Billboard)	40

=== Singles ===
Year	Single	Peak chart positions			
Year	Single	US Country	US Country Airplay	US	CAN Country
2015	"Let It Go"	29	46	118	—
2015	"Cold Beer Conversation"	36	33	—	43
2016	"Goin' Goin' Gone"	—	—	—	—
"—" denotes releases that did not chart
