= Scott Claassen =

American Episcopal priest and musician

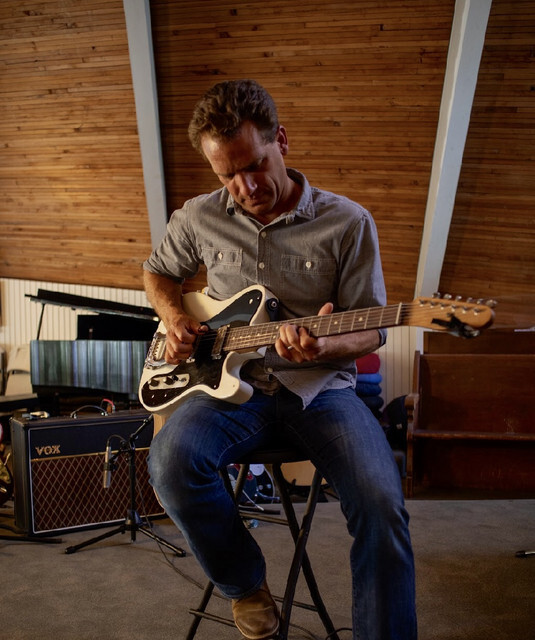

Background information
- Born: Scott Allen Claassen; January 23, 1979 (age 47); Monterey, California, U.S.
- Genres: Americana, Folk, Indie rock, World music
- Occupations: Episcopal priest, musician
- Years active: 1997–present
- Formerly of: The Lost Trailers, The Broken West
- Spouse: Maribeth Claassen (Married 2013–present)
- Website: amovingstillness.com

Scott Claassen is an American Episcopal priest and musician based in Santa Barbara, California. Following studies at Yale Divinity School, Claassen embarked on a yearlong Carbon Sabbath during which he refrained from driving or flying while bicycling over 11,500 miles around the United States engaging Christian communities in dialogue about climate change.

A lifelong multi-instrumentalist musician and songwriter, Claassen has penned hundreds of songs and appeared on dozens of records. Throughout his solo career he has released 8 studio albums and 3 EP's. His songs have been featured in Grey's Anatomy and in several films. His primary instruments are guitar, mandolin, and piano, but he also plays harmonica, banjo, charango, and a variety of other strings and keyboard instruments.

== Spiritual life ==
=== Carbon Sabbath ===
In 2011, Claassen completed his Master of Divinity from Yale Divinity School. Having investigated the relationship between faith and the environment at Yale's Forum for Religion and Ecology during his graduate studies, he was inspired to take a Carbon Sabbath. He would spend one year without flying or driving as well as eating a primarily plant-based diet and refraining from consumer demands like online shopping. During that period, Claassen bicycled over 11,500 miles around the United States to engage Christian communities of a variety of traditions in dialogue about climate change. The journey started and ended at his home church Thad's in Santa Monica, California. From there, he cycled north to Seattle, East to Washington, D.C., south to Jacksonville, and back to California. He also kept a blog of the journey.

=== Laundry Love Ordination ===
In April 2014, Claassen was ordained to the Episcopal diaconate in a laundromat as part of Thad's monthly Laundry Love ministry. Laundry Love is a nationwide phenomenon in which communities of faith and other organizations offer free laundry services to anyone in need. The ordination drew national attention to Laundry Love. Later that year, Claassen was ordained to the Episcopal priesthood at Thad's, an Episcopal church located in Santa Monica, California.

=== Surfing and Spirituality ===
While serving as the Episcopal chaplain to the University of California Santa Barbara (UCSB), Claassen started the Surfing & Spirituality program. This weekly group brings students together to surf and explore surfing as a spiritual practice. It meets Wednesday mornings, and it is open to all university students regardless of religious affiliation. The group has been featured in the Santa Barbara Independent, Living Lutheran magazine, and several publications in the Episcopal Church.

== Music career ==
=== Collaborations ===
During undergraduate in Nashville, Claassen played harmonica, mandolin, and keyboards in the jam band On the 8's. He also played mandolin and harmonica with The Lost Trailers and had songwriting credit on their album Welcome to the Woods.

While working as an outdoor guide in Austin, Texas, he played Fender Rhodes and trumpet with The Glass Family.

While living in Los Angeles, he played keyboards and vocals in The Broken West.

In 2021 Claassen and drummer Charles Kernkamp released an instrumental EP Salsipuedes under the band name Solimar. In 2023 they released the album Sol y Mar with the single "Saturday".

=== Solo career ===
As a solo artist, Claassen has released a variety of albums and EPs, as well as singles. His 2007 album Shiny Car in the Night includes soundbites from interviews conducted in 2006 with people across the country about the American Dream. His 2019 Big Sur Suite is a live recording of primary piano quintets and other instrumental music. In 2020, Claassen released the single "The Day John Prine Died" in honor of John Prine, the critically acclaimed songwriter who passed and in reflection upon the pandemic experience.

Claassen's 2022 record Alpine is an investigation into life in and around the mountains.

In 2023 the band formerly playing as Scott Classsen & Friends became Scojo and the Keel. "Scojo & the Keel’s breezy, roots-based music, and Scott’s boldly vulnerable lyrics have garnered the group comparisons to a “surf-rock” Jason Isbell." In July 2023 they released their first single Summer Days. Their second single Lost Coast was released in November 2023.

==== Discography ====
===== Albums =====
- Monterey (2005)
- Shiny Car in the Night (2007)
- Indio Sun (2010)
- Temas en Blue (2014)
- Camino Real (2018)
- Lost Valentines (2018)
- Carbon Cycle EP (2018)
- Big Sur Suite (2019)
- Alpine (2022)
- Sol y Mar EP (2023)

===== Singles =====
- "Lost Coast" (2023)
- "Saturday" (2023)
- "Summer Days" (2023)
- "I Have Been to the Mountain Top" (2022)
- "The Day John Prine Died" (2020)
- "I Have Been to the Mountaintop" (2022)
- "All Along" (2018)
