= Holler Back =

Studio album by The Lost Trailers
- Released: August 26, 2008
- Genre: Country
- Length: 35:10
- Label: BNA
- Producers: Brett Beavers; Blake Chancey; The Lost Trailers

The Lost Trailers chronology
The Lost Trailers (2006)	Holler Back (2008)	Trailblazer (2013)

Singles from Holler Back
- 1. "Holler Back" Released: March 17, 2008; 2. "How 'bout You Don't" Released: October 13, 2008; 3. "Country Folks Livin' Loud" Released: July 20, 2009

Holler Back is the fifth studio album by American country music group The Lost Trailers. It was released on August 26, 2008, as their second album for BNA Records. The album's title track was released in March 2008, becoming their first Top 10 hit that year with a peak at number 9. Following it was "How 'bout You Don't", a Top 20 hit. "All This Love" was originally chosen as the third single for release in June 2009 but after "Country Folks (Livin' Loud)" charted as an album cut, it was released as the album's next single.

== Content ==
Four songs from the group's 2006 album The Lost Trailers are included on this album: "Hey Baby", "All This Love", "Summer of Love" and "Gravy." The band produced most of the album along with Blake Chancey; Brett Beavers produced the title track, as well as "How 'bout You Don't" and "Things You Don’t Grow Out Of."

=== "Holler Back" ===
The album's title track also served as its lead-off single. Written by The Lost Trailers' lead singer Stokes Nielson and Tim James, this song became the band's first Top 40 country single in early 2008, reaching a peak of number 9 late in the year.

=== "How 'bout You Don't" ===
"How 'bout You Don't" was the album's second single, with a late 2008 release. Also co-written by Nielson, it reached a peak of number 17 on the country charts in June 2009.

=== "Country Folks Livin' Loud" ===
"Country Folks Livin' Loud" was released as the third single in July 2009 after charting as an album cut in June and replacing "All This Love" which was originally slated to be the third single. Vercher also criticized this song and "Holler Back" for their "inane mischaracterizations" of rural life.

== Critical reception ==
Professional ratings
Review scores
Source	Rating
Engine 145	1/5 stars
Country Standard Time	favorable

Brady Vercher of Engine 145 gave the album one star out of five, calling it "a ten-song amalgamation of uninspired lyrics, crass commercialism, recycled songs, and exaggerated stereotypes that fail to offer anything of substance." Country Standard Time's Robert Loy gave a generally positive review, praising the band's vocal harmonies and the "thematic consistency" throughout the songs, but thought that the lyrics to "Gravy" were "uncomfortable."

== Track listing ==
No.	Title	Writer(s)	Length
1.	"Holler Back"	Tim James, Stokes Nielson	3:10
2.	"How 'bout You Don't"	Nielson, Vicky McGehee, Jeremy Stover	2:41
3.	"Blacktop Road"	John Bettis, Ryan Tyndell, Brett Beavers	4:04
4.	"Country Folks (Livin' Loud)"	Ryder Lee, Nielson	3:45
5.	"Things You Don't Grow Out Of"	Ben Hayslip, Jimmy Yeary	4:03
6.	"Hey Baby"	Nielson	2:53
7.	"The Rest of Us"	Bryan Simpson, Stover	3:23
8.	"All This Love"	Gary Nicholson, Paul Overstreet, Nielson, Jon Randall	4:12
9.	"Summer of Love"	Nielson	3:28
10.	"Gravy"	Nielson	3:31

== Personnel ==
=== The Lost Trailers ===
- Ryder Lee- acoustic guitar, keyboards, background vocals
- Manny Medina- bass guitar, electric guitar, background vocals
- Andrew Nielson- bass guitar, harmonica, keyboards, background vocals
- Stokes Nielson- electric guitar, lead vocals
- Jeff Potter- drums, percussion, background vocals

=== Additional musicians ===
- Steve Brewster- drums
- Pat Buchanan- electric guitar
- Jimmy Carter- bass guitar
- Joe Chemay- bass guitar
- Lisa Cochran- background vocals
- Perry Coleman- background vocals
- J.T. Corenflos- electric guitar
- Steve Ebe- drums
- Mel Eubanks- banjo
- Thom Flora- background vocals
- Larry Franklin- fiddle
- Vicki Hampton- background vocals
- Tony Harrell- keyboards, organ, piano, Wurlitzer
- Troy Lancaster- electric guitar
- Tim Lauer- organ, piano
- Gary Morse- steel guitar, dobro
- Billy Panda- acoustic guitar
- Tony Paoletta- steel guitar
- Jason Roller- fiddle, acoustic guitar, mandolin
- Ilya Toshinsky- banjo, bouzouki, acoustic guitar

== Chart performance ==
=== Album ===
Chart (2008)	Peak position
US Top Country Albums (Billboard)	5
US Billboard 200	32

=== Singles ===
Year	Single	Peak chart positions	
Year	Single	US Country	US
2008	"Holler Back"	9	66
2008	"How 'bout You Don't"	17	104
2009	"Country Folks Livin' Loud"	36	—
"—" denotes releases that did not chart
