= Love Is Everything (George Strait album) =

Studio album by George Strait
- Released: May 14, 2013
- Studios: Sound Stage Studios, Starstruck Studios and Westwood Studios (Nashville, Tennessee); Stonehurst Studios (Bowling Green, Kentucky).
- Genres: Neotraditional country; Western swing
- Length: 48:47
- Label: MCA Nashville
- Producers: Tony Brown; George Strait

George Strait chronology
| Icon 2 (2011) | Love Is Everything (2013) | The Cowboy Rides Away: Live from AT&T Stadium (2014) |

Singles from Love Is Everything
- 1. "Give It All We Got Tonight" Released: October 29, 2012; 2. "I Believe" Released: July 15, 2013; 3. "I Got a Car" Released: November 4, 2013

Love Is Everything is the twenty-eighth studio album by American country music artist George Strait. It was released on May 14, 2013 via MCA Nashville. Lead-off single "Give It All We Got Tonight" was released October 29, 2012 and became a top-10 single. Strait co-produced the album with his long-time producer Tony Brown. The album release was accompanied by a Spring 2014 concert tour, The Cowboy Rides Away Tour.

== Content ==
This was the last album of Strait's career to feature Tony Brown, who has produced all of Strait's albums since 1992.

Love Is Everything features 13 original songs including four written or co-written by Strait along with his son Bubba and songwriter Dean Dillon.

"I Just Can't Go On Dying Like This", written by Strait, was previously recorded for the Ace in the Hole Band in 1976 and included on Strait's Strait Out of the Box box set in 1995.

== Critical reception ==
Professional ratings
Aggregate scores
| Source | Rating |
|---|---|
| Metacritic | 75/100 |
Review scores
| Source | Rating |
| AllMusic | 3/5 stars |
| Country Weekly | B+ |
| Los Angeles Times | 3/4 stars |
| Roughstock | 3/5 stars |
| The Salt Lake Tribune | B− |
| Taste of Country | 3/5 stars |
| USA Today | 4/4 stars |

Love Is Everything received generally positive reviews from music critics. At Metacritic, they assigns a weighted average score out of 100 to reviews and ratings from mainstream critics, the album received a metascore of 75, based on 5 reviews.

At Country Weekly, Bob Paxman told that the album "further showcases George's smooth voice and, perhaps more importantly, his uncanny knack for picking outstanding songs." Mikael Wood of Los Angeles Times called the release "completely devastating" because it contains "carefully rendered and unabashed in its optimism, it's as personal as anything Strait has ever recorded." The Salt Lake Tribune found that "Strait risks nothing", which is not necessarily a good or bad thing because he has "a voice that is deeper than the Marianas Trench with the right amount of twang, in the end, Strait needs no exclamation points, and still is appealing." At USA Today, Brian Mansfield claimed that Strait "hasn't lost a step in the studio." Daryl Addison of Great American Country noted that the release is "an insightful and sentimental chapter to George's continuing legacy." At Billboard, Chuck Dauphin gave a positive review, when he affirmed that "truly [this] is an album worth giving a listen to, and then, and then again." Jeffrey B. Remz at Country Standard Time said that "George Strait continues to age very well."

However, Stephen Thomas Erlewine of Allmusic wrote that the release "isn't necessarily ambitious," but at the same time "it is remarkably satisfying." Roughstock's Dan MacIntosh alluded to how that "much like the old saying about how the worst day of fishing is always better than the best day of work, even a subpar George Strait album is likely better than much of what’s heard on today’s radio." At Taste of Country, Billy Dukes evoked that the effort is "hampered by a strong sameness."

== Commercial performance ==
Love Is Everything debuted at No.2 on the Billboard 200 chart and No.1 on the Country Albums chart with 125,000 copies. The album was Strait's 18th top 10 album on the Billboard 200 chart, tying him with Paul McCartney for the fourth-most top 10 albums among male artists in history; only Frank Sinatra (33), Elvis Presley (27), and Bob Dylan (20) have had more top 10 albums. Love Is Everything is Strait's 25th No. 1 album on the Country Albums chart, extending his record for the most No. 1 albums on that list; Willie Nelson and Merle Haggard are tied for second place with 15 No. 1 albums each. "Love is Everything" was certified Gold on July 17, 2014, making this Strait's 39th career album to be certified Gold by the RIAA, and giving him the 6th highest tally of Gold albums in history behind Elvis Presley, Barbra Streisand, The Beatles, The Rolling Stones and Neil Diamond. As of September 2014, the album had sold 456,400 copies in the US.

== Track listing ==
| No. | Title | Writer(s) | Length |
|---|---|---|---|
| 1. | "I Got a Car" | Tom Douglas, Keith Gattis | 4:32 |
| 2. | "Blue Melodies" | Gattis, Wyatt Earp | 4:26 |
| 3. | "Give It All We Got Tonight" | Mark Bright, Tim James, Phil O’Donnell | 4:11 |
| 4. | "I Just Can't Go On Dying Like This" | George Strait | 3:57 |
| 5. | "I Thought I Heard My Heart Sing" | L. Russell Brown, Bill Kenner | 2:59 |
| 6. | "That's What Breaking Hearts Do" | G. Strait, Bubba Strait | 3:30 |
| 7. | "When Love Comes Around Again" | Monty Holmes, Donny Kees, Jeff Silvey | 3:33 |
| 8. | "The Night Is Young" | Dean Dillon, B. Strait, G. Strait | 3:32 |
| 9. | "Sittin' on the Fence" | Gattis, Roger Creager | 3:27 |
| 10. | "I Believe" | Dillon, B. Strait, G. Strait | 3:46 |
| 11. | "Love Is Everything" | Pat McLaughlin, Casey Beathard | 3:07 |
| 12. | "You Don't Know What You're Missing" | Al Anderson, Chris Stapleton | 3:43 |
| 13. | "When the Credits Roll" | Steve Bogard, Kyle Jacobs, Randy Montana | 3:18 |
| Total length: | | | 48:47 |

== Personnel ==
- George Strait – lead vocals, background vocals, acoustic guitar
- Gordon Mote – acoustic piano
- Steve Nathan – keyboards, acoustic piano, Wurlitzer electric piano, Hammond B3 organ, synthesizer horns
- Matt Rollings – acoustic piano, Wurlitzer electric piano, Hammond B3 organ
- Steve Gibson – acoustic guitar, electric guitar
- Brent Mason – acoustic guitar, electric guitar
- Mac McAnally – acoustic guitar
- Ilya Toshinsky – acoustic guitar, electric guitar, ukulele
- Mike Johnson – dobro, steel guitar
- Paul Franklin – steel guitar
- Stuart Duncan – fiddle, mandolin
- Aubrey Haynie – fiddle, mandolin
- Michael Rhodes – bass guitar
- Glenn Worf – bass guitar, upright bass
- Eddie Bayers – drums
- Eric Darken – percussion
- Chris Carmichael – strings (1), string arrangements (1)
- Bergen White – string arrangements and conductor (4, 10)
- Carl Gorodetzky – string contractor (4, 10)
- The Nashville String Machine – strings (4, 10)
- Mickey Jack Cones – background vocals
- Thom Flora – background vocals
- Morgane Hayes – background vocals
- Wes Hightower – background vocals
- Marty Slayton – background vocals
- Chris Stapleton – background vocals

=== Production ===
- Brian White – A&R
- Tony Brown – producer
- George Strait – producer
- Chuck Ainlay – recording, mixing
- Kam Lutcherhand – recording assistant
- Brandon Schexnayder – recording assistant, additional recording, mix assistant
- Kyle Lehning – additional recording
- Chris Carmichael – additional recording
- Mickey Jack Cones – additional recording
- Casey Wood – additional recording assistant
- Brian David Willis – digital editing
- Bob Ludwig – mastering at Gateway Mastering (Portland, Maine)
- Amy Garges – production assistant
- Craig Allen – art direction, design
- Art Streiber – photography
- Melissa Schleicher – grooming
- Victoria Case – wardrobe
- Erv Woolsey – management

== Charts ==
=== Weekly charts ===
| Chart (2013) | Peak position |
|---|---|
| Canadian Albums (Billboard) | 8 |
| U.S. Billboard 200 | 2 |
| U.S. Billboard Top Country Albums | 1 |

=== Year-end charts ===
| Chart (2013) | Position |
|---|---|
| US Billboard 200 | 77 |
| US Top Country Albums (Billboard) | 20 |

| Chart (2014) | Position |
|---|---|
| US Top Country Albums (Billboard) | 37 |

=== Singles ===
| Year | Single | Peak chart positions | | | | |
| Year | Single | US Country | US Country Airplay | US | CAN Country | CAN |
|---|---|---|---|---|---|---|
| 2012 | "Give It All We Got Tonight" | 1 | 2 | 43 | 30 | 72 |
| 2013 | "I Believe" | — | 50 | — | — | — |
| 2013 | "I Got a Car" | 23 | 17 | 89 | 39 | — |
"—" denotes releases that did not chart

== Certifications ==
Certifications for Love Is Everything
| Region | Certification | Certified units/sales |
|---|---|---|
| United States (RIAA) | Gold | 500,000^{^} |
^{^} Shipments figures based on certification alone.
