= Holler Back (song) =

Single by The Lost Trailers

from the album Holler Back
- Released: February 4, 2008
- Recorded: 2008
- Genre: Country
- Length: 3:14
- Label: BNA
- Songwriters: Tim James, Stokes Nielson
- Producer: Brett Beavers

The Lost Trailers singles chronology
"Why Me" (2006)	"Holler Back" (2008)	"How 'bout You Don't" (2008)

"Holler Back" is a song written by Stokes Nielson and Tim James, and recorded by American country music band The Lost Trailers. The song is the band's fourth chart single on the Billboard Hot Country Songs charts, and their first Top 40 hit on that chart. It was released in February 2008 as the title track and lead-off single to their album Holler Back, released in August 2008 on BNA Records.

== Content ==
"Holler Back" is an up-tempo in which the narrator describes his feeling out of place in an urban setting. In the first verse, he mentions a friend who tells him to "holler back when [he gets] back home", although the narrator says that the only "holler back" that he knows is "that holler back in the woods". This line refers to the Southern American English word "holler", a slang term for a hollow or valley. In the second verse, he describes a woman named Mary Jo who lives in the hollow.

== Critical reception ==
Jim Malec of The 9513 gave the song a "thumbs down" rating, as he thought that it "poke[d] fun" at Gwen Stefani's "Hollaback Girl", but since "Holler Back" was released three years after Stefani's song, he called it "an opportunity lost to very poor timing". He also called "Holler Back" "an incredibly tight track with a John Rich-worthy hook ... which showcases guitarist Stokes Nielson's spot-on ... under-appreciated songwriting talent."

== Music video ==
The song's music video was directed by Tyson Wisbrock. It was filmed in downtown Grand Rapids, Michigan in front of La Grande Vitesse and during a concert at a local music venue.

== Chart performance ==
The song debuted at number 60 on the Hot Country Songs chart dated February 23, 2008, and fell from the chart the week after. However, it re-entered at number 48 on the chart dated March 15, 2008 and later entered Top Ten on the country charts dated for August 23, 2008. After thirty-one weeks on the chart, it reached a peak of number 9.

Chart (2008)	Peak position
US Hot Country Songs (Billboard)	9
US Billboard Hot 100	66

=== Year-end charts ===
Chart (2008)	Position
US Country Songs (Billboard)	33
