= Welcome to the Woods =

Studio album by the Lost Trailers
- Released: April 20, 2004
- Genre: Country
- Length: 55:19
- Label: Republic/Universal South
- Producer: The Lost Trailers & others

The Lost Trailers chronology
Trailer Trash (2002)	Welcome to the Woods (2004)	The Lost Trailers (2006)

Welcome to the Woods is the third studio album by the American country music band the Lost Trailers, released on Universal South/Republic Records on April 20, 2004. The album produced one single, "Down in the Valley", written by Scott Claassen and Ross Flournoy, that failed to enter the Hot Country Songs chart.

== Track listing ==
All songs written by Stokes Nielson, unless noted otherwise.

No.	Title	Writer(s)	Length
1.	"Long Fall"		3:31
2.	"Down in the Valley"	Scott Claassen, Ross Flournoy	3:13
3.	"Atlanta"		2:18
4.	"Mary"		3:53
5.	"Walking Blind"	Ryder Lee, Nielson	4:01
6.	"Averly Jane"		5:23
7.	"The Battery"		4:06
8.	"Love and War (In a Small Town)"		4:22
9.	"Bad Habit"		2:52
10.	"Overcrowded Town"		3:18
11.	"Yellow Rose"		3:54
12.	"West End"		4:49
13.	"Sitting on Top of the World"		3:45
14.	"Fire on the Pontchartrain"		5:54

== Personnel ==
As listed in liner notes.

=== The Lost Trailers ===
- Ryder Lee - piano, Hammond organ, background vocals
- Manny Medina - acoustic guitar, background vocals
- Andrew Nielson - bass guitar, background vocals
- Stokes Nielson - electric guitar, lead vocals
- Jeff Potter - drums, background vocals

=== Additional musicians ===
- Denny Fongheiser - drums
- Dave Francis - bass guitar
- Mickey Raphael - harmonica on "Yellow Rose"
- Stacey Williams - background vocals on "Averly Jane", "The Battery" and "West End"
- The Section Quartet - strings on "Atlanta" and "Sitting on Top of the World"
  - Daphne Chen - violin
  - Richard Dodd - cello
  - Eric Gorfain - violin
  - Leah Katz - viola
