= Cold Beer Conversation (song) =

Single by George Strait

from the album Cold Beer Conversation
- Released: September 23, 2015
- Genre: Country
- Length: 3:49
- Label: MCA Nashville
- Songwriter(s): Al Anderson; Ben Hayslip; Jimmy Yeary
- Producer(s): Chuck Ainlay; George Strait

George Strait singles chronology
"Let It Go" (2015)	"Cold Beer Conversation" (2015)	"Goin' Goin' Gone" (2016)

"Cold Beer Conversation" is a song recorded by American country music artist George Strait. It was released as the second single from his 28th studio album of the same name. The song was written by Al Anderson, Jimmy Yeary and Ben Hayslip.

== Critical reception ==
Kevin John Coyne of 'Country Universe' rated Cold Beer Conversation a B+. He states, the "new single captures the “take it as it comes” attitude toward life, but this time with somber resignation as the dominant feeling." "...things like realizing your parents are quickly aging or that your own youth isn't coming back around again." "Life passes by until it’s passed you by."

== Chart and sales performance ==
Chart (2015)	Peak position
Canada Country (Billboard)	43
US Country Airplay (Billboard)	33
US Hot Country Songs (Billboard)	36
