= I Believe (George Strait song) =

Single by George Strait

from the album Love Is Everything
- Released: July 15, 2013
- Genre: Country
- Length: 3:46
- Label: MCA Nashville
- Songwriters: Dean Dillon; Bubba Strait; George Strait
- Producers: Tony Brown; George Strait

George Strait singles chronology
"Give It All We Got Tonight" (2012)	"I Believe" (2013)	"I Got a Car" (2013)

"I Believe" is a song recorded by American country music singer George Strait. It was written by Strait, his son Bubba, and Dean Dillon. It was released on July 15, 2013, as the second single from his album Love Is Everything.

== Content ==
Strait and his band had finished recording the album when Norma, George's wife, made everyone unpack and cut the single, which was inspired by the victims of the Sandy Hook Elementary school shooting. Reviewers noted that "At its core, ‘I Believe’ is about faith — a subject this singer has approached with underrated deftness" and that Strait "puts his faith on display as never before." Strait was initially hesitant to include the song on the album for fear of misrepresenting the families of the victims or profiting off of them.

== Critical reception ==
Billy Dukes of Taste of Country rated "I Believe" 4.5 out of 5 stars and calls it "arguably the best of the 13" and shouldn't keep him from earning a Song of the Year consideration.

Leeann Ward of Country Universe gave the song an A. She states, "Strait’s voice is as solid as ever" and that "he perfectly emotes the sincerity and compassion that a song of this magnitude requires." She finishes by saying "I Believe" is "just a tribute from a humble man conveying a simple sentiment of real heartbreak, buoyed by faith and hope."

== Chart performance ==
"I Believe" debuted and peaked at number 50 on the U.S. Billboard Country Airplay chart for the week of August 3, 2013, making it the first single of Strait's career to miss the Top 40.

Chart (2013)	Peak position
US Country Airplay (Billboard)	50

== Later uses ==
Performed as the last song of Hand in Hand: A Benefit for Hurricane Relief it was, by Strait and others, in September 2017, in the wake of Hurricane Harvey and Hurricane Irma.
