= I Got a Car =

Single by George Strait

from the album Love Is Everything
- Released: November 4, 2013
- Genre: Country
- Length: 4:32 (album version); 3:50 (radio edit)
- Label: MCA Nashville
- Songwriters: Tom Douglas; Keith Gattis
- Producers: Tony Brown; George Strait

George Strait singles chronology
"I Believe" (2013)	"I Got a Car" (2013)	"Let It Go" (2015)

"I Got a Car" is a song recorded by American country music artist George Strait. It was written by Tom Douglas and Keith Gattis. It was released November 4, 2013, as the third single from his album Love Is Everything.

== Content ==
Strait was pitched the song by his son, Bubba, who was given a CD by one of his rodeo friends. Strait states, “I took it home and I laid it on the coffee table, and it sat there for two or three weeks," “He asked me about it one day, and I said, ‘Naw, I haven’t heard it yet, but I will when I get back home.’ I got it and stuck it in the player and started listening to it. This song was on there, along with a couple of others.”

== Critical reception ==
Taste of Country gave the song a positive review, stating that "'I Got a Car' is another easy love story, just as Strait has done dozens of times before. It's a circle-of-life adventure revolving around a car, presumably the same car in each verse. Expect nothing out of the ordinary from this track from the ‘Love Is Everything’ album." Mark Erickson of Roughstock said "the song is contemporary while still distinctly a George Strait song. Exactly the kind of song radio should wanna play."

== Chart performance ==
"I Got a Car" debuted at number 56 on the U.S. Billboard Country Airplay chart. It also debuted at number 50 on the U.S. Billboard Hot Country Songs chart for the week of December 7, 2013. It was certified gold for sales of 500,000 copies on 12/17/2014 by the RIAA.

Chart (2013–2014)	Peak position
Canada Country (Billboard)	39
US Billboard Hot 100	89
US Country Airplay (Billboard)	17
US Hot Country Songs (Billboard)	23

=== Year-end charts ===
Chart (2014)	Position
US Country Airplay (Billboard)	67
US Hot Country Songs (Billboard)	71

== Certifications ==
Region	Certification	Certified units/sales
United States (RIAA)	Platinum	1,000,000^{‡}
^{‡} Sales+streaming figures based on certification alone.
