= The Lost Trailers (album) =

Studio album by The Lost Trailers
- Released: August 29, 2006
- Genre: Country
- Label: BNA
- Producer: Blake Chancey; Ryder Lee; Stokes Nielson

The Lost Trailers chronology
Welcome to the Woods (2004)	The Lost Trailers (2006)	Holler Back (2008)

Singles from The Lost Trailers
- 1. "Call Me Crazy" Released: 2006; 2. "Why Me" Released: 2006

The Lost Trailers is the fourth studio album of American country music group The Lost Trailers. It was released to BNA Records on August 29, 2006. It produced two singles: "Call Me Crazy" and "Why Me", which peaked at number 43 and number 45, respectively, on the Hot Country Songs charts.

Blake Chancey produced the album, with additional co-production from group members Ryder Lee and Stokes Nielson on "Gravy".

== Critical reception ==
Professional ratings
Review scores
Source	Rating
Allmusic	3/5 stars
Country Standard Time	mixed

Jeff Tamarkin of Allmusic rated the album 3 out of 5 stars, praising the band's sound and concluding, "Although the Lost Trailers veer at times (though not often enough for it to be a problem) toward cliché lyrically, and bar-band generics in their song structures, there's no mistaking the honesty inherent in this music." Dan McIntosh of Country Standard Time gave a mixed review, noting the band's rock influences but criticizing the song choices by saying, "The Lost Trailers are a little bit like the dwelling places they're named after: they're functional for travel or as a temporary residences, but most listeners will not want to live in 'em."

== Track listing ==
All tracks are written by Stokes Nielson except where noted.

No.	Title	Writer(s)	Length
1.	"Call Me Crazy"		3:32
2.	"Why Me"	Jimbeau Hinson, Nielson	3:51
3.	"I'm a Country Man"		3:14
4.	"Summer of Love"		3:31
5.	"Dixie Boy Special"	Hinson, David Lee Murphy, Nielson	3:20
6.	"All This Love"	Gary Nicholson, Paul Overstreet, Jon Randall	4:13
7.	"Hey Baby"		2:57
8.	"The Only One"		3:36
9.	"Tell Me"	Ryder Lee, Nielson	3:44
10.	"Gravy"		3:34
11.	"Simple Life"	Zac Brown, Nielson	4:51

== Personnel ==
=== The Lost Trailers ===
- Ryder Lee - acoustic guitar, keyboards, background vocals
- Manny Medina - bass guitar, electric guitar, background vocals
- Andrew Nielson - bass guitar, harmonica, keyboards, background vocals
- Stokes Nielson - electric guitar, lead vocals
- Jeff Potter - drums, background vocals

=== Additional Musicians ===
- Nanette Bohannon - background vocals
- Pat Buchanan - electric guitar
- Joe Chemay - bass guitar
- Lisa Cochran - background vocals
- Perry Coleman - background vocals
- Steve Ebe - drums
- Mel Eubanks - banjo
- Rusty Golden - keyboards
- Vicki Hampton - background vocals
- Tony Harrell - keyboards
- Wes Hightower - background vocals
- George Marinelli Jr. - electric guitar
- Mark Matejka - slide guitar
- David Lee Murphy - background vocals
- Billy Panda - acoustic guitar
- Tony Paoletta - steel guitar
- Cindy Richardson-Walker - background vocals

== Chart performance ==
=== Album ===
Chart (2006)	Peak position
U.S. Billboard Top Country Albums	46
U.S. Billboard Top Heatseekers	16

=== Singles ===
Year	Single	Peak chart positions
Year	Single	US Country
2006	"Call Me Crazy"	43
2006	"Why Me"	45
