= How 'bout You Don't =

Single by The Lost Trailers

from the album Holler Back
- Released: October 13, 2008
- Genre: Country
- Length: 2:41
- Label: BNA
- Songwriters: Stokes Nielson; Vicky McGehee; Jeremy Stover
- Producer: Brett Beavers

The Lost Trailers singles chronology
"Holler Back" (2008)	"How 'bout You Don't" (2008)	"Country Folks (Livin' Loud)" (2009)

"How 'bout You Don't" is a song written by Stokes Nielson, Jeremy Stover and Vicky McGehee, and recorded by American country music band The Lost Trailers. The song was the band's fifth chart single on the Billboard Hot Country Songs charts. It was released in October 2008 as the second single to their album Holler Back, released in August 2008 on BNA Records.

== Content ==
The song a mid-tempo in which the male narrator is trying to persuade a lover not to leave by saying "how 'bout you don't."

== Critical reception ==
In his review of Holler Back, Engine 145 critic Brady Vercher said of the song, "the song features one of the more compelling arguments ever concocted to persuade a disenchanted lover not to leave: 'how bout you don’t.' And Lee sings it with enough conviction to make it possible that it might actually work until you realize how retarded it is." Robert Loy of Country Standard Time, in his review of the album, called the song "a simple but eloquent plea for another chance."

== Music video ==
A video was filmed in April 2009 and was directed by Tyson Wisbrock, who also directed their previous video "Holler Back." It features the band playing the song in the middle of the desert, and was partially filmed in Las Vegas.

== Chart performance ==
The song debuted at number 54 on the U.S. Billboard Hot Country Songs chart for the week of October 25, 2008.

Chart (2008–2009)	Peak position
US Hot Country Songs (Billboard)	17
US Bubbling Under Hot 100 (Billboard)	4
