= Let It Go (George Strait song) =

Single by George Strait

from the album Cold Beer Conversation
- Released: April 20, 2015
- Genre: Country
- Length: 3:33
- Label: MCA Nashville
- Songwriter(s): George Strait; Bubba Strait; Keith Gattis
- Producer(s): Chuck Ainlay; George Strait

George Strait singles chronology
"I Got a Car" (2013)	"Let It Go" (2015)	"Cold Beer Conversation" (2015)

"Let It Go" is a song recorded by American country music artist George Strait. Strait co-wrote it with his son Bubba Strait and Keith Gattis. It was released April 20, 2015, as the lead-off single from his 28th studio album Cold Beer Conversation.

== Critical reception ==
Taste of Country gave the song a positive review, stating that the song "works to sever all emotional ties that often leave one bound up and anxious" and that Strait's "mellow voice serves this easy-to-embrace country song well." He also favorably compared it to Strait's own "The Seashores of Old Mexico" and Kenny Chesney songs from the early 2000s.

== Chart performance ==
Chart (2015)	Peak position
US Bubbling Under Hot 100 Singles (Billboard)	18
US Country Airplay (Billboard)	46
US Hot Country Songs (Billboard)	29
