= Hand in Hand: A Benefit for Hurricane Relief =

- Genre: Benefit concert
- Country of origin: United States
- Original language: English

Production
- Running time: 1 hour

Original release
- Release: September 12, 2017

Hand in Hand: A Benefit for Hurricane Relief was a one-hour, commercial-free benefit concert television special that aired simulcast in the United States on September 12, 2017, at 8 p.m. ET/CT live from New York City, Nashville, San Antonio, and Los Angeles and tape delayed MT and PT.

During the hour it was on the air, the special raised $14 million for the relief efforts from the aftermath of Hurricane Harvey and Hurricane Irma. By evening's end the total was up to $44 million. Organizations benefitting the relief include the United Way of Greater Houston, Rebuild Texas Fund, ASPCA, Habitat for Humanity, Best Friends, Direct Relief, Save the Children, Feeding Texas, Feeding Florida, and the Mayor's Fund for Hurricane Harvey Relief. On October 17, 2017, it was announced that benefits would now also go to the victims of Hurricane Maria, which occurred the week after the concert. The Hand in Hand Fund is managed by Comic Relief, Inc.

The concert was produced Scooter Braun and SB Projects, the same team who organized the One Love Manchester benefit with Ariana Grande.

To date, the benefit has raised over $55 million in donations.

== Musical performances ==
- "Lean on Me" – Stevie Wonder with Victoria White, Marquist Taylor and Houston gospel choir
- "Stand by Me" – Usher and Blake Shelton
- "Hallelujah" (bilingual in the John Cale arrangement) – Tori Kelly and Luis Fonsi
- "Mercy" – Dave Matthews
- "With a Little Help From My Friends" (in the Joe Cocker arrangement) – Demi Lovato, Brad Paisley, Darius Rucker, and CeCe Winans
- "Texas" and "I Believe" – George Strait, Miranda Lambert, Chris Stapleton, Lyle Lovett, and Robert Earl Keen

== Spoken segments ==
- Beyoncé
- Justin Bieber
- Cher
- George Clooney
- Billy Crystal
- Robert De Niro
- Leonardo DiCaprio
- Jimmy Fallon
- Jamie Foxx
- Jennifer Garner
- Selena Gomez
- Tom Hanks
- Taraji P. Henson
- Dwayne Johnson
- Nicole Kidman
- Matthew McConaughey
- Dennis Quaid
- Julia Roberts
- Will Smith
- Gwen Stefani
- Barbra Streisand
- Justin Timberlake
- Sofía Vergara
- Kerry Washington
- Oprah Winfrey
- Reese Witherspoon

== Venues ==
- Times Square Studios, New York City
- Universal Studios Hollywood, Los Angeles
- Grand Ole Opry, Nashville, Tennessee
- Majestic Theatre, San Antonio

== Broadcast networks ==
=== United States ===
==== Television ====
- ABC
- BET
- Bravo
- CBS
- CMT
- E!
- Fox
- MTV
- NBC
- Oxygen
- Univision

==== Radio ====
- iHeartRadio
- Sirius XM

== Viewing figures ==
Air Date	Broadcast Network	United States				Source
Air Date	Broadcast Network	18–49 (rating/share)	Viewers (millions)	Rank (timeslot)	Rank (night)	Source
September 12, 2017	NBC	1.1/5	6.09	1	2	
September 12, 2017	ABC	0.7/3	3.95	2	3	
September 12, 2017	CBS	0.6/3	4.03	3	4	
September 12, 2017	Fox	0.4/2	1.59	4	7	

== See also ==
- Shelter from the Storm: A Concert for the Gulf Coast (2005)
- Hurricane Sandy: Coming Together (2012)
