= Hurricane Sandy: Coming Together =

- Genre: Benefit concert
- Starring: Christina Aguilera; Jon Bon Jovi; Billy Joel; Jimmy Fallon; Steven Tyler; Joe Perry; Brad Whitford; Sting; Mary J. Blige; Bruce Springsteen
- Country of origin: United States
- Original language: English

Production
- Running time: 1 hour

Original release
- Release: November 2, 2012

Hurricane Sandy: Coming Together was a one-hour, commercial-free benefit concert television special that aired simulcast in the United States on November 2, 2012 at 8 p.m. ET/CT live from New York City and tape delayed MT and PT. The special raised money for the relief efforts from the aftermath of Hurricane Sandy, which had struck the U.S. Northeast four days earlier. All proceeds went to the American Red Cross.

== Production ==
The concert was an effort of NBC and its affiliated channels, and its origins lay with Today show anchor Matt Lauer suggesting it to NBCUniversal CEO Steve Burke. It featured appearances and musical performances mostly by those associated with the affected areas, especially New Jersey and New York. At least one, Long Island's Billy Joel, had properties damaged by the storm. Organization for the production was put together in a hurry, in the face of logistical and transportation difficulties in the wake of the storm.

The event took place at The Dr. Oz Show's Studio 6A at the NBC Studios in 30 Rockefeller Plaza in New York before a small audience. The event followed somewhat in the manner and format of Shelter from the Storm: A Concert for the Gulf Coast, which raised money for the relief efforts from the aftermath of Hurricane Katrina in 2005, and other recent disaster relief telethons.

Approximately $23 million was raised by Hurricane Sandy: Coming Together for the American Red Cross.

== Musical guests and performances ==
The running order of musical performances was:

- Christina Aguilera, "Beautiful"
- Jon Bon Jovi, "Who Says You Can't Go Home"/"Livin' on a Prayer"
- Billy Joel, "Miami 2017 (Seen the Lights Go Out on Broadway)"
- Jimmy Fallon, Steven Tyler and Billy Joel (piano and vocals), with Bruce Springsteen (guitar and backing vocals) and Mark Rivera (backing vocals), "Under the Boardwalk"
- Steven Tyler, Joe Perry and Brad Whitford (all from Aerosmith), "Dream On"
- Sting, "Message in a Bottle"
- Mary J. Blige, "The Living Proof"
- Bruce Springsteen and the E Street Band, "Land of Hope and Dreams"/"People Get Ready"

Spoken appearances were made by Matt Lauer, Tina Fey, Jimmy Fallon, Jon Stewart, Brian Williams, Danny DeVito, Al Roker, Whoopi Goldberg, and Kevin Bacon. Clips from NBC News were also aired, showing some of the physical and emotional devastation the storm had caused.

Some of the musical acts made their own remarks before their songs, including Aguilera, who opened the show by stating that she was born in Staten Island. Performances were generally stripped-down arrangements of old songs that either reflected feelings of distress or expressed sympathy and offered hope and encouragement; Rolling Stone wrote that the songs "sometimes seemed written for the occasion". In addition, Joel and Blige both modified their songs' lyrics to fit what had taken place. Some microphone failures marked the group rendition of "Under the Boardwalk", the main lead vocal for which was given to Fallon, inspiring a bit of jocularity in the otherwise somber program.

== Broadcast networks ==
=== United States ===
==== Broadcasters ====
- NBC

==== Cable and satellite ====
- MSNBC
- Bravo
- CNBC
- E!
- G4
- Style Network
- USA Network
- NBC Sports Network
- Syfy
- The Weather Channel
- Universal HD
- Comcast Network
- HBO
- Sirius Satellite Radio

==== Radio ====
- New Jersey 101.5
- The Breeze 99.7
- 92.5 XTU
- B-103.1
- 107.1 The Peak
- B101 FM
- Q104.3

== See also ==
- 12-12-12: The Concert for Sandy Relief
- Hand in Hand: A Benefit for Hurricane Relief (2017)
