= Ace in the Hole Band =

Backup band for country music performer George Strait

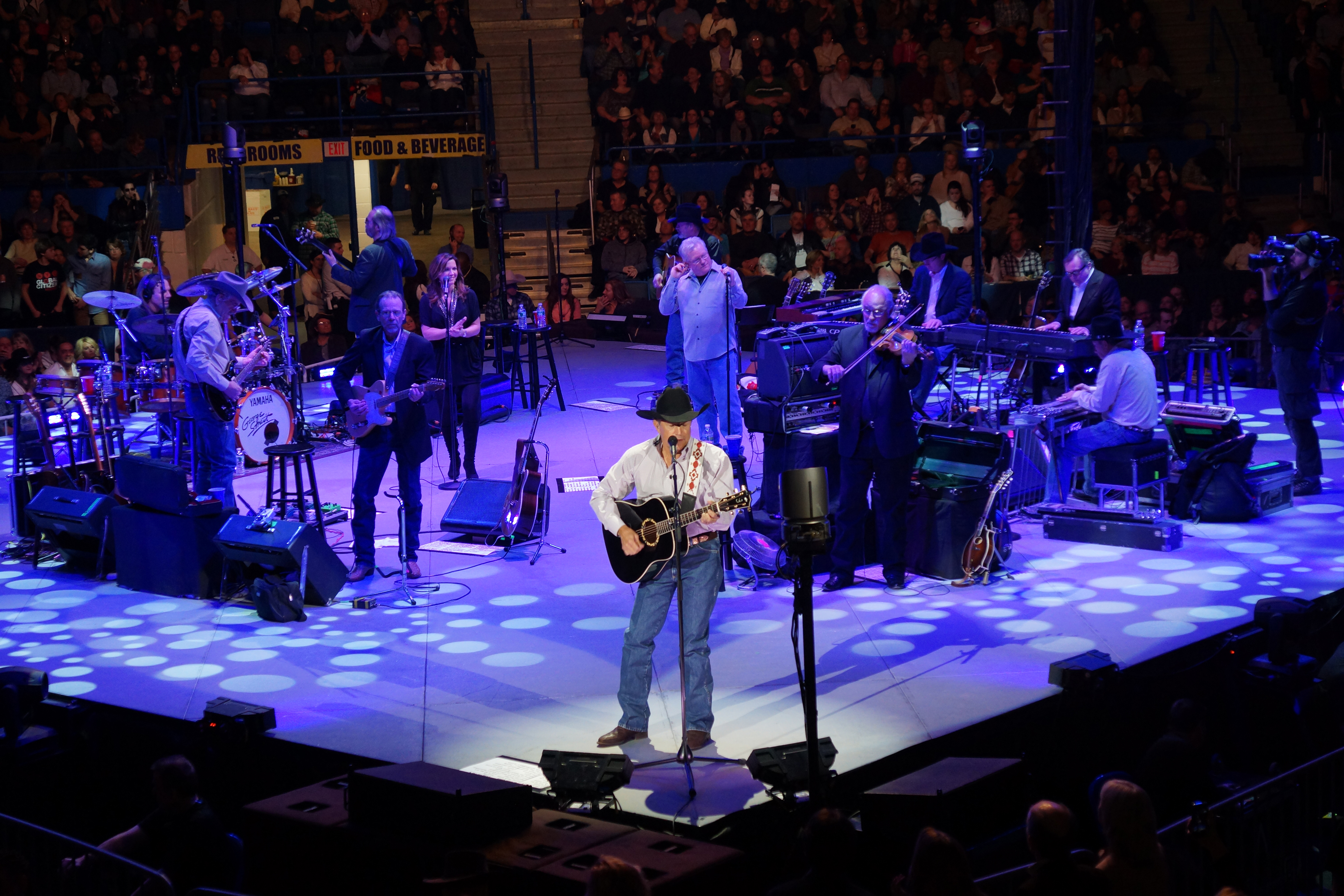
- George Strait and the Ace in the Hole Band in Hartford, Connecticut, 2013

Background information
- Also known as: Stoney Ridge
- Origin: San Marcos, Texas, United States
- Genres: Alternative country; neotraditional country; Western swing
- Years active: 1975–present
- Labels: D Records; MCA; Texas World
- Members: George Strait; Terry Hale; Mike Daily; Ron Huckaby; Rick McRae; Benny McArthur; Joe Manuel; John Michael Whitby; Marty Slayton; Tony King; Jenee Fleenor; Bobby Jarzombek
- Past members: David Anthony; Ron Cabal; Ted Stubblefield; Tommy Foote; Jay Dominguez; Bill Mabry; Roger Montgomery; Jeff Sturms; Thom Flora; Mike Kennedy; Gene Elders; Wes Hightower

Ace in the Hole Band is the backup band for American country music performer George Strait, who was the band's lead singer before beginning his solo career in the early 1980s. The band formed at San Marcos, Texas in the 1970s, and recorded several singles for "D Records" including the Strait-penned "I Just Can't Go on Dying Like This" and "I Don't Want to Talk It Over Anymore". After Strait attained status as the "King of Country", the group released an album of its own in 1995 featuring vocals from Darrell McCall and Mel Tillis.

The band, originally known as "Stoney Ridge", performs such styles of traditional country music as honky-tonk and Western swing and were influenced by such performers as Bob Wills, Johnny Bush, and The Strangers. Contemporaries of the band include Asleep at the Wheel and Jerry Jeff Walker.

== Background ==
=== Origins ===
The Ace in the Hole Band derived from the band "Stoney Ridge," which was composed of Southwest Texas State University (now Texas State) students Ron Cabal (lead guitar), Mike Daily (steel guitar), Terry Hale (Bass guitar), Tommy Foote (drums) and Jay Dominguez (lead vocals). Dominguez and Foote left the band after graduating in 1975, prompting a search for a new singer. The band members posted bulletins around the campus of Southwest Texas. One was noticed by an agricultural science student, George Strait. He contacted the band and was hired after an audition. Soon after, the group was renamed "Ace in the Hole" and George quickly became the lead singer.

The band regularly performed at Cheatham Street Warehouse in San Marcos, Texas, where they debuted on October 13, 1975 along with new member Ted Stubblefield, who temporarily replaced Foote as the drummer. Acts such as Asleep at the Wheel and Jerry Jeff Walker also played at the forum. The band appeared at the locale nearly every week until the early 1980s, when they began touring with Strait. Drummer Foote returned to the lineup late in 1975 and remained as drummer until 1983 when he relinquished his position to become the band's road manager. Tommy Foote died in May 2024.

=== Recording ===
In 1976, Pappy Daily, the grandfather of band member Mike Daily, decided to record the group for his "D Records" label at a studio in Houston, Texas. At the first session, the band recorded Dallas Frazier's "Honky Tonk Downstairs" (later recorded on Strait's 1981 debut album Strait Country) and the Strait-penned "I Just Can't Go on Dying Like This" (later recorded on Strait's 2013 album Love Is Everything). The songs were released to radio stations in Texas and Oklahoma. In 1977, Bill Mabry was added to the lineup as a fiddle player and the band recorded their second single, which featured the songs "Lonesome Rodeo Cowboy" (later recorded on Strait's 1990 album Livin' It Up) and "That Don’t Change the Way I Feel About You" which was written by Strait. The next year, the band recorded the songs "Right or Wrong," and "Little Liza Jane", which were later included on the 2005 D Records label release Complete D Singles Collection, Vol. 6: The Sounds of Houston, Texas. Strait re-recorded "Right or Wrong" in 1983 for his album Right or Wrong and took it to number one on the country charts. "The Loneliest Singer in Town" and Strait's "I Don’t Want to Talk It Over Anymore" also came out of this session. The three songs composed by Strait were later released on his 1995 compilation album Strait Out of the Box.

In 1981, after Strait signed with MCA Records, the band began to tour with him and played the instrumentals on his recordings. They were honored in 1991 with the SRO's "Touring Band of the Year." Four years later, the band released an album without vocals from Strait, featuring singers Darrell McCall and Mel Tillis.

== Style ==
The band plays in a honky-tonk and western swing style, and credits such performers as Bob Wills, Hank Williams, Johnny Bush, George Jones, Merle Haggard and The Strangers as influences. Allmusic describes the band's styles as Alternative country, Neotraditional and Western swing revival. Because of the group's traditional style, performances in the city of Austin, Texas did not occur often due to the city's demand for progressive sounds. Strait traveled to Nashville in 1977 with hopes of beginning a career, but most in the industry passed on him, shunning his traditional approach for pop-influenced sounds popular in country music during the late 1970s Urban Cowboy era.

== Members ==
=== Current members ===
- Mike Daily - steel guitar (1975–present)
- Terry Hale – bass (1975–present)
- Ron Huckaby – piano (1983–present)
- Rick McRae – lead guitar (1984–present)
- Benny McArthur – rhythm guitar, backing vocals, occasional fiddle (1984–present)
- Marty Slayton – backing vocals (2000–present)
- Joe Manuel - acoustic guitar, backing vocals (2005–present)
- John Michael Whitby – keyboards (2006–present)
- Bobby Jarzombek - drums (2021–present)
- Jenee Fleenor - fiddle (2024–present)
- Tony King - backing vocals (2024–present)
- George Strait - lead vocals (present)

=== Former Members ===
- Ron Cabal - lead guitar (1975–1983)
- George Strait – lead vocals, acoustic guitar (1975–1980)
- Ted Stubblefield – drums (1975)
- Tommy Foote – drums (1976–1982)
- Bill Mabry - fiddle (1977–1979)
- Richard Casanova - fiddle (1980–1984)
- Roger Montgomery – drums (1983–1986)
- Gene Elders – fiddle, mandolin (1985–2024; his death)
- David Anthony - acoustic guitar (1985–2002)
- Phillip Fajardo - drums (1987)
- Phil Fisher - drums (1988–1990)
- Mike Kennedy - drums (1991–2018; died 2018)
- Liana Manis – backing vocals (1999)
- Wes Hightower - backing vocals (1999-2006; 2016–2023)
- Jeff Sturms - acoustic guitar, mandolin (2002–2007); backing vocals (1998-2007); keyboards (1998-2002)
- Anthony Bazzani - keyboards (2002–2005)
- Thom Flora – backing vocals (2007–2016)
- Lonnie Wilson - drums (2019–2020)

== Discography ==
=== Singles ===
Year	Single	Album
1977	"I Just Can't Go On Dying Like This"	Strait Out of the Box (George Strait album)
1977	"Honky Tonk Downstairs"	Complete D Singles Collection, Vol. 6: The Sounds of Houston, Texas
1977	"Lonesome Rodeo Cowboy"	Complete D Singles Collection, Vol. 6: The Sounds of Houston, Texas
1977	"(That Don't Change The) Way I Feel About You"	Strait Out of the Box
1978	"I Don't Want To Talk It Over Anymore"	Strait Out of the Box
1978	"Loneliest Singer In Town"	Complete D Singles Collection, Vol. 6: The Sounds of Houston, Texas

=== Albums with George Strait ===
- Ocean Front Property, 1987
- Livin' It Up, 1990
- Chill of an Early Fall, 1991
- Holding My Own, 1992
- Strait Out of the Box, 1995
- For the Last Time, 2003
- Live at Texas Stadium, 2007
- The Cowboy Rides Away, 2014

=== Hit Singles with George Strait ===
- "Lovesick Blues", 1991
- "Gone as a Girl Can Get", 1992

=== Ace in the Hole Band (album) ===
Ace in the Hole Band

Studio album
- Released: April 16, 1995
- Genre: Western swing
- Length: 30:13
- Label: Texas World
- Producer: Billy Stull, Lucky Tomblin

The Ace in the Hole Band released their self-named debut album in 1995. Among its many covers, the album features the song "You're Something Special to Me," which was recorded by George Strait on his 1985 album Something Special.

Track list

No.	Title	Writer(s)	Length
1.	"Returning the Corn"	Rick McRae, Riff Ryder	2:45
2.	"You're Something Special to Me"	David Anthony	3:51
3.	"Mirrors Don't Lie"	Merle Haggard	3:14
4.	"What Comes Natural to a Fool"	Ronnie McCown	2:45
5.	"I'll Be Waiting Here Til Then"	Anthony, Benny McArthur, McRae	2:29
6.	"Texas Bounce"	Gene Elders, McRae	3:25
7.	"Back in the Swing of Things"	Anthony, McArthur	2:55
8.	"The Difference Between Me and Him Is You"	Gary Harrison, Tim Mensy	3:24
9.	"My Shoes Keep Walking Back to You"	Lee Ross, Bob Wills	2:50
10.	"I'm Ragged But I'm Right"	George Jones	2:32
