= Give It All We Got Tonight =

Single by George Strait

from the album Love Is Everything
- Released: October 29, 2012
- Genre: Country
- Length: 4:11 (album version); 3:44 (radio edit)
- Label: MCA Nashville
- Songwriters: Tim James; Phil O’Donnell; Mark Bright
- Producers: Tony Brown; George Strait

George Strait singles chronology
"Drinkin' Man" (2012)	"Give It All We Got Tonight" (2012)	"I Believe" (2013)

"Give It All We Got Tonight" is a song recorded by American country music singer George Strait. The song was written by Tim James, Phil O’Donnell, and Mark Bright. It was released on October 29, 2012, as the first single from his album Love Is Everything.

== Content ==
When asked about the song Strait stated, “The song has a very unusual melody and very cool phrasing, which I've always been drawn to.” It is in the key of G major with a chord pattern of G-D-Am-C.

== Critical reception ==
Billy Dukes of Taste of Country rated "Give It All We Got Tonight" 4.5 out of 5 stars. He states the song is a "...rarely matched romancer with more sensory cues than just about everything he’s ever cut. After just a single listen, one breathes in the smell of a summer shower garnished with sweet perfume or rugged cologne." He finishes with saying, "his best songs are timeless, seemingly capable of becoming a hit in the ’80s, ’90s or 2000s. Add ‘Give It All We Got Tonight’ to a list of his all-time classics."

Matt Bjorke of Roughstock also rated it 4.5 out of 5 stars. He states, "with "Give It All We Got Tonight," George showcases that he's still got it with this romantic tempo-filled ballad" and that it "finds George back in the pocket of Nashville's writers, a place where he's always been able to mine hits as a man with some of the best ears in Nashville."

== Commercial performance ==
"Give It All We Got Tonight" debuted on the Country Airplay chart at number 37 the week of November 17, 2012 and debuted on Hot Country Songs at number 25 the week of December 8, 2012. It also debuted at number 94 on the U.S. Billboard Hot 100 for the week of December 8, 2012. It also debuted at number 97 on the Canadian Hot 100 for the week of April 20, 2013. It peaked at number 2 on Billboard Country Airplay dated June 1, 2013, before falling off the following week. It would be his last top ten hit to date on both Billboard's Country Airplay and Country Songs charts.

Starting in March 2013, Strait's label and fanbase started a movement called "60 for 60" in order to help the song reach number 1, so that Strait (who was 60 at the time) will have 60 number-one singles on all major charts. For the week of May 12–18, "Give It All We Got Tonight" became George's 60th number 1 single when it topped the Mediabase chart.

The song was certified two-times Platinum by the RIAA on July 15, 2022, and it has sold 1,008,000 copies in the US as of January 2014.

== Charts ==
=== Weekly charts ===
Chart (2012–2013)	Peak position
Canada Hot 100 (Billboard)	72
Canada Country (Billboard)	30
US Billboard Hot 100	43
US Country Airplay (Billboard)	2
US Hot Country Songs (Billboard)	7

=== Year-end charts ===
Chart (2013)	Position
US Country Airplay (Billboard)	35
US Hot Country Songs (Billboard)	27

== Certifications ==
Region	Certification	Certified units/sales
United States (RIAA)	2× Platinum	1,008,000
