= Tim James (country music songwriter) =

American country songwriter

- Born: Timothy Allen James
- Origin: United States
- Genres: Country
- Occupation: Songwriter
- Publishers: Warner Chappell Music; Downtown Music Publishing

Timothy Allen James is an American songwriter whose credits are mostly in the field of country music. One of his compositions is Toby Keith's "My List", which was a No. 1 single on the country music charts in 2002. James signed to a publishing contract with Warner Chappell Music in 2008. Other songs that he co-wrote include "Good People" by Jeff Bates, "It's Good to Be Us" by Bucky Covington, "All I Ask For Anymore" by Trace Adkins, "Holler Back" by The Lost Trailers, "Love Like Crazy" by Lee Brice, "Give It All We Got Tonight" by George Strait, and "He's Mine", which was recorded by both Billy Ray Cyrus and Rodney Atkins. "All I Ask For Anymore" was nominated for a Grammy Award for Best Country Song in 2010. Tim James's songs are represented by Downtown Music Publishing.
