= The Lost Trailers =

American country music band

Background information
- Also known as: Stokes Nielson & the Lost Trailers
- Origin: Atlanta, Georgia, U.S.
- Genres: Country
- Years active: 2000–2018
- Labels: Two State Brothers; Republic/Universal South; BNA; HRT Records & Productions; Stokes Tunes
- Past members: Stokes Nielson; Ryder Lee; Manny Medina; Andrew Nielson; Jeff Potter; Jason Wyatt; Charles Longoria; Jimmy Lykens; Isaiah Lyon; Jeff Dane

The Lost Trailers were an American country music band. Established in 2000, the band originally comprised Ryder Lee (lead vocals, keyboards), Manny Medina (guitar), Andrew Nielson (bass guitar), Stokes Nielson (vocals, lead guitar), and Jeff Potter (drums). Originally known as Stokes Nielson and the Lost Trailers, the band made its debut at a Fourth of July picnic held by country singer Willie Nelson. That year, the Lost Trailers self-released its debut album Story of the New Age Cowboy, followed in 2002 by Trailer Trash, followed by 2004's Welcome to the Woods on Universal/Republic. After switching to BNA Records in 2006, the band issued a self-titled effort, which produced the singles "Call Me Crazy" and "Why Me", both of which entered the Billboard Hot Country Songs charts. A fifth album, Holler Back, was released in August 2008, producing a top ten country hit in its title track and a top 20 in "How 'Bout You Don't".

In 2011, singer/songwriter Jason Wyatt joined Stokes Nielson, launching a re-establishment of the Lost Trailers. This re-established group released the single "Underdog" with the record label HRT Records & Productions, and then released "American Beauty". Lead singer Jason Wyatt announced he was departing the duo in April 2014 to focus on a solo career.

== History ==
Stokes Nielson and Ryder Lee began writing and producing music together in Albany, Georgia. Their first album together was the self-issued The Story of the New Age Cowboy in 2000. Initially, Ryder and Stokes worked with a bass guitarist and a drummer, forming a group known as Stokes Nielson & the Lost Trailers (later shortened to The Lost Trailers). The name was derived from the fact that the band's equipment trailers had been stolen on three separate occasions.

At the time, Stokes Nielson was also working as a disc jockey for a radio station in Nashville, Tennessee. In 2000, after an on-air interview with Willie Nelson, Stokes offered him a demo version of the Lost Trailers' material. Nelson then offered the band an opportunity to play at a Fourth of July picnic, which he held annually in Texas. Stokes took to the role of lead singer, while Ryder played keyboards and provided backing vocals.

Eventually, the band's membership was later finalized with Lee on keyboards, Stokes' younger brother, Andrew, on bass guitar, Jeff Potter on drums, and Manny Medina on bass guitar. The band then gained a following throughout the Southeast and Texas, performing more than 200 shows yearly.

=== First albums ===
In 2002, the Lost Trailers recorded their second album, entitled Trailer Trash. A third album, Welcome to the Woods, followed two years later on Universal/Republic Records, although its singles failed to chart.

Record producer Blake Chancey, who has worked with the Dixie Chicks and Waylon Jennings, saw the band perform at a concert in Fort Worth, Texas, and offered to work with them. Renee Bell, a talent executive for BNA Records, had also seen the Lost Trailers perform at another concert. She then recommended the band to the label's president, and the Lost Trailers were signed to a recording contract with BNA in 2006. At this point, Lee took over the role of lead vocalist. Their first chart single, "Chicken Fried", was released in early 2006, peaking at number 53 on the Hot Country Songs charts. This single was withdrawn because Zac Brown, who wrote the song, had a clause in the licensing contract that they were not allowed to release the song as a single, which they did, and he wanted to record the song himself. Brown ultimately recorded the song as a member of the Zac Brown Band, whose rendition was a number one hit in late 2008. Despite the cease and desist, the band continued to occasionally perform "Chicken Fried" live, as recently as 2012.

"Chicken Fried" was then withdrawn and replaced with "Call Me Crazy", which peaked at number 43. Following it was "Why Me", which reached number 45. These latter two songs were both included on the Lost Trailers' self-titled album for BNA, which was issued in August of that year.

=== 2008 ===
In 2008, the Lost Trailers went on a nationwide tour with fellow country music artists Keith Anderson and Chris Young. The band's fourth single for BNA, "Holler Back", was released in early 2008. "Holler Back", which reached #9 on the country charts in late 2008, is also the title track to the band's second album for BNA. The band was also nominated for Top New Vocal Duo or Group and Top Vocal Group at the 2009 Academy of Country Music awards.

Following "Holler Back" was "How 'bout You Don't", which was released in October and peaked in the top 20. "All This Love" was originally to have been the third single, but after "Country Folks Livin' Loud" charted as an album cut, it was sent to radio as the third single instead. They were nominated again for the 2010 Academy of Country Music Top New Vocal Group.

In May 2010, the band announced that it would disband following its last concerts in September.

=== 2011 ===
In 2011, the Lost Trailers released a collaboration single with Corbette Jackson, entitled "Heart of a Champion". The song, penned by Nielson and Jackson, is inspired by Coweta County firefighter Chris Landreau's fight against stage 4 cancer. Stokes Nielson also performed a special concert in Albany, Georgia with Jackson and Jason Wyatt.

After several band members left to pursue other interests, Nielson started over with the Lost Trailers, joining with collaborator and lead vocalist Jason Wyatt. The Lost Trailers opted to work with Harrison Tobin of HRT Records & Productions for the release of their next single. The first radio single, "Underdog", was released in late 2011 by HRT Records & Productions. It made the top 40 on the country charts. "American Beauty" followed in mid-2012. Wyatt announced his departure in April 2014. He now produces for several artists in Nashville as Jason Wyatt Productions.

== Discography ==
=== Studio albums ===
Title	Album details	Peak chart positions		
Title	Album details	US Country	US	US Heat
Story of the New Age Cowboy	Release date: September 8, 2000; Label: Two State Brothers	—	—	—
Trailer Trash	Release date: November 11, 2002; Label: Self-released	—	—	—
Welcome to the Woods	Release date: April 20, 2004; Label: Universal South Records	—	—	—
The Lost Trailers	Release date: August 29, 2006; Label: BNA Records	46	—	16
Holler Back	Release date: August 26, 2008; Label: BNA Records	5	32	—
"—" denotes releases that did not chart

=== Singles ===
Year	Single	Peak chart positions			Album
Year	Single	US Country	US Country Airplay	US	Album
2004	"Down in the Valley"	—	—	—	Welcome to the Woods
2004	"Longfall"	—	—	—	Welcome to the Woods
2006	"Chicken Fried"	52	—	—	—N/a
2006	"Call Me Crazy"	43	—	—	The Lost Trailers
2006	"Why Me"	45	—	—	The Lost Trailers
2008	"Holler Back"	9	—	66	Holler Back
2008	"How 'bout You Don't"	17	—	104	Holler Back
2009	"Country Folks (Livin' Loud)"	36	—	—	Holler Back
2011	"Underdog"	37	—	—	—N/a
2012	"American Beauty"	47	40	—	—N/a
2013	"Don't Give Up on Me"	—	—	—	—N/a
2018	"Smoke Signals"	—	—	—	Between Stages

=== Other charted songs ===
Year	Single	Peak positions	Album
Year	Single	US Country	Album
2009	"All This Love"	55	Holler Back

=== Music videos ===
Year	Video	Director
2006	"Call Me Crazy"	Traci Goudie
2006	"Why Me"	Eric Welch
2008	"Holler Back"	Tyson Wisbrock
2009	"How 'bout You Don't"	Tyson Wisbrock
2009	"Country Folks (Livin' Loud)"	Harrison Tobin/The Lost Trailers
2012	"American Beauty"	Stokes Nielson
