= List of songs with lyrics by John Bettis =

A list of songs with lyrics by John Bettis.

== A ==
- "A Baby's Born" by James Ingram
- "A Man Like Me" by Michael Rupert
- "After All" by Linda Eder, The Countdown Singers, Starlite Orchestra
- "Against the Night" by .38 Special
- "Ain't it Just Like Me" - Gary Stewart
- "All for Love" by Fergie Frederikson, Ann Wilson (Heart)
- "All I Can Do" by Carpenters
- "All it Takes is All You've Got" by Howard Cross
- "All Night Desire" by Jackie DeShannon
- "All the Crap I Do" by Mark Wills
- "An Old-Fashioned Christmas" by Carpenters
- "Angel Town" by Peter Cincotti
- "Angelina" by Marty Robbins
- "Another Falling Star" by Peter Cincotti
- "Another Song" by Carpenters
- "Any Old Time" by Christopher Cross
- "As Long As There's Laughter" by Gene Cotton
- "As Long As We Got Each Other" by Dusty Springfield, BJ Thomas
- "At the End of the Song" by Carpenters
- "Au bout du monde, (Top of the World) recorded by Claude Valade, French adaptation Christine Charbonneau
- "Au Bout du Monde" (Top of the World) recorded by Bourbon Gautier, French adaptation Christine Charbonneau
- "Aurora" by Oregon, Carpenters

== B ==
- "Be Careful" by Peter Cincotti
- "Because We Are in Love (The Wedding Song)" by Carpenters
- "Bells of Christmas" by Órla Fallon
- "Benediction" by Carpenters
- "Best for Last" by Richard Kerr
- "Better Days" by Jude Cole
- "Blacktop Road" by The Lost Trailers
- "Blue Mountain Home" by Reg Lindsay
- "Body Rock" by Maria Vidal, Delicious
- "Broken Children" by Peter Cincotti
- "Bump and Hollows" by Jerry Goldsmith

== C ==
- "Can You Feel It" - Dobie Gray
- "Can You Stop the Rain" by Peabo Bryson
- "Captives of the Heart" by Dionne Warwick
- "Changing Away from You" by Hep Stars
- "Cinderella Beautiful" by Peter Cincotti
- "Closing this Memory Down" by Lee Ann Womack
- "Colors of the Spirit" by Journey
- "Come Back to My Love" by Eric Carmen
- "Come Tomorrow" by Peter Cincotti
- "Crazy for You" by Madonna
- "Crescent Noon" by Carpenters
- "Crystal Lullaby" by Carpenters

== D ==
- "Dancing on the Edge" by The Hooters
- "Darling You Were All that I Had" by Tim Rose, Jody Watley
- "December Boys" by Peter Cincotti
- "Deep into Paradise" by Jackie DeShannon
- "Dejame Quererte Para Siempre by Jaci Velasquez
- "Distant Shore" by Orla Fallon
- "Doin' it the Best I Can" by Bill Medley
- "Don't be Afraid" by Carpenters
- "Don't Fall in Love with Me" by Barry Manilow
- "Don't Say Goodbye" by Christopher Cross
- "Dos Extranos" by Emmanuel
- "Druscilla Penny" by Carpenters

== E ==
- "Eighteen" by Aaron Pritchett
- "En la Cima del Mundo" by Herencia Mexicana
- "Eve" by Carpenters
- "Eventide" by Carpenters
- "Every Turn of the World" by Christopher Cross
- "Eyes of the World" by Michael Crawford

== F ==
- "Faerie Dance" by Jerry Goldsmith
- "Fingerprints by Kellie Coffey
- "Fire in the City" by Jackie DeShannon
- "Fools Get Lucky" by Barry Manilow
- "For You" by Dionne Warwick
- "Friday Night is a Great Night for Football" by Bill Medley
- "Friends Like Us" by Randy Travis

== G ==
- "Goin' Down to Hollywood" by Tim Rose
- "Goodbye Philadelphia by Peter Cincotti
- "(I'm Caught Between) Goodbye and I Love You" by Carpenters
- "Goodbye to Love" by Carpenters

== H ==
- "Happy" by Carpenters
- "Has There Ever Been a Good Goodbye" by .38 Special
- "He'll Never Know" by Pamela Myers
- "Heart of the Night" by Juice Newton
- "Hearts on Fire" by .38 Special
- "Heartland" by George Strait
- "Highway Home" by Demis Roussos
- "Honky-Tonkin'" by Gary Stewart
- "Human Nature" by Michael Jackson

== I ==
- "I Can't Believe My Eyes" by Russell Hitchcock
- "I Can't Say No" by Joe Cocker
- "I Get That All the Time" by Due West
- "I Have You" by Carpenters
- "I Hear the South Callin' Me" by Toy Caldwell, Hank Thompson
- "I Hear You Call" by Christopher Cross
- "I Know I Need to Be in Love" by Tom Netherton
- "I Need to Be in Love" by Carpenters
- "I Never Danced with You" by Laurie Beechman
- "I Wanted it All" by Rita Coolidge
- "I'm Coming to the Best Part of My Life" by Mama Cass
- "I'm No Angel" by Faith Prince
- "If I Cry" by Lorrie Morgan
- "If I Was Rain" by Steven Whitson
- "If You Believe" by Kevin Sharp
- "If You Could See Me Now" by Celine Dion, Michael Crawford
- "If You Go Away" by New Kids on the Block
- "In Italian" by José Carreras
- "Invocation" by Carpenters
- "It Ain't So Easy" by Chalee Tennison
- "It Goes Like This" by John Michael Montgomery

== J ==
- "Just One Dream" by Lisa Donahey, Heather Headley
- "Just a Little Love" by .38 Special

== K ==
- "Killer Bee" by Anouk

== L ==
- "La Mujer Que Hay en Mi" by Heart
- "Lay Your Body Down (Goodnight Philadelphia)" by Peter Cincotti
- "Lesson in Goodbye" by Michael Peterson
- "Let Me Love You One More Time" by Michael Peterson
- "Let's Take All Night" by Barry Manilow
- "Liberte" by Judy Collins
- "Lie Goes On" by Billy Vera and the Beaters
- "Life Will Go On" by Barry Manilow
- "Like No One in the World" by Johnny Mathis
- "Like No Other Night" by .38 Special
- "Living River/ Bumps & Hollows/The Freeze" by Jerry Goldsmith
- "Lock Up Your Daughters" by Don Barnes
- "Look At Me Now" Barry Manilow
- "Look to your Dreams" by Carpenters
- "Looking for You" by Khymera
- "Looking over my shoulder" by Emerson Drive
- "Love Comes Without Warning" by America
- "Love Has Been a Friend to Me" by Julio Iglesias
- "Love Is Love (In Any Language)" by Christopher Cross
- "Love Me for What I Am" by Carpenters
- "Love's a River Flowing" by Skylark
- "Loving Strangers (David's Theme)" by Patrick Leonard, Christopher Cross
- "Lunch" by Michael Rupert
- "Lunch Concerto" by Richard Carpenter

== M ==
- "Man on a Mission" by Peter Cincotti
- "Maybe it's You" by Carpenters
- "Medley: Sing/Goodbye to Love/Eve/Rainy Days and Mondays/Look to..." by Richard Carpenter
- "Message of Love" by Journey
- "Mr. Guder by Carpenters
- "My First Christmas With You by Jim Wilson
- "My True Love's Eyes" by Jerry Goldsmith

== N ==
- "Never Stop Believing" by Christopher Cross
- "Nights Are Forever" by Jennifer Warnes
- "Nobody Told Me Barry Manilow

== O ==
- "Once I Get Over You by Ronnie Milsap
- "Once in a While by Billy Dean
- "One Love by Carpenters
- "One Moment by Steve Quinzi
- "One Moment in Time" by Whitney Houston
- "One of a Kind Pair of Fools" by Barbara Mandrell
- "Only One Love in My Life" by Ronnie Milsap
- "Only Yesterday" by Carpenters
- "Only You Will Do" by 2nd Nature
- "Over My Head Again" by Jackie DeShannon

== P ==
- "Pa Varidens Tak" by Vikingarna
- "Perfectly Alone" by Carol Burnett
- "Promise Me You'll Remember" by Harry Connick Jr.

== R ==
- "Reachin for a little bit More by Marshall Tucker Band
- "Remember When" by Ray Vega
- "Requiem for a Lightweight by Mark Morales
- "Rhapsody for Now: Live and Let Die" by Doc Severinsen
- "Rhythm in My Heart" by Stacy Earl
- "Right Here/Human Nature" by SWV
- "Running Alone" by Steve Perry

== S ==
- "Sailing the Tide" by Carpenters
- "Same Old Feeling" by .38 Special
- "Sandy" by Carpenters
- "Saturday" by Carpenters
- "She Ain't You" by Chris Brown
- "Say it Simple" by Sixwire
- "Since You Walked into My Life" by New Kids on the Block
- "Sing for the Children" by Ben Tankard
- "Sing the Wee" by Jerry Goldsmith
- "Skyline" by Brian Mitchell
- "Slow Hand" by Conway Twitty, Pointer Sisters
- "So Hard Living Without You" by Airwaves
- "So Sexy" by Twista
- "Someday" by The Carpenters, Shirley Bassey
- "Someone Else's Life" by Jo Dee Messina
- "Some Things Live Forever" by Frankie Avalon and Annette Funicello
- "Someone Else's Baby" by Tori Darke
- "Stomp" by Michael Peterson
- "Sunshine and Shadows" by The Sunshine Company
- "Sweet Beginnings" by Marlena Shaw
- "Sweet Forgiveness" by Barbra Streisand (Unreleased)
- "Swept Away" by Christopher Cross

== T ==
- "Take this Heart" by Larry Stewart
- "Tangled up in You" by Julie Budd
- "Tell me How" by Chad Brock
- "That Girl" by Christopher Cross
- "That's Why I Call You My Friend" by Diana Ross
- "The Love You Promised Me" by Monte Warden
- "The Moon's a Window to Heaven" by Hiroshima
- "The Week the River Raged" by Sara Evans
- "The Woman in Me" by Donna Summer, Heart
- "The World from Way Up Here" by Alison Krauss
- "There's No Place Like Home" by Chloris Leachman
- "These Wings" by Jessica Andrews
- "They Say That Falling in Love is Wonderful/ I Need to Be in Love" by James Ingram
- "This is the Night" by James Ingram
- "This Love, This Time" by Signal
- "Those Good Old Dreams" by Carpenters
- "Time Alone" by Lynn Anderson
- "Time Stands Still" by Davis Gaines
- "Tiny Dreamer" by Nanci Griffith
- "Too Far Gone" by Neal McCoy
- "Too Hot to Sleep" by Louise Mandrell
- "Top of the World" by Carpenters, Lynn Anderson
- "Turn Away" by Carpenters
- "True Believers" by Jeffrey Osborne
- "Two into One" by Bill Medley

== U ==
- "UBU" by Peter Cincotti
- "Under the Christmas Tree" by Albert Hammond

== V ==
- "Voice of the Heart" by Diana Ross

== W ==
- "We Got Business" by The Spinners
- "We Will Always Survive" by Gary Cirimelli
- "(Truth is) We're Livin' a Lie" by D.C. Banyo
- "What A Time" by Barry Manilow
- "What's the Use?" by Carpenters
- "When You Care" by Positive Voices, The Last Session
- "When You Tell Me That You Love Me" by Dolly Parton, Julio Iglesias, Diana Ross
- "Where Are They Now" by Barry Manilow
- "Where Do We Go?" by Everette Harp
- "Where There is Hope" by Guiding Light (CBS)
- "Where Were You?" by Jo Dee Messina
- "Why Fall at All" by Melissa Manchester
- "Who's Gonna Love you tonight" by David Foster
- "Wild Again" by Starship

== Y ==
- "Yesterday Once More" by Carpenters
- "You Are My Heart" by Lara Fabian
- "You Can't Keep Me" by Tim Rose
- "You Never Know" by Ringo Starr
- "You Won't be Lonely Now" by Billy Ray Cyrus
- "You're Enough "by Carpenters
- "You're Not From Here" by Lara Fabian
- "Your Wonderful Parade" by Carpenters

== Films ==
Songs by John Bettis written for films:

- 8 Seconds - "Once in a While" by Billy Dean
- All I Want for Christmas - "Under the Christmas Tree" by Albert Hammond
- Back to the Beach - "Some Things Live Forever" by Frankie Avalon and Annette Funicello
- Body Rock - "Body Rock" by Maria Vidal
- Cobra - "Two Into One" by Bill Medley and Carmen Twillie
- Cocktail - "Wild Again" by Starship
- Curly Sue - "You Never Know" by Ringo Starr
- The Godfather Part III - "Promise Me You'll Remember" by Harry Connick, Jr.
- The Last Boy Scout - "Friday Night's a Great Night for Football" by Bill Medley
- Listen to Me - "Who's Gonna Love You Tonight" by David Foster
- The Lonely Guy - "Love Comes Without Warning" by America
- Mannequin Two: On the Move by "Can't Believe My Eyes" by Gene Miller
- The Men's Club - "A Fool for Love" by Jim Gilstrap
- National Lampoon's European Vacation - "New Looks" by Dr. John
- Nothing in Common - "Loving Strangers" by Christopher Cross
- Oh, God! You Devil - "If It Was Only Up to Me", "Dangerous Eyes"
- Pure Country - "Heartland" by George Strait
- Ratboy - "Tangled Up in You", "Pretty Face"
- Say Anything... - "All for Love" by Nancy Wilson (Heart)
- Star Trek V: The Final Frontier - "The Moon's a Window to Heaven" by Hiroshima
- Twilight Zone: The Movie - "Nights Are Forever" by Jennifer Warnes
- Vision Quest - "Crazy for You" by Madonna

== Television ==
Songs written for television by John Bettis:

- "Annabelle's Wish" - "The World From Way Up Here", "Friends Like Us", "Tiny Dreamer Music Box Theme", "If You Believe", "There's No Place Like Home", "The World From Way Up Here Reprise" by Randy Travis, Alison Krauss, Beth Neilsen Chapman, Chloris Leachman
- "Empty Nest" - "Life Goes On" by Billy Vera
- "Free Spirit"
- "Growing Pains" - "As Long as We Got Each Other" by B.J. Thomas, Jennifer Warnes, Dusty Springfield, Kim Carnes, "Swept Away" by Christopher Cross
- "Guiding Light" - "Where There is Hope"
- "Just the Ten of Us" - "Doin' it the Best I Can" by Bill Medley, "Lock Up Your Daughters" by Don Barnes
- "Major Dad"
- "Murphy Brown - "Like the Whole World's Watching" by Take 6
- "Nurses" - "Here I Am"
- Summer Olympics '88- "One Moment in Time" by Whitney Houston
- "Uncle Buck" - "Uncle Buck" by Ronnie Milsap

== Uses in Television and Film ==
=== Film ===
- 13 Going on 30 - "Crazy for You" by Madonna
- American Heart - "Slow Hand" by Pointer Sisters
- Double Dare - "Top of the World" by Carpenters
- Free Willy - "Right Here (Human Nature Remix)" by SWV
- High School High - "Top of the World" by Carpenters
- Johnny Be Good - "Perfect Stranger"
- The Last Supper - "Top of the World" by Carpenters
- The Parent Trap - "Top of the World" by Carpenters
- Road to Alice - "Top of the World" by Carpenters
- S.F.W. - "As Long As We Got Each Other" performed by Stephen Dorff
- Showdown in Little Tokyo - "Top of the World" by Carpenters
- The Spirit of '76 - "Top of the World" by Carpenters
- Shrek Forever After - "Top of the World" by Carpenters
- Taps - "Slow Hand" by Pointer Sisters
- The Fast and the Furious: Tokyo Drift - "Top of the World" by Carpenters
- This is It - "Human Nature" by Michael Jackson

=== Television ===
- "The 63rd Academy Awards" - "Promise Me You'll Remember"
- "Bat Yam - New York" - "Only Yesterday", "Top of the World"
- "The Benny Hill Show" - "Yesterday Once More"
- "Cellule Identite" - "Goodbye Philadelphia"
- "Independent Lens" - "Top of the World"
- "The Karen Carpenter Story" - "Eve", "Top of the World"
- "Live from Studio Five" - "One Moment in Time"
- "Living with Michael Jackson: A Tonight Special" - "Human Nature"
- "The Practice" - "One Moment in Time"
- "Sez Lies" - "Yesterday Once More"
- "The Simpsons" - "Top of the World"
- "Tuya yo! Matsumoto sarin iken: Hannin to Yobarete... Kazoku wo mamori nuita 15 nen "- "Top of the World", "Yesterday Once More"
- "Will and Grace" - "Crazy for You"
- "The X Factor" - "Human Nature"
