= Clay Walker (album) =

Studio album by Clay Walker
- Released: August 3, 1993
- Recorded: October 1992–March 1993
- Studio: The Castle, Franklin, TN, 16th Avenue Sound, Loud Recording, Masterfonics, Mesa Recording, Sound Stage Studios, Nashville, TN
- Genre: Country
- Length: 36:15
- Label: Giant
- Producer: James Stroud

Clay Walker chronology
Clay Walker (1993)	If I Could Make a Living (1994)

Singles from Clay Walker
- 1. "What's It to You" Released: July 15, 1993; 2. "Live Until I Die" Released: October 21, 1993; 3. "Where Do I Fit in the Picture" Released: February 1994; 4. "Dreaming with My Eyes Open" Released: May 27, 1994

Clay Walker is the debut studio album by the American country music singer Clay Walker. It was released in 1993 on Giant Records and produced by James Stroud. The album produced four singles on the Billboard country music charts, of which three — "What's It to You", "Live Until I Die" and "Dreaming with My Eyes Open" — reached Number One. Respectively, these were the first, second, and fourth singles from the album. The third single, "Where Do I Fit in the Picture", peaked at No. 11. Additionally, "White Palace" peaked at No. 67 based on unsolicited airplay.

== Background ==
After hearing about Walker, James Stroud flew down to Beaumont, Texas, to meet him and see his show. After being "completely impressed", Stroud brought Walker to Nashville to record demos and then signed him to Giant and they began work on the debut album. Stroud revealed, "Clay is very consistent, and that's pretty rare in such a young act. He's one of those artists who, when he sings and you hear him going down on tape, you just know. I knew it with Clint [Black], and I could hear it with Clay." Walker explained the meeting in SUCCESS by saying, "I finished the last song, chased Stroud to his limousine and asked him if everything was OK. He said yes and that he would see me in a couple of weeks to start recording an album."

In an interview with the Los Angeles Times Walker said, "It was frustrating that I wasn't getting a contract, but I never doubted I'd eventually get one from somebody. That's because my father taught me something else too--to have incredible confidence in myself." Walker told Country Song Roundup, "The songs that I write are normally either a true life experience, or they're things that I've witnessed from other people, friends or family. When you write, you become vulnerable. If you're gonna be true to yourself and write what you really feel, that's what you have to do, you have to put down on paper exactly what you're feeling.... I make myself very vulnerable because I open up my thoughts and they could be criticized, which can be painful, or they can be accepted.

Walker was one of several musicians including Tracy Byrd and Mark Chesnutt who came from Beaumont, Texas when his debut album was released. He told The Spokesman-Review, "Beaumont is a goldmine for talent, I'll guarantee you every label in Nashville could go down there for a couple of months and find at least four or five entertainers." Walker also stated, "I'm a lot more influenced by Haggard than anyone else. I like those powerful ballads and two-steppin music. I love swing too, but it's probably that competition thing again." Walker told the Pittsburgh Post-Gazette in addition to Merle Haggard, "My influences were Hank Williams Sr., George Jones, and Charley Pride – the kind of country my dad liked, the kind I grew up on. I'm convinced traditional country music will come back more and more. After all it's the real thing. It's honest, and it's not just a sound, it's a way of life."

== Content ==
"What's It to You" and "I Don't Know How Love Starts" were both previously recorded by Curtis Wright, its co-writer, on his 1992 self-titled debut. The latter song was also co-written by Pirates of the Mississippi member Rich Alves. "Dreaming with My Eyes Open" was also featured in the soundtrack to the 1993 film The Thing Called Love.

== Critical reception ==
Professional ratings
Review scores
Source	Rating
AllMusic	4.5/5 stars
The Cincinnati Post	3.5/5 stars
Observer-Reporter	2.5/5 stars
The Post and Courier	3/5 stars

Geoffrey Hines of The Washington Post wrote, "The impressive debut album by Clint Black mastermind James Stroud, reveals a young man still casting about for his own style but nonetheless bringing a handsome, personal tenor and a sure rhythmic instinct to every song he tries. Offering a more promising for this youngster are the five songs he co-wrote himself; they boast the sort of lyric detail and musical build that bring out the best in his voice." Mary Jo DiLonardo of The Cincinnati Post gave the album three and a half stars out of five and wrote, "Already risking comparisons to Garth Brooks and Clint Black, Walker has a strong voice, rugged cowboy looks (a "must" for videos) and a good crop of songs." Joe Breen of The Irish Times said, "Best newcomer award goes to Clay Walker whose eponymous album sounds like it's worth checking out. Better value will be hard to find this year."

Dave Molter of the Observer-Reporter gave the album two and a half stars and wrote, "Walker's voice is clear, if not distinctive and he has the kind of chiseled good looks that might me him rise above the heard." Mia Carlson of the Lewiston Morning Tribune gave the album a favorable review and wrote, "It sounds like Giant records has put a lot of faith in this young Texan. Definitely worth a few more listens." Carlson also praised Walker's song writing as well as James Stroud's production. Jon Rawl of The Post and Courier gave the album three stars and wrote, "This album proves he may be a Walker, but he hits the ground running." Rawl also wrote, "Clay Walker sounds like a seasoned professional on this debut album."

== Track listing ==
No.	Title	Writer(s)	Length
1.	"Dreaming with My Eyes Open"	Tony Arata	3:30
2.	"What's It to You"	Robert Ellis Orrall, Curtis Wright	2:46
3.	"The Silence Speaks for Itself"	Chris Waters, Clay Walker, Tom Shapiro	4:20
4.	"How to Make a Man Lonesome"	Kim Williams, Randy Boudreaux	2:44
5.	"Next Step in Love"	Walker	3:19
6.	"White Palace"	Zack Turner, Byron Hill	2:45
7.	"Money Can't Buy (The Love We Had)"	Walker	3:02
8.	"Things I Should Have Said"	John Paul Daniel, Shawna Harrington-Burkhart	3:30
9.	"Where Do I Fit in the Picture"	Walker	3:57
10.	"Live Until I Die"	Walker	2:50
11.	"I Don't Know How Love Starts"	Rich Alves, T. J. Knight, Wright	3:32

== Personnel ==
- Eddie Bayers – drums
- Larry Byrom – acoustic guitar
- Jimmy Carter – bass guitar
- Stuart Duncan – fiddle
- Paul Franklin – steel guitar
- Sonny Garrish – steel guitar
- Dann Huff – electric guitar
- Jana King – background vocals
- Steve Nathan – piano
- Bobby Ogdin – piano
- Larry Paxton – bass guitar
- Matt Rollings – piano
- Brent Rowan – electric guitar
- Leland Sklar – bass guitar
- Joe Spivey – fiddle
- Clay Walker – lead vocals
- Lonnie Wilson – drums
- Curtis Wright – background vocals
- Curtis Young – background vocals

== Charts and certifications ==
The album peaked at No. 8 on Top Country Albums on 1/29/94 and at No. 52 on The Billboard 200 on 1/22/94.

=== Weekly charts ===
Chart (1993)	Peak position
U.S. Billboard Top Country Albums	8
U.S. Billboard 200	52
U.S. Billboard Top Heatseekers	2
Canadian RPM Country Albums	1
Canadian RPM Top Albums	47

=== End of year charts ===
Chart (1993)	Year-end 1993
US Billboard Top Country Albums	72
Chart (1994)	Year-end 1994
US Billboard Top Country Albums	18

=== Certifications ===
Country	Certification
United States	Platinum
Canada	Platinum

=== Singles ===
Year	Single	Peak chart positions		
Year	Single	US Country	US	CAN Country
1993	"What's It to You"	1	73	1
1993	"Live Until I Die"	1	107	1
1994	"Where Do I Fit in the Picture"	11		6
1994	"Dreaming with My Eyes Open"	1		1

=== Other Charting Songs ===
Year	Single	Peak positions	
Year	Single	US Country	CAN Country
1994	"White Palace"	67	80
