= Jenny Simpson (disambiguation) =

Jenny Simpson is an American middle distance runner and steeplechaser.

Jenny or Jennifer Simpson may also refer to:

- Jenny Simpson (singer), American country music singer
  - Jenny Simpson (album)
- Jennifer Simpson (Clock Tower), video game character in Clock Tower (1995 video game)
- Jennie Simpson (bowls), New Zealand lawn bowler
- Jennie Simpson (camogie), camogie player
