= Being Human (album) =

Studio album by Michael Peterson
- Released: June 8, 1999
- Genre: Country
- Length: 40:45
- Label: Reprise #47373
- Producer: Josh Leo; Robert Ellis Orrall

Michael Peterson chronology
Michael Peterson (1997)	Being Human (1999)	Super Hits (2000)

Being Human is the second studio album by American country music singer Michael Peterson. It was released June 8, 1999, via Reprise Records. The album includes the singles "Somethin' 'bout a Sunday" and "Sure Feels Real Good", which reached Nos. 45 and 39, respectively, on the Billboard country singles chart. The album peaked at No. 32 on the Top Country Albums chart.

Michael Gallucci of AllMusic called the album "amiable, if ordinary, country."

== Track listing ==
No.	Title	Writer(s)	Length
1.	"Laughin' All the Way to the Bank"	Michael Peterson, Josh Leo, Rick Bowles	3:01
2.	"You Find Love When You Make It"	Peterson, Robert Ellis Orrall	2:52
3.	"I Owe It All to You"	Peterson, Lewis Anderson	3:57
4.	"Somethin' 'Bout a Sunday"	Craig Wiseman, Tim Nichols	3:58
5.	"Let Me Love You One More Time"	Peterson, John Bettis	4:01
6.	"Sure Feels Real Good"	Peterson, Gene Pistilli	2:51
7.	"Being Human"	Chuck Jones, Tom Shapiro	4:14
8.	"Stomp"	Peterson, Bettis, Leo	3:34
9.	"Two of the Lucky Ones" (duet with Bekka Bramlett)	Peterson, Jim Weatherly	4:45
10.	"Slow Dance"	Peterson, Orrall	4:08
11.	"Before Another Day Goes By"	Peterson, Orrall, Leo	3:24

== Charts ==
Chart (1999)	Peak position
U.S. Billboard Top Country Albums	32
U.S. Billboard Top Heatseekers	20
