= Jennie Simpson =

Jennie Simpson may refer to:

- Jennie Simpson (camogie)
- Jennie Simpson (bowls)

== See also ==
- Jenny Simpson (disambiguation)
