= What's It to You =

"What's It To You"

Single by Clay Walker

from the album Clay Walker
- B-side: "Where Do I Fit in the Picture"
- Released: July 15, 1993
- Genre: Neotraditional country; country rock
- Length: 2:46
- Label: Giant
- Songwriters: Robert Ellis Orrall; Curtis Wright
- Producer: James Stroud

Clay Walker singles chronology
"What's It To You" (1993)	"Live Until I Die" (1993)

Music video
- "What's It To You" on YouTube

"What's It To You" is a debut song written by Robert Ellis Orrall and Curtis Wright, and recorded by American country music singer Clay Walker that reached the top of the Billboard Hot Country Singles & Tracks chart. It was released In July 1993 by Giant Records as his debut single, and was served as the lead-off single from his self-titled debut album (1993).

== Background ==
Curtis Wright wrote the song with Robert Ellis Orrall. Wright also recorded it on his own self-titled debut album for Liberty Records in 1992. Wright's version was produced by James Stroud, who also produced Walker's version, and Lynn Peterzell.

In 1993, Walker opened for George Strait and Alan Jackson and he stated in an interview with Billboard "I'm real grateful for the opportunity to open for those guys", with only one hit record, it's hard to keep the audience's attention for 45 minutes, but it's working. I'm surprised, but lately when I go out there, they're going bonkers."

After the single hit the number one position, Walker stated "It used to be that having your song go No. 1 meant a certain degree of success. Now, there are so many acts who do it, you just gotta go right back out and do it again." In another interview, Walker said, "Having a No. 1 hit doesn't mean you're making any more money that you did a few years ago."

== Critical reception ==
Geoffrey Hines of The Washington Post wrote that "What's It to You" is "A silly little song that could be dismissed if it weren't for the way Walker glides into the catchy chorus melody." Larry Daniels of KNIX in Phoenix said What's It To You "Is one of our three best records right now." Dave Moulter of the Observer-Reporter wrote, "What's It to You is representative of the Beaumont, Texas native style: good hard country with rock tinges that immediately make you want to dance." In 1999, while reviewing "Live Laugh Love", Lance Ringel of The Ledger wrote, "...What's It To You – a song which could just as easily have scaled the pop charts, and which remains of the best country-rock tunes of the decade."

Kevin John Coyne of Country Universe listed "What's It to You " as the 161st best country single of the 1990s and wrote, "He infuses his performance with such raw, electric energy that the song becomes an invigorating anthem for those who couldn't be more convinced of their love for someone. And that final clap-along chorus? Pure joy."

== Music video ==
Clay Walker's first music video was directed by Marc Ball. It features Walker and his band performing the song on stage and uses the aspect of a behind the scenes look at filming and production of the video.

== Charts ==
=== Weekly charts ===
Chart (1993)	Peak position
Canada Country Singles (RPM)	1
US Billboard Hot 100	73
US Hot Country Songs (Billboard)	1
US Cash Box Top 100	75

=== Year-end charts ===
Chart (1993)	Position
Canada Country Tracks (RPM)	9
US Country Songs (Billboard)	2
