= By the Book (song) =

Single by Michael Peterson

from the album Michael Peterson
- Released: September 26, 1998
- Genre: Country
- Length: 3:02
- Label: Reprise
- Songwriters: Michael Peterson, Robert Ellis Orrall
- Producers: Robert Ellis Orrall, Josh Leo

Michael Peterson singles chronology
"When the Bartender Cries" (1998)	"By the Book" (1998)	"Somethin' 'bout a Sunday" (1999)

"By the Book" is a song co-written and recorded by American country music artist Michael Peterson. It was released in September 1998 as the fifth and final single from his 1997 album Michael Peterson. The song reached No. 19 on the Billboard Hot Country Singles & Tracks chart. Peterson wrote the song with Robert Ellis Orrall.

== Chart performance ==
Chart (1998–1999)	Peak position
Canada Country Singles (RPM)	22
US Bubbling Under Hot 100 (Billboard)	1
US Hot Country Songs (Billboard)	19
