= Too Good to Be True (Michael Peterson song) =

Single by Michael Peterson

from the album Michael Peterson
- Released: January 19, 1998
- Genre: Country
- Length: 3:20
- Label: Reprise
- Songwriters: Michael Peterson; Gene Pistilli
- Producers: Josh Leo; Robert Ellis Orrall

Michael Peterson singles chronology
"From Here to Eternity" (1997)	"Too Good to Be True" (1998)	"When the Bartender Cries" (1998)

"Too Good to Be True" is a song co-written and recorded by American country music artist Michael Peterson. It was released in January 1998 as the third single from his debut album Michael Peterson. The song reached #8 on the Billboard Hot Country Singles & Tracks chart in May 1998. The song was written by Peterson and Gene Pistilli.

== Critical reception ==
Larry Flick, of Billboard magazine reviewed the song favorably, saying that the tune "boasts a percolating rhythm and Peterson's personality-packed vocals."

== Music video ==
The music video was directed by Steven Goldmann and premiered in early 1998.

== Chart performance ==
"Too Good to Be True" debuted at number 55 on the U.S. Billboard Hot Country Singles & Tracks for the week of January 31, 1998.

Chart (1998)	Peak position
Canada Country Singles (RPM)	5
US Hot Country Songs (Billboard)	8

=== Year-end charts ===
Chart (1998)	Position
Canada Country Tracks (RPM)	69
US Country Songs (Billboard)	56
