= Drink, Swear, Steal & Lie =

Single by Michael Peterson

from the album Michael Peterson
- B-side: "For a Song"
- Released: May 6, 1997
- Genre: Country
- Length: 3:01
- Label: Reprise
- Songwriters: Michael Peterson; Paula Carpenter
- Producers: Josh Leo; Robert Ellis Orrall

Michael Peterson singles chronology
"Drink, Swear, Steal & Lie" (1997)	"From Here to Eternity" (1997)

"Drink, Swear, Steal & Lie" is a debut song co-written and recorded by American country music artist Michael Peterson for his first album Michael Peterson. It was released in May 1997 as his debut single, and the first single and reached number 3 on the Billboard Hot Country Singles & Tracks chart in August 1997. The song was written by Peterson and Paula Carpenter.

== Content ==
The song is about a man whose father counsels him to never drink, swear, steal or lie. Later in life he finds that he drinks from a woman’s loving cup, he swears to never give her up, steals all of her kisses underneath the moon, and lies close to her, thus breaking all his rules.

== Critical reception ==
Larry Flick, of Billboard magazine reviewed the song favorably, saying that Peterson has a "full-throated delivery that exudes personality and vocal charm". He goes on to say that the "energy in the production complements Peterson's performance, and the whole package signals the birth of a new star".

== Music video ==
The music video was directed by Tim Hamilton and was premiered in mid-1997.

== Chart performance ==
"Drink, Swear, Steal & Lie" debuted at number 60 on the U.S. Billboard Hot Country Singles & Tracks for the week of May 17, 1997.

Chart (1997)	Peak position
Canada Country Singles (RPM)	2
US Billboard Hot 100	86
US Hot Country Songs (Billboard)	3

=== Year-end charts ===
Chart (1997)	Position
Canada Country Tracks (RPM)	33
US Country Songs (Billboard)	16
