= It Had to Be You =

It Had to Be You may refer to:

== Film and television ==
- It Had to Be You (1947 film), an American romantic comedy film
- "It Had to Be You" (Perfect Strangers), a 1992 episode of Perfect Strangers
- It Had to Be You (TV series), a 1993 American sitcom
- It Had To Be You (2000 film), a romantic comedy with Natasha Henstridge and Michael Vartan
- It Had to Be You!, a 2005 Hong Kong romantic comedy film
- It Had to Be You (2016 film), a romantic comedy starring Cristin Milioti, Dan Soder, and Halley Feiffer

== Literature ==
- It Had to Be You, a 2007 novel in the Gossip Girl novel series
- It Had to Be You (novel), a 1994 romance novel by Susan Elizabeth Phillips

== Music ==
- "It Had to Be You" (song), a 1924 song by Isham Jones and Gus Kahn
- It Had To Be You, a 2008 song by Motion City Soundtrack
- It Had to Be You (album), a 1991 Harry Connick, Jr. album
- It Had to Be You: The Great American Songbook, a 2002 Rod Stewart album
