= It Had to Be You (album) =

Compilation album by Harry Connick Jr.
- Released: September 15, 1991
- Genre: Big Band
- Label: Sony/Columbia

Professional ratings
Review scores
Source	Rating
Allmusic	3.5/5 stars

It Had to Be You is a compilation album from Harry Connick Jr., released in Australia in 1991.

The album is a blend of original studio recordings from Connick's previous albums. The album has six tracks from When Harry Met Sally... (1989), four from We Are in Love (1990), one from Lofty's Roach Souffle (1990), and one from the soundtrack for The Godfather Part III (1990).

It Had to Be You peaked at number 4 on the Australian charts.

== Track listing ==
1. "It Had to Be You" (Big Band & Vocals) (Isham Jones, Gus Kahn)
2. "I Could Write a Book" (Lorenz Hart, Richard Rodgers)
3. "But Not for Me" (G. Gershwin, I. Gershwin)
4. "Stompin' at the Savoy" (Benny Goodman, Chick Webb, Edgar Sampson, Andy Razaf)
5. "Where or When" (Lorenz Hart, Richard Rodgers)
6. "It's All Right with Me" (Cole Porter)
7. "Promise Me You'll Remember (Love Theme From The Godfather Part III)" (Coppola, John Bettis) – 5:10
8. "We Are in Love" (Connick)
9. "Forever, for Now" (Harry Connick Jr., Ramsey McLean)
10. "Lofty's Roach Soufflé" (Connick) – 5:23
11. "Don't Get Around Much Anymore" (Duke Ellington, Bob Russell)
12. "Recipe for Love" (Connick)

== Album chart ==
- Australia – peak: 4 / weeks: 28

== Certifications ==
Region	Certification	Certified units/sales
Australia (ARIA)	2× Platinum	140,000^{^}
New Zealand (RMNZ)	Gold	7,500^{^}
^{^} Shipments figures based on certification alone.
