= Michael Peterson (album) =

Studio album by Michael Peterson
- Released: July 15, 1997
- Genre: Country
- Length: 40:06
- Label: Reprise #46618
- Producer: Josh Leo; Robert Ellis Orrall

Michael Peterson chronology
Michael Peterson (1997)	Being Human (1999)

Michael Peterson is the debut studio album by the American country music artist Michael Peterson. Released in 1997 on Reprise Records, it features the singles "Drink, Swear, Steal & Lie", "From Here to Eternity", "Too Good to Be True", "When the Bartender Cries" and "By the Book", all of which charted on the Billboard Hot Country Singles & Tracks (now Hot Country Songs) charts. "From Here to Eternity" was a Number One on that chart in late 1997.

AllMusic critic Thom Owens called the album an "engaging set of contemporary country, highlighted by Peterson's warm, welcoming voice." Alanna Nash of Entertainment Weekly gave it a "B" rating, saying that the production was "lightweight" but that Peterson's performance and the song selection made it "a feel-good dance album."

== Track listing ==
No.	Title	Writer(s)	Length
1.	"Lost in the Shuffle"	Michael Peterson, Josh Leo, Robert Ellis Orrall	3:36
2.	"Love's Great"	Peterson, Arlos Smith	2:42
3.	"When the Bartender Cries"	Peterson, Hunter Davis	3:43
4.	"Drink, Swear, Steal & Lie"	Peterson, Paula Carpenter	3:01
5.	"I Finally Passed the Bar" (duet with Travis Tritt)	Peterson, Michael Puryear, Buddy Brock	3:43
6.	"From Here to Eternity"	Peterson, Orrall	3:36
7.	"That's What They Said About The Buffalo"	Peterson, Puryear	3:31
8.	"Too Good to Be True"	Peterson, Gene Pistilli	3:20
9.	"Since I Thought I Knew It All"	Peterson, Ashe Underwood	3:35
10.	"By the Book"	Peterson, Orrall	3:02
11.	"For a Song"	Dewayne Blackwell	4:49

== Personnel ==
As listed in liner notes.

- Michael Black - background vocals
- Max Carl - background vocals
- Dan Dugmore - steel guitar
- Thom Flora - background vocals
- Larry Franklin - fiddle
- Paul Franklin - steel guitar
- Rob Hajacos - fiddle
- John Hobbs - keyboards
- Dann Huff - electric guitar
- Josh Leo - electric guitar
- Brent Mason - electric guitar
- Greg Morrow - drums
- Nashville String Machine - strings
- Craig Nelson - bass guitar
- Robert Ellis Orrall - background vocals
- Michael Peterson - lead vocals, acoustic guitar
- Tom Roady - percussion
- Scotty Sanders - steel guitar
- Darrell Scott - acoustic guitar, mandolin
- Biff Watson - acoustic guitar

Crowd noise on "Love's Great": Steven Bliss, Pat "The Sergeant" Finch, Chad Gates, Curtis Green, Rick Henegar, Rusty Jones, Dillon Leo, Brooke Lundy, Susan E. Niles, Jake Orrall, Jamin Orrall, Justine Orrall, Amanda Peterson, Lauren Peterson, Gene Pistilli, Steve Pope, Annie Price, Michael Puryear, Gavin Reilly, Arlos Smith, Neal Spielberg, Peter "Boston" Strickland.

== Charts ==
=== Weekly charts ===
Chart (1997)	Peak position
Canadian Country Albums (RPM)	13
US Billboard 200	115
US Top Country Albums (Billboard)	17
US Top Heatseekers Albums (Billboard)	2

=== Year-end charts ===
Chart (1997)	Position
US Top Country Albums (Billboard)	68
Chart (1998)	Position
US Top Country Albums (Billboard)	36

== Certifications ==
Region	Certification	Certified units/sales
United States (RIAA)	Gold	500,000^{^}
^{^} Shipments figures based on certification alone.
