= When the Bartender Cries =

Single by Michael Peterson

from the album Michael Peterson
- Released: May 30, 1998
- Genre: Country
- Length: 3:43
- Label: Reprise
- Songwriter(s): Michael Peterson, Hunter Davis
- Producer(s): Robert Ellis Orrall, Josh Leo

Michael Peterson singles chronology
"Too Good to Be True" (1998)	"When the Bartender Cries" (1998)	"By the Book" (1998)

"When the Bartender Cries" is a song co-written and recorded by American country music artist Michael Peterson. It was released in June 1998 as the fourth single from the album Michael Peterson. The song reached No. 37 on the Billboard Hot Country Singles & Tracks chart. The song was written by Peterson and Hunter Davis.

== Chart performance ==
Chart (1998)	Peak position
US Hot Country Songs (Billboard)	37
Canadian RPM Country Tracks	31
