= Where Do I Fit in the Picture =

Single by Clay Walker

from the album Clay Walker
- B-side: "Money Can't Buy"
- Released: February 1994
- Genre: Country
- Length: 3:57
- Label: Giant
- Songwriter: Clay Walker
- Producer: James Stroud

Clay Walker singles chronology
"Live Until I Die" (1993)	"Where Do I Fit in the Picture" (1994)	"Dreaming with My Eyes Open" (1994)

"Where Do I Fit in the Picture" is a song written and recorded by American country music singer Clay Walker. It was released in February 1994 as the third single from his self-titled debut album. It peaked at number 11 in the United States and reached number 6 in Canada. Before its single release, it was the B-side to Walker's debut single "What's It to You".

== Critical reception ==
Logan Neill of the St. Petersburg Times wrote, "The haunting Where Do I Fit in the Picture gave evidence that he takes his singing seriously. Shelly Fabian of About.com called it a "steel-soaked country weeper". Leeann Ward of Country Universe listed "Where Do I Fit in the Picture" as the 382nd best country single of the 1990s and wrote, "Sure, Walker milks this forlorn ballad for all it’s worth, but his ability to dramatically emote is the success of his trademark tear-soaked voice."

== Music video ==
Walker released a music video in 1994 for the song which was directed by Michael Merriman.

== Chart position ==
=== Charts ===
Chart (1994)	Peak position
Canada Country Singles (RPM)	6
US Hot Country Songs (Billboard)	11

=== Year-end charts ===
Chart (1994)	Position
Canada Country Tracks (RPM)	87
