= Live Until I Die =

Single by Clay Walker

from the album Clay Walker
- B-side: "Silence Speaks for Itself"
- Released: October 21, 1993
- Recorded: 1993
- Genre: Country
- Length: 2:50
- Label: Giant
- Songwriter: Clay Walker
- Producer: James Stroud

Clay Walker singles chronology
"What's It to You" (1993)	"Live Until I Die" (1993)	"Where Do I Fit in the Picture" (1994)

"Live Until I Die" is a song written and recorded by American country music singer Clay Walker. It was released in October 1993 as the second single from his self-titled debut album. The song reached the top of the Billboard Hot Country Singles & Tracks chart.

== Background ==
Walker revealed in American Cowboy that his grandmother became the inspiration for the song. After building her a house to live in and after she moved in Walker became inspired to write the song. Walker also stated in an interview with the Houston Chronicle, "My grandpa, who was her husband, is really who started all this off. He used to be a singer, Ernest Elbert Walker, `the Blues Man.' He played on a local radio station. He taught my dad and my uncle, and my dad and my uncle taught me."

In an interview with the Los Angeles Times Walker said, "I grew up in a rural area. My grandmother had an 84-acre tract of land outside the city limits. We had a farm with lots of animals. It was different than growing up downtown, where you might be riding a bicycle in the street and stuff like that. The part in 'Live Until I Die' where I talk about muddy roads and muddy feet--well, I walked those muddy roads. That song is very dear to me, in fact. It's like autobiography. I think everybody has one point in his life when he's a child or a teenager that he wishes he could go back to, and that's mine. Those memories are very fond memories to me."

During an interview with the San Angelo Standard-Times Walker said, "I wrote a song, ‘Live Until I Die,’ — it's about my life. We literally lived off the land, raised our own livestock, we hunted — there were very few things that were store-bought on our table. I learned accountability and responsibility early on in life. I remember in the wintertime, waking up at 5 a.m. and having ice in my rubber boots. I had to feed my animals before I could eat. I wouldn't trade those values for the world."

Walker revealed in Country Weekly, "The song kind of wrote itself, there was no struggle at all. Melody and words all came to me at the same time, and I wrote it in one night. It was like I was on this road - and it was the right road the whole time." Walker also said, "I never really had confidence in my voice at that time. My goal was to pitch it to Randy Travis or Clint Black, because I wanted to get a cut, thinking that would lead to a record deal of my own."

Walker told SUCCESS that he wrote the song when he was 17 and called the song "an autobiography put to music." Walker also said, "I came from a poor family, and that poverty acted as my motivation to find a different way. Some people are happy with a little, but those who are not have the power to achieve all they can envision." When asked about if he had written a song about multiple sclerosis, Walker told United Press International, "I have not specifically written a song about MS, but that is definitely an intention. I'm ready at this point to be able to put something in words that makes sense. There's a song that I wrote when I first came out and it's called "Live Until I Die." One of the lines in that song is "I don't worry about things that I can't change." I have to look at a mess and say, "I can't let this bother me, I can't let it conquer me."

== Content ==
The narrator in the song discusses how he has not changed since he was a kid and how he does not want to worry about the future; he wants to live for the day and take it one at a time.

== Critical reception ==
Larry Flick of Billboard wrote "Walker follows his No. 1 debut single, "What's It To You," with an uptempo testimony to the virtues of always staying the same. Kevin John Coyne of Country Universe listed "Live Until I Die" as the 127th best country single of the 1990s and wrote, "This is one of the few instances when the theme of celebrating a carefree life is set to a pretty melody and restrained production."

== Music video ==
The music video, directed by Marc Ball, features Walker singing and playing his guitar with friends and traveling down a river on a boat. After reaching the shore, Walker and his friends set up and organize a baseball game. Some members of the community watch the baseball game while others play horseshoes, Frisbee, and jump rope. As it gets later in the day, the community builds a bonfire and Walker plays alongside it and the town claps and cheers. The video was filmed in the community of Rome, TN (Smith County) on the bank of the Cumberland River. The former Rome Ferry once operated at this site and what remains of the ferry can be seen in the background of the video.

== Charts ==
"Live Until I Die" debuted at number 67 on the U.S. Billboard Hot Country Singles & Tracks chart for the week of October 30, 1993. It reached Number One for the chart week of January 29, 1994 after twenty weeks on the chart, giving Clay his second consecutive Number One single. It also peaked at number 1 on the RPM Country Tracks charts in Canada.

=== Charts ===
Chart (1993–1994)	Peak position
Canada Country Singles (RPM)	1
US Bubbling Under Hot 100 (Billboard)	7
US Hot Country Songs (Billboard)	1

=== Year-end charts ===
Chart (1994)	Peak position
Canada Country Tracks (RPM)	15
US Country Songs (Billboard)	44
