= All the Right Moves (Jennifer Warnes and Chris Thompson song) =

Single by Jennifer Warnes and Chris Thompson

from the album All the Right Moves
- Released: 1983
- Length: 3:57
- Songwriter(s): Tom Snow; Barry Alfonso

Jennifer Warnes singles chronology
"Nights Are Forever" (1983)	"All the Right Moves" (1983)	"Simply Meant To Be" (1983)

"All the Right Moves" is a 1983 song by Jennifer Warnes and Chris Thompson with music by Tom Snow and lyrics by Barry Alfonso from the film, All the Right Moves. The single reached No. 85 in the Billboard Hot 100 singles chart in the United States.
