= Boom! It Was Over =

Single by Robert Ellis Orrall

from the album Flying Colors
- B-side: "Flying Colors"
- Released: October 1992
- Genre: Country
- Length: 2:36
- Label: RCA Nashville
- Songwriters: Robert Ellis Orrall, Bill Lloyd
- Producers: Steve Marcantonio, Robert Ellis Orrall, Josh Leo

Robert Ellis Orrall singles chronology
"I Couldn't Say No" (1983)	"Boom! It Was Over" (1992)	"A Little Bit of Her Love" (1993)

"Boom! It Was Over" is a song co-written and recorded by American country music artist Robert Ellis Orrall. It was released in October 1992 as the first single from the album Flying Colors. The song reached number 19 on the Billboard Hot Country Singles & Tracks chart. The song was written by Orrall and Bill Lloyd.

== Chart performance ==
Chart (1992–1993)	Peak position
Canada Country Singles (RPM)	39
US Hot Country Songs (Billboard)	19
