= Dreaming with My Eyes Open =

Single by Clay Walker

from the album Clay Walker
- B-side: "Money Can't Buy (The Love We Had)"
- Released: May 27, 1994
- Genre: Country
- Length: 3:30 (album version); 3:18 (single version)
- Label: Giant
- Songwriter: Tony Arata
- Producer: James Stroud

Clay Walker singles chronology
"Where Do I Fit in the Picture" (1994)	"Dreaming with My Eyes Open" (1994)	"If I Could Make a Living" (1994)

"Dreaming with My Eyes Open" is a song written by Tony Arata and recorded by American country music singer Clay Walker. It was released on May 27, 1994, as the fourth and final single from his self-titled debut album, and was featured in the soundtrack to the film The Thing Called Love. The song reached the top of the Billboard Hot Country Singles & Tracks (now Hot Country Songs) chart.

== Background ==
During an interview, Walker stated, "On my very first CD there was a song called "Dreaming with My Eyes Open"—an up-tempo, fast-beat song. I almost considered not recording it. It didn't strike me as a song I could sing great, but my producer talked me into it. It became one of the most played songs of that year, and today, every time I sing it, it gets more and more special to me. It says I'm going to do my dreaming with my eyes wide open. That's what we all have to do with MS [Walker was diagnosed with multiple sclerosis in 1996]. Dreaming with eyes open is a vision. When you close 'em, it's just a dream."

== Critical reception ==
Larry Flick of Billboard wrote "Walker has played a hell of a good game at radio, and urged along by a relentless rhythm track, he hits this one right out of the park. It'll take a few more innings to know for sure, but with the right coaching Walker could become the next country music MVP."

Tara Seetharam of Country Universe listed "Dreaming with My Eyes Open" as the 392nd best country single of the 1990s and wrote, "His infectious pledge to live in the moment is as effective as country’s finest inspirational ballads because it’s firmly grounded in reality."

== Music video ==
The music video was directed by Michael Merriman and premiered in mid-1994. It features Walker playing outside a BBQ restaurant south of Austin, Texas near a dirt road waiting for a ride. Eventually a woman in a pickup truck picks him up and they drive down rural roads. They reach a farm where they are goofing off together while Walker plays guitar for the woman.

== Charts ==
The song debuted at No. 51 on the Hot Country Singles & Tracks chart dated June 11, 1994. It charted for 20 weeks on that chart, reaching number one on the chart dated August 27, 1994, marking Walker's third number-one single.

=== Weekly charts ===
Chart (1994)	Peak position
Canada Country Singles (RPM)	1
US Hot Country Songs (Billboard)	1

=== Year-end charts ===
Chart (1994)	Position
Canada Country Tracks (RPM)	32
US Country Songs (Billboard)	4
