= Flying Colors (Robert Ellis Orrall album) =

Studio album by Robert Ellis Orrall
- Released: February 23, 1993
- Genre: Country
- Length: 33:33
- Label: RCA Nashville
- Producers: Josh Leo; Steve Marcantonio; Robert Ellis Orrall

Robert Ellis Orrall chronology
Contain Yourself (1984)	Flying Colors (1993)

Singles from Flying Colors
- 1. "Boom! It Was Over" Released: October 1992; 2. "A Little Bit of Her Love" Released: February 1993; 3. "Every Day When I Get Home" Released: June 1993

Professional ratings
Review scores
Source	Rating
Allmusic	link

Flying Colors is a studio album by American singer-songwriter Robert Ellis Orrall, released on February 23, 1993 via RCA Records. Although it was his fourth studio album overall, it was his first and only solo album of mainstream country music, as opposed to his more rock-oriented albums in the 1980s. The tracks "Boom! It Was Over", "A Little Bit of Her Love" and "Every Day When I Get Home" were released as singles.

Although Orrall never recorded a solo album after Flying Colors, he would later team up with Curtis Wright to record one album as the duo Orrall & Wright. In addition, Orrall has recorded several albums of indie rock as a member of the band Monkey Bowl.

== Reception ==
In his 4.5 star (out of a possible five) star review for allmusic, Roch Parisien said that "[Orrall]'s vocals come across with a throaty, good-nature[d] charm reminiscent of Huey Lewis." He went on to say that "if you ever wondered what Huey would sound like with better melodies and a country backing, this disc's for you."

== Track listing ==
No.	Title	Writer(s)	Length
1.	"A Little Bit of Her Love"	Robert Ellis Orrall, Lonnie Wilson	2:45
2.	"Boom! It Was Over"	Orrall, Bill Lloyd	2:36
3.	"Every Day When I Get Home"	Orrall, Gary Cotton	3:36
4.	"It's My Lucky Day"	Orrall, Curtis Wright, Billy Spencer	2:57
5.	"I'm Learning as You Go"	Orrall, Wright, Spencer	3:27
6.	"True Believer"	Orrall, David Malloy, Richard "Spady" Brannan	3:38
7.	"What Would It Take"	Orrall, Malloy, Brannan	3:41
8.	"'Til The Tears Fell"	Orrall, Joe Doyle	4:11^{A}
9.	"I'm Ready When You Are"	Orrall, Monty Powell	2:54
10.	"Flying Colors"	Orrall, Marcus Hummon	3:48

- ^{A}The audio cassette version omits "'Til the Tears Fell".

== Personnel ==
Compiled from liner notes.

Musicians

- Eddie Bayers - drums
- Bruce Bouton - steel guitar
- Richard "Spady" Brannan - bass guitar
- John Catchings - cello
- Bill Cuomo - keyboards
- Dan Dugmore - steel guitar
- Rob Hajacos - fiddle
- Paul Hollowell - keyboards
- Jerome Kimbrough - acoustic guitar
- Bernie Leadon - acoustic guitar
- Josh Leo - electric guitar, acoustic guitar
- Chris Leuzinger - electric guitar
- Brent Mason - electric guitar
- Vince Melamed - keyboards
- Steve Nathan - keyboards
- Robert Ellis Orrall - lead vocals
- Gary Prim - keyboards
- Michael Rhodes - bass guitar
- Tom Roady - percussion
- Leland Sklar - bass guitar
- Steuart Smith - electric guitar
- Bobby Taylor - oboe
- Biff Watson - acoustic guitar
- John Willis - electric guitar
- Lonnie Wilson - drums

Technical

- Mike Bridges - recording ("Flying Colors") only
- Jeff Giedt - engineering
- Dave Latto - second engineering
- Josh Leo - production
- Steve Marcantonio - production, recording, mixing
- Russ Martin - second engineering
- Robert Ellis Orrall - production
- Denny Purcell - mastering

Background vocalists

- Larry Byrom
- Paul Gregg
- Marcus Hummon
- Larry Michael Lee
- Robert Ellis Orrall
- Jim Photoglo
- John Wesley Ryles
- Karen Staley
- Larry Stewart
- Harry Stinson
- Dennis Wilson
- Lonnie Wilson
- Curtis Wright

"Boom-ers and Boom-ettes" on "Boom! It Was Over"

- Bart Allmand
- Barbara Behler
- Alison Booth
- Theresa Durst
- Paula Erickson
- Miranda Granger
- Jill Humphrey
- Zac Taylor-Jarrett
- Tavenner King
- Dave Latto
- Steve Marcantonio
- Judy Matter
- Greg McCarn
- Ginger McFadden
- Claudine Sartor
- Billy Spencer
- Carolyn Stewart
- Norman Taylor
- Dyanne Vinyard
- Shane Wilson
