= Michael Peterson (singer) =

American country music singer (born 1959)

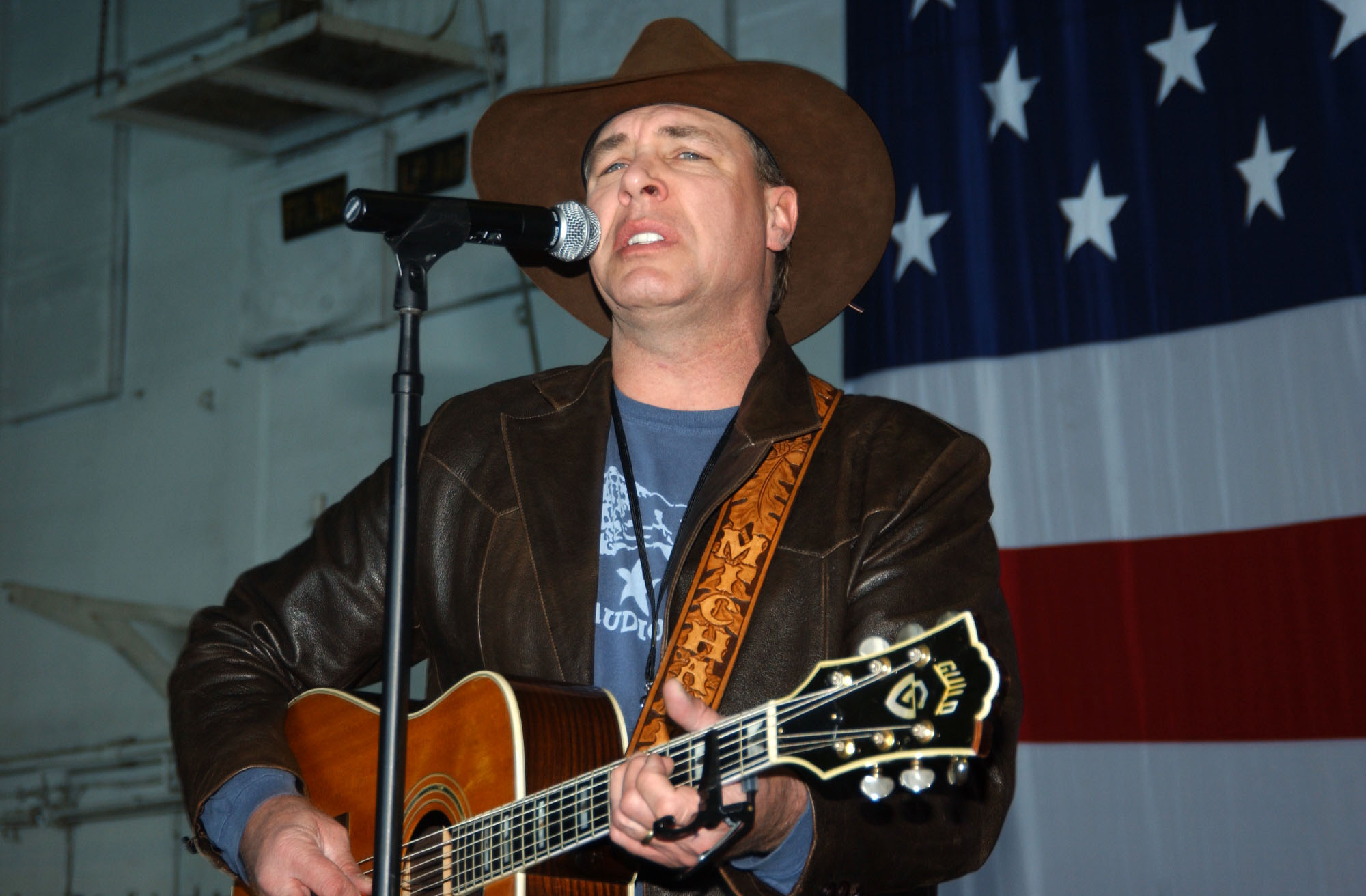
- Michael Peterson performing aboard USS Theodore Roosevelt, December 2005

Background information
- Birth name: Michael James Peterson
- Born: August 7, 1959 (age 66); Tucson, Arizona, United States
- Genres: Country
- Occupation: Singer-songwriter
- Instrument(s): Vocals, guitar
- Years active: 1986–present
- Labels: Sparrow, Reprise, Monument
- Website: michaelpetersonmusic.com

Michael James Peterson (born August 7, 1959) is an American country music artist. He made his debut on the country music scene in 1997 with his second self-titled album (following his 1986 release featuring contemporary Christian songs), which produced five Top 40 hits on Billboards Hot Country Singles & Tracks, including the Number One hit "From Here to Eternity". Peterson's second album, 1999's Being Human, produced two more chart singles, and a third album, 2004's Modern Man, was issued only in Europe. Peterson also made a cameo appearance on an episode of Walker, Texas Ranger.

== Biography ==
Michael Peterson was born in Tucson, Arizona, on August 7, 1959. At an early age, he was influenced by the music that his grandmother listened to, such as Cole Porter and Roger Miller.

After attending high school at Richland High School in Richland, WA, Peterson later earned a football scholarship to Pacific Lutheran University, where he won a national championship. One of his teammates, Brad Westering, was also working as a producer for Deniece Williams at the time. Through Westering, Peterson got the opportunity to write songs for Williams, as well as gospel headliners The Imperials. This all led to the production of Peterson's first release, "Michael Peterson", a collection of contemporary Christian songs, on Sparrow Records in 1986. Eventually, Peterson traveled to Nashville, Tennessee, where he started working as a professional songwriter, collaborating with other writers such as Josh Leo and Robert Ellis Orrall.

=== Michael Peterson ===
Orrall suggested that Peterson sign to a recording contract, and in December 1996, Peterson was signed to Reprise Records, a division of the Warner Music Group. His debut single, "Drink, Swear, Steal & Lie", was released that year, charting at No. 3 on the Billboard country charts and No. 86 on the Billboard Hot 100. It was the lead-off single to Peterson's self-titled debut album (not to be confused with the Christian album of the same name from 1986), which also produced four more chart singles. The second one, "From Here to Eternity", became Peterson's first and only Number One hit, while "Too Good to Be True" reached No. 8. Following it was "When the Bartender Cries" at No. 37 and "By the Book" at No. 19. The album was certified gold by the RIAA for shipping 500,000 copies in the U.S. Also in 1997, Peterson was named Male Artist of the Year by Billboard.

In 1998, Peterson appeared on Jenny Simpson's 1998 self-titled album, singing duet vocals on "Grow Young with You". Peterson made a guest appearance on a 1998 episode of Walker, Texas Ranger called "Eyes of a Ranger."

=== Being Human ===
Peterson released his second album, Being Human, in 1999. Its lead-off single, "Somethin' 'bout a Sunday", failed to reach top 40, and "Sure Feels Real Good" peaked at No. 39. Also in 1999, Peterson co-wrote the title track to Travis Tritt's album No More Looking over My Shoulder, which was released as a single. After a Super Hits album for the label, Peterson exited Warner Music Group.

=== Modern Man ===
After his departure from Warner, Peterson signed to Monument Records Nashville. His third studio album, Modern Man, was to have been released in 2002 for the label. Although its title track and "Lesson in Goodbye" both entered the country charts (with the former being the highest-debuting single of his career), the album itself was not issued in the US due to a restructuring of the label's parent company. AGR, a European record label, acquired the album and issued it in Europe in 2004. Six singles were released from it in Europe, including Peterson's own rendition of "No More Looking over My Shoulder." Also included on the album was the track "Right About Now", which Ty Herndon later released from his 2007 album of the same name.

=== After Modern Man ===
Peterson's songs have been covered by a number of artists. Though his last charting single was in 2002, he continues to release albums and performs at military benefits.

== Discography ==
=== Studio albums ===
Title	Album details	Peak chart positions				Certifications (sales thresholds)
Title	Album details	US Country	US	US Heat	CAN Country	Certifications (sales thresholds)
Michael Peterson	Release date: January 1, 1986; Label: Sparrow Records	—	—	—	—	
Michael Peterson	Release date: July 15, 1997; Label: Reprise Records	17	115	2	13	US: Gold
Being Human	Release date: June 8, 1999; Label: Reprise Records	32	—	20	—	
Modern Man	Release date: May 21, 2004; Label: AGR	—	—	—	—	
Down on the Farm	Release date: January 16, 2006; Label: Midnight Music	—	—	—	—	
In Black	Release date: September 15, 2007; Label: self-released	—	—	—	—	
Grave to the Cradle	Release date: June 13, 2008; Label: Beyond Music	—	—	—	—	
Baby I'm Sticking With You	Release date: May 1, 2009; Label: Beyond Music	—	—	—	—	
You Can Hear A Pin Drop	Release date: November 6, 2009; Label: self-released	—	—	—	—	
We Are Veterans	Release date: August 30, 2013; Label: self-released	—	—	—	—	
"—" denotes releases that did not chart

=== Compilation albums ===
Title	Album details
Super Hits	Release date: May 16, 2000; Label: Warner Bros. Nashville
Drink, Swear, Steal & Lie	Release date: December 29, 2017; Label: 37 Records

=== Singles ===
Year	Single	Peak chart positions			Album
Year	Single	US Country	US	CAN Country	Album
1997	"Drink, Swear, Steal & Lie"	3	86	2	Michael Peterson
1997	"From Here to Eternity"	1	—	11	Michael Peterson
1998	"Too Good to Be True"	8	—	5	Michael Peterson
1998	"When the Bartender Cries"	37	—	31	Michael Peterson
1998	"By the Book"	19	—^{A}	22	Michael Peterson
1999	"Somethin' 'bout a Sunday"	45	—	77	Being Human
1999	"Sure Feels Real Good"	39	—	38	Being Human
2002	"Modern Man"	44	—	—	Modern Man
2002	"Lesson in Goodbye"	58	—	—	Modern Man
"—" denotes releases that did not chart

- ^{A}"By the Book" did not enter the Hot 100, but peaked at number 1 on Bubbling Under Hot 100 Singles, which acts as a 25-song extension of the Hot 100.

=== Music videos ===
Year	Video	Director
1997	"Drink, Swear, Steal & Lie"	Tim Hamilton
1997	"From Here to Eternity"	Steven Goldmann
1998	"Too Good to Be True"	Steven Goldmann
1998	"When the Bartender Cries"	chris rogers
1999	"Sure Feels Real Good"	David Hogan
2002	"Modern Man"	Steven Goldmann
2007	"I Remember America"	N/A
2008	"The Warriors Anthem"	N/A
2009	"I'm A Soldier"	N/A
2009	"You Can Hear A Pin Drop"	N/A

== Awards and nominations ==
Year	Organization	Award	Nominee/Work	Result
1998	Academy of Country Music Awards	Top New Male Vocalist	Michael Peterson	Nominated
1998	TNN/Music City News Awards	Male Star of Tomorrow	Michael Peterson	Nominated
1998	Country Music Association Awards	Horizon Award	Michael Peterson	Nominated
1999	TNN/Music City News Awards	Male Star of Tomorrow	Michael Peterson	Won
