= The Godfather Part II (soundtrack) =

Soundtrack album by Nino Rota & Carmine Coppola
- Released: 1974
- Genre: Soundtrack
- Length: 38:28
- Label: ABC
- Producer: Tom Mack

The Godfather chronology
The Godfather (1972)	The Godfather Part II (1974)	The Godfather Part III (1990)

The Godfather Part II is the Academy Award winning soundtrack from the movie of the same name, released in 1974 by ABC and in 1991 on compact disc by MCA. The original score was composed by Nino Rota, conducted by Carmine Coppola, who also provided source music for the film, and performed by the Hollywood Studio Symphony. Rota expands upon two of the three main themes from the first film: "The Godfather Waltz" and "Michael's Theme", while "The Love Theme" from the first film makes a brief appearance during a flashback sequence ("Remember Vito Andolini"). There are several new themes, including one for Kay (Diane Keaton) and two for young Vito (Robert De Niro): "The Immigrant Theme" and "The Tarantella", introduced in "A New Carpet".

Professional ratings
Review scores
Source	Rating
Allmusic	5/5 stars
Filmtracks	5/5 stars

== Track listing ==
No.	Title	Writer(s)	Length
1.	"Main Title/The Immigrant"	Nino Rota	3:27
2.	"A New Carpet"	Nino Rota	2:00
3.	"Kay"	Nino Rota	3:00
4.	"Ev'ry Time I Look In Your Eyes/After the Party"	Carmine Coppola/Nino Rota	2:35
5.	"Vito and Abbandando"	Nino Rota	2:38
6.	"Senza Mamma/Ciuri-Ciuri/Napule Ve Salute"	Francesco Pennino/Francesco Paolo Frontini	2:36
7.	"The Godfathers at Home"	Nino Rota	2:35
8.	"Remember Vito Andolini"	Nino Rota	2:52
9.	"Michael Comes Home"	Nino Rota	2:19
10.	"Marcia Stilo Italiano"	Carmine Coppola	2:02
11.	"Ninna Nanna a Michele"	Nino Rota/Francesco Pennino	2:22
12.	"The Brothers Mourn"	Nino Rota	3:21
13.	"The Murder of Don Fanucci"	Carmine Coppola	2:50
14.	"End Title"	Nino Rota	3:51

== Awards and nominations ==
Award	Category	Nominee	Result
47th Academy Awards	Best Original Dramatic Score	Carmine Coppola and Nino Rota	Won
29th British Academy Film Awards	Best Film Music	Nino Rota	Nominated
32nd Golden Globe Awards	Best Original Score	Nino Rota	Nominated

== Album chart ==
- 1975: The Godfather Part II: Pop albums: #184

== Credits ==
- Composer, conductor, performer, and primary artist: Carmine Coppola
- Orchestra: Hollywood Studio Symphony
- Primary artist: Livio Giorgi
- Performer and primary artist: Beres Hammond
- Producer: Tom Mack
- Remixing: Thorne Nogar
- Mixing: John Norman
- Primary artist: Nino Palermo
- Composer: Giovanni Rota
- Composer and primary artist: Nino Rota

== Release history ==
List of release dates, formats, label, editions and reference
Date	Format(s)	Label(s)	Ref(s)
1974	Vinyl	ABC	
2008	CD	Universal Distribution	
2010	CD	Universal Distribution	
2010	Digital download	MCA/Geffen Records	
2015	Vinyl	MOVATM	
2020	CD	Universal Distribution	
