= The Godfather Part III (soundtrack) =

Soundtrack album by Carmine Coppola
- Released: 18 December 1990
- Genre: Soundtrack romanticism
- Length: 54:16
- Label: Columbia Records
- Producer: Francis Ford Coppola

The Godfather chronology
The Godfather Part II (1974)	The Godfather Part III (1990)

Singles from The Godfather Part III
- 1. "Promise Me You'll Remember (Love Theme from The Godfather Part III)" Released: 1990

Professional ratings
Review scores
Source	Rating
Allmusic	link
Filmtracks	link

The Godfather Part III is the soundtrack from the film of the same name, released in 1990 by Columbia Records.

== Track listing ==
1. "Main Title" (composed by Nino Rota) – 0:42
2. "The Godfather Waltz" (composed by Rota) – 1:10
3. "Marcia Religiosa" (composed by Carmine Coppola and Rota) – 2:51
4. "Michael's Letter" (composed by Rota) – 1:08
5. "The Immigrant"/"Love Theme from The Godfather Part III" (composed by Rota and Coppola) – 2:36
6. "The Godfather Waltz" (composed by Rota) – 1:24
7. "To Each His Own" (composed by Jay Livingston and Ray Evans) – 3:21 performed by Al Martino
8. "Vincent's Theme" (composed by Coppola and Rota) – 1:49
9. "Altobello" (composed by Coppola and Rota) – 2:10
10. "The Godfather Intermezzo" (composed by Coppola and Rota) – 3:22
11. "Sicilian Medley: Va, Pensiero (composed by Giuseppe Verdi, arranged by Coppola) / Danza Tarantella (composed by Coppola) / Mazurka (Alla Siciliana) (composed by Coppola) – 2:10
12. "Promise Me You'll Remember (Love Theme from The Godfather Part III)" (composed by Coppola, lyrics by John Bettis, arranged by Lennie Niehaus) – 5:11 performed by Harry Connick Jr., conducted by Lennie Niehaus
13. "Preludio and Siciliana" – 8:15 (composed by Pietro Mascagni, excerpt from Cavalleria Rusticana)
14. "A Casa Amiche" – 1:59 (composed by Pietro Mascagni, excerpt from Cavalleria Rusticana)
15. "Preghiera" – 5:30 (composed by Pietro Mascagni, excerpt from Cavalleria Rusticana)
16. "Finale" – 8:12 (composed by Pietro Mascagni, excerpt from Cavalleria Rusticana)
17. "Coda: The Godfather Finale" (composed by Rota) – 2:27 violin soloist: Murray Adler

=== (Songs listed in film's credits) ===
- "To Each His Own" (Livingston, Evans) – performed by Al Martino
- "Vitti 'Na Crozza" (Francesco Li Causi)
- "Eh, Cumpari" (Julius LaRosa, Archie Bleyer)
- "Beyond the Blue Horizon" (Leo Robin, Richard A. Whiting, W. Franke Harling)
- "Lover" (Lorenz Hart, Richard Rodgers)
- "Senza Perdono" (Francesco Pennino)
- "Miracle Man" (Elvis Costello) – written and performed by Elvis Costello
- "Dimmi, Dimmi, Dimmi" (Carmine Coppola) – arrangement by Celso Valli
- "Gregorian Chant"
- "Brucia La Terra" (Nino Rota, Giuseppe Rinaldi)
- "Santa Rosalia" (Tony Cucchiara; from La Baronessa di Carini) – performed by Grace Farrugia, Maria Tulumello, Vincenzina Galante & Josephine Attardo; produced by Harry Connick Jr. and Stephan R. Goldman
- "Promise Me You'll Remember (Love Theme from The Godfather Part III)" (Carmine Coppola, John Bettis) – performed by Harry Connick Jr.
- excerpts from Cavalleria Rusticana

== Awards and nominations ==
- 1990 Academy Award nomination: Best Song — "Promise Me You'll Remember" — John Bettis (lyrics), Carmine Coppola (music)
- 1990 Academy Award nomination: Best Original Score — Carmine Coppola
- 1990 Fennecus Award winner: Adapted Score — Carmine Coppola
- 1990 Fennecus Award nomination: Song Performance — In Studio — "Promise Me You'll Remember" — Harry Connick Jr.
- 1990 Apex Scroll Award winner: Original Song — "Promise Me You'll Remember" — John Bettis (lyrics), Carmine Coppola (music)
- 1990 Apex Scroll Award nomination: Original Song Score/Adaptation/Compilation — Carmine Coppola
- 1991 Golden Globe Award nomination: Best Original Song — "Promise Me You'll Remember" — John Bettis (lyrics), Carmine Coppola (music)

== Charts ==
- 1991 The Godfather Part III The Billboard 200 No. 102
