= From Here to Eternity (Michael Peterson song) =

Single by Michael Peterson

from the album Michael Peterson
- Released: September 8, 1997
- Genre: Country
- Length: 3:36
- Label: Reprise
- Songwriters: Robert Ellis Orrall; Michael Peterson
- Producers: Robert Ellis Orrall; Josh Leo

Michael Peterson singles chronology
"Drink, Swear, Steal & Lie" (1997)	"From Here to Eternity" (1997)	"Too Good to Be True" (1998)

"From Here to Eternity" is a song recorded by American country music artist Michael Peterson, who co-wrote the song with Robert Ellis Orrall. It was released in September 1997 as the second single from his first album, Michael Peterson, becoming his only number one hit on the Billboard Hot Country Singles & Tracks (now Hot Country Songs) charts that year.

== Content ==
Peterson claims that the single is a "pretty spiritual song" and that he wrote the song "about faith and it came out as a country song". It is set at a moderate tempo with a vocal range from D4 to A5. The song begins in the key of G major, and transposes a whole step upward to A major halfway through the final chorus.

The song's protagonist is proposing to his lover, vowing that he will always love her, be by her side and give her whatever she needs for the rest of their lives together as a married couple ("from here to eternity.")

== Critical reception ==
Deborah Evans Price, of Billboard magazine reviewed the song favorably, calling it a "well-written ballad, ripe with sweet emotion." She goes on to say that Peterson's vocal "perfectly captures the warmth and feeling in the lyric."

== Music video ==
The music video, directed by Steven Goldmann, was filmed in Point Reyes and west Marin County, California.

== Chart positions ==
"From Here to Eternity" debuted at number 56 on the U.S. Billboard Hot Country Singles & Tracks for the week of September 13, 1997.

Chart (1997)	Peak position
Canada Country Singles (RPM)	11
US Hot Country Songs (Billboard)	1
