= Nights Are Forever (song) =

Single by Jennifer Warnes

from the album Twilight Zone: The Movie
- B-side: "Kick the Can" (Jerry Goldsmith)
- Released: June 1983
- Genre: Soft rock
- Length: 3:39
- Label: Warner Bros.
- Composer: Jerry Goldsmith
- Lyricist: John Bettis
- Producers: Bruce Botnick; James Newton Howard

Jennifer Warnes singles chronology
"Up Where We Belong" (1982)	"Nights Are Forever" (1983)	"All the Right Moves" (1983)

"Nights Are Forever" is a song written by composer Jerry Goldsmith and lyricist John Bettis that was produced by James Newton Howard and performed by Jennifer Warnes for the 1983 anthology film Twilight Zone: The Movie. The single became the follow-up to her duet with Joe Cocker, "Up Where We Belong". "Nights Are Forever" is heard very briefly during the jukebox scene in the segment of the film that was written and directed by John Landis and starred Vic Morrow.

== Critical reception ==
"Nights Are Forever" received praise twice from Billboard magazine. In their review of the single, the editors described it as "a simple, light-rock love song that shows off the clear purity of Warnes' voice and the deft production skills of Botnick and Howard." In their review of the soundtrack of Twilight Zone: The Movie, they called it "excellent".

== Release and commercial performance ==
The song began its 4 weeks "bubbling under" the Billboard Hot 100 in the issue dated July 2 of that year and peaked at 105. The July 23 issue marked its first appearance on the magazine's list of the 50 most popular Adult Contemporary songs in the U.S., where it got as high as number 8 over the course of its 16 weeks there.

== Personnel ==
Credits adapted from the liner notes for the original Twilight Zone: The Movie soundtrack album:

- Jennifer Warnes – vocals
- Bruce Botnick – recorded by, producer
- James Newton Howard – arranger, producer
- Rik Pekkonen – mixdown engineer
- Wendy Waldman – backing vocals
- Joseph Williams – backing vocals

== Charts ==
Chart performance for "Nights Are Forever"
Chart (1983)	Peak position
US Adult Contemporary (Billboard)	8
US Bubbling Under the Hot 100 (Billboard)	105

== Bibliography ==
- Whitburn, Joel (2007), Joel Whitburn Presents Billboard Top Adult Songs, 1961–2006, Record Research, ISBN 978-0898201697
- Whitburn, Joel (2009), Joel Whitburn's Top Pop Singles, 1955–2008, Record Research, ISBN 978-0898201802
