= Twilight Zone: The Movie =

1983 American science fiction horror anthology film

- Theatrical release poster by John Alvin
- Directed by: John Landis; Steven Spielberg; Joe Dante; George Miller
- Screenplay by: John Landis; George Clayton Johnson; Richard Matheson; Melissa Mathison
- Story by: John Landis; George Clayton Johnson; Jerome Bixby; Richard Matheson
- Based on: The Twilight Zone by Rod Serling
- Produced by: Steven Spielberg; John Landis
- Starring: Dan Aykroyd; Albert Brooks; Scatman Crothers; John Lithgow; Vic Morrow; Kathleen Quinlan
- Cinematography: Allen Daviau; John Hora; Stevan Larner
- Edited by: Malcolm Campbell; Tina Hirsch; Michael Kahn; Howard E. Smith
- Music by: Jerry Goldsmith
- Production company: Warner Bros.
- Distributed by: Warner Bros.
- Release date: June 24, 1983
- Running time: 101 minutes
- Country: United States
- Languages: English; French; German; Vietnamese
- Budget: $10 million
- Box office: $42 million

Twilight Zone: The Movie is a 1983 American science fiction fantasy horror anthology film produced by Steven Spielberg and John Landis. Based on Rod Serling's 1959–1964 television series of the same name, the film features four stories directed by Landis, Spielberg, Joe Dante and George Miller. Landis' segment is an original story created for the film, while the segments by Spielberg, Dante, and Miller are remakes of episodes from the original series. The film's cast includes Dan Aykroyd, Albert Brooks, Scatman Crothers, John Lithgow, Vic Morrow, and Kathleen Quinlan. Original series cast members Burgess Meredith, Patricia Barry, Peter Brocco, Murray Matheson, Kevin McCarthy, Bill Mumy, and William Schallert also appear in the film, with Meredith assuming Serling's role as narrator.

The film's production achieved notoriety when Morrow and two illegally hired child actors, Myca Dinh Le and Renee Shin-Yi Chen, were killed in a helicopter crash during the filming of Landis's segment. The deaths led to several years of legal action; although no individuals were found to be criminally liable, new procedures and safety standards were imposed in the filmmaking industry. Upon release by Warner Bros. on June 24, 1983, the film received mixed reviews, with praise directed at Dante and Miller's segments, but criticism towards the segments by Landis and Spielberg. Despite the controversy and mixed reception, it was a commercial success, grossing $42 million on a $10 million budget.

== Plot ==
=== Prologue ===
Two men are in a car traveling along a country road late at night. The conversation turns to what episodes of The Twilight Zone they found scariest. The passenger asks, "Do you want to see something really scary?" and says to pull over. He transforms into a monster and slaughters the driver as the opening sequence begins.

=== "Time Out" ===
William "Bill" Connor is an outspoken bigot who is bitter after being passed over for a promotion at work in favor of his Jewish co-worker Goldman. Drinking in a bar after work with his friends Larry and Ray, Bill utters racist remarks and slurs towards Jews, Blacks, and East Asians, blaming them for America's problems. A Black man sitting nearby asks him to stop. After ranting some more and declaring himself better than the minorities, Bill angrily storms out of the bar and finds himself in Nazi-occupied France during World War II. A pair of SS officers patrolling the streets spot and interrogate him. Bill cannot answer satisfactorily since he does not speak German. A chase around the city ensues, in which Bill is shot in his left arm by one of the German officers. Bill attempts to hide in an apartment of a French family, but the lady of the house quickly betrays him by shouting a warning to the German soldiers. Bill climbs out on a ledge of the building, where he finds himself trapped while the two German officers take pot shots at him standing along the narrow ledge.

Bill falls from the ledge and lands on soft ground, now in the rural South during the Jim Crow era, where a group of Ku Klux Klan members see him as a Black man whom they are about to lynch. Bill, scared and confused, vehemently tries to tell them that he is White, but to no avail. After kicking one Klansman against the burning cross and setting him on fire, Bill breaks free and tries to escape (while still hampered by his bullet wound). He dives into a nearby pond and resurfaces in a jungle of Vietnam during the Vietnam War, being fired at by American soldiers who see him as a member of the Viet Cong. One of the soldiers throws a grenade at Bill. Instead of killing him, the grenade launches him into occupied Europe again. There he is captured by the SS officers and put into an enclosed railroad freight car, along with Jewish prisoners bound for a concentration camp. Bill sees the bar with his friends standing outside, looking for him. He screams for help, but they cannot see or hear him or the train as it pulls away.

=== "Kick the Can" ===
An old man named Mr. Bloom has just moved into Sunnyvale Retirement Home. He listens to the other elders reminisce about the joys they experienced in their youth. Bloom insists that being elderly should not, and need not, prevent them from enjoying life. He invites them to join him, later that night, for a game of kick the can. All agree; however, a grumpy man named Leo Conroy who is fairly skeptical in his outlook on life objects to this, saying that they cannot engage in physical activity because they are all elderly and not children anymore.

While Mr. Conroy sleeps, Mr. Bloom gathers the rest of the residents outside and plays the game, during which they are transformed into childhood versions of themselves. They are ecstatic to be young again, engaging in activities they enjoyed long ago, but their thoughts soon turn to practical matters such as where they will spend the night, since they will no longer be welcomed in the retirement home and their families will not recognize them. They ask to be their true age again and Mr. Bloom grants their wish, satisfied that, as with himself, their minds will remain young. Conroy wakes up and notices that one resident, Mr. Agee, has opted to remain young. Conroy asks for Agee to take him along but Agee tells him that such a thing is impossible. Conroy finally realizes that he does not have to stop enjoying life because of his old age.

The next morning, Mr. Bloom finds Conroy happily kicking a can around the yard; Bloom breaks the fourth wall to assure the audience that "He'll get it." Bloom then departs from Sunnyvale for another retirement home, in order to spread his good-natured magic among other senior citizens.

=== "It's a Good Life" ===
Mild-mannered school teacher Helen Foley, traveling to a new job, visits a rural bar for directions. While talking to the owner, she witnesses a young boy, Anthony, being harassed by a local trying to watch a boxing match. Helen comes to the boy's defense. As Helen leaves the bar, she backs into Anthony with her car in the parking lot, damaging his bicycle. Helen offers Anthony a ride home.

When Helen arrives with Anthony at home, she meets his family: his parents, Uncle Walt, and sister Ethel. Anthony's family are excessively welcoming. Anthony starts to show Helen around the house, while the family rifles through Helen's purse and coat. There is a television set in every room showing cartoons. She comes to the room of another sister, Sara. Helen calls out to the girl, who is in a wheelchair and watching television, and gets no response. Anthony explains that Sara had been in an accident. Helen is not able to see that the girl has no mouth.

Anthony announces that it is time for dinner, which consists of ice cream, candy apples, potato chips and hamburgers topped with peanut butter. Confused at first at the family's unconventional diet, Helen thinks that this is a birthday dinner for Anthony. Ethel complains at the prospect of another birthday; Anthony glares at her and her plate flies out of her hands. Helen attempts to leave but Anthony urges Helen to stay and see Uncle Walt's "hat trick". A top hat appears on top of the television set. Uncle Walt is very nervous about what could be in the hat but he pulls out an ordinary rabbit. Anthony insists on an encore and a large, monstrous rabbit springs from the hat. As Helen attempts to flee, she spills the contents of her purse and Anthony finds a note inside stating "Help us! Anthony is a monster!" When the family points the finger at Ethel, she reveals to Helen that they are not Anthony's real relatives. Anthony brought them to his house to be his surrogate family after he killed his parents and presumably he is doing the same with Helen. In punishment for writing the note, Anthony sends Ethel into the television set where she is pursued and eaten by a cartoon dragon.

Helen attempts to escape, only to have the door blocked by a giant eye. Anthony vents his frustration at everyone being afraid of him, summoning another cartoonish monster out of the television. When Helen tells him to "wish it away", he makes the entire house disappear, taking himself and Helen outside the physical plane of existence. Anthony says that he sent his "family" back where they came from, since they did not want to be with him. He cannot understand why everyone is unhappy with him, since he believes he provided for their every possible desire.

Helen offers to be Anthony's teacher and student and to help him find new, even greater uses for his power. Satisfied that she will never "abandon" him, and having at last foreseen the true end results of his reign of terror, Anthony welcomes Helen's offer and magically brings back her car. As they drive through a barren landscape, meadows filled with bright flowers spring up alongside the road in the pair's wake.

=== "Nightmare at 20,000 Feet" ===
While flying through a violent thunderstorm, airline passenger John Valentine is in a lavatory trying to recover from a panic attack due to a fear of flying. The flight attendants coax Valentine from the lavatory and back to his seat. He is repeatedly assured by the flight attendants that everything is going to be all right, but his nerves and antics disturb the surrounding passengers.

Valentine notices a hideous gremlin on the wing of the plane and spirals into another severe panic. He watches as the creature wreaks havoc on the wing, throwing debris into one of the plane's turbofan engines and causing a flameout. Valentine finally snaps and attempts to break the window with an oxygen canister but is wrestled to the ground by another passenger, a sky marshal. Valentine then takes the marshal's revolver, shoots out the window (causing a breach in the pressurized cabin), and begins firing at the gremlin. This catches the attention of the gremlin, who rushes up to Valentine and bites the gun in half. After they notice that the plane is landing, the gremlin grabs Valentine's face, then simply scolds him for spoiling its fun by wagging its finger in his face. The creature leaps into the sky and flies away as the airplane begins its emergency landing.

On the ground, the police, crew and passengers discuss the incident, writing off Valentine as insane. However, the aircraft maintenance crew arrives and finds the damage to the plane's engines complete with claw marks, while a delirious and incoherent Valentine is wrapped up in a straitjacket and carried off in an ambulance.

Epilogue: The ambulance driver (revealed to be the car passenger from the Prologue) turns to Valentine, remarking, "Heard you had a big scare up there, huh? Wanna see something really scary?"

== Cast and crew ==
=== Prologue ===
- John Landis – Writer, Director
- Albert Brooks as the Driver
- Dan Aykroyd as the Passenger

=== "Time Out" ===
- John Landis – Writer, Director
- Vic Morrow as William "Bill" Connor
- Charles Hallahan as Ray
- Doug McGrath as Larry
- Remus Peets and Kai Wulff as German Officers
- Steven Williams as Bar Patron
- Annette Claudier as French Mother
- Joseph Hieu and Al Leong as Vietnamese
- Stephen Bishop as Charming G.I.
- Thomas Byrd, Vincent J. Isaac, William B. Bill Taylor, and Domingo Ambriz as G.I.'s
- Edward Donno, Michael Milgrom, and John Larroquette as K.K.K.

=== "Kick the Can" ===
- Steven Spielberg – Director
- Screenplay by George Clayton Johnson, Richard Matheson and Melissa Mathison (credited as Josh Rogan), from a screen story by Johnson
- Scatman Crothers as Mr. Bloom
- Murray Matheson as Mr. Agee
  - Evan Richards as Young Mr. Agee
- Bill Quinn as Leo Conroy
- Helen Shaw as Mrs. Dempsey
  - Laura Mooney as Young Mrs. Dempsey
- Selma Diamond as Mrs. Weinstein
  - Tanya Fenmore as Young Mrs. Weinstein
- Peter Brocco as Mr. Mute
  - Christopher Eisenmann as Young Mr. Mute
- Martin Garner as Mr. Weinstein
  - Scott Nemes as Young Mr. Weinstein
- Priscilla Pointer as Miss Cox
- Richard Swingler as Mr. Grey Panther
- Alan Haufrect as Mr. Conroy's Son
- Cheryl Socher as Mr. Conroy's Daughter-In-Law
- Elsa Raven as Nurse No. 2

=== "It's a Good Life" ===
- Joe Dante – Director
- Richard Matheson – Screenplay
- Jerome Bixby – Short story
- Kathleen Quinlan as Helen Foley
- Kevin McCarthy as Uncle Walt
- Jeremy Licht as Anthony
- William Schallert as Father
- Nancy Cartwright as Ethel
- Patricia Barry as Mother
- Dick Miller as Walter Paisley
- Bill Mumy as Tim
- Jeffrey Bannister as Charlie
- Cherie Currie as Sara

=== "Nightmare at 20,000 Feet" ===
- George Miller – Director
- Richard Matheson – Writer
- John Lithgow as John Valentine
- Abbe Lane as Sr. Stewardess
- John Dennis Johnston as Co-Pilot
- Donna Dixon as Jr. Stewardess
- Charles Knapp as Sky Marshal
- Christina Nigra as Little Girl
- Larry Cedar as Creature
- Eduard Franz as Old Man
- Margaret Wheeler as Old Woman
- Jeffrey Weissman as Young Man
- Margaret Fitzgerald as Young Girl

== Production ==
The original idea was to dramatize one story from Rod Serling's original The Twilight Zone television series. After Steven Spielberg became involved, he suggested that three stories be filmed, one directed by him. Spielberg brought in his friend John Landis who shared an enthusiasm for the original series. Joe Dante was developing Gremlins with Steven Spielberg at the time. George Miller was best known for directing Mad Max 2. Dante said "the stories were all supposed to interconnect and characters were supposed to appear in one story and then appear again in the other story".

Landis would write his own story. Richard Matheson was hired to write the other three episodes. These were going to be "Nightmare at 20,000 Feet" (for Miller), "The Monsters are Due on Maple Street" (to be directed by Spielberg) and "It's a Good Life" (to be directed by Dante). Landis' segment script was originally called "Real Life" based on an old short screenplay of his.

The first segment, "Time Out", is a partial reworking, but not a full remake, of the episode "Back There", involving Peter Corrigan (Russell Johnson) who exits a club after a conversation about the feasibility of utilizing time travel to change history, only to find that he has been transported into the past. The premise of the story from there, however, is mashed up with the morality tale of another classic episode, "A Quality of Mercy", in which overly impetuous Lieutenant Katell (Dean Stockwell) finds himself suddenly having swapped places with enemy Lieutenant Yamuri, an experience which teaches him a lesson about empathy. The second segment is a remake of the episode "Kick the Can". The third segment is a remake of the episode "It's a Good Life". The fourth segment is a remake of the episode "Nightmare at 20,000 Feet".

The prologue scene with Dan Aykroyd and Albert Brooks (a nod to the supernatural-based comedy skits featured in later episodes of Serling's post-Twilight Zone anthology television series Night Gallery) was shot before the Vic Morrow helicopter accident. All the other segments were shot after it occurred.

=== Helicopter accident ===
During the filming of the "Time Out" segment directed by Landis on July 23, 1982, at 2:20 a.m., actor Vic Morrow and child actors Myca Dinh Le (age 7) and Renee Shin-Yi Chen (age 6) died in an accident involving a Bell UH-1 helicopter being used on the set. The two child actors were hired in violation of California law, which prohibits child actors from working at night or in proximity to explosions, and requires the presence of a teacher or social worker. During the subsequent trial, Landis denied culpability for the accident, but admitted that their hiring was "wrong".

Producer and co-director Steven Spielberg was so disgusted by Landis' handling of the situation, he ended their friendship and publicly called for the end of the New Hollywood Era, where directors had almost complete control over film. When approached by the press about the accident, he stated, "No movie is worth dying for. I think people are standing up much more now, than ever before, to producers and directors who ask too much. If something isn't safe, it's the right and responsibility of every actor or crew member to yell, 'Cut!'" Co-director George Miller was so repulsed by the entire scenario, he abandoned post-production of his segment without announcement, leaving Joe Dante to supervise editing.

The scenes involving the child actors were not in Landis' original draft for the segment. After Warner Bros. executives Lucy Fisher and Terry Semel objected that the central character of the segment was too unsympathetic, Landis came up with the idea of Morrow's character, Bill Connor, redeeming himself by rescuing two Vietnamese orphans. In the scene that served as the revised ending, Bill was to have traveled back through time again and stumbled into a deserted Vietnamese village where he finds two young Vietnamese children left behind when a U.S. Army helicopter appears and begins shooting at them. Morrow was to take both children under his arms and escape out of the village as the hovering helicopter destroyed the village with multiple explosions. The helicopter pilot Dorcey Wingo had trouble navigating through the fireballs created by pyrotechnic effects for the sequence. A technician on the ground did not know this and detonated two of the pyrotechnic charges close together. The two explosions hit the helicopter's tail rotor and destroyed it, which caused the low-flying helicopter to spin out of control and crash-land on top of Morrow, Le and Chen as they were crossing a small pond away from the village mock-up. All three were killed instantly; Morrow and Le were decapitated by the helicopter's rotor blades, while Chen was crushed to death by one of the struts.

In October 1984, the National Transportation Safety Board (NTSB) issued its report on the accident:

The probable cause of the accident was the detonation of debris-laden high-temperature special effects explosions too near a low-flying helicopter leading to foreign object damage to one rotor blade and delamination due to heat to the other rotor blade, the separation of the helicopter's tail rotor assembly, and the uncontrolled descent of the helicopter. The proximity of the helicopter (around 25 feet off the ground) to the special effects explosions was due to the failure to establish direct communications and coordination between the pilot, who was in command of the helicopter operation, and the film director, who was in charge of the filming operation.

Landis has said that the actual ending of the segment was unaffected by the accident. When asked how the film changed from its initial conception after the accident, Landis replied, "The intercutting between the actions of the KKK and American GIs and the Vietcong and the Nazis became more and more frenetic as [Bill] tried to protect the children. Finally, the Nazis take the children away and shoot them and load him up on the train. We decided not to use any footage of the children. It was a very difficult situation. Do we keep it in the movie? ...And, ultimately, we decided it would be really outrageous to Vic Morrow if we just cut it out of the movie completely." Landis has also said, "There are moments [in the segment] I think work well. When [Bill] is in the cattle car, and he looks back and you see his POV of the bar going by. I think that's an unsettling image."

Le and Chen were being paid under the table to circumvent California's child labor laws. California did not allow children to work at night. Landis opted not to seek a waiver. The casting agents were unaware that the children would be involved in the scene. Associate producer George Folsey Jr. told the children's parents not to tell any firefighters on set that the children were part of the scene and also hid them from a fire safety officer who also worked as a welfare worker. A fire safety officer was concerned the blasts would cause a crash but did not tell Landis of his concerns.

The accident led to civil and criminal action against the filmmakers which lasted nearly a decade. Landis, Folsey, production manager Dan Allingham, Wingo and explosives specialist Paul Stewart were tried and acquitted on charges of manslaughter in a nine-month trial in 1986 and 1987. As a result of the accident, second assistant director Andy House had his name removed from the credits and replaced with the pseudonym Alan Smithee. The incident also resulted in the establishment of the Motion Picture & Entertainment Unit within the CAL FIRE Office of the State Fire Marshal to enforce fire safety regulations and requirements in the entertainment industry.

The accident became the subject of an episode of the 2020 docuseries Cursed Films.

=== Filming other segments ===
Dante later claimed that after the accident, the studio "would probably have shut down the movie, except for the fact that Steven was doing one of the episodes, and they wanted to have a Steven Spielberg movie. So George Miller and I got to make our stories." Spielberg decided to film "Kick the Can" instead of "The Monsters are Due on Maple Street". He had Melissa Mathison rewrite Matheson's script. Some have claimed that Spielberg's heart was not in the project anymore by the time filming began.

Dante later reflected, "there was a lack of oversight that followed the rest of the production, in that nobody wanted to be too closely identified with the picture, because it was in litigation. So when George and I came on to the movie, we were left almost completely alone, and we both got a somewhat jaundiced view, or erroneous view, of what it's like to work at a big studio." The cartoon dragon in "It's A Good Life" was animated by Sally Cruikshank of Quasi at the Quackadero fame.

== Release and legacy ==
Twilight Zone: The Movie opened on June 24, 1983, and received mixed reviews. Roger Ebert of the Chicago Sun-Times rated each segment individually, awarding them (on a scale of four stars): two stars for the prologue and first segment, one-and-a-half stars for the second segment, three-and-a-half stars for the third segment, and three-and-a-half stars for the final segment. Ebert noted that "the surprising thing is, the two superstar directors are thoroughly routed by two less-known directors whose previous credits have been horror and action pictures... Spielberg, who produced the whole project, perhaps sensed that he and Landis had the weakest results, since he assembles the stories in an ascending order of excitement. Twilight Zone starts slow, almost grinds to a halt, and then has a fast comeback."

The New York Times' film critic Vincent Canby called the movie a "flabby, mini-minded behemoth". Imagine magazine's Colin Greenland found it to be "Macabre stuff, but not really very impressive as modern fantastic cinema from four of its grand masters."

=== Reception ===
Contemporary critical reception is still divided. On the review aggregate website Rotten Tomatoes, the film has a 57% "fresh" approval rating, based on 42 reviews, with a rating average of 5.9/10. The critical consensus reads, "The Twilight Zone: The Movie suffers from the typical anthology-film highs and lows, thankfully, the former outnumber the latter." On Metacritic, the film has a score of 44 out of 100, based on eight reviews, indicating "mixed or average reviews." In 2020, Looper included it on their list of "The Most Terrifying Opening Scenes In Horror Films".

Joe Dante, director of "It's a Good Life" and later Gremlins, reflected, "George and I benefited, because the other two episodes weren't all that compelling and we got a lot of press, and it put us both on the map. Of course, George was already on the map, he'd made Road Warrior. I certainly wasn't."

=== Box office ===
According to Box Office Mojo, the film opened at number 4, grossing $6,614,366 in its opening weekend at 1,275 theaters, averaging $5,188 per theater (adjusting to $15,076,555 and a $11,825 average in 2009). It later expanded to 1,288 theaters and ended up grossing $29,450,919 in the United States and Canada. Internationally, it grossed $12.5 million for a worldwide gross of $42 million. Having cost $10 million to make, it was not the enormous hit which executives were looking for but it was still a financial success and it helped stir enough interest for CBS to give the go-ahead to the 1980s TV version of The Twilight Zone.

== Home media ==
The film was issued on VHS, Betamax and LaserDisc by Warner Home Video in the 1980s and was later released on DVD, HD DVD and Blu-ray on 9 October 2007. The 2007 high-definition releases were reviewed on release and (as of the 2010s–2020s) the Warner-issued Blu-ray/DVD editions have become uncommon in retail and are frequently offered on secondary markets by collectors and resellers.

== Novelization ==
Robert Bloch wrote the book adaptation of Twilight Zone: The Movie. Bloch's order of segments does not match the order in the film itself, as he was given the original screenplay to work with, in which "Nightmare at 20,000 Feet" was the second segment, and "Kick the Can" was the fourth. The movie's prologue is missing in the novelization. Bloch claimed that no one told him the anthology had a wraparound sequence. Bloch also said that in the six weeks he was given to write the book, he only saw a screening of two of the segments; he had to hurriedly change the ending of "Time Out" after the helicopter accident that occurred during filming. As originally written, "Time Out" would have ended as it did in the original screenplay where Bill finds redemption by saving two Vietnamese children whose village is being destroyed by the Air Cavalry. The finished book reflects how the first segment ends in the final cut of the film.

== Soundtrack ==
Jerry Goldsmith, who scored several episodes of the original series, composed the music for the movie and re-recorded Marius Constant's series theme. The original soundtrack album was released by Warner Bros. Records.

No.	Title	Writer(s)	Vocals	Length
1.	"Twilight Zone Main Title"			0:42
2.	"Overture"			5:13
3.	"Time Out"			6:45
4.	"Kick the Can"			10:12
5.	"Nights Are Forever"	Goldsmith	Jennifer Warnes	3:39
6.	"It's a Good Life"			10:52
7.	"Nightmare at 20,000 Feet"			6:53
8.	"Twilight Zone End Title"			0:45
Total length:				45:01

"Time Out" is the only segment whose music is not included in the overture (actually the film's end title music).

A complete recording of the dramatic score, including a previously unreleased song by Joseph Williams, was released in April 2009 by Film Score Monthly, representing the soundtrack's first American release on Compact Disc. Both songs were used in Segment 1 and were produced by Bruce Botnick with James Newton Howard (Howard also arranged "Nights Are Forever"). The promotional song from this movie, "Nights Are Forever", written by Jerry Goldsmith with lyricist John Bettis and sung by Jennifer Warnes, is heard briefly during the jukebox scene in the opening segment with Vic Morrow.

No.	Title	Music	Length
1.	"Twilight Zone Main Title"	Marius Constant	0:45
2.	"Time Out – Time Change/Questions/The Ledge"		4:51
3.	"The K.K.K./Yellow Star"		3:53
4.	"Kick the Can – Harp and Love"		1:27
5.	"Weekend Visit"		1:34
6.	"Kick the Can"		0:37
7.	"Night Games"		1:53
8.	"Young Again/Take Me With You/A New Guest"		10:10
9.	"It's a Good Life – I Remember/The House"		2:29
10.	"The Picture/The Sister/I Didn't Do It"		1:20
11.	"Cartoon Monster"		3:06
12.	"That's All, Ethel"		1:47
13.	"Teach Me/No More Tricks"		3:54
14.	"Nightmare at 20,000 Feet – Cabin Fever/Nervous Pills"		2:39
15.	"On the Wing"		1:20
16.	"A Face in the Window"		2:10
17.	"Hungry Monster/Engine Failure"		1:35
18.	"Overture (Twilight Zone Theme and End Title)"		5:55
19.	"Nights Are Forever" (Jennifer Warnes)		3:36
20.	"Anesthesia" (music and lyrics by Joseph Williams and Paul Gordon, performed by Joseph Williams)		3:02
21.	"Time Change/Questions/The Ledge" ("Time Out": album edit)		3:01
22.	"Young Again/Take Me with You/A New Guest" ("Kick the Can": alternate segments)		5:01
23.	"Cartoon Monster/That's All Ethel" ("It's a Good Life": album edit)		4:29
24.	"Cartoon Music" ("It's a Good Life")		1:26
25.	"On the Wing/A Face in the Window/Hungry Monster/Twilight Zone Theme" ("Nightmare at 20,000 Feet": album edit)		4:59
Total length:			1:16:59

The full orchestra score of the film was released by Neumation Music in 2022.

The film opens with the song "Midnight Special" by Creedence Clearwater Revival being played on the cassette tape in the driver (Albert Brooks)'s car as he and the passenger (Dan Aykroyd) sing along.

== Bibliography ==
- Vallan, Giulia D'Agnolo (March 4, 2008). John Landis (Illustrated ed.). M Press. ISBN 9781595820419.
