= The Thing Called Love =

- Theatrical release poster
- Directed by: Peter Bogdanovich
- Written by: Carol Heikkinen
- Produced by: John Davis; George Folsey Jr.
- Starring: River Phoenix; Samantha Mathis; Dermot Mulroney; Sandra Bullock
- Cinematography: Peter James
- Edited by: Terry Stokes
- Music by: G. Marq Roswell
- Distributed by: Paramount Pictures
- Release date: August 27, 1993 (United States)
- Running time: 116 minutes 120 minutes (Director's cut)
- Country: United States
- Language: English
- Budget: $14 million
- Box office: $1 million

The Thing Called Love is a 1993 American romantic comedy drama film directed by Peter Bogdanovich and written by Carol Heikkinen. Starring River Phoenix, Samantha Mathis, Dermot Mulroney, and Sandra Bullock, the film follows Miranda Presley (Mathis), an aspiring country musician who moves from New York City to Nashville and becomes embroiled in a love triangle between fellow musicians James Wright (Phoenix) and Kyle Davidson (Mulroney).

Principal photography began in Memphis, Nashville, and Santa Clarita on November 2, 1992, and concluded on February 6, 1993. The film was Phoenix's final complete screen performance before his death, as well as the final film released during his lifetime.

The Thing Called Love was theatrically released in the United States on August 27, 1993, to mixed reviews from critics and was a box office failure, grossing $1 million against its $14 million production budget.

== Plot ==
Miranda Presley is an aspiring singer/songwriter from New York City who loves country music and decides to take her chances in Nashville, Tennessee, where she hopes to become a star. Arriving after a long bus ride, Miranda makes her way to the Bluebird Café, a local bar with a reputation as a showcase for new talent. Although she arrives too late to audition for that week's roster, the bar's owner Lucy likes the plucky newcomer and gives her a job as a waitress.

By the café's second week of auditions, Miranda has become familiar with some other Nashville transplants who are looking to land a gig or sell a song. This includes sweet and open-hearted Kyle Davidson of Connecticut, moody but talented James Wright from Texas, and spunky Linda Lue Linden of Alabama. Linda Lue talks Miranda into sharing her motel room, which her mother is subsidizing. As the four friends struggle to find their place in the competitive Nashville music scene, both Kyle and James display a romantic interest in Miranda, but she is drawn to James in spite of his moody temperament.

James convinces Miranda to spend time together, partially under the pretense of writing music. They have a date ending with a kiss, but he does not follow through with a telephone call the next day. Days later they coincide in a recording studio, and he practically ignores her.

Convincing Kyle that a song he wrote is good enough to be sung by an established singer, Miranda helps him sneak the tape into a singer's car's tapedeck. Unfortunately, the police notice and apprehend them. The singer follows them, listening to the tape on the way. Enamored, she chooses not to press charges and tells Kyle she would like the song.

Out dancing on a double date with Kyle and Linda Lue and her boyfriend, Miranda line dances. James is called to perform his music, and for his second song, he asks her to help him sing it. Singing together, their chemistry is palpable. Kyle is visibly upset when Miranda tells him she is leaving with James.

They have a whirlwind romance. Miranda moves in with James, and in a few short days they take an impromptu road trip to Graceland. In a convenience store, he obtains a toy ring from a candy dispenser, and he proposes marriage. One of the clerks gets her brother to officiate a brief ceremony, and they return to Nashville married.

At the café that evening, James and Kyle come to blows over Miranda. The subsequent months, the newlyweds soon realize marriage takes work. They rarely see each other because of her odd sleeping hours and his isolating himself in his practice room.

James leaves Miranda behind to make his album for some months in Texas, what he always wanted to do. He realizes he left his heart with her, so he comes back to the Bluebird Café, seeking Miranda, but he learns that she has left for New York City.

Miranda returns and sings a new song which finally earns her a spot performing in the Bluebird, before tentatively reuniting with James. Kyle joins them as Linda Lue leaves for New York to try acting, and the remaining three discuss writing a song together.

== Cast ==
- River Phoenix as James Wright
- Samantha Mathis as Miranda Presley
- Dermot Mulroney as Kyle Davidson
- Sandra Bullock as Linda Lue Linden
- K. T. Oslin as Lucy
- Anthony Clark as Billy
- Webb Wilder as Ned
- Deborah Allen as herself
- Jo-El Sonnier as himself
- Pam Tillis as herself
- Vern Monnett as himself
- Kevin Welch as himself
- Trisha Yearwood as herself
- Jimmie Dale Gilmore as himself
- James Intveld as backing singer
- Dale Watson as himself

== Production ==
The film was to have been directed by Brian Gibson but in September 1992 he left the project to make What's Love Got to Do with It and was replaced by Peter Bogdanovich.

Bogdanovich says Phoenix approached Paramount to appear in the film. "He was brilliant to work with," said the director. "There were maybe two days during the 60-day shoot that I felt he wasn't as together as he was on other days. But one day, it was freezing cold and the other day, he took some kind of cold medicine that didn't agree with him. That was what I was told. But all the rest of the time, he was great... He was concerned with more than his own role. He was concerned with the overall picture, with the other actors and characters... He would have made a very good director.""

The film focuses on the songwriters rather than the performers. "It's a different kind of crowd," said Bogdanovich. "More cerebral, less about the glitz." It features cameos from Trisha Yearwood, Pam Tillis and Kevin Welch. Bogdanovich admitted the film had some similarities to Fame and Flashdance movies that became "kind of a genre of its own... We tried to play by the rules of that. [But] we also tried to play against that -- we tried to make it different from that kind of movie. We tried to walk a sometimes difficult tightrope."

== Soundtrack ==
The Thing Called Love

Soundtrack album by various artists
- Released: 1993
- Genre: Country
- Length: 44:04
- Label: Giant
- Producers: Garth Fundis (track 3); Lynn Peterzell (tracks 8, 11); James Stroud (tracks 1, 2, 4, 5, 8); J. Steven Soles (track 6); Rodney Crowell (tracks 7, 12); Howie Epstein (track 9); Kevin Welch (track 9); Steve Tyrell (track 10); Kyle Lehning (track 10); Deborah Allen (track 11)

The film's soundtrack features twelve songs, all done by various country artists.

River Phoenix wrote two songs including "Lone Star State of Mine"; Dermot Mulroney wrote one, and Sandra Bullock wrote lyrics for the song she performed. However, "Lone Star State of Mine" was not included on the soundtrack album for the film. In an August 1993 issue, journalist Malissa Thompson from Seventeen described Phoenix's singing as sounding amazingly urgent and sweet, although underscored with anger.

=== Track listing ===
No.	Title	Writer(s)	Artist	Length
1.	"Dreaming with My Eyes Open"	Tony Arata	Clay Walker	3:30
2.	"You'd Be Home by Now"	Don Henry	Daron Norwood	3:21
3.	"I Can't Understand"	Hank DeVito	Trisha Yearwood	3:40
4.	"I Don't Remember Your Name (But I Remember You)"	Oslin	K.T. Oslin	4:19
5.	"Diamonds and Tears"	Gary Harrison, Berg	Matraca Berg	3:33
6.	"Ready and Waiting"	Don Schlitz	Deborah Allen	3:53
7.	"Until Now"	Crowell	Rodney Crowell	4:36
8.	"Looking for a Thing Called Love"	Troy Seals, Robbins	Dennis Robbins	2:56
9.	"Streets of Love"	Welch	Kevin Welch	3:53
10.	"Partners in Wine"	Steve Tyrell, David Palmer	Randy Travis	4:04
11.	"Blame It on Your Heart"	Harlan Howard, Kostas	Allen	3:02
12.	"Standing on a Rock"	Crowell	Crowell	3:17
Total length:				32:49

== Reception ==
=== Critical response ===
On the review aggregator website Rotten Tomatoes, 62% of 21 critics' reviews are positive. The website's consensus reads: "The last film River Phoenix completed before his death, The Thing Called Love doesn't have much new to say about show business, but it's energetic and well-acted." Metacritic, which uses a weighted average, assigned the film a score of 46 out of 100, based on 19 critics, indicating "mixed or average" reviews.

Todd McCarthy of Variety magazine wrote: "Perhaps there's not much new to say about the dues and disappointments involved in breaking into the country music scene, but the scenes are fresh and the emotions real in Peter Bogdanovich's tune-laden, mixed-mood drama."

Roger Ebert of the Chicago Sun-Times gave it 1 out of 4 and wrote: "Perhaps no one could have saved Phoenix, who was not lucky enough to find a higher bottom than death. But this performance in this movie should have been seen by someone as a cry for help."

Filmink called it "a film that should work... But it doesn’t. This feels like one where he [Bogdanovich] really could have used Polly Platt."

=== Box office ===
The film debuted in several Southern markets. It was expected to open wider in autumn, but Paramount decided against this following the death of River Phoenix. The movie ultimately ranked among the least profitable films of 1993. "Paramount did do some releases in Seattle and a few other places," said Bogdanovich in 1994. "But I think they were afraid of being accused of exploiting River's death. There was a kind of general worry about that. I guess that is the thinking that prevailed. It's pretty disappointing, but you know, I've learned to go on."

The director felt the death of Phoenix affected watching the movie. "It was a totally different movie before. It had a hopeful quality and now it doesn't. The ending is ambiguous, but because River died, it becomes very sad. The last thing you're left with is that he is dead, even though the character is alive ... (The movie) was supposed to be bittersweet, but it turned out being more bitter than sweet."
