= Jenny Simpson (album) =

Studio album by Jenny Simpson
- Released: November 3, 1998
- Studio: Sound Emporium (Nashville, TN)
- Genre: Country
- Length: 40:02
- Label: Mercury Nashville
- Producer: Garth Fundis; Ray Methvin

Singles from Jenny Simspon
- 1. "Ticket Out of Kansas" Released: October 5, 1998

Jenny Simpson is the only studio album by American country music singer Jenny Simpson. It was released on November 3, 1998, via Mercury Nashville.

== Content ==
It includes the single "Ticket Out of Kansas", Simpson's only chart entry, which was previously recorded by Regina Regina on their debut album. Also included is "Grow Young with You", a duet with Michael Peterson. This song was later recorded by Andy Griggs and Coley McCabe for the soundtrack to the 2000 film Where the Heart Is.

== Critical reception ==
Jana Pendragon of Allmusic gave the album two stars out of five, writing that Simpson "sounds like a million other young women trying to break into pop-country music." Jeffrey B. Remz of Country Standard Time said that Simpson's voice was "pleasant enough", but thought that the album's sound lacked variety.

== Track listing ==
Jenny Simpson track listing
No.	Title	Writer(s)	Length
1.	"Ticket Out of Kansas"	Tia Sillers	3:27
2.	"Even When You're Not There (Get a Life)"	Ray Methvin; Pound Lamb	3:34
3.	"A Million Miles Away"	Jess Leary; Verlon Thompson	3:04
4.	"Little Miracles"	Troy Verges; Mark D. Sanders	2:57
5.	"You"	Michael Lunn; Jeff Pennig	4:58
6.	"Foolish as That May Be"	Kieran Kane	4:33
7.	"Under the Rainbow"	Methvin; James Nihan	3:20
8.	"Grow Young With You" (duet with Michael Peterson)	Austin Cunningham; Hillary Lindsey	3:53
9.	"One Word"	Don Schlitz; Angela Kaset	3:53
10.	"So I Kissed Him"	Jenny Simpson; Methvin	2:54
11.	"Til Then"	Simpson; Methvin	2:54
Total length:			40:02

== Personnel ==
Compiled from liner notes.

- Eddie Bayers — drums (tracks 1–3)
- J. T. Corenflos — electric guitar (track 10)
- Dan Dugmore — lap steel guitar (tracks 8, 10), pedal steel guitar (tracks 6, 11)
- Stuart Duncan — fiddle (tracks 3), mandolin (tracks 7, 8)
- Thom Flora — background vocals (tracks 2, 4, 6, 11)
- Larry Franklin — fiddle (tracks 4, 6)
- Paul Franklin — lap steel guitar (track 1), pedal steel guitar (tracks 2–4, 7, 9)
- Garth Fundis — background vocals (track 1)
- John Gardner — drums (track 11)
- Lisa Gregg — background vocals (track 3)
- Aubrey Haynie — fiddle (tracks 9, 11)
- Brent Mason — electric guitar (tracks 1–9)
- Ray Methvin — acoustic guitar (track 10), background vocals (track 3)
- Greg Morrow — drums (tracks 4–10), percussion (track 5, 8, 10)
- Steve Nathan — electric piano (track 1), piano (tracks 2, 3), organ (tracks 2, 5), keyboards (track 3)
- Dave Pomeroy — bass guitar
- Tom Roady — tambourine (tracks 1, 2), chimes (track 3)
- Matt Rollings — electric piano (track 10), piano (tracks 4, 6–9, 11), organ (track 6)
- Sunny Russ — background vocals (tracks 1, 2, 4, 6, 10)
- Darrell Scott — acoustic guitar (tracks 1–9), mandolin (track 1)
- Jenny Simpson — lead vocals, background vocals (tracks 2, 5)
- Biff Watson — acoustic guitar (tracks 1, 10, 11)
- Andrea Zonn — background vocals (track 3)

String arrangements on tracks 5 and 7 by Kris Wilkinson.
