= John Bettis =

American lyricist (born 1946)

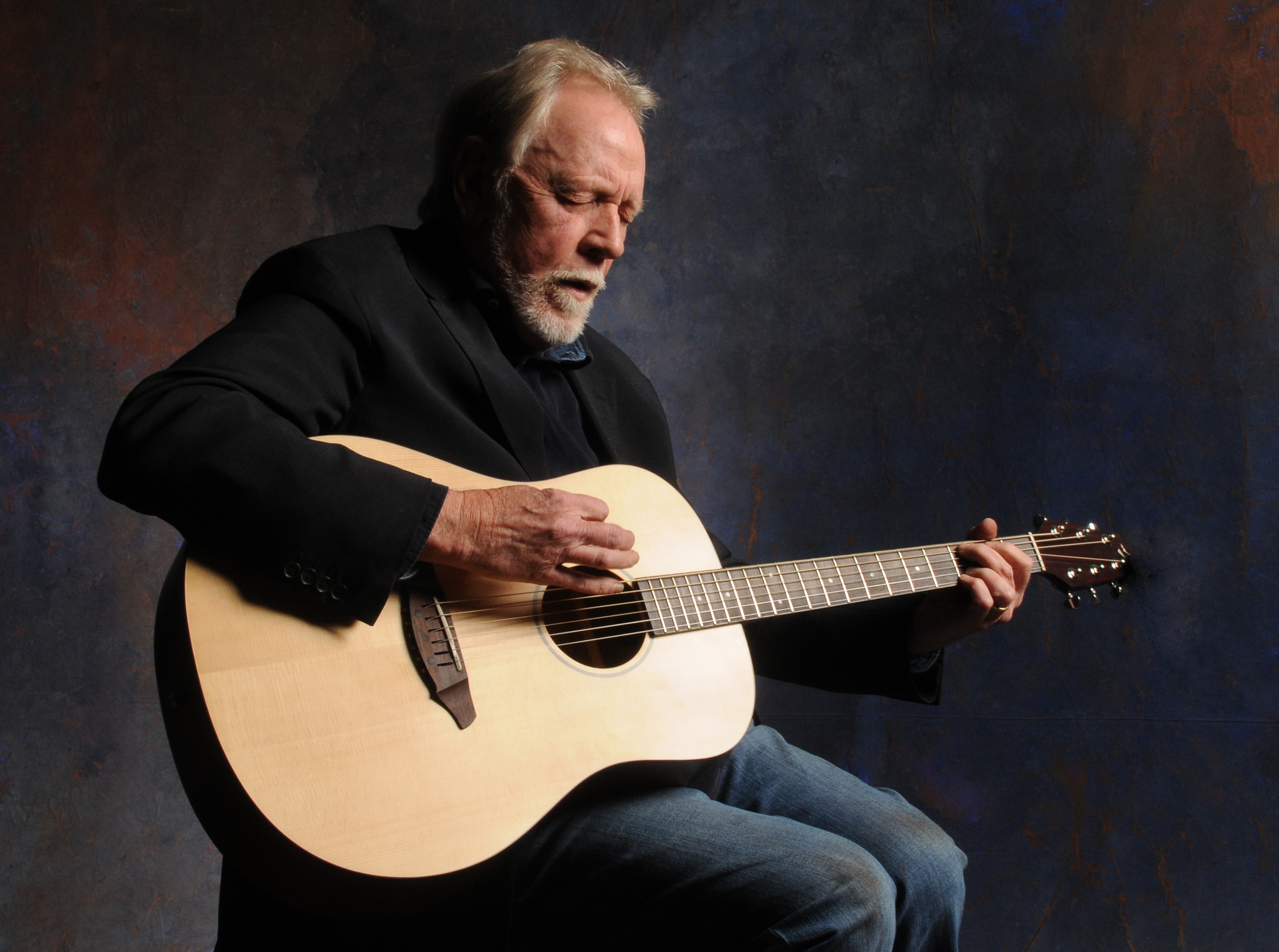
- Bettis performing at McGuire Studios Nashville in 2013

Background information
- Born: John Gregory Bettis; October 24, 1946 (age 80); Long Beach, California, US
- Origin: San Pedro, California, U.S.
- Genres: Pop; rock; rhythm and blues; adult contemporary; country
- Occupations: Songwriter, composer
- Years active: 1967−present

John Gregory Bettis (born October 24, 1946) is an American lyricist and songwriter whose songs have sold more than 250 million records worldwide, recorded by some of the most prominent artists of the late twentieth century. His work crosses many musical genres. He is best known for his long-running collaboration with Richard Carpenter of The Carpenters, co-writing hits such as “Top of the World,” “Yesterday Once More,” “Only Yesterday,” and “Goodbye to Love.” Bettis also wrote chart-topping songs for artists including Michael Jackson (“Human Nature”), Whitney Houston (“One Moment in Time”), Madonna (“Crazy for You”), the Pointer Sisters (“Slow Hand”), and George Strait (“Heartland”).

Over his career, Bettis has earned two Emmy Awards, and nominations for an Academy Award, a Golden Globe, and multiple Grammy Awards. His songs have appeared on the soundtracks of major motion pictures, and he co-wrote theme songs for television series such as Growing Pains, Empty Nest, and My Sister Sam. In 2011, he was inducted into both the Songwriters Hall of Fame and the Nashville Songwriters Hall of Fame. The list of songs with Bettis' lyrics numbers over 1000.

== Early life ==
John Bettis was born in Long Beach, California, the son of Wayne Douglas and Nellie Jane (House) Bettis. While he grew up in Southern California, his family's roots are in Missouri's Ozark Mountains. Bettis was introduced to country music at a very early age. Bettis began singing and playing trumpet when he was eight. In high school, he took up the guitar, was a member of the choir, and was active in theater. He attended San Pedro High School and graduated in 1964. At age 16, he auditioned and landed the lead role in a high-school production of Carousel where he first discovered the craft of songwriting. Shortly after, Bettis and his understudy formed a folk duo and began performing and touring on the folk circuit, opening for acts like Hoyt Axton, Ian & Sylvia and the Dillards.

After graduation, Bettis attended Long Beach State College where he began writing songs for his college choir (conducted by Frank Pooler). There he met fellow student Richard Carpenter and his sister Karen. Carpenter said to him, "Look, I've got a sister who sings great and plays drums... we'll get some other people from the music department here and make a band." The three of them formed a band called Spectrum in 1966. In order to make money for equipment, Bettis and Richard Carpenter formed a duo with Bettis on banjo and Carpenter on piano in 1967, playing turn-of-the-century tunes at Coke Corner on Disneyland's Main Street U.S.A. They were fired by Disney because they would not follow the rules; they were not playing oldies, but rather new music and Beatles songs.

== Nashville ==
Early in his career, Bettis came to Nashville, where he honed his songwriting skills. He stayed a month at the King of the Road hotel, and took a taxi every day to Music Row; he walked the streets and hung out at Quadrafonic studios and Combine Music where he met other songwriters. He said, "I learned discipline, I learned to rewrite, I learned what a good idea was, what a great idea was, and I learned what producers wanted." He spent time writing with Michael Clark, and together they wrote "Slow Hand". In 1978, he paired with co-writer R. C. Bannon to create "Only One Love in My Life", a number one hit for Ronnie Milsap. It was in Nashville in the 1970s when he attended a concert by The Carpenters. He went backstage to re-unite with his old school friends. Visiting on the Carpenter's Lear Jet, he and Richard Carpenter came up with the idea for "Top of the World." This re-kindled what become an enduring working relationship with The Carpenters. "Top of the World" was later picked up by Lynn Anderson who released it as the title song on her album Top of the World, thus giving Bettis one of early hits in country music. Anderson's version became a hit in 1973. Richard Carpenter took notice and released Karen's version that same year. During this time, Bettis was dividing his time between Nashville and Los Angeles.

== The Carpenters ==
In 1969, Richard and Karen Carpenter signed a contract with A&M Records. Their debut album Offering had eight songs co-written by Bettis but was not a commercial success. At the request of label owner Herb Alpert, the team recorded "Close to You", a Bacharach/David composition, in 1970 which became the Carpenters first hit. Other Bettis/Carpenter songs, "Goodbye to Love" and "Yesterday Once More" found similar success in 1972 and 1973. Observing the success of Lynn Anderson's recording of "Top of the World" prompted the Carpenters to release their own version as a single in that same year. The Carpenters' version eclipsed Anderson's and peaked at No. 1 for two weeks on the Billboard Hot 100 chart in December 1973.

While the Carpenters rose to fame with Bettis' lyrics in hits like "Only Yesterday", "I Need to Be in Love" and their own version of "Top of the World", Bettis continued his successes in Nashville, writing lyrics for Barbara Mandrell's "One of a Kind Pair of Fools" that reached number one on the country chart.

== Michael Jackson ==
Bettis gained perhaps his biggest achievement with "Human Nature", a ballad written for Michael Jackson's multi-platinum album Thriller. In the early 1980s, every songwriter in Los Angeles, including Bettis, dreamed of having a song recorded by Michael Jackson. Bettis said at the time (1983) he didn't think he had anything suited for Jackson. But Bettis had previously worked with Quincy Jones, Jackson's producer. He said, "Through my publisher, Quincy got my number and he called me. He didn’t normally do that, I mean, it’s not like he never called me, but I knew he was working on this record so why would he be calling… me?" On the phone, Jones said, "We've got this tune, and it really needs your touch". He had a piece of music with no lyric and wanted Bettis to hear it. Shortly thereafter, a man on a motorcycle arrived at Bettis' house carrying a pouch. It contained a cassette which he hand-delivered. "The melody was kind of jumping out of the speakers at me," said Bettis, "so I sat down in my den where I normally didn’t write, and I started jotting lyrics." When Bettis wrote the line "If this town is just an apple, let me take a bite", he knew something good was coming. After three hours he had finished the lyrics; he typed the words and took them to his publisher's house. He was later told that Michael Jackson would be recording the still unpolished song very soon.

The song, "Human Nature" was born as a short melody composed by Toto's Steve Porcaro. Bettis and Porcaro quickly joined up for a two day work session to polish the song. During this time the two writers found they had different visions of what the song was about; Porcaro eventually acquiesced to Bettis' lyric. "It was around 1 or 1:30 p.m.", Bettis said, "and we had to be at the studio by 4. Quincy immediately approved of the lyrics""

Thriller became the best selling record of all time, and "Human Nature" has since been recorded by many artists, including Boyz II Men, Miles Davis, John Mayer, George Howard, Christine Collister, and David Benoit. It has also been sampled by SWV, Ne-Yo, 2Pac, Lil Wayne, Nas, Jason Nevins and Chris Brown.

== The Pointer Sisters ==
In 1981, the Pointer Sisters recording of "Slow Hand", by Bettis and Michael Clark, charted for 24 weeks on the Billboard Hot 100 and peaked at number two; it was number seven on the R&B chart. The following year the song, recorded by Conway Twitty, crossed over to become number one on the Billboard Hot Country Singles. Clark and Bettis also teamed up to write Juice Newton's "Heart of the Night" and Donna Summer's "The Woman in Me".

== Music awards ==
John Bettis has received recognition across the music, film, and television industries:

- Academy Award nomination:
  - Best Original Song, "Promise Me You'll Remember" from The Godfather Part III – 63rd Academy Awards, 1991
- Golden Globe Award: Golden Globes (1991): nominated for Best Original Song— did not win
- Emmy Awards (2 wins):
  - “One Moment in Time” (1988 Summer Olympics theme) Won, 1988
  - “Where There Is Hope” (Guiding Light) Daytime Emmy. Won, 2001
- Emmy nominations for:
  - “Swept Away” 1988
  - “As Long As We Got Each Other” (Growing Pains) 1986
- Grammy Award nominations:
  - Best R&B Song: “Can You Stop the Rain” (Peabo Bryson) 1992
  - Best Song Written for Visual Media: “One Moment in Time” 1989
- Nashville Songwriters Association International (NSAI):
  - Song of the Year and Music City Song of the Year nominations

== Film ==
In 1985, Bettis accepted an assignment in Hollywood to write a song for the soundtrack of the film Vision Quest. The end result was "Crazy for You", a song not originally written for, but recorded by Madonna, who also performs it in the film. The song was an international hit, and led to the film being re-titled Crazy for You when it was released in the UK and Australia.

Perhaps Bettis' best-known commissioned work is "As Long as We Got Each Other", co-written with long-time collaborator Steve Dorff as the theme song to the hit ABC Network television sitcom Growing Pains, sung by five-time Grammy winner B. J. Thomas for six seasons, solo for season 1; and, as a duet with Jennifer Warnes for seasons 2, 3, 5, and 7; and with Dusty Springfield for season 4.

In 1988, he co-wrote "One Moment in Time" with Albert Hammond which was recorded by Whitney Houston as the theme for the Summer Olympics. When Houston sang it at the Grammy awards broadcast, she received a standing ovation.

John Bettis continued developing an eclectic catalog into the 1990s. 1991's "Can You Stop the Rain" topped the R&B charts in 1991 for Peabo Bryson. "If You Go Away" was a top 20 hit in 1992 for New Kids on the Block, and "Heartland", from the soundtrack to the film Pure Country, was a number one hit for George Strait.

Songs by with Bettis' lyrics featured in motion pictures include some of the following. For a broader selection see list of Films with song lyrics written by John Bettis

- Back to the Beach - "Some Things Live Forever" by Frankie Avalon and Annette Funicello
- Cocktail - "Wild Again" by Starship
- Curly Sue - "You Never Know" by Ringo Starr
- The Godfather Part III - "Promise Me You'll Remember" by Harry Connick, Jr.
- The Last Boy Scout - "Friday Night's a Great Night for Football" by Bill Medley
- Listen to Me - "Who's Gonna Love You Tonight" by David Foster
- National Lampoon's European Vacation - "New Looks" by Dr. John
- Nothing in Common - "Loving Strangers" by Christopher Cross
- Pure Country - "Heartland" by George Strait
- Star Trek V: The Final Frontier - "The Moon's a Window to Heaven" by Hiroshima
- Twilight Zone: The Movie - "Nights Are Forever" by Jennifer Warnes
- Vision Quest - "Crazy for You" by Madonna

== Television ==
Here are a few examples of lyrics written by Bettis for songs on television. For a broader selection see list of television songs for with lyrics by John Bettis:

- Annabelle's Wish - "The World From Way Up Here", "Friends Like Us", "Tiny Dreamer Music Box Theme", "If You Believe", "There's No Place Like Home", "The World From Way Up Here Reprise" by Randy Travis, Alison Krauss, Beth Neilsen Chapman, Cloris Leachman
- Empty Nest - "Life Goes On" by Billy Vera
- Growing Pains - "As Long as We Got Each Other" by B. J. Thomas, Jennifer Warnes, Dusty Springfield, Kim Carnes, "Swept Away" by Christopher Cross
- Guiding Light - "Where There is Hope"
- Major Dad
- Murphy Brown - "Like the Whole World's Watching" by Take 6
- Nurses - "Here I Am"
- Summer Olympics '88 - "One Moment in Time" by Whitney Houston

== Theater ==
John Bettis has contributed lyrics to several stage musicals. His theater credits include:

- Svengali (1992)
- Lunch (national tour, 1994)
- The Last Session (1998), which earned the L. A. Drama Critics Circle Award for Best Musical Score
- Say Goodnight (1999)
- Pure Country (2008), adapted from the 1992 film of the same name
- Josephine (2011), a musical biography of Josephine Baker

In 2011, Bettis was inducted into both the Songwriters Hall of Fame as well as the Nashville Songwriters Hall of Fame.

== Personal life ==
As of 2014, Bettis lived in New York and Santa Monica, and has a farm near Nashville. They have two sons, Wyatt and Conway.

== Songs ==
- List of songs by John Bettis
