= Promise Me You'll Remember (Love Theme from The Godfather Part III) =

"Promise Me You'll Remember (Single Version)"

Single by Harry Connick Jr.

from the album The Godfather Part III
- B-side: "Promise Me You'll Remember"
- Released: 1991
- Genre: Traditional pop
- Length: 5:11
- Label: Sony; Columbia Records
- Songwriters: Carmine Coppola; John Bettis

"Promise Me You'll Remember (Love Theme from The Godfather Part III)" is a song written for The Godfather Part III (1990), the third and final film in The Godfather trilogy.

== Overview ==
"Promise Me You'll Remember" is the vocal version of the love theme. The music is written by Carmine Coppola, the lyrics by John Bettis. The song is sung by Harry Connick Jr. It is track #12 on The Godfather Part III soundtrack.

Harry Connick Jr. sang "Promise Me You'll Remember" on the Academy Awards telecast in 1991.

== Awards and nominations ==
The song was nominated for the Academy Award and the Golden Globe Award for Best Song.

== See also ==
- "Love Theme from The Godfather"
