= Jennie Simpson (camogie) =

Irish camogie player

Personal information
- Born: Waterford, Ireland

Sport
- Sport: Camogie
- Position: Full back
Club
- Years: Club
- St Anne's Dunhill
Club titles
- Munster titles: Munster
Inter-county
- Years: County
- Waterford

Jennifer Simpson is a former camogie player with Waterford who won Camogie All Star "Soaring Star" awards in 2010 and 2011 and an All-Ireland Junior Camogie Championship medal in 2011.

She was a member of the Munster team that won the 2011 Gael Linn (Junior Interprovincial) Cup final.
