= Observer–Reporter =

Daily newspaper in Pennsylvania

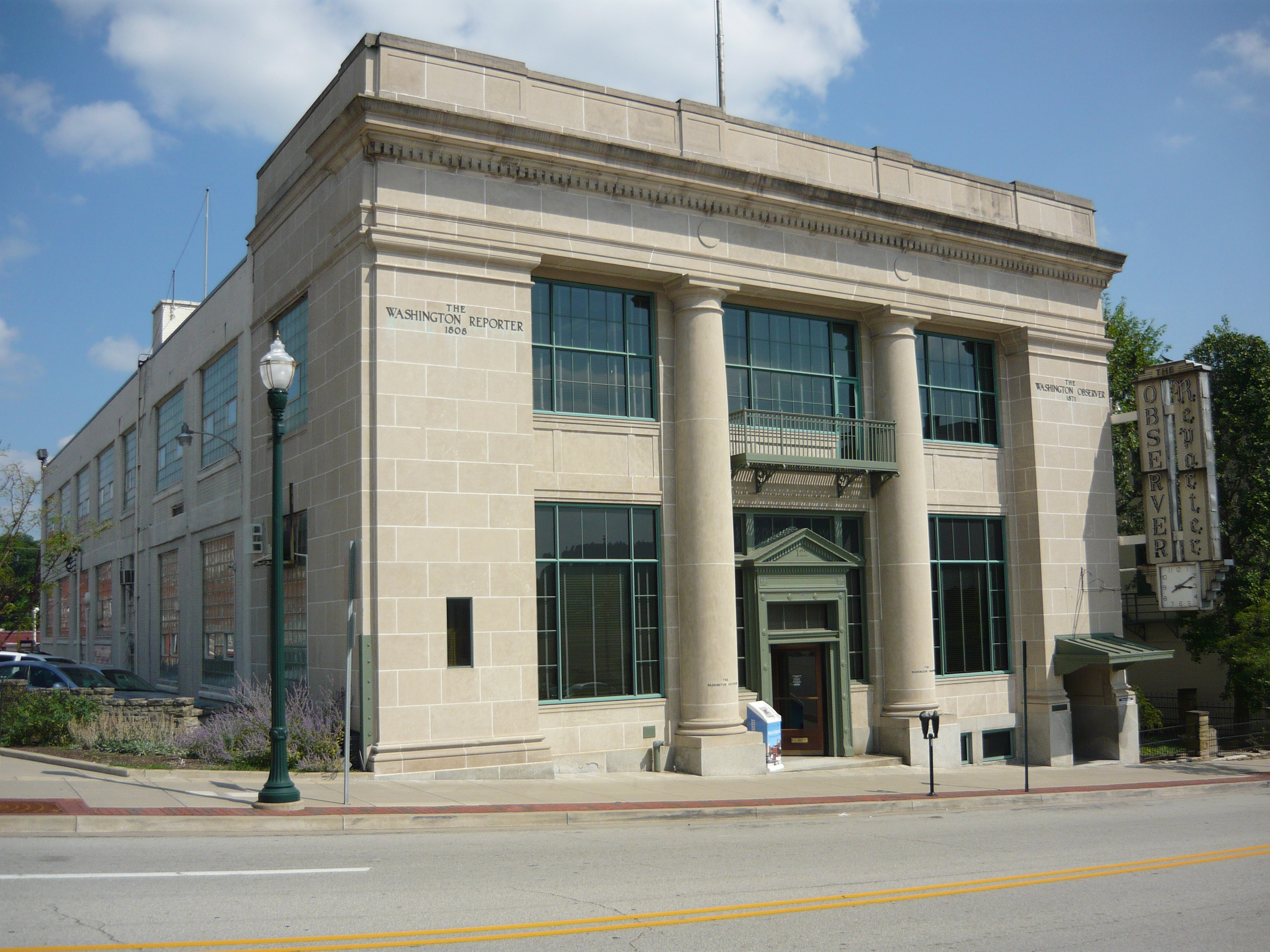
- Observer–Reporter Building
- Type: Daily newspaper
- Owner: Ogden Newspapers
- Founder(s): John L. Stewart and E.F. Acheson
- Publisher: Robert Pinarski
- Editor: Liz Rogers
- Founded: July 24, 1902,
- Headquarters: Washington, Pennsylvania
- Circulation: 31,035 weekly; 33,911 Weekend
- ISSN: 0891-0693
- OCLC number: 2265357
- Website: observer-reporter.com

The Observer–Reporter is a daily newspaper covering Washington County, Greene County, and the Mon Valley in Pennsylvania, with some overlap into the South Hills of Pittsburgh. The newspaper was published by the Observer Publishing Company in the city of Washington, Pennsylvania.

== History ==
The Observer Publishing Co. was formed on July 24, 1902, by John L. Stewart and E.F. Acheson. Stewart's grandsons, John L.S. Northrop and William B. Northrop, owned and ran the company until their retirements in June 2002, when ownership was transferred to the fourth generation, which included the children of John and William. Thomas Northrop served as publisher and president from 2002 until 2018. The paper has had a long involvement and investment in the local community.

Ownership was transferred to Ogden Newspapers in 2018.
