= Jenny Simpson (singer) =

American country music singer (born 1973)

- Born: June 6, 1973 (51 years)
- Origin: Nashville, Tennessee
- Genres: Country
- Occupation: Singer
- Years active: 1998
- Labels: Mercury Nashville

Jenny Simpson (born on June 6, 1973 in Nashville, Tennessee) is an American country music singer. She was signed to Mercury Nashville and released her self-titled debut album in 1998.

Simpson's only single, "Ticket Out of Kansas", peaked at number 54 on the Billboard Hot Country Singles & Tracks chart. It received a favorable review from Deborah Evans Price of Billboard, who said that "Simpson's nuanced vocal performance makes listeners feel as if they are boarding the bus with her."

== Discography ==
=== Albums ===
Title	Album details
Jenny Simpson	Release date: November 3, 1998; Label: Mercury Nashville

=== Singles ===
Year	Single	Peak positions	Album
Year	Single	US Country	Album
1998	"Ticket Out of Kansas"	54	Jenny Simpson

=== Music videos ===
Year	Video	Director
1998	"Ticket Out of Kansas"	Adolfo Doring
