= Robert Ellis Orrall =

American singer-songwriter

- Also known as: Bob Something
- Born: May 4, 1955 (age 71)
- Origin: Winthrop, Massachusetts, U.S.
- Genres: Rock; indie rock; country; pop
- Occupations: Singer; songwriter; record producer
- Instruments: Vocals; keyboards; guitar
- Years active: 1980–present
- Labels: RCA; Infinity Cat (solo); Giant (in Orrall & Wright); Sony; Plastic350
- Formerly of: Orrall & Wright
- Website: www.robertellisorrall.com

Robert Ellis Orrall (born May 4, 1955) is an American singer, songwriter, and record producer. Signed to RCA Records in 1980, Orrall debuted that year with the album "Fixation". His first Top 40 single was "I Couldn't Say No", a duet with Carlene Carter. By 1990, Orrall had found success as a songwriter, having penned Number One singles for Shenandoah and Clay Walker. He returned to RCA in 1991 and charted the singles "Boom! It Was Over" (#19) and "A Little Bit of Her Love" (#31), from his first country music album, Flying Colors. Orrall then joined frequent songwriting partner Curtis Wright in the CMA-nominated duo Orrall & Wright, recording one more album and charting two singles. They split up in 1994, however, and Orrall returned to his solo career, writing singles for Reba McEntire, Taylor Swift, and Lindsay Lohan, as well as producing records for Swift, Be Your Own Pet, and Love and Theft. He also performs and records as an indie rock musician in the band Monkey Bowl.

== Musical career ==
=== Beginnings ===
Born in Winthrop, Massachusetts, Orrall got his musical start playing in various Boston, Massachusetts, area clubs. He signed with RCA in 1980 as a rock artist. His three RCA albums, Fixation, Special Pain and Contain Yourself were supported by bandmates Kook Lawry on guitar, Don Walden on bass, David Stefanelli on drums and Brian Maes on keys with tours opening for U2, The Kinks, and NRBQ. Orrall's Special Pain also produced his first chart single in "I Couldn't Say No", a duet with Carlene Carter (also her first chart hit) which peaked in the Top 40 on the Billboard Hot 100. Carter, like Orrall, would eventually become a country music star in her own right.

=== Nashville ===
Orrall eventually gained an interest in country music through such acts as Steve Earle, Lyle Lovett, and Foster & Lloyd. He then moved to Nashville, Tennessee, intending to use his songwriting and record producing skills. One of his first cuts was Shenandoah's "Next to You, Next to Me", which Orrall co-wrote with Curtis Wright.

Shortly after his song topped the charts, Orrall's publisher BMG Music urged him to perform his songs at The Bluebird Cafe in Nashville. He was then offered a second record deal with RCA. Titled Flying Colors, Orrall's first and only solo country album produced three charting singles, including a Top 20 in "Boom! It Was Over", as well as "A Little Bit of Her Love" and "Every Day When I Get Home". In 1993, Clay Walker reached Number One on the country charts with Orrall's "What's It to You", another Wright co-write.

=== Orrall & Wright ===
Orrall and Wright paired up in 1994, forming a duo known as Orrall & Wright. They recorded one album for Giant Records. After charting two songs on the Billboard charts, "She Loves Me Like She Means It" and "If You Could Say What I'm Thinking", the duo was nominated for Duo of the Year by the Country Music Association. Orrall & Wright split up in 1994, and Orrall moved on to developing and producing new artists.

=== Late 1990s and 2000s ===
Orrall continued to write songs and produce records for other artists, including "What If It's You" for Reba McEntire, "Ultimate"" for Lindsay Lohan, The Swing" for James Bonamy, as well as many cuts by Michael Peterson: the Number One hit "From Here to Eternity". He also took up painting, and holds one-man shows around Nashville. He is represented by Estel Gallery.

In 2002 Orrall and his two sons, Jake and Jamin, formed an independent rock label called Infinity Cat Recordings. One of the acts signed to that label is fictitious indie rock group Monkey Bowl, in which Orrall assumes the pseudonym Bob Something. In 2004, the group achieved media attention for its song "Al Gore". Written by Orrall, the song features an appearance by former United States vice president Al Gore. Among the acts on the label are JEFF the Brotherhood, which is composed of Orrall's sons, Jamin and Jake. Although Orrall does not write for bands on the label, he has occasionally engineered or mixed their albums, most recently grunge-pop trio Daddy Issues' debut full-length Can We Still Hang.

Orrall has continued writing for other artists in the 2000s, including Martina McBride's 2010 single "Wrong Baby Wrong" and Ashton Shepherd's 2011 single "Look It Up". He also co-produced singer-songwriter Taylor Swift's self-titled debut album and her 2008 extended play Beautiful Eyes, as well as Love and Theft's 2009 album World Wide Open. Overall, he has written more than 250 songs for other artists. He contributed the title track to the Victor/SonyBMG album "The Book Of Lies", described as the "first soundtrack for a book.". In 2010, he released "Gravity", which comes packaged with a free copy of "Mistakes", his 1998 autobiographical album lauded by the Washington Post. In 2012, he released another album from Monkey Bowl, "Space," this time on Plastic 350 Records. In 2021, he released a new album, 467 Surf and Gun Club, which featured many members of his original band.

== Discography ==
=== Albums ===
- Sweet Nothing (REO)
- Big 12 Inch Single (Sail)
- Fixation (1981) (RCA)
- Special Pain (1983) (RCA)
- Contain Yourself (1984) (RCA)
- Flying Colors (1993) (RCA)
- Plastic 350 (2004) (Infinity Cat) as Monkey Bowl
- "Soon To Be A Major Motion Picture" (2005) (Infinity Cat) as Steffle/Flanders
- "Art Circus" (2006) (Infinity Cat) as Art Circus
- Ultimate (2008) (Infinity Cat) as Monkey Bowl
- The Book Of Lies (2008) (Victor/SonyBMG)
- Mistakes/Gravity" (2010) (Plastic350)
- Space (2012) (Plastic350) as Monkey Bowl
- 467 Surf and Gun Club (2021) (Fixation Records)

=== Singles ===
Year	Single	Peak chart positions			Album
Year	Single	US	US Country	CAN Country	Album
1983	"I Couldn't Say No" (with Carlene Carter)	32	—	—	Special Pain
1983	"Tell Me if It Hurts"	—	—	—	Special Pain
1984	"Alibi"	—	—	—	Contain Yourself
1992	"Boom! It Was Over"	—	19	39	Flying Colors
1993	"A Little Bit of Her Love"	—	31	36	Flying Colors
1993	"Every Day When I Get Home"	—	64	68	Flying Colors
"—" denotes releases that did not chart

=== Music videos ===
Year	Video	Director
1981	"Actually"	
1983	"I Couldn't Say No"	
1983	"Tell Me If It Hurts"	
1992	"Boom! It Was Over"	Chris Rogers
1993	"A Little Bit of Her Love"	Alan Chebot
1993	"Every Day When I Get Home"	Alan Chebot
