= 1996 in country music =

This is a list of notable events in country music that took place in the year 1996.

== Events ==
- June 28 — First annual Country Stampede Music Festival begins
- October 6 — Tim McGraw and Faith Hill are married, and quickly become country music's most visible couple. Their friendship grew into romance during their successful "Spontaneous Combustion" tour that year.

== Top hits of the year ==
=== Singles released by American artists ===
US	CAN	Single	Artist	Reference
21	18	4 to 1 in Atlanta	Tracy Byrd	
15	3	Ain't Got Nothin' on Us	John Michael Montgomery	
5	2	All I Want Is a Life	Tim McGraw	
13	15	All You Ever Do Is Bring Me Down	The Mavericks (feat. Flaco Jiménez)	
11	14	Almost a Memory Now	BlackHawk	
24	18	Are We in Trouble Now	Randy Travis	
1	1	The Beaches of Cheyenne	Garth Brooks	
1	1	Believe Me Baby (I Lied)	Trisha Yearwood	
17	8	Big Guitar	BlackHawk	
1	1	Bigger Than the Beatles	Joe Diffie	
10	1	Blue	LeAnn Rimes	
1	1	Blue Clear Sky	George Strait	
12	14	Born in the Dark	Doug Stone	
18	24	Bury the Shovel	Clay Walker	
18	21	By My Side	Lorrie Morgan & Jon Randall	
1	2	Carried Away	George Strait	
19	8	The Change	Garth Brooks	
10	30	Change My Mind	John Berry	
4	4	Cowboy Love	John Michael Montgomery	
1	3	Daddy's Money	Ricochet	
6	2	Deep Down	Pam Tillis	
2	9	Does That Blue Moon Ever Shine on You	Toby Keith	
1	8	Don't Get Me Started	Rhett Akins	
3	10	Every Light in the House	Trace Adkins	
2	2	Every Time I Get Around You	David Lee Murphy	
34	17	Every Time My Heart Calls Your Name	John Berry	
2	1	The Fear of Being Alone	Reba McEntire	
12	10	Givin' Water to a Drowning Man	Lee Roy Parnell	
6	44	Goodnight Sweetheart	David Kersh	
23	17	Grandpa Told Me So	Kenny Chesney	
1	1	Guys Do It All the Time	Mindy McCready	
2	3	Heads Carolina, Tails California	Jo Dee Messina	
21	12	Heart Half Empty	Ty Herndon featuring Stephanie Bentley	
3	3	Heart's Desire	Lee Roy Parnell	
14	5	Heaven Help My Heart	Wynonna Judd	
14	34	Heaven in My Woman's Eyes	Tracy Byrd	
12	1	High Lonesome Sound	Vince Gill	
6	20	Holdin' Onto Something	Jeff Carson	
3	4	Home	Alan Jackson	
23	8	Honky Tonkin's What I Do Best	Marty Stuart & Travis Tritt	
2	6	Hypnotize the Moon	Clay Walker	
2	3	I Am That Man	Brooks & Dunn	
4	2	I Can Still Make Cheyenne	George Strait	
2	8	I Don't Think I Will	James Bonamy	
5	8	I Know She Still Loves Me	George Strait	
3	2	I Think About You	Collin Raye	
1	5	I'll Try	Alan Jackson	
4	2	I'm Not Supposed to Love You Anymore	Bryan White	
4	4	If You Loved Me	Tracy Lawrence	
1	2	It Matters to Me	Faith Hill	
19	17	It Works	Alabama	
7	4	It Wouldn't Hurt to Have Wings	Mark Chesnutt	
15	17	It's All in Your Head	Diamond Rio	
14	21	It's Lonely Out There	Pam Tillis	
5	2	It's Midnight Cinderella	Garth Brooks	
5	11	It's What I Do	Billy Dean	
6	6	Jacob's Ladder	Mark Wills	
2	28	Learning as You Go	Rick Trevino	
1	1	Like the Rain	Clint Black	
3	1	Like There Ain't No Yesterday	BlackHawk	
1	2	Little Bitty	Alan Jackson	
1	1	Living in a Moment	Ty Herndon	
1	3	Lonely Too Long	Patty Loveless	
4	4	Long as I Live	John Michael Montgomery	
9	10	Love Is Stronger Than Pride	Ricochet	
12	20	Love Remains	Collin Raye	
4	13	The Maker Said Take Her	Alabama	
13	8	Mama Don't Get Dressed Up for Nothing	Brooks & Dunn	
2	6	Me and You	Kenny Chesney	
5	4	Meant to Be	Sammy Kershaw	
3	7	More Than You'll Ever Know	Travis Tritt	
1	1	My Maria	Brooks & Dunn	
1	1	No News	Lonestar	
3	4	Not Enough Hours in the Night	Doug Supernaw	
3	10	Not That Different	Collin Raye	
2	2	On a Good Night	Wade Hayes	
1	4	One Way Ticket (Because I Can)	LeAnn Rimes	
5	7	Only on Days That End in "Y"	Clay Walker	
13	5	Out with a Bang	David Lee Murphy	
20	14	Ready, Willing and Able	Lari White	
1	2	Rebecca Lynn	Bryan White	
18	—	Redneck 12 Days of Christmas	Jeff Foxworthy	
9	14	Ring on Her Finger, Time on Her Hands	Reba McEntire	
8	14	The River and the Highway	Pam Tillis	
5	12	The Road You Leave Behind	David Lee Murphy	
19	19	'Round Here	Sawyer Brown	
8	9	Runnin' Away with My Heart	Lonestar	
38	18	Say I	Alabama	
1	5	She Never Lets It Go to Her Heart	Tim McGraw	
17	20	She Said Yes	Rhett Akins	
26	20	She's Got a Mind of Her Own	James Bonamy	
1	1	So Much for Pretending	Bryan White	
13	13	Some Things Are Meant to Be	Linda Davis	
3	8	Someone Else's Dream	Faith Hill	
2	42	Stars over Texas	Tracy Lawrence	
19	26	Starting Over Again	Reba McEntire	
1	1	Strawberry Wine	Deana Carter	
6	13	Ten Thousand Angels	Mindy McCready	
4	3	That Girl's Been Spyin' on Me	Billy Dean	
4	3	That Ol' Wind	Garth Brooks	
18	34	That's Enough of That	Mila Mason	
4	19	That's What I Get for Lovin' You	Diamond Rio	
4	7	Then You Can Tell Me Goodbye	Neal McCoy	
20	33	There's a Girl in Texas	Trace Adkins	
13	27	A Thousand Times a Day	Patty Loveless	
1	1	Time Marches On	Tracy Lawrence	
1	3	To Be Loved by You	Wynonna Judd	
4	10	Too Much Fun	Daryle Singletary	
3	19	Treat Her Right	Sawyer Brown	
10	7	Vidalia	Sammy Kershaw	
2	2	Walkin' Away	Diamond Rio	
5	21	What Do I Know	Ricochet	
5	15	What I Meant to Say	Wade Hayes	
12	21	When a Woman Loves a Man	Lee Roy Parnell	
45	18	When Cowboys Didn't Dance	Lonestar	
1	5	Wild Angels	Martina McBride	
6	10	A Woman's Touch	Toby Keith	
5	6	Worlds Apart	Vince Gill	
25	18	Would I	Randy Travis	
37	13	Wrong Place, Wrong Time	Mark Chesnutt	
1	1	You Can Feel Bad	Patty Loveless	
6	1	You Can't Lose Me	Faith Hill	
3	13	You Gotta Love That	Neal McCoy	
7	22	You're Not in Kansas Anymore	Jo Dee Messina	

=== Singles released by Canadian artists ===
US	CAN	Single	Artist	Reference
—	18	All She Wants	Rena Gaile	
—	4	All the Way	Jason McCoy	
—	5	Ancient History	Prairie Oyster	
—	1	Anita Got Married	Duane Steele	
—	1	Candle	Jason McCoy	
—	10	Cloud of Dust	Rena Gaile	
—	1	Cornfields or Cadillacs	Farmer's Daughter	
—	1	Crank My Tractor	Michelle Wright	
—	20	A Fine Line	Lawnie Wallace	
—	10	Foolproof	Desert Dolphins	
—	18	Forty Days and Nights	The Rankin Family	
28	7	Home Ain't Where His Heart Is (Anymore)	Shania Twain	
2	1	I Do	Paul Brandt	
—	4	I Waited	Chris Cummings	
8	1	If I Were You	Terri Clark	
1	1	(If You're Not in It for Love) I'm Outta Here!	Shania Twain	
—	1	It's Lonely I Can't Stand	Charlie Major	
—	3	Keep Me Rockin'	Patricia Conroy	
—	13	Love Music Loves to Dance	Calvin Wiggett	
5	1	My Heart Has a History	Paul Brandt	
1	1	No One Needs to Know	Shania Twain	
50	1	Nobody's Girl	Michelle Wright	
—	4	One Step Back	Jamie Warren	
5	1	Poor Poor Pitiful Me	Terri Clark	
—	16	Rhythm of Your Wings	Gary Fjellgaard	
—	9	Roving Gypsy Boy	The Rankin Family	
—	14	Sittin' Pretty	Thomas Wade & Wayward	
—	18	So, So Long	Rachel Matkin	
—	2	Stuck on Your Love	Duane Steele	
34	11	Suddenly Single	Terri Clark	
—	1	Sure Enough	Chris Cummings	
—	13	Take You by the Heart	The Cruzeros	
—	1	Tell Me Something I Don't Know	Charlie Major	
—	8	Thought I Was Dreaming	Lawnie Wallace	
—	3	The Trouble with Love	Duane Steele	
—	1	Unbelievable Love	Prairie Oyster	
—	2	Waiting on You	Charlie Major	
—	12	Watching Her Sleep	Jamie Warren	
3	3	When Boy Meets Girl	Terri Clark	
—	15	Wild and Free	Joan Kennedy	
—	15	Windows to the Past	The Neilsons	
1	1	You Win My Love	Shania Twain	
—	8	Zero to Sixty	Thomas Wade & Wayward	

== Top new album releases ==
US	CAN	Album	Artist	Record label
	21	All the Good 'Uns (The Best of Ian Tyson)	Ian Tyson	Stony Plain
	10	Anne Murray	Anne Murray	SBK/Capitol
	13	The Best of Country Heat	Various Artists	BMG
17	9	The Best of Country Sing the Best of Disney	Various Artists	Walt Disney
7	3	Between Now and Forever	Bryan White	Asylum
12	18	Big Love	Tracy Byrd	MCA Nashville
	13	The Birth of a Star	Patsy Cline	Razor & Tie
1	1	Blue	LeAnn Rimes	Curb
1	3	Blue Clear Sky	George Strait	MCA Nashville
6		Blue Moon	Toby Keith	A&M
	5	Blue Plate Special	Prairie Oyster	Velvel
1	1	Borderline	Brooks & Dunn	Arista Nashville
33	12	BR5-49	BR5-49	Arista Nashville
14	1	Calm Before the Storm	Paul Brandt	Reprise
23		Christmas: The Gift	Collin Raye	Epic
18		Christmas Vol. II	Alabama	RCA Nashville
	1	CMT Canada '96	Various Artists	BMG
	1	Collection	The Rankin Family	EMI
3		Crank It Up: The Music Album	Jeff Foxworthy	Warner Bros.
2	1	Did I Shave My Legs for This?	Deana Carter	Capitol Nashville
6	16	Dreamin' Out Loud	Trace Adkins	Capitol Nashville
6	22	Everybody Knows	Trisha Yearwood	MCA Nashville
1	1	Everything I Love	Alan Jackson	Arista Nashville
9	9	Faces	John Berry	Capitol Nashville
74	6	For Me It's You	Michelle Wright	Arista Nashville
	4	Friends & Lovers	Various Artists	Sony
9	10	Full Circle	Randy Travis	Warner Bros.
12	6	Gettin' Out the Good Stuff	David Lee Murphy	MCA Nashville
10		The Gift	Kenny Rogers	Magnatone
21		Goodnight Sweetheart	David Kersh	Curb
8	9	Greater Need	Lorrie Morgan	BNA
2	5	Greatest Hits	Clint Black	RCA Nashville
18	14	Greatest Hits	Mark Chesnutt	Decca Nashville
3	5	High Lonesome Sound	Vince Gill	MCA Nashville
27	21	Honky Tonkin's What I Do Best	Marty Stuart	MCA Nashville
23		I Stoled This Record	Cledus T. Judd	Razor & Tie
18		It's What I Do	Billy Dean	Capitol Nashville
14	4	IV	Diamond Rio	Arista Nashville
22	8	Jo Dee Messina	Jo Dee Messina	Curb
10	3	Just the Same	Terri Clark	Mercury/PolyGram
17		Learning as You Go	Rick Trevino	Columbia
74	18	Lisa Brokop	Lisa Brokop	Capitol Nashville
6	18	Living in a Moment	Ty Herndon	Epic
	11	Makin' Hay	Farmer's Daughter	Universal
9		Me and You	Kenny Chesney	BNA
4	2	Measure of a Man	Kevin Sharp	Asylum
7	7	Neal McCoy	Neal McCoy	Atlantic
	3	New Country 3	Various Artists	Warner
19	11	Not Fade Away (Remembering Buddy Holly)	Various Artists	Decca Nashville
11		On a Good Night	Wade Hayes	Columbia
61	14	One Ride in Vegas	Deryl Dodd	Columbia
3	13	A Place in the World	Mary Chapin Carpenter	Columbia
17		Politics, Religion and Her	Sammy Kershaw	Mercury/PolyGram
36	13	Reflections: Songs of Love	John Denver	RCA
7	8	The Restless Kind	Travis Tritt	Warner Bros.
2	1	Revelations	Wynonna Judd	Curb/MCA Nashville
14	12	Ricochet	Ricochet	Columbia
4		The Road to Ensenada	Lyle Lovett	Curb
19		Shady Grove	Jerry Garcia & David Grisman	Acoustic Disc
72	11	Solid Ground	Ricky Skaggs	Atlantic
13		Somebody New	Rhett Akins	Decca Nashville
	21	Somewhere Inside	Chris Cummings	Warner
20	4	Spirit	Willie Nelson	Island
12	11	Stars and Stripes Vol. 1	The Beach Boys	River North
	21	Steppin' Country 2	Various Artists	Columbia
5	1	Ten Thousand Angels	Mindy McCready	BNA
3	3	Tennessee Moon	Neil Diamond	Columbia
43	20	That's Enough of That	Mila Mason	Atlantic
4	4	Time Marches On	Tracy Lawrence	Atlantic
20	14	Trail of Tears	Billy Ray Cyrus	Mercury/PolyGram
21	24	Treasures	Dolly Parton	Rising Tide
10	16	The Trouble with the Truth	Patty Loveless	Epic
	8	Untamed and True 3	Various Artists	MCA
20		Used Heart for Sale	Gary Allan	Decca Nashville
5	14	What I Do the Best	John Michael Montgomery	Atlantic
16		What I Live to Do	James Bonamy	Epic
1	3	What If It's You	Reba McEntire	MCA Nashville

=== Other top albums ===
US	CAN	Album	Artist	Record label
40		A.K.A. Wham Bam Sam	Hank Williams, Jr.	Curb
60		All Because of You	Daryle Singletary	Giant
74		Almost Alone	Chet Atkins	Columbia
53		Don't Fence Me In	Lari White	RCA Nashville
73		Elvis: Great Country Songs	Elvis Presley	RCA
51		Give Me Some Wheels	Suzy Bogguss	Capitol Nashville
56		Greatest Hits	John Anderson	BNA
60		Greatest Hits	Confederate Railroad	Atlantic
	36	Hang of the Heartache	Desert Dolphins	Quality
39		Hit Country '96	Various Artists	K-Tel
43		The Hits	Hal Ketchum	Curb
26		I Lived to Tell It All	George Jones	MCA Nashville
47		I Will Always Love You and Other Greatest Hits	Dolly Parton	Columbia
53		Live	Jeff Foxworthy	Laughing Hyena
47		The Luv Collection: Real Luv	Various Artists	EMI-Capitol
60	28	Mandy Barnett	Mandy Barnett	Asylum
38		Mark Wills	Mark Wills	Mercury Nashville
45		"My Roots Are Showing..."	K. T. Oslin	BNA
38		NASCAR: Hotter Than Asphalt	Various Artists	Columbia
66		NFL Country	Various Artists	Gridiron
54		Now and Then	Shenandoah	Capitol Nashville
40		Paradise	John Anderson	BNA
	32	P.O. Box 423	Duane Steele	Mercury/PolyGram
	36	Remembering Stan Rogers: An East Coast Tribute II	Various Artists	Atlantica
50		The Rocky Mountain Collection	John Denver	RCA
32		Semi Crazy	Junior Brown	Curb
37		Smokin' Armadillos	Smokin' Armadillos	Curb
26		Some Things Are Meant to Be	Linda Davis	Arista Nashville
33		Stampede	Chris LeDoux	Capitol Nashville
38		Star of Wonder – A Country Christmas Collection	Various Artists	Arista Nashville
44		Starlite Lounge	David Ball	Warner Bros.
46		Super Hits	Alabama	RCA Nashville
66		Super Hits	Waylon Jennings	RCA Nashville
51		Super Hits	Keith Whitley	RCA Nashville
29		Three Hanks: Men with Broken Hearts	Hank Williams, Hank Williams, Jr. & Hank Williams III	Curb
54		Two Ways to Fall	Ty England	RCA Nashville
26		Unchained	Johnny Cash	American
42	31	You Still Got Me	Doug Supernaw	Giant

== Births ==
- April 2 -- Zach Bryan, nominated for Best Country Album at the 2024 Grammy Awards, was born in Okinawa, Japan.
- July 23 – Danielle Bradbery, winner of season four of NBC's The Voice.

== Deaths ==
- February 17 — Gus Hardin, 50, female singer best known for her Earl Thomas Conley duet "All Tangled Up in Love" (automobile accident)
- March 4 — Minnie Pearl, 83, legendary comedian known for her trademark greeting, "How-dee!" and her straw hat with price tag; a regular on Hee Haw (stroke).
- May 3 — Patsy Montana, 87, first female country singer to have a single sell one million copies ("I Want to Be a Cowboy's Sweetheart").
- June 16 — Anthony Armstrong Jones, 47, male singer best known for his Top Ten cover version of "Take a Letter Maria"
- August 22 – Oliver "Doolittle" Lynn, 69, husband of Loretta Lynn and key figure in many aspects of her career.
- September 9- Bill Monroe, 84, Singer
- December 10 — Faron Young, 64, Nicknamed "The Hillbilly Heartthrob", and "The Singing Sheriff" he had many hits including "Hello Walls" and "Live Fast, Love Hard, Die Young" (suicide).

== Hall of Fame inductees ==
=== Bluegrass Music Hall of Fame inductees ===
- Peter V. Kuykendall
- The Country Gentlemen
  - Charlie Waller
  - John Duffey
  - Eddie Adcock
  - Tom Gray

=== Country Music Hall of Fame inductees ===
- Patsy Montana (1908–1996)
- Buck Owens (1929–2006)
- Ray Price (1926–2013)

=== Canadian Country Music Hall of Fame inductees ===
- Myrna Lorrie
- Larry Delaney

== Major awards ==
=== Grammy Awards ===
- Best Female Country Vocal Performance — "Blue," LeAnn Rimes
- Best Male Country Vocal Performance — "World's Apart", Vince Gill
- Best Country Performance by a Duo or Group with Vocal — "My Maria", Brooks & Dunn
- Best Country Collaboration with Vocals — "High Lonesome Sound", Vince Gill (featuring Alison Krauss)
- Best Country Instrumental Performance — "Jam Man", Chet Atkins
- Best Country Song — "Blue", Bill Mack (Performer: LeAnn Rimes)
- Best Country Album — The Road to Ensenada, Lyle Lovett (Producers: Billy Williams (singer) and Lyle Lovett)
- Best Bluegrass Album — True Life Blues: The Songs of Bill Monroe, Various Artists (Producer: Todd Phillips)

=== Juno Awards ===
- Country Male Vocalist of the Year — Paul Brandt
- Country Female Vocalist of the Year — Shania Twain
- Country Group or Duo of the Year — The Rankin Family

=== Academy of Country Music ===
- Entertainer of the Year — Brooks & Dunn
- Song of the Year — "Blue", Bill Mack
- Single of the Year — "Blue," LeAnn Rimes
- Album of the Year — Blue Clear Sky, George Strait
- Top Male Vocalist — George Strait
- Top Female Vocalist — Patty Loveless
- Top Vocal Duo — Brooks & Dunn
- Top Vocal Group — Sawyer Brown
- Top New Male Vocalist — Trace Adkins
- Top New Female Vocalist — LeAnn Rimes
- Top New Vocal Duo or Group — Ricochet
- Video of the Year — "I Think About You", Collin Raye (Director: Steven Goldmann)

=== ARIA Awards ===
(presented in Sydney on September 30, 1996)

- Best Country Album - Home Fires (The Dead Ringer Band)

=== Canadian Country Music Association ===
- NCN Fans' Choice Award — Shania Twain
- Male Artist of the Year — Charlie Major
- Female Artist of the Year — Shania Twain
- Group or Duo of the Year — Prairie Oyster
- SOCAN Song of the Year — "My Heart Has a History," Paul Brandt, Mark D. Sanders
- Single of the Year — "Better Things to Do," Terri Clark
- Album of the Year — Terri Clark, Terri Clark
- Top Selling Album — Fresh Horses, Garth Brooks
- Video of the Year — "(If You're Not in It for Love) I'm Outta Here!," Shania Twain
- Vista Rising Star Award — Terri Clark
- Vocal Collaboration of the Year — Jim Witter and Cassandra Vasik

=== Country Music Association ===
- Entertainer of the Year — Brooks & Dunn
- Song of the Year — "Go Rest High on That Mountain," Vince Gill
- Single of the Year — "Check Yes or No," George Strait
- Album of the Year — Blue Clear Sky, George Strait
- Male Vocalist of the Year — George Strait
- Female Vocalist of the Year — Patty Loveless
- Vocal Duo of the Year — Brooks & Dunn
- Vocal Group of the Year — The Mavericks
- Horizon Award — Bryan White
- Music Video of the Year — "My Wife Thinks You're Dead", Junior Brown (Director: Michael McNamara)
- Vocal Event of the Year — "I Will Always Love You", Dolly Parton and Vince Gill
- Musician of the Year — Mark O'Connor

=== RPM Big Country Awards ===
- Canadian Country Artist of the Year — Shania Twain
- Best Country Album — The Woman in Me, Shania Twain
- Best Country Single — "Any Man of Mine", Shania Twain
- Top Male Vocalist — Charlie Major
- Top Female Vocalist — Shania Twain
- Top Group — Prairie Oyster
- Outstanding New Artist — Jason McCoy
- Top Country Composer(s) — Shania Twain

=== Hollywood Walk of Fame ===
Stars who were honored in 1996

Clint Black

=== Kennedy Center Honors ===
Country stars who were honored in 1996

Johnny Cash

== Other links ==
- Country Music Association
- Inductees of the Country Music Hall of Fame
