= The Best of Farmer's Daughter =

Greatest hits album by Farmer's Daughter
- Released: 1999
- Recorded: Greenhouse Studios, The Armoury, Blue Wave, Vancouver, British Columbia, Canada
- Genre: Country
- Length: 47:30
- Label: Universal Music Canada
- Producer: Tony Rudner; March Ramaer; Monroe Joes

Farmer's Daughter chronology
| This Is the Life (1998) | The Best of Farmer's Daughter (1999) |

Singles from The Best of Farmer's Daughter
- 1. "Walkin' in the Sunshine" Released: 1999; 2. "You and Only You" Released: 2000

The Best of Farmer's Daughter is the greatest hits album by Canadian country music group Farmer's Daughter, and was released in 1999 by Universal Music Canada

== Track listing ==
1. "Walkin' in the Sunshine" (Kostas, Jeff Hanna) - 3:45
2. "Cornfields or Cadillacs" (Marcus Hummon, Monty Powell, Mike Noble) - 3:33
3. "Blue Horizon" (Stan Meissner, Angela Kelman, Jake Leiske, Shauna Rae Samograd) - 3:41
4. "Freeway" (Angela Kelman, Jake Leiske, Shauna Rae Samograd) - 4:13
5. "You Said" (Beth Nielsen Chapman) - 3:28
6. "Borderline Angel" (LuAnn Reid, Tony Rudner) - 4:10
7. "Son of a Preacher Man" (John Hurley, Ronnie Wilkins) - 3:34
8. "I Wanna Hold You" (Bruce Miller) - 3:54
9. "Family Love" (Bruce Miller, Jake Leiske, Shauna Rae Samograd, Angela Kelman) - 3:20
10. "Lonely Gypsy Wind" (Greg Barnhill, Jake Leiske, Angela Kelman, Shauna Rae Samograd) - 3:08
11. "Callin' All You Cowboys" (Angela Kelman) - 3:43
12. "Now That I'm On My Own" (Darrell Scott) - 3:27
13. "You and Only You" (Kostas, Wally Wilson) - 3:34

== Chart performance ==
| Chart (1999) | Peak position |
|---|---|
| Canadian RPM Country Albums | 15 |
