= When You Get a Little Lonely =

Studio album by Maureen McCormick
- Released: April 4, 1995
- Recorded: 1994–1995
- Studios: Nightingale Studios (Nashville); Tempo Recording (Hollywood)
- Genres: Country, country pop
- Length: 34:41
- Label: Phantom Hill
- Producer: Barry Coffing (also exec.)

Singles from When You Get a Little Lonely
- 1. "When You Get a Little Lonely" Released: 1995; 2. "Tell Mama" Released: September 1995

When You Get a Little Lonely is the only solo studio album by American actress and singer Maureen McCormick. It was released on April 4, 1995, through the label Phantom Hill. After playing Marcia Brady in the sitcom The Brady Bunch, she was offered a solo record deal in the mid-1970s but rejected the offer to attend school. McCormick had previously recorded four albums as part of The Brady Bunch and a duet album with her co-star Christopher Knight. In 1994, she signed with her brother's record label, Phantom Hill, and recorded When You Get a Little Lonely in Nashville, Tennessee and Hollywood, California. Barry Coffing was the executive producer and arranged and produced all the songs. McCormick wanted to fuse genres into the album's overall country sound.

The album received mainly negative reviews; some reviewers were critical of McCormick's choice to record country music. She promoted it through live performances and CD signings. Its title track and "Tell Mama" were released as singles. When You Get a Little Lonely was re-released in 2008 as a Circuit City exclusive. Since the album's release, McCormick has continued to perform country music and has participated in the reality television show Gone Country. In a 2008 interview, McCormick said she was disappointed by restrictions to the recording process and wished she had written at least one song for it.

== Background and recording ==
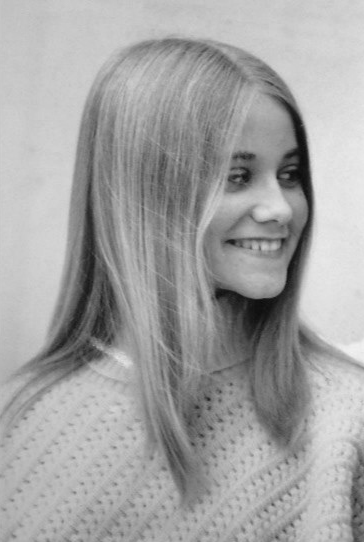
McCormick in a 1971 The Brady Bunch promotional photo

Maureen McCormick first rose to prominence while playing Marcia Brady in the sitcom The Brady Bunch. She entered the entertainment industry by performing jingles; at the age of 10, she sang for a Kellogg's advertisement. As a part of The Brady Bunch cast, she released four albums, the first of which she recorded at age 15. McCormick also released a duet album with her television co-star Christopher Knight in 1973. Victoria Miller, writing for the digital marketing platform AXS, considered her music with The Brady Bunch bubblegum pop; she cited the 1973 song "It's a Sunshine Day" as an example.

McCormick, however, identified with country music, saying she listened to the genre while growing up on her father's horse ranch. A "country-tinged tune" entitled "Little Bird" was among the songs on her album with Knight. When discussing her attraction to country, she said: "I love songs that tell stories. Words to me are the most important thing." After The Brady Bunch ended in 1974, a company offered McCormick a record deal to record a country album, describing it as her "natural sound". She rejected the offer to return to college and pursue a more "normal life". In a 2008 Entertainment Weekly interview, McCormick said she regretted not taking the deal, saying "I think it would've been interesting to see where it would've gone." In 1994, McCormick signed a recording contract with her brother's label Phantom Hill. During a 1995 Billboard interview, she said; "Music has always been my first love, and I've been waiting a long time for this opportunity. The wait just makes you stronger."

McCormick recorded the album in 1994 and 1995 in Nashville, Tennessee, and Hollywood, California. While in Nashville, she went to Music Row to find inspiration; after returning to California, she selected her favorite songs to include on When You Get a Little Lonely. She had considered hundreds of songs before deciding on the eleven in the final track listing. The executive producer Barry Coffing arranged and produced all of the tracks. A 1994 episode of Entertainment Tonight included portions of the Nashville recording sessions. McCormick described the album as "[her] debut singing"; when asked about her past music career, she said, "Well, those weren't solo songs. They were the Brady kids. And that's not me anymore." While completing When You Get a Little Lonely, McCormick was offered a cameo role on The Brady Bunch Movie (1995) but turned it down to focus on the album. She had also been approached the previous year about the same cameo but was unable to accept because she was playing Betty Rizzo in a Broadway production of the musical Grease.

== Composition and sound ==
McCormick described When You Get a Little Lonely as "country crossover" and said, "We tried to get some different styles, one that's upbeat, then there's a bluesy, jazzy, sexy song, then a commercial feeling". She listed Linda Ronstadt, James Taylor, Mary Chapin Carpenter, and the Eagles as her influences. Discussing the song selection process, McCormick said she tried to "get some different sounds together and have an album with a lot of a variety". AllMusic's Pemberton Roach referred to the album as a "completely straight-ahead modern Nashville country record", while Entertainment Weekly's Alanna Nash described it as country pop, citing its release as part of a trend of Hollywood celebrities recording music in Nashville. The instruments used on When You Get a Little Lonely include pedal steel guitar, fiddle, and piano, which a People magazine contributor called "all the twanging tools of the [country music] trade", and wrote that McCormick adopted a "Nashville accent".

The album credits include "Music City's finest" (David Hungate, J.D. Maness, and Larry Knechtel) and "the usual suspects" (Troy Seals, Nicolette Larson, and Gary Nicholson). Mike Hughes, writing for The Times Herald, described McCormick's cover of Nicolette Larson's 1985 single "When You Get a Little Lonely" as "an up-tempo, dance-hall tune in current country style". She also covered Rena Gaile's 1996 single "Cloud of Dust", and recorded a version of the Crickets' 1957 single "Oh, Boy!" at the suggestion of Bread front man David Gates. McCormick said "Oh Boy!" was her daughter's favorite song from the album.

Lisa Gutierrez, writing for Democrat and Chronicle, described When You Get a Little Lonely as a "truly grown-up work" in comparison to her performance as Marcia Brady. McCormick sings about sex using lyrics such as, "He does me wrong, he does me right. He does me crazy in the middle of the night." Other lyrics include "don't bury me on the love prairie". She also addresses "loss [and] the Wild West" in the songs. American singer-songwriter Wayland Patton appears as a guest artist on "We Must Have Done Something Right".

== Release and promotion ==
When You Get a Little Lonely was released through Phantom Hill on April 4, 1995, on CD and cassette formats. McCormick uploaded portions of the songs to her official website. McCormick, who was 38 at the time of the release, wanted to distance herself from the "perpetual-teenager image" of Marcia Brady. The packaging does not reference The Brady Bunch; it includes a picture of a two-year-old McCormick dressed as a cowgirl. The cover, however, bore a sticker saying "Marcia Marcia Marcia", which McCormick said was done by a public relations company and described its inclusion as "a big mistake".

McCormick told Billboard she felt "optimistic" that country radio would accept her music. During a 1995 interview, she said people, particularly DJs, enjoyed the album and her voice; Orlando Sentinel's Gary McKechnie wrote that it "seem[ed] to be popular with country music fans". The song "When You Get a Little Lonely" was the lead single and promoted through a music video. The video was shown on the 1995 television special Brady Bunch Home Movies. "Tell Mama" was released in September 1995 as the second single. When You Get a Little Lonely was made available as a digital download on Apple Music, but it was later removed from the platform. Record label Building re-released the album as an exclusive for Circuit City in 2008.

According to a 1994 Chicago Sun-Times report, McCormick planned to promote When You Get a Little Lonely with a tour. She held album signings in 1995 at a Hollywood Virgin Megastore, the Orlando record store Peaches Music & Video, and a Henrietta Media Play. As part of the Henrietta event, Media Play held a "Brady Bunch look-alike contest". McCormick promoted the album by performing at Lake Compounce, an amusement park in Bristol and Southington, Connecticut, on July 2, 1995. On October 21, 1995, she performed during an Indianapolis Ice game against the Detroit Vipers. She also signed autographs during the game's intermission as part of a "Brady Bunch Night". The following year, she sang at the Palmdale Playhouse in Palmdale, California. In August 2001, McCormick appeared alongside her The Brady Bunch co-stars on the game show The Weakest Link. On his official website, Barry Williams, who played Greg Brady, held a competition in which viewers could win prizes, one of which was a copy of When You Get a Little Lonely, for guessing the winner of The Weakest Link correctly.

== Critical reception ==
Professional ratings
Review scores
Source	Rating
AllMusic	1.5/5 stars
The Atlanta Journal-Constitution	1/4 stars
Entertainment Weekly	F
Time	D−

When You Get a Little Lonely received mainly negative reviews from critics. Some commentators recommended it for fans of The Brady Bunch. Pemberton Roach described McCormick as a "competent singer" with enthusiasm but said her upper register was "a little screechy at times". Roach cited "Cloud of Dust" as a highlight but was less positive about the album as a whole and said it "sounds like a well-produced L.A. songwriter demo". Despite praising the song selection, Hartford Courant's Anita M. Seline criticized McCormick's voice, specifically on her "tepid" version of "Oh Boy!". A People writer suggested McCormick record pop music or covers of 1970s Top 40 songs because "kitschy stuff, after all, has a remarkable shelf life". The reviewer said she "doesn't bring much conviction to the material" but her voice has a "sweet, rather pure timbre ... It's a very Brady sort of voice." Kathleen Adams and Lina Lofaro, writing for Time criticized McCormick's voice and said she "shows scant vocal or emotional range and her backup musicians follow suit".

Some commentators were critical of McCormick's decision to record country music. Alanna Nash panned When You Get a Little Lonely as "the most manufactured of country pop" and criticized McCormick for singing with "the overwrought exuberance of a high school variety show contestant". The Atlanta Journal-Constitution's Miriam Longino wrote that she "can carry a tune" and that the album has the "slickest arrangements and studio musicians", but she largely dismissed it as "a contrived attempt to cash in on country's popularity". Longino said McCormick's interpretation of country music was inauthentic, writing, "A pair of Tony Lama boots cannot transform this California actress into Patsy Cline". A St. Cloud Times reviewer criticized her for "tr[ying] her hand at country and go[ing] nowhere". A Time contributor dismissed When You Get a Little Lonely as "new country curbed and gutted". In a 2010 Newsday article, Daniel Bubbeo wrote, "it's doubtful [McCormick] caused Reba McEntire to have any sleepless nights".

== Aftermath ==
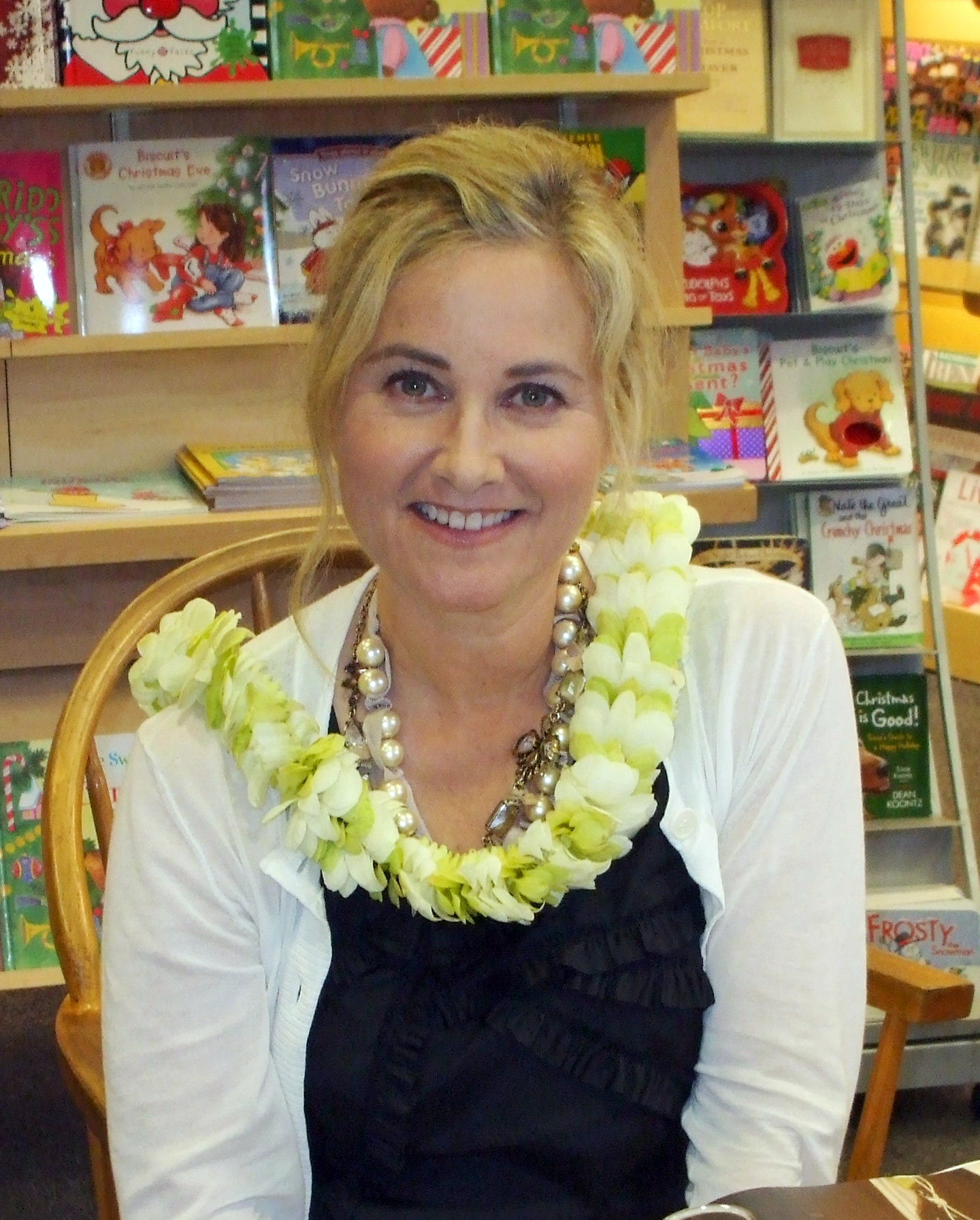
McCormick at a 2009 book signing

In a 2008 interview, McCormick said she was disappointed by the recording process for When You Get a Little Lonely: "I kinda felt like it wasn't done the right way. There are certain rules in Nashville, and my album didn't really follow them." She wished the process had been "more organic" and that she could have written at least one of the songs. When You Get A Little Lonely is her only album as a solo artist.

According to a 2015 AXS article, McCormick has "long been associated with country music", including her portrayal of Barbara Mandrell in the 1997 television film Get to the Heart: The Barbara Mandrell Story. She lip-synced to Mandrell's music, saying; "Really, in a piece like this, you're playing that person. I would never be able to sound like her." Also in 1997, McCormick was an opening act for Clint Black and Faith Hill, and performed with Hal Ketchum and the Confederate Railroad.

McCormick appeared in the music video for Brad Paisley's 2007 song "Online". The following year, she competed on the first season of the reality television show Gone Country; as the prize, John Rich would produce the winner's song, and it would be sent to radio. McCormick said it was a "lifelong dream to have a song on the radio". In March 2008, Julio Iglesias Jr. was announced as the winner of the season. Access Hollywood's executive producer Rob Silverstein hired McCormick as a red-carpet reporter for the 2008 CMT Music Awards after seeing her on Gone Country.

== Track listing ==
Credits are taken from the booklet of When You Get a Little Lonely. Barry Coffing produced all of the songs.

No.	Title	Writer(s)	Length
1.	"When You Get a Little Lonely"	Nicolette Larson, Wendy Waldman, Josh Leo	4:03
2.	"I'd Have to Call It Love"	Robert Ellis Orrall	3:17
3.	"Tell Mama"	Barry Coffing	3:03
4.	"Some Somebody"	Troy Seals, Mike Reid, Rhonda Gunn	3:28
5.	"We Must Have Done Something Right" (featuring Wayland Patton)	Marc Beeson, Liz Hengber	3:29
6.	"Cloud of Dust"	Judy Rodman, Tom Damphier	3:15
7.	"Go West"	Gretchen Peters	2:53
8.	"Oh, Boy!"	Norman Petty, Bill Tilghman, Sonny West	3:03
9.	"Might as Well Be Me"	Pam Tillis, Gary Nicholson	2:52
10.	"I Do But I Don't"	Bill Lloyd, Mark Irwin	2:37
11.	"I Can't Say"	George Teren, Bob Regan	2:41
Total length:			34:41

== Credits and personnel ==
The following credits were adapted from the booklet of When You Get a Little Lonely and AllMusic:

- Richard Abramson – stylist
- Osama Afifi – drums
- Barry Beckett – organ (Hammond)
- Marc Beeson – composer
- Chris Bellman – mixing
- Mike Botts – drums
- Carter Bradley – make-up
- Valerie Carter – vocals (background)
- Barry Coffing – arranger, composer, piano, producer, vocals (background)
- Jim Cox – piano
- Tom Damphier – composer
- Dan Dugmore – guitar, pedal steel
- David Eaton – engineer
- Kenny Edwards – vocals (background)
- Jim Gaines – photography
- Nicola Goode – cover design
- Rhonda Gunn – composer
- Liz Hengber – composer
- Steve Hill – guitar
- Randy Howard – fiddle, mandolin
- Chris Hufford – engineer, mixing
- David Hungate – bass
- Mark Irwin – composer
- Larry Knechtel – piano
- Craig Krampf – drums
- Bob Krusen – engineer
- Nicolette Larson – composer
- Albert Lee – guitar
- Josh Leo – composer
- Bill Lloyd – composer
- Jay Dee Maness – pedal steel
- Maureen McCormick – primary artist, vocals
- Gary Nicholson – composer
- Robert Ellis Orrall – composer
- David Pascal – art direction
- Wayland Patton – performer, primary artist, vocals
- Gretchen Peters – composer
- Norman Petty – composer
- Bob Regan – composer
- Mike Reid – composer
- Judy Rodman – composer
- Troy Seals – composer
- Leland Sklar – bass
- Hans J. Spurkel – photography
- George Teren – composer
- Bill Tilghman – composer
- Pam Tillis – composer
- Wendy Waldman – composer, vocals (background)
- Sonny West – composer

== Release history ==
Country	Date	Format	Label
United States	April 4, 1995	Cassette; CD	Phantom Hill
United States	April 3, 2008	CD	Building
