= The Trouble with the Truth =

The Trouble with the Truth may refer to:

- The Trouble with the Truth (album), 1996 album by Patty Loveless
- "The Trouble with the Truth" (song), a 1997 song written by Gary Nicholson and recorded by Patty Loveless
- The Trouble with the Truth (film), a 2011 American romantic drama film
