= You Said =

You Said may refer to:

- You Said (album), by Jermaine Jackson
- "You Said" (song), by Farmer's Daughter
- "You Said", by Fontaines D.C., from the album A Hero's Death
- "You Said", by Ryan Adams, from the album Prisoner (B-Sides)
