= Dynamite (disambiguation) =

Dynamite is a high explosive.

Dynamite may also refer to:

== Film and television ==
- AEW Dynamite, a professional wrestling television program by All Elite Wrestling (AEW)
- Dynamite Fighting Show, a professional kickboxing television program by Cătălin Moroșanu
- Dynamite (1929 film), an American pre-Code drama film
- Dynamite (1947 film), a Swedish crime film
- Dynamite (1949 film), an American film noir drama film
- Dynamite (2015 film), an Indian Telugu action thriller film
- "Dynamite" (The Power of Parker), a 2023 television episode

== Food ==
- Dinamita, a stuffed whole pepper in spring roll wrappers in Filipino cuisine
- Dynamite, a sandwich similar to a sloppy joe popular in New England

== Music ==
=== Albums ===
- Dynamite (The Supremes and the Four Tops album), 1971
- Dynamite (Stina Nordenstam album), 1996
- Dynamite (Jamiroquai album), or the title song (see below)
- Jermaine Jackson (album), released internationally as Dynamite
- Dynamite (Ike & Tina Turner album), 1963
- Dyna-Mite, a 2018 album by Jon Cleary

=== Songs ===
- "Dynamite" (Sly & the Family Stone song), 1968
- "Dynamite" (Afrojack song), 2014
- "Dynamite" (Asta song), 2015
- "Dynamite" (BTS song), 2020
- "Dynamite" (Desert Dolphins song), 1994
- "Dynamite" (Jamiroquai song), 2005
- "Dynamite" (fight song), the official fight song of Vanderbilt University
- "Dynamite" (Jermaine Jackson song), 1984
- "Dynamite" (Liza Fox song), 2014
- "Dynamite" (Taio Cruz song), 2010
- "Dynamite" (Westlife song), 2019
- "Dynamite!" (song), by Stacy Lattisaw
- "Dynamite (Sean Paul song)", 2021, featuring Sia
- "Dynamite!", a 1999 song by The Roots
- "Dyna-mite", a 1973 song by Mud
- "Dynomite" (song), a 1975 song by Bazuka
- "Dynamite", a 1957 song by Brenda Lee co-written by Mort Garson and Tom Glazer
- "Dynamite (Cliff Richard and the Shadows song)", 1959
- "Dynamite", a song by Christina Aguilera from the album Keeps Gettin' Better: A Decade of Hits
- "Dynamite", a song by Junior Senior from the 2003 album D-D-Don't Don't Stop the Beat
- "Dynamite", a song by Nause
- "Dynamite", a song by Rod Stewart from the album Out of Order
- "Dynamite", a song by Runner from their 1979 self-titled album
- "Dynamite", a song by the Scorpions from their 1982 album Blackout
- "Dynamite", a song by Shinee from the album Dream Girl – The Misconceptions of You
- "Dynamite", a song by Sigrid from the album Sucker Punch
- "Dynamite", a song by VIXX from the album Zelos
- "Dynamite", a 2016 song by Adore Delano

== People ==
- Dynamite Kid (1958–2018), English professional wrestler
- Roberto Dinamite (1954–2023), Brazilian footballer and politician
- Ryan Day (snooker player) (born 1980), Welsh snooker player nicknamed "Dynamite"
- Keane Barry (born 2002), Irish darts player nicknamed "Dynamite"

== Print media ==
- Dynamite Entertainment, an American comic book company
- Dynamite (magazine), a children's magazine published by Scholastic Corporation from 1974 to 1992

== Other ==
- Dynamite, Washington
- Dyna-Mite, a fictional character in the Marvel Comics Universe, now named Destroyer
- DynaMite (Bratz), a doll collection from the fashion doll brand
- Dynamite!!, a mixed martial arts and kickboxing event held annually at New Year's in Japan
- Dynamite, a 1988 board game by Parker Brothers
- "Dyn-o-mite!", the catchphrase of J.J. Evans (Jimmie Walker) on the 1970s sitcom Good Times
- Dynamite AC, an association football club from Haiti
- Dynamite Fighting Show, a Romania-based kickboxing and martial arts promotion
- Groupe Dynamite, clothing retailer
- Dynamite (Freizeitpark Plohn), a roller coaster
- PCB Dynamites, a Pakistani women's cricket team
