= Welcome to Woody Creek =

Studio album by Nitty Gritty Dirt Band
- Released: 2004
- Genre: Country, country rock, folk rock, bluegrass
- Length: 43:58
- Label: Dualtone
- Producer: U No Who

Nitty Gritty Dirt Band chronology
Will the Circle Be Unbroken, Volume III (2002)	Welcome to Woody Creek (2004)	Speed of Life (2009)

Welcome to Woody Creek is the 2004 album from the Nitty Gritty Dirt Band.

== Critical reception ==
Professional ratings
Review scores
Source	Rating
AllMusic	3.5/5 stars

Alex Henderson of AllMusic concludes his review with, "Welcome to Woody Creek isn't as essential as the Dirt Band's best '60s and '70s recordings; nonetheless, it's a solid, respectable outing that will please die-hard fans of the veteran country-rockers."

No Depression reviews the album and says, "For Welcome To Woody Creek, which comes on the heels the third Circle disc, the five-man band got back to basics, cutting the album themselves (except for a cameo by steel guitarist Dan Dugmore). The result is a blend of country, bluegrass, folk and rock that is a microcosm of the band’s 40-year history."

Billboard writes, "The classic Nitty Gritty Dirt Band lineup convened at Jimmy Ibbotson's Unami studio in Woody Creek, Colo., to record the bulk of the veteran act's latest effort. The result is vintage Dirt."

Gus Walker begins his review of the album for True West Magazine by writing, "For almost 40 years the Nitty Gritty Dirt Band has served up a comforting roux of Country, Folk and Rock music to soothe the listener’s soul."

Country Standard Time's Dan MacIntosh begins his review with, "The Woody Creek referred to in this album's title is the Colorado hometown of Nitty Gritty Dirt Band co-leader Jimmy Ibbotson, which is also where the music was recorded. Such an idyllic setting may well have inspired the warmth and friendliness of this bluegrass-tinged album."

== Track listing ==
No.	Title	Writer(s)	Length
1.	"Walkin' in the Sunshine"	Jeff Hanna; Kostas	3:39
2.	"Forever Don't Last"	Jimmy Ibbotson; John McEuen	3:39
3.	"Jealous Moon"	Jeff Hanna; Matraca Berg; Tim Krekel	4:25
4.	"It's Morning"	Jimmy Ibbotson	3:49
5.	"Get Back"	John Lennon; Paul McCartney	2:23
6.	"She"	Gram Parsons; Chris Ethridge	5:23
7.	"Safe Back Home"	Jimmy Ibbotson; Jeff Hanna	2:54
8.	"Party on the Mountain"	Jimmy Ibbotson; Bob Carpenter; Jeff Hanna	3:17
9.	"Any Love but Our Love"	Bob Carpenter; Tom Kell; Jeff Hanna	2:43
10.	"It's a New Day"	Matraca Berg; Tim Krekel	3:16
11.	"Old Time's Sake"	Jeff Hanna; Marcus Hummon	3:54
12.	"Midnight at Woody Creek"	John McEuen; Jimmie Fadden	4:36
Total length:			43:58

== Personnel ==
- Jeff Hanna – vocals, acoustic, electric, 12-string, baritone and slide guitar
- Jimmy Ibbotson – vocals, acoustic guitar, mandolin, mandolo, bass and accordion
- Bob Carpenter – vocals, acoustic and electric pianos, hammond organ, bass and accordion
- Jimmie Fadden – harmonica and drums
- John McEuen – banjo, acoustic guitar, mandolin, and fiddle

Special guest musician

- Dan Dugmore – steel guitar on "Any Love But Our Love"
