= Dynomite =

Dynomite may refer to:

- "Dynomite" (song), by Bazuka, 1975
- Dynomite! (video game), a 2002 game for PC
- "Dynomite!", a catchphrase used by J. J. Evans in the American TV series Good Times

== See also ==
- Dynamite (disambiguation)
