= Juno Awards of 1997 =

Canadian music awards ceremony

- Date: 9 March 1997
- Venue: Copps Coliseum, Hamilton, Ontario
- Hosted by: Jann Arden

Television/radio coverage
- Network: CBC

The Juno Awards of 1997, representing Canadian music industry achievements of the previous year, were awarded on 9 March 1997 in Hamilton, Ontario at a ceremony in the Copps Coliseum. Jann Arden was host for the major ceremonies which were broadcast on CBC Television.

Nominations were announced on 29 January 1997. Major winners were Celine Dion and The Tragically Hip.

== Nominees and winners ==
=== Best Female Vocalist ===
Winner: Celine Dion

Other Nominees:

- Deborah Cox
- Lara Fabian
- Amanda Marshall
- Alannah Myles

=== Best Male Vocalist ===
Winner: Bryan Adams

Other Nominees:

- Paul Brandt
- Corey Hart
- John McDermott
- Neil Young

=== Best New Solo Artist ===
Winner: Terri Clark

Other Nominees:

- Damhnait Doyle
- Chantal Kreviazuk
- Wendy Lands
- Duane Steele

=== Group of the Year ===
Winner: The Tragically Hip

Other Nominees:

- 54-40
- I Mother Earth
- Moist
- Noir Silence

=== Best New Group ===
Winner: The Killjoys

Other Nominees:

- Limblifter
- Pluto
- Starkicker
- Victor

=== Songwriter of the Year ===
Winner: Alanis Morissette (Glen Ballard, co-songwriter)

Other Nominees:

- Bryan Adams (with Robert John "Mutt" Lange)
- Dean McTaggart
- Amy Sky
- The Tragically Hip

=== Best Country Female Vocalist ===
Presented by Sloan

Winner: Shania Twain

Other Nominees:

- Terri Clark
- Patricia Conroy
- Rachel Matkin
- Michelle Wright

=== Best Country Male Vocalist ===
Winner: Paul Brandt

Other Nominees:

- Chris Cummings
- Charlie Major
- Jason McCoy
- Duane Steele

=== Best Country Group or Duo ===
Winner: The Rankin Family

Other Nominees:

- Farmer's Daughter
- Prairie Oyster
- Quartette
- Thomas Wade and Wayward

=== International Achievement Award ===
Winners:

- Celine Dion
- Alanis Morissette
- Shania Twain

=== Best Instrumental Artist ===
Winner: Ashley MacIsaac

Other Nominees:

- Richard Abel
- Hennie Bekker
- Samuel Reid and Ernest Lyons
- Sandule and Nikolai

=== Best Producer ===
Winner: Garth Richardson, "Bar-X-the Rocking M" by Melvins and "Mailman" by The Jesus Lizard

Other Nominees:

- Bryan Adams (with Robert John "Mutt" Lange), "The Only Thing That Looks Good on Me Is You" and "Let's Make a Night to Remember" by Bryan Adams
- Bruce Fairbairn (with The Cranberries), "Free to Decide" and "When You're Gone" by The Cranberries
- David Foster, "Runaway" by The Corrs and "Both Sides Now" by Natalie Cole
- Corey Hart, "Black Cloud Rain" and "Simplicity" by Corey Hart

=== Best Recording Engineer ===
Winner: Paul Northfield, "Another Sunday" and "Leave It Alone"

Other Nominees:

- Stuart Bruce, "Seeds of Love" and "God Rest Ye Merry Gentlemen" by Loreena McKennitt
- Colin Nairne, "Secrets in Your Heart" and "White Water" by Murray McLauchlan
- Lenny de Rose, "Get Up" by Starkicker and "Huron Carol" by Don Ross
- Randy Staub, "Until it Sleeps" and "Hero of the Day" by Metallica

=== Canadian Music Hall of Fame ===
Winner: Lenny Breau (posthumously), Gil Evans (posthumously), Maynard Ferguson, Moe Koffman, Rob McConnell

=== Walt Grealis Special Achievement Award ===
Winner: Dan Gibson

== Nominated and winning albums ==
=== Best Album ===
Winner: Trouble at the Henhouse, The Tragically Hip

Other Nominees:

- Amanda Marshall, Amanda Marshall
- 18 til I Die, Bryan Adams
- Falling Into You, Celine Dion
- Hi™ How Are You Today?, Ashley MacIsaac

=== Best Children's Album ===
Winner: Songs from The Tree House, Martha Johnson

Other Nominees:

- Jumpin' Jack, Jack Grunsky
- Like a Ripple on the Water, Kim Brodey and Jerry Brodey
- Maestro Orpheus and the World Clock, R.H. Thomson
- Walking in the Sun, Jake Chenier

=== Best Classical Album (Solo or Chamber Ensemble) ===
Winner: Scriabin: The Complete Piano Sonatas, Marc-André Hamelin

Other Nominees:

- Bach: French Suites, Angela Hewitt
- Fialkowska Plays Szymanowski, Janina Fialkowska
- Music of Bach's Sons, Les Violins du Roy
- Paganini: 24 Caprices, James Ehnes

=== Best Classical Album (Large Ensemble) ===
Winner: Ginastera/Villa-Lobos/Evangelista, I Musici de Montréal

Other Nominees:

- Handel: Water Music, Tafelmusik, musical director Jeanne Lamon
- Kodaly: Hary Janos, Peacock Variations, Montreal Symphony Orchestra, conductor Charles Dutoit
- Mussrogsky: Pictures of an Exhibition, Toronto Symphony Orchestra, conductor Jukka-Pekka Saraste
- Ravel: The Piano Concertos, Montreal Symphony Orchestra, conductor Charles Dutoit, soloist Jean-Yves Thibaudet

=== Best Classical Album (Vocal or Choral Performance) ===
Winner: Berlioz: La Damnation de Faust, Choeur et orchestre symphonique de Montréal, conductor Charles Dutoit

Other Nominees:

- Benjamin Britten: The Canticles, tenor Benjamin Butterfield, baritone Brett Polegato, countertenor Daniel Taylor
- Chi il Bel Sogno... What a Beautiful Dream, l'Orchestre symphonique de Laval, soprano Manon Feuble
- Purcell: Halcyon Days, soprano Nancy Argenta
- Richard Margison Sings French and Italian Arias, Canadian Opera Company Orchestra, tenor Richard Margison

=== Best Album Design ===
Winner: John Rummen and Crystal Heald, Decadence - Ten Years of Various Nettwerk

Other Nominees:

- Doug Aucoin, Living River by Rawlins Cross
- Eve Hartling, Jeff Kleinsmith, and Jannie McInnes, So Wound by Jale
- John Rummen, Rarities, B-Sides and Other Stuff by Sarah McLachlan
- Paolo Venturi, Wayne Hoecherl, Nest by Odds

=== Best Blues/Gospel Album ===
Winner: Right to Sing the Blues, Long John Baldry

Other Nominees:

- Alive and Loose, Kenny "Blues Boss" Wayne
- Fire, Tongues of Fire
- If My Daddy Could See Me Now, Johnny V
- Sixteen Shades of Blue, The Whiteley Brothers

=== Best Selling Album (Foreign or Domestic) ===
Winner: Falling Into You, Céline Dion

Other Nominees:

- Daydream, Mariah Carey
- Mellon Collie and the Infinite Sadness, The Smashing Pumpkins
- The Score, Fugees
- (What's the Story) Morning Glory?, Oasis

=== Best Mainstream Jazz Album ===
Winner: Ancestors, Renee Rosnes

Other Nominees:

- Even Canadians Get the Blues, Rob McConnell and The Boss Brass
- Live at Bourbon St., Lenny Breau with Dave Young
- Oscar Peterson Meets Roy Hargrove and Ralph Moore, Oscar Peterson
- Two by Two, Piano Bass Duets Vol II, Dave Young

=== Best Contemporary Jazz Album ===
Winner: Africville Suite, Joe Sealy

Other Nominees:

- FireWater, NOJO
- Spirit in the Air, Sonny Greenwich
- Time Zones, James Gelfand
- Touché, Paul Bley and Kenny Wheeler

=== Best Roots or Traditional Album - Group ===
Winner: Matapédia, Kate & Anna McGarrigle

Other Nominees:

- En Spectacle, La Bottine Souriante
- High or Hurtin', Blackie and the Rodeo Kings
- Living River, Rawlins Cross
- Victory Train, Bill Bourne and Shannon Johnson

=== Best Roots or Traditional Album - Solo ===
Winner: Drive-In Movie, Fred Eaglesmith

Other Nominees:

- Bal Canaille, Danielle Martineau
- Gulliver's Taxi, Murray McLauchlan
- Life on a String, Daniel Koulack
- No Boundaries, Natalie MacMaster

=== Best Alternative Album ===
Winner: One Chord to Another, Sloan

Other Nominees:

- It's Sydney or the Bush, The Inbreds
- Limblifter, Limblifter
- Purple Blue, Eric's Trip
- Self=title, Treble Charger

=== Best Selling Francophone Album ===
Winner: Live à Paris, Celine Dion

Other Nominees:

- Luce Dufault, Luce Dufault
- Noir Silence, Noir Silence
- Pure, Lara Fabian
- Quatre saisons dans le désordre, Daniel Bélanger

=== North Star Rock Album of the Year ===
Winner: Trouble at the Henhouse, The Tragically Hip

Other Nominees:

- Brand New Day, The Watchmen
- Hemi-Vision, Big Sugar
- Scenery and Fish, I Mother Earth
- Test for Echo, Rush

== Nominated and winning releases ==
=== Single of the Year ===
Winner: "Ironic", Alanis Morissette

Other Nominees:

- "Ahead by a Century", The Tragically Hip
- "Because You Loved Me", Celine Dion
- "Birmingham", Amanda Marshall
- "Sleepy Maggie", Ashley MacIsaac

=== Best Classical Composition ===
Winner: Picasso Suite (1964), Harry Somers

Other Nominees:

- "The Charmer", Chan Ka Nin
- "Quintette for Winds", Malcolm Forsyth
- "Lyric for Orchestra (1960)", Harry Somers
- "Lonely Child", Claude Vivier

=== Best Rap Recording ===
Winner: What It Takes, Choclair

Other Nominees:

- Bright Lights, Big City, Scales Empire
- FitnRedi, Rascalz
- The Master Plan, Dream Warriors
- Naughty Dread, Kardinal Offishall

=== Best R&B/Soul Recording ===
Winner: Feelin' Alright, Carlos Morgan

Other Nominees:

- Blindfolded and Ready, The Earthtones
- In Another Lifetime, The McAuley Boys
- Never Stop, George St. Kitts
- Can I Get Close, Gavin Hope

=== Best Music of Aboriginal Canada Recording ===
Winner: Up Where We Belong, Buffy Sainte-Marie (The induction was rescinded in 2025, over her American citizenship.)

Other Nominees:

- Freedom, Chester Knight and the Wind
- Innu Town, Claude McKenzie
- Go Back, Jerry Alfred and the Medicine Beat
- Tudjaat, Tudjaat

=== Best Reggae/Calypso Recording ===
Winner: Nana McLean, Nana McLean

Other Nominees:

- Just the Other Night, Lenn Hammond
- Rise Up!, Kali and Dub (Hayes Thurton)
- Rude Boy on the Bus, Adrian Miller
- time bomb, Tatix

=== Best Global Album ===
Winner: Africa Do Brasil, Paulo Ramos Group

Other Nominees:

- Anhata, Randev Pandit
- Asza, Asza
- Futur, Alpha Yaya Diallo
- Gravity, Jesse Cook

=== Best Dance Recording ===
Winner: "Astroplane (City of Love Mix)", BKS

Other Nominees:

- "All My Dreams (Don't Ever Leave) (Extended Skywalkers Mix)", Laya
- "Forever Young (Tempered Club Mix)", Temperance
- "Happy Days (original)", Paul Jacobs
- "In Your Arms (album version)", Emjay

=== Best Video ===
Winner: Jeth Weinrich, "Burned Out Car" by Junkhouse

Other Nominees:

- Andrew MacNaughtan, "Run Runaway" by Great Big Sea
- Stephen Scott and James Cooper, "Soaked" by The Killjoys
- Curtis Wehrfritz, "Someone Who's Cool" by Odds
- Eric Yealland, "Ahead by a Century" by The Tragically Hip
