= All I Do Is Love Her =

Single by James Bonamy

from the album What I Live to Do
- B-side: "Jimmy and Jesus"
- Released: October 26, 1996
- Genre: Country
- Length: 3:59
- Label: Epic
- Songwriter(s): Skip Ewing, Wayland Patton
- Producer(s): Doug Johnson

James Bonamy singles chronology
"I Don't Think I Will" (1996)	"All I Do Is Love Her" (1996)	"The Swing" (1997)

"All I Do Is Love Her" is a song recorded by American country music artist James Bonamy. It was released in October 1996 as the fourth single from the album What I Live to Do. The song reached No. 27 on the Billboard Hot Country Singles & Tracks chart. The song was written by Skip Ewing and Wayland Patton.

== Chart performance ==
Chart (1996–1997)	Peak position
US Hot Country Songs (Billboard)	27
Canadian RPM Country Tracks	22
