= The Trouble with the Truth (album) =

Studio album by Patty Loveless
- Released: January 23, 1996
- Studios: Woodland Sound Studios, Emerald Sound Studios and Masterfonics (Nashville, Tennessee)
- Genre: Country
- Length: 36:41
- Label: Epic
- Producer: Emory Gordy Jr.

Patty Loveless chronology
When Fallen Angels Fly (1994)	The Trouble with the Truth (1996)	Long Stretch of Lonesome (1997)

Singles from The Trouble with the Truth
- 1. "You Can Feel Bad" Released: December 30, 1995; 2. "A Thousand Times a Day" Released: April 13, 1996; 3. "Lonely Too Long" Released: August 24, 1996; 4. "She Drew a Broken Heart" Released: December 21, 1996; 5. "The Trouble with the Truth" Released: April 26, 1997

The Trouble with the Truth is the eighth studio album by American country music artist Patty Loveless, released on January 23, 1996. It peaked at number 10 on the Billboard Top Country albums charts, and number 86 on the Pop charts. It was certified Platinum for shipments of over 1,000,000 copies in the U.S. The singles "Lonely Too Long" and "You Can Feel Bad" both made number 1 on the Hot Country Songs charts; "She Drew a Broken Heart" hit number 4. "A Thousand Times a Day" and the title track both made Top 20 hitting number 13 and 15 respectively.

"Tear-Stained Letter" is a cover of a song which was originally recorded by British singer Richard Thompson, and again in 1988 by country singer Jo-El Sonnier, whose version was a Top 10 country hit. Additionally, "A Thousand Times a Day" was previously cut by George Jones on his 1993 album High-Tech Redneck.

== Critical reception ==
Professional ratings
Review scores
Source	Rating
AllMusic	4/5 stars
Billboard	(favorable)
Cash Box	(favorable)
Chicago Tribune	3/4 stars
Entertainment Weekly	B+
Los Angeles Times	3/4 stars

The album received a mostly-favorable review in Billboard which said that Loveless "manages to sound simultaneously contemporary and traditional", but criticized the cover of "Tear-Stained Letter" for not fitting thematically with the rest of the songs.

== Track listing ==
No.	Title	Writer(s)	Length
1.	"Tear-Stained Letter"	Richard Thompson	3:28
2.	"The Trouble with the Truth"	Gary Nicholson	4:21
3.	"I Miss Who I Was (With You)"	Jim Lauderdale, John Leventhal	3:19
4.	"Everybody's Equal in the Eyes of Love"	Tony Arata	3:27
5.	"Lonely Too Long"	Mike Lawler, Bill Rice, Sharon Vaughn	4:38
6.	"You Can Feel Bad"	Matraca Berg, Tim Krekel	3:24
7.	"A Thousand Times a Day"	Gary Burr, Nicholson	3:31
8.	"She Drew a Broken Heart"	Jon McElroy, Ned McElroy	2:52
9.	"To Feel That Way at All"	Lauderdale, Jack Tempchin	3:47
10.	"Someday I Will Lead the Parade"	Arata, D. Scott Miller	4:00

== Personnel ==
As listed in liner notes.

- Patty Loveless – vocals
- John Hobbs – keyboards
- Mike Lawler – keyboards
- Mike Rojas – keyboards
- Butch Lee – Hammond B3 organ
- Tom Britt – electric guitar
- Steve Gibson – acoustic guitar, electric guitar
- Brent Mason – electric guitar
- Biff Watson – acoustic guitar, electric guitar
- Jerry Douglas – dobro, lap steel guitar (4)
- Paul Franklin – steel guitar (1–5, 7–10)
- Dan Dugmore – steel guitar (6), lap steel guitar (8)
- Emory Gordy Jr. – bass
- Lonnie Wilson – drums (1–5, 7, 9, 10)
- Craig Krampf – drums (6, 8)
- Stuart Duncan – fiddle, mandolin
- Kathy Burdick – backing vocals
- Vince Gill – backing vocals
- Tim Hensley – backing vocals
- Donna McElroy – backing vocals
- Liana Manis – backing vocals
- Carmella Ramsey – backing vocals
- Dawn Sears – backing vocals
- Harry Stinson – backing vocals
- Jim Rushing – bass vocals
- Jeff White – backing vocals
- Curtis Young – backing vocals

Strings on "Someday I Will Lead the Parade"

- Emory Gordy Jr. – string arrangements
- John Catchings – cello
- Kristin Wilkinson – first string viola
- Jim Grosjean, Kathryn Plummer and Gary Vanosdale – viola
- David Davidson, Conni Ellisor, Mary Olsen and Pamela Sixfin – violin

== Production ==
- Emory Gordy Jr. – producer
- Russ Martin – recording, overdub recording
- John Guess – mixing
- Amy Hughes – additional recording, recording assistant, overdub assistant
- Mark Frigo – overdub assistant
- Chris Stone – additional recording assistant
- Derek Bason – mix assistant
- Glenn Meadows – mastering
- Lauren Koch – production coordinator
- Bill Johnson – art direction
- Jodi Lynn Miller – art direction
- Caroline Greyshock – photography
- Ann Waters – styling
- Eric Barnard – hair, make-up
- Fitzgerald / Hartley Co. – management

== Chart performance ==
Chart (1996)	Peak position
U.S. Billboard Top Country Albums	10
U.S. Billboard 200	86
Canadian RPM Country Albums	16
