= Roots and Wings (James Bonamy album) =

Studio album by James Bonamy
- Released: June 24, 1997
- Recorded: 1996–1997
- Genre: Country
- Length: 33:28
- Label: Epic
- Producer: Doug Johnson

James Bonamy chronology
What I Live to Do (1996)	Roots and Wings (1997)

Roots and Wings is the second and final studio album by American country music artist James Bonamy. It was released June 24, 1997, on Epic Records Nashville. The single "The Swing" was a number 31 on the Billboard country charts in 1997. "Naked to the Pain" and "Little Blue Dot" were also released as singles, although neither reached the Top 40. The title song was previously recorded by Doug Supernaw on his 1995 album You Still Got Me.

== Critical reception ==
Thom Owens of Allmusic rated the album three stars out of five, calling the album's content "uneven" but saying that Bonamy "is singing better than ever". Larry Stephens of Country Standard Time was less favorable, saying that Bonamy "sounds like a pop singer trying to do country". He thought that "Daddy Never Had a Chance in Hell" was the best-written song, and that the title track was "touching". Giving it 3 out of 5 stars, David Simons of New Country wrote that "One has to wade through the occasionally predictable slices of hokum[…]to get to the good stuff, but there's enough of that to successfully get Bonamy and his listeners to the end of this record."

== Track listing ==
CD
No.	Title	Writer(s)	Length
1.	"Roots and Wings"	Bill Anderson, Skip Ewing	3:58
2.	"The Swing"	Robert Ellis Orrall, Bob Regan	3:23
3.	"Naked to the Pain"	Don Pfrimmer, Richard Wold	3:45
4.	"I Knew I'd Need My Heart Someday"	James Bonamy, Pat Bunch, Doug Johnson	2:35
5.	"Daddy Never Had a Chance in Hell"	Roger Springer, Tony Martin	3:33
6.	"The Heart Stops the Clock"	Pat Bunch, Chuck Jones	3:05
7.	"Some Things I Know"	Sally Barris, Burton Banks Collins	3:05
8.	"Long as I Got You"	Ewing, Don Sampson	2:32
9.	"Little Blue Dot"	Susan Longacre, Rick Giles	4:28
10.	"When God Dreams"	Bunch, Johnson	3:04
Total length:			33:28

== Personnel ==
- James Bonamy – lead vocals
- Joe Chemay – bass guitar
- Larry Franklin – fiddle
- Paul Franklin – pedal steel guitar
- John Hobbs – keyboards, strings
- Michael Jones – background vocals
- Paul Leim – drums, percussion
- Liana Manis – background vocals
- Terry McMillan – harmonica, percussion
- Blue Miller – electric guitar, background vocals
- Brent Rowan – electric guitar
- Billy Joe Walker, Jr. – acoustic guitar
- Biff Watson – acoustic guitar, mandolin
- Curtis Young – background vocals

== Chart performance ==
Chart (1997)	Peak position
U.S. Billboard Top Country Albums	25
U.S. Billboard Top Heatseekers	11
