= Girls Will Be Girls (Farmer's Daughter album) =

Studio album by Farmer's Daughter
- Released: December 6, 1993
- Recorded: Blue Wave, Vancouver, British Columbia, Canada
- Genre: Country
- Length: 41:08
- Label: Stubble Jumper Music
- Producer: Tony Rudner

Farmer's Daughter chronology
Girls Will Be Girls (1993)	Makin' Hay (1996)

Girls Will Be Girls is the first studio album by Canadian country music group Farmer's Daughter, and was released in 1993 by Stubble Jumper Music.

== Track listing ==
1. "Girls Will Be Girls" (Montana, Reeves, Allison) - 3:03
2. "I Wanna Hold You" (Bruce Miller) - 3:54
3. "She Still Haunts You" (Miller, Shauna Rae Samograd, Jake Leiske) - 4:17
4. "A Crazy Ole Moon" (Garth Brooks, Lena Lucas, D. James) - 3:12
5. "You Wish" (John McLaughlin) - 4:26
6. "Borderline Angel" (LuAnn Reid, Tony Rudner) - 4:10
7. "Son of a Preacher Man" (John Hurley, Ronnie Wilkins) - 3:34
8. "Family Love" (Miller, Leiske, Samograd, Angela Kelman) - 3:20
9. "Fallin' Outta Love" (M. Rheault, Leiske) - 3:34
10. "Callin' All You Cowboys" (Kelman) - 3:43
11. "I Need a Little Tenderness" (S.E. Campbell) - 3:55

== Chart performance ==
Chart (1993)	Peak position
Canadian RPM Country Albums	16
