= Dunk (band) =

- Also known as: Starkicker, blue.bottle.fly.
- Origin: St. Catharines, Ontario, Canada
- Genres: Power pop, pop rock, pop, alternative rock
- Years active: 1993–2000
- Labels: Sony
- Past members: Doug Boudreau; Ben Dunk; Nick Dunk; Tawgs Salter

Dunk, also previously known as Starkicker and blue.bottle.fly., was a Canadian power pop band from St. Catharines, Ontario, who were active from the mid 1990s to the early 2000s.

== History ==
The band formed in the early 1990s, consisting of vocalist and guitarist Ben Dunk, bassist Nick Dunk and drummer Doug Boudreau. The original name of the band was blue.bottle.fly. The band sold 1,500 copies of their independent album in the St. Catharines area, after which they were signed by Sony. In 1996, the band changed their name to Starkicker due to another band on the Sony label having a similar name, Bluebottle Kiss. The band released the album Beach Music through Sony in 1996. The first single from the album, "Get Up", peaked at No. 10 the week of August 26, 1996 on the RPM Alternative chart. By September 1996, the album had sold about 10,000 units. The second single from the album, "Neil Armstrong", enjoyed even greater success, peaking at No. 26 on the RPM Top 100 singles chart.

Beach Music was a top-30 Canadian campus radio chart hit in the late summer and fall of 1996.

The band garnered a nomination for Best New Group at the 1997 Juno Awards.

Deciding that the name Starkicker didn't fit, in 1999 the band changed their name to Dunk, added guitarist Tawgs Salter to the lineup, and released their follow-up album Time to Fly under their new name on September 7, 1999. The album's first single, "Crowdsurfing", peaked on the RPM Rock chart at No. 18.

On July 1, 2000, the band performed at Edgefest.

== Ben Dunk ==
Ben Dunk has worked as a songwriter and producer for other artists. Dunk co-wrote Edwin's 1999 hit song "Trippin'" and co-wrote and produced Wave's 2001 hit songs "California" and "Think It Over".
