= This Is the Life (Farmer's Daughter album) =

Studio album by Farmer's Daughter
- Released: October 6, 1998
- Recorded: Greenhouse Studios, Vancouver, British Columbia, Canada
- Genre: Country
- Length: 46:12
- Label: Universal Music Canada
- Producer: Marc Ramaer; Farmer's Daughter

Farmer's Daughter chronology
Makin' Hay (1996)	This Is the Life (1998)	The Best of Farmer's Daughter (1999)

Singles from This is the Life
- 1. "Freeway" Released: 1998; 2. "Blue Horizon" Released: 1999

This Is the Life is the third studio album by Canadian country music group Farmer's Daughter, and was released in 1998 by Universal Music Canada.

== Track listing ==
1. "Freeway" (Marcus Hummon, Angela Kelman, Jake Leiske, Shauna Rae Samograd) - 4:13
2. "Blue Horizon" (Stan Meissner, Kelman, Leiske, Samograd) - 3:41
3. "This Is the Life (The Lois and Eddy Song)" (Meissner, Kelman, Leiske, Samograd) - 4:54
4. "It's Easy to Tell" (Kostas, Kelman, Leiske, Samograd) - 3:45
5. "No Understanding Your Love" (Simone Hardy, Stewart Peters) - 4:09
6. "Ballad of Me and You" (Marcus Hummon, Kelman, Leiske, Samograd) - 3:27
7. "Let It Ride" (Randy Bachman, Fred Turner) - 3:53
8. "Prairie Sky" (Chris Pelcer, Kelman, Leiske, Samograd) - 3:43
9. "Overwhelming Sense of Goodbye" (Meissner, Kelman, Leiske, Samograd) - 3:44
10. "Wait for Me" (Chris Rodriguez, Kelman, Leiske, Samograd) - 3:55
11. "Little Church in Memphis" (Kostas, Kelman, Leiske, Samograd) - 3:56
12. "Willie" (Amos Gypson) - 2:45

== See also ==
- Music of Canada
