= Songs from the Tree House =

Studio album by Martha Johnson
- Released: 1995
- Recorded: 1991–1994, Web Studios
- Genre: Children's music
- Length: 35 minutes
- Label: Muffin Music
- Producers: Martha Johnson and Mark Gane

Songs from the Tree House is a 1995 album by Canadian singer and songwriter Martha Johnson. It was released through Muffin Music and was produced by Johnson and Mark Gane. Songs from The Tree House won a Juno Award for Best Children's Album in 1997.

== Track listing ==
1. Into The Tree House (Martha Johnson) (1:05)
2. Everboy Needs A Home (Martha Johnson/Mark Gane) (1:47)
3. My Little Sister (Martha Johnson) (1:43)
4. When You Grow Up (Martha Johnson) (2:39)
5. It Was An Accident (Martha Johnson) (1:33)
6. Beautiful Trees (Martha Johnson) (2:10)
7. The Golden Rule (Martha Johnson) (3:01)
8. The Itsy Bitsy Spider (Traditional, arranged by (Martha Johnson/Mark Gane) (1:16)
9. The Wind (Martha Johnson) (0:50)
10. White Coral Bells (Traditional, arranged by (Martha Johnson) (0:58)
11. My Best Friend (Martha Johnson) (1:51)
12. Don't Give Me Those Beans (Martha Johnson) (2:27)
13. I Made It Myself (Martha Johnson) (2:09)
14. Are We There Yet (Martha Johnson) (1:08)
15. Row Row Row Your Boat (Traditional, arranged by (Martha Johnson) (1:10)
16. The Shang Yang (The Rainbird) (Martha Johnson) (2:06)
17. Sailing Through The Night (Martha Johnson) (2:55)
18. Shooting Stars (Martha Johnson) (2:17)
19. Goodnight From The Tree House (Martha Johnson) (1:07)

== Reception ==
AllMusic gave a favorable review for the album, commenting that it was "a wonderful children's album that neither children nor parents will tire of hearing."
