= She Drew a Broken Heart =

Single by Patty Loveless

from the album The Trouble with the Truth
- Released: December 21, 1996
- Genre: Country
- Length: 2:52
- Label: Epic
- Songwriters: Jon McElroy, Ned McElroy
- Producer: Emory Gordy Jr.

Patty Loveless singles chronology
"Lonely Too Long" (1996)	"She Drew a Broken Heart" (1996)	"The Trouble with the Truth" (1997)

"She Drew a Broken Heart" is a song written by Jon McElroy and Ned McElroy, and recorded by American country music artist Patty Loveless. It was released in December 1996 as the fourth single from her eight album, The Trouble with the Truth (1996). The song charted for 20 weeks on the US Billboard Hot Country Singles and Tracks chart, reaching number four during the week of March 15, 1997.

== Critical reception ==
Deborah Evans Price from Billboard described "She Drew a Broken Heart" as "a feisty uptempo tune about a woman whose goodbye note is written in lipstick on her ex-lover's satin sheets." She added, "Laced with fiddle and buoyed by the sass in Loveless' vocals, this is an extremely strong offering that should find instant acceptance at country radio."

Rock and Roll Legend Bob Seger sang this song during Loveless' induction into the Country Music Hall of Fame in October 2023.

== Charts ==
=== Weekly charts ===
Chart (1996–1997)	Peak position
Canada Country Singles (RPM)	2
US Hot Country Songs (Billboard)	4

=== Year-end charts ===
Chart (1997)	Position
Canada Country Tracks (RPM)	46
US Hot Country Songs (Billboard)	35
