= Walkin' in the Sunshine =

Single by Farmer's Daughter

from the album The Best of Farmer's Daughter
- Released: 1999
- Genre: Country
- Length: 3:45
- Label: Universal Music Canada
- Songwriters: Jeff Hanna; Kostas
- Producer: Tony Rudner

Farmer's Daughter singles chronology
"Let It Ride" (1999)	"Walkin' in the Sunshine" (1999)	"You and Only You" (2000)

"Walkin' in the Sunshine" is a song written by Jeff Hanna and Kostas and recorded by Canadian country music group Farmer's Daughter. It was released in 1999 as the first single from their greatest hits album, The Best of Farmer's Daughter. It peaked at number 7 on the RPM Country Tracks chart in January 2000. In 2004, the song was also recorded by Nitty Gritty Dirt Band for their studio album Welcome to Woody Creek.

== Chart performance ==
Chart (1999–2000)	Peak position
Canada Country Singles (RPM)	7
