= High-Tech Redneck =

Album by George Jones

Studio album by George Jones
- Released: November 23, 1993
- Studio: Masterfonics and the Music Mill; Nashville, TN
- Genre: Country
- Length: 30:46
- Label: MCA
- Producer: Buddy Cannon; Norro Wilson

George Jones chronology
Walls Can Fall (1992)	High-Tech Redneck (1993)	The Bradley Barn Sessions (1994)

Singles from High-Tech Redneck
- 1. "High-Tech Redneck" Released: October 1993

High-Tech Redneck is an album by American country music singer George Jones. It was released in 1993 on the MCA Nashville Records label and went Gold in 1994.

"A Thousand Times a Day" was later recorded by Patty Loveless on her 1996 album The Trouble with the Truth, from which it was released as the second single, becoming a Top 20 hit for her that year. "The Visit" was later recorded by Chad Brock on his 2000 album Yes!

== Reception ==
Professional ratings
Review scores
Source	Rating
AllMusic	1.5/5 stars
The Rolling Stone Album Guide	3/5 stars

Jimmy Guterman of New Country magazine rated the album 4 out of 5 stars, saying that "Jones expertly walks through a series of boasts, gags... fables, and depictions of emotional devastation that suggest what Hank Williams might have sounded like had he lived to record using the Nashville sound." Guterman also praised the duet with Sammy Kershaw on "Never Bit a Bullet Like This" as a "riot", and noted the album's cover of "Hello Darlin'" that it "succeeds both as a tribute to Twitty's style and to Jones' ability to wrench new ideas out of a song country fans have heard hundreds of times."

== Track listing ==
No.	Title	Writer(s)	Length
1.	"High-Tech Redneck"	Byron Hill, Zack Turner	2:26
2.	"I've Still Got Some Hurtin' Left to Do"	Donny Kees, Richard Ross	2:51
3.	"The Love in Your Eyes"	Wayland Holyfield, Norro Wilson	3:52
4.	"The Visit"	Gene Ellsworth, Brad Rodgers, Charles Stefl	3:21
5.	"Silent Partners"	Bobby Braddock	3:03
6.	"Tear Me Out of the Picture"	Bill Rice, Sharon Rice, Mike Lawler	3:25
7.	"A Thousand Times a Day"	Gary Burr, Gary Nicholson	3:06
8.	"Never Bit a Bullet Like This" (featuring Sammy Kershaw)	Jim Foster, Mark C. Petersen	2:21
9.	"Forever's Here to Stay"	Larry Bastian, Buddy Cannon	3:38
10.	"Hello Darlin'"	Conway Twitty	2:43

== Personnel ==
- George Jones – vocals, guitar
- Barry Beckett – piano
- David Briggs – piano
- Mike Chapman – bass
- Sonny Garrish – steel guitar
- Rob Hajacos – fiddle
- John Hughey – steel guitar
- Kirk "Jellyroll" Johnson – harmonica
- Sammy Kershaw – vocals
- Mike Lawler – keyboards
- Brent Mason – guitar
- Reggie Young – guitar
- Danny Parks – guitar
- Larry Paxton – bass
- Steve Turner – drums
- Lonnie Wilson – drums
- Vince Gill – background vocals
- Cindy Walker – background vocals
- Dennis Wilson – background vocals
- Chely Wright – background vocals
- Curtis Young – background vocals
- Nashville String Machine – strings

== Certifications ==
Region	Certification
United States (RIAA)	Gold
