= The Cruzeros =

Canadian band

- Origin: Kelowna, British Columbia, Canada
- Genres: Country rock
- Years active: 1996–present
- Labels: Independent
- Members: Barry Mathers; Curtis Tulman; Gary Smyth; Jay Terrence; Jim Ryan; Rod Miller; Rachel Matkin

The Cruzeros are a Canadian country rock band from Kelowna, British Columbia. Their concert lineup includes main songwriter and lead vocalist Barry Mathers on guitar and mandolin, Curtis Tulman on vocals, guitar, harmonica and saxophone, Jim Ryan on vocals and bass, songstress Rachel Matkin on vocals and mandolin, Jay Terrence on drums, Gary Smyth on lead guitar and Rod Miller on keys and accordion.

== History ==
The Cruzeros were formed by Mathers and Tulman in 1985 under the name Sea Cruise. They played top forty cover tunes on the pub and nightclub circuit in Canada's British Columbia Interior. They began writing and recording their own songs later that year and for the next decade home-produced singles which were played on local radio and television through videos produced by the British Columbia Music Project. The band went on a tour of Mexico, and subsequently changed the name to The Cruzeros. During this time the band members settled in Kelowna and began raising families.

In 1995, the band received funding through FACTOR to produce an album, which they did with Vancouver producer Bill Buckingham. The self-titled album was released to radio in 1996. It was played nationally, and its success earned them a 1997 JUNO nomination for Country Group of the Year.

During the next 13 years they launched three albums independently, which spawned a total of 20 top forty hits on the national country charts, eight videos on CMT and a number of award citations, including a Canadian Indy for Country Album of the Year, CCMA Special Instrumentalist of the Year three years running and BCCMA Group, Songwriter and Album of the Year awards.

The band performed about 150 concerts per year across Canada, with forays into the United States, Mexico and Europe.

The Cruzeros retired from active touring in 2008; they have appeared a few times locally since then to perform at a benefit concert or special event. Mathers continues to produce and engineer from his home studio, Redhouse Recording and has joined with Matkin to form the rootsy Dirt Road Opera. Tulman heads the worship department for the Willow Park Church Network and joins Smyth and Miller in the eclectic gypsy jazz group Cowboy Bob. Ryan works as a studio musician who is regularly called to recording sessions in Vancouver, Toronto and Nashville. Terrance continues to perform locally.

== Discography ==
=== Albums ===
Year	Album
1996	The Cruzeros
2001	El Niño
2005	Scandalosa

=== Singles ===
Year	Title	CAN Country	Album
1996	"Am I Invisible"	29	The Cruzeros
1996	"Take You By the Heart"	13	The Cruzeros
1996	"Landslide"	22	The Cruzeros
1997	"The Last Time"	32	The Cruzeros
1998	"Into Your Eyes"		The Cruzeros
2000	"Am I Losing You"		El Niño
2001	"This Old Road"		El Niño
2002	"Piece of Stone"		El Niño
2002	"Roses and a Cross"		El Niño
2002	"Tangled Up in You"		El Niño
2003	"Going There with Grace"		El Niño
2004	"November 11th"		Scandalosa
2005	"Load Me Up"		Scandalosa
2006	"The Way You're Looking at Me"		Scandalosa
2007	"Cowboy Boots"		Scandalosa
2008	"The Way It Is Around Here"		Scandalosa

=== Music videos ===
Year	Video
2005	"Load Me Up"
