= Tim Krekel =

American musician (1950–2009)

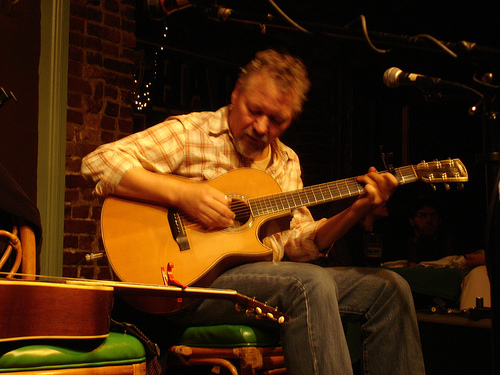

Background information
- Born: Timothy Joseph Krekel; October 10, 1950; Louisville, Kentucky
- Died: June 24, 2009 (aged 58)
- Genres: Rock, country music
- Website: timkrekel.com

Timothy Joseph Krekel (October 10, 1950 – June 24, 2009) was an American rock singer and country music songwriter from Louisville, Kentucky.

== Early life ==
Krekel was born in Louisville, Kentucky, in 1950. He became interested in music early in life and his first lessons were on the drums. He began taking guitar lessons at age 10 or 11, when he realised that "the guitar player was up front getting all the attention, [like] Rick Nelson". He was singing and playing guitar for audiences by the time he was 12, gigging in Lebanon, Kentucky, at places including The Golden Horseshoe and Club 68. He began to write his own songs in high school, although he was initially reluctant to share them.

Krekel's first band was an eight-piece basement band called The Octaves. He continued to improve his skills and, by the late 1960s, he was in a popular Louisville band called Dusty. It was around this time that two of Krekel's peers, Steve Ferguson and Terry Adams, went off and started NRBQ, returning to Louisville with a record contract. For the first time, Krekel thought seriously about music as a profession. He and Dusty moved to New York City, where they played gigs for a few months while Krekel began to write more seriously. After about six months, Krekel moved back to Louisville to pursue his career closer to home.

Still under the name Dusty, he started another band which developed a strong local following. Krekel reported: "We played almost every Sunday night at this place called the Storefront Congregation. There was always someone really good sittin' in with us, like Sam Bush, who would bring his electric violin and tear the place up."

== Professional career ==
=== 1970 to 1989 ===
While in Louisville in the early 1970s, Krekel grouped with a band consisting of himself on guitar and vocals, John Owen (bass and vocals), and Bobby Jones (drums and vocals). They first played at 118 W. Washington Street behind white soul singer Len Wade (for then-lease-owner Eddie Donaldson). When Wade left the gig three months into a six-month contract, Krekel, Owen and Jones carried on with Jones singing lead and Krekel and Owen singing harmony. They favored Crosby, Stills, Nash and Young, POCO, the Byrds, some of Krekel's originals, and general pop.

Vaughn Meader (from Massachusetts, then living in Louisville and having recorded another album—not released) also sat in. Local musicians (including Jamey Aebersold from New Albany, Indiana) also came in periodically and played jazz, as well as Gary Falk, a locally popular saxophonist and recording studio owner in Louisville.

Krekel, Owen, and Jones then went a block down from 118 W. Washington Street to play at the Red Dog. Here, Steve Ferguson (from NRBQ) sat in periodically with his guitar and sang on occasion during the winter.

Around that time, Krekel made friends in Nashville and was soon playing gigs there. He did some recording for Jack Clement. Krekel soon got a road gig with Billy Swan (who had a huge hit with "I Can Help"). That band toured the United States and Europe for a year. Swan returned to playing with Kris Kristofferson, and Krekel resumed gigging around Nashville. After Krekel unknowingly performing for Jimmy Buffett's manager, Buffett and Chet Atkins recommended Krekel to Buffett, who needed a new guitarist. Krekel was hired by Buffett and was his lead guitarist for a couple of years in the late 1970s and again in the 1980s. During his first stint with Buffett, Krekel played on the Son of a Son of a Sailor album and appeared with him on Saturday Night Live, as well as in the 1978 film FM. They also toured with the Eagles. Krekel had also assembled his band "The Sluggers" with John Owen, guitarist Thomas Goldsmith, keyboardist Jay Spell and Louisville drummer Dave Marasco.

Krekel was offered the opportunity to make his own record and decided to leave Buffett's band to pursue his own musical vision. His first effort, with the Sluggers Crazy Me, was released in 1979. However, the Capricorn label folded three months after the album's debut. It was the first album produced by Tony Brown and was a critical success, recorded at Brian Ahern's and Emmylou Harris' house in Coldwater Canyon in Los Angeles, with the Enactron truck in the driveway doing the recording. The Sluggers continued to play bars and colleges, primarily in the Southeast but with some forays up East, until early 1980, when Krekel's agent, Don Light, persuaded Krekel to leave the band and embark on a solo career. He later assembled another version of the Sluggers, with Tom Comer (stage name Tom Comet) on bass and David Willis Bailey on drums.

Krekel continued to write, perform and play with other musicians. He recorded his next album for Arista Records with producer Terry Manning; Over The Fence, with The Sluggers, was released in 1986. Rolling Stone called the Sluggers "a roots-based guitar band that matters".

Krekel and the Sluggers toured the country for a few years performing with musicians including Carl Perkins, the Blasters and Stevie Ray Vaughan.

=== 1990 to 2000 ===
The Italian record company, Appaloosa Records, released his Out Of The Corner in 1991. It received a four-star rating from CD Review, which also touted Krekel as "one of American Rock 'N Roll's great unknowns." By 1991, Krekel had acquired a dedicated following in the U.S. and in Europe.

In 1993, disillusioned with the music industry, Krekel moved back to Louisville. Rejuvenated by his return to familiar surroundings, Krekel remembered why he began to make music in the first place. He started a new band, the Groovebillys, and pursued music with a renewed vigor.

Krekel and the Groovebillys first release, L&N, quickly became the best-selling record in Louisville—outselling national releases. The band's next release, 1999's Underground, hit number one in local sales its first week. In reviewing the album, The Courier-Journal said "Krekel works the roots-rock territory with an authority gained from 25 years in the business".

=== 2000 to 2012 ===
In 2002 Happy Town was released across the U.S. on the Envoy/FFE label. Krekel along with drummer Mike Alger and bassist Rick Harper recorded the CD over the latter part of 2001, with the assistance of engineer David Barrick (Barrick Recording Studio) and co-producer Ben Ewing (Nashville-based Artists Envoy Agency). The backing tracks were recorded over three days end of August 2001 with overdubs recorded a few weeks later. The CD was originally to be by Tim Krekel and the Kasualties, with a song titled "We're All Casualties" as the lead-off track. That version was never finished and remains unreleased. With the events of 9/11, "Kasualties" was considered inappropriate, and was issued as Tim Krekel. A re-recorded version of the song later appeared on the TKO CD.

In May 2005, a horse named Giacomo won the Kentucky Derby and Krekel resurrected a song he wrote in the early 1990s, named "No Mo Do Giacomo". The new recording soon took on a life of its own and caught the eye of NBC Sports which filmed Krekel and his band and showed highlights of the performance during a pre-Preakness National broadcast. About the same time that Krekel's album World Keeps Turnin' was being pressed onto thousands of CDs, millions of race fans were sitting in front of their TVs seeing Krekel and the band play "No Mo Do Giacomo". In 2007, Krekel released Soul Season on the Natchez Trace Label, which featured Michael Webb and the Tim Krekel Orchestra.

In March 2009, Krekel was diagnosed with cancer. By mid-June 2009, Krekel's health took a drastic turn for the worse and at the final stages of what he described as "a most wonderful life!", Krekel was able to die at home under the loving care of his family and hospice on June 24, 2009.

In 2012, Louisville based sonaBLAST! Records posthumously released Krekel's final work, Sings Up The Sun.

== Works ==
=== Discography ===
- Crazy Me (1979)
- Over the Fence (1986)
- Out of the Corner (1991)
- L&N (with the Groovebillys) (1998)
- Underground (with the Groovebillys) (1999)
- Happy Town (2002)
- World Keeps Turnin' (2006)
- Soul Season (2007)
- Sings Up The Sun (2012) – released after his death.

=== Songwriting ===
The songs he wrote or co-wrote were performed, among others, by:

- Dr. Feelgood ("No Mo Do Yakamo") - which appeared on their album, A Case of the Shakes
- Crystal Gayle ("Turning Away") - which appeared on her album, Cage the Songbird
- Alan Jackson ("Anywhere on Earth You Are") - from Like Red on a Rose
- Patty Loveless ("You Can Feel Bad") - which appeared on her album, The Trouble with the Truth
- Martina McBride ("Cry on the Shoulder of the Road")
- Delbert McClinton ("Blues as Blues Can Get")
- The Nitty Gritty Dirt Band ("It's a New Day", "Jealous Moon")
- Kim Richey ("Come Around", "Didn't I", "Echoes of Love", "That's a Lie")
- Shakin' Stevens ("Turning Away")
- Aaron Tippin ("Cold Gray Kentucky Morning")
- Sam Bush ("All Night Radio")
- Jason and the Scorchers ("I Can't Help Myself") - on their album Fervor
- Marshall Chapman ("I Love Everybody") ("Big Lonesome") ("Sick of Myself") ("Love Slave") ("In the Fullness of Time") ("Somebody Like You")
- Shane Alexander ("Angel's Share")

=== Collaborations ===
Krekel also played guitar on Jimmy Buffett's album, Son of a Son of a Sailor. He also played guitar on Buffett's live album You Had to Be There on the track "He Went to Paris".

== See also ==
- Margaritaville Cafe: Late Night
- List of people from the Louisville metropolitan area
