= Now That I'm on My Own =

Single by Farmer's Daughter

from the album Makin' Hay
- Released: 1997
- Genre: Country
- Length: 3:27
- Label: MCA
- Songwriter: Darrell Scott
- Producer: Gerry Leiske

Farmer's Daughter singles chronology
"Lonely Gypsy Wind" (1996)	"Now That I'm on My Own" (1997)	"You Said" (1997)

"Now That I'm on My Own" is a song recorded by Canadian country music group Farmer's Daughter. It was released in 1997 as the third single from their second studio album, Makin' Hay. It peaked at number 10 on the RPM Country Tracks chart in July 1997.

== Chart performance ==
Chart (1997)	Peak position
Canada Country Singles (RPM)	10

=== Year-end charts ===
Chart (1997)	Position
Canada Country Tracks (RPM)	84
