= A Thousand Times a Day =

Single by Patty Loveless

from the album The Trouble with the Truth
- Released: April 13, 1996
- Genre: Country
- Length: 3:31
- Label: Epic
- Songwriters: Gary Burr, Gary Nicholson
- Producer: Emory Gordy Jr.

Patty Loveless singles chronology
"You Can Feel Bad" (1995)	"A Thousand Times a Day" (1996)	"Lonely Too Long" (1996)

"A Thousand Times a Day" is a song written by Gary Burr and Gary Nicholson. It was originally recorded by American country musician, singer, and songwriter George Jones on his 1993 album High-Tech Redneck.

American singer Patty Loveless later recorded it for her third album with Epic Records, The Trouble with the Truth (1996). Her version was released in 1996 as that album's second single and charted for 20 weeks on the US Billboard Hot Country Singles and Tracks chart, reaching number 13 during the week of July 27, 1996.

== Critical reception ==
Deborah Evans Price from Billboard wrote, "Few vocalists can match the depth of emotion that Loveless brings to a ballad, and she once again delivers a stunning performance on this fine song from her current Epic album, "The Trouble With The Truth". The mournful fiddle and understated production add to the poignancy of Loveless' delivery and the emotion in the lyric." Wendy Newcomer from Cash Box said, "If Patty Loveless can sing a dud song, I've never heard it. Her in-your-face honesty and the song's unapologetic message are a double delight. She's probably the only contemporary female singer who can take a song that was also recorded by George Jones and bring an equal amount of passion to the table."

== Charts ==
Chart (1996)	Peak position
Canada Country Singles (RPM)	27
US Hot Country Songs (Billboard)	13
