= She's Got a Mind of Her Own =

Single by James Bonamy

from the album What I Live to Do
- B-side: "Amy Jane"
- Released: December 26, 1995
- Recorded: 1995
- Genre: Country
- Length: 3:27
- Label: Epic
- Songwriters: Billy Livsey, Don Schlitz
- Producer: Doug Johnson

James Bonamy singles chronology
"Dog on a Toolbox" (1995)	"She's Got a Mind of Her Own" (1995)	"I Don't Think I Will" (1996)

"She's Got a Mind of Her Own" is a song written by Billy Livsey and Don Schlitz, and recorded by American country music artist James Bonamy. It was released on December 26, 1995 as the second single from the album What I Live to Do. The song reached number 26 on the Billboard Hot Country Singles & Tracks chart.

The song was originally the B-side of the album's debut single "Dog on a Toolbox", but that song was withdrawn early in its chart run.

== Chart performance ==
Chart (1995–1996)	Peak position
Canada Country Singles (RPM)	20
US Hot Country Songs (Billboard)	26
