= Blue Horizon (song) =

Single by Farmer's Daughter

from the album This Is the Life
- Released: 1999
- Genre: Country
- Length: 3:41
- Label: Universal Music Canada
- Songwriters: Stan Meissner; Angela Kelman; Jake Leiske; Shauna Rae Samograd
- Producers: Marc Ramaer; Farmer's Daughter

Farmer's Daughter singles chronology
"Freeway" (1998)	"Blue Horizon" (1999)	"Let It Ride" (1999)

"Blue Horizon" is a song recorded by Canadian country music group Farmer's Daughter. It was released in 1999 as the second single from their third studio album, This Is the Life. It peaked at number 6 on the RPM Country Tracks chart in April 1999.

== Chart performance ==
Chart (1999)	Peak position
Canada Country Singles (RPM)	6

=== Year-end charts ===
Chart (1999)	Position
Canada Country Tracks (RPM)	16
