= I Don't Think I Will =

Single by James Bonamy

from the album What I Live to Do
- B-side: "Heartbreak School"
- Released: May 14, 1996
- Recorded: 1995
- Genre: Country
- Length: 3:34
- Label: Epic
- Songwriter: Doug Johnson
- Producer: Doug Johnson

James Bonamy singles chronology
"She's Got a Mind of Her Own" (1995)	"I Don't Think I Will" (1996)	"All I Do Is Love Her" (1996)

"I Don't Think I Will" is a song written by Doug Johnson, and recorded by American country music artist James Bonamy. It was released on May 14, 1996 as the third single from the album What I Live to Do. The song reached No. 2 on the Billboard Hot Country Singles & Tracks chart, behind "She Never Lets It Go to Her Heart" by Tim McGraw and it is his highest-charting single.

== Critical reception ==
Dan Kuchar of Country Standard Time thought that "I Don't Think I Will" was one of the strongest tracks on the album, saying that it was "tender." Bob Paxman, in The Encyclopedia of Country Music, wrote that Bonamy is "capable of tackling emotionally complex ballads, even with his relative youth and limited life experience."

== Music video ==
The music video was directed by Greg Crutcher and premiered in mid-1996.

== Chart performance ==
"I Don't Think I Will" debuted at number 67 on the U.S. Billboard Hot Country Singles & Tracks for the week of May 11, 1996.

Chart (1996)	Peak position
Canada Country Singles (RPM)	8
US Hot Country Songs (Billboard)	2

=== Year-end charts ===
Chart (1996)	Position
Canada Country Tracks (RPM)	87
US Country Songs (Billboard)	36
