= Dynamite (Desert Dolphins song) =

Single by Desert Dolphins

from the album Hang of the Heartache
- Released: 1994
- Genre: Country
- Length: 3:19
- Label: Wolfe Lake
- Songwriter: Grant Heywood
- Producer: Randall Prescott

Desert Dolphins singles chronology
"Dynamite" (1994)	"Here's What They Say" (1995)

"Dynamite" is a song recorded by Canadian country music group Desert Dolphins. It was released in 1994 as their debut single. It peaked at number 10 on the RPM Country Tracks chart in October 1994.

== Chart performance ==
Chart (1994)	Peak position
Canada Country Singles (RPM)	10

=== Year-end charts ===
Chart (1994)	Position
Canada Country Tracks (RPM)	98
