= Foolproof (Desert Dolphins song) =

Single by Desert Dolphins

from the album Hang of the Heartache
- Released: 1996
- Genre: Country
- Label: Quality
- Songwriters: Richard Fagan; Kim Williams; Ron Harbin
- Producer: Randall Prescott

Desert Dolphins singles chronology
"Lisa Marie" (1995)	"Foolproof" (1996)	"That's the Way It Goes" (1997)

"Foolproof" is a song recorded by Canadian country music group Desert Dolphins. It was released in 1996 as the first single from their debut album, Hang of the Heartache. It peaked at number 10 on the RPM Country Tracks chart in October 1996.

== Chart performance ==
Chart (1996)	Peak position
Canada Country Singles (RPM)	10
