= Dynamite, Washington =

Unincorporated community in Washington, United States

Dynamite
- Unincorporated community
- Location within the state of Washington
- Coordinates: 47°29′46″N 117°27′4″W
- Country: United States
- State: Washington
- County: Spokane
- Elevation: 2,333 ft (711 m)

Population (2010)
  - Total: 8
- Time zone: UTC-8 (Pacific (PST))
  - Summer (DST): UTC-7 (PDT)
- GNIS feature ID: 1510923

Dynamite is a small unincorporated community in Spokane County, Washington, United States. The elevation of Dynamite is 2,333 feet. It is located about 13 miles south of Downtown Spokane in the Channeled Scablands. There is no real community in Dynamite, and the immediate surrounding area is largely forested or farmland with houses spaced well apart. The James T. Slavin Conservation Area is located a couple of miles to the north.

Two roads in the vicinity of Dynamite, Dynamite Lane and Blasted Lane, indicate the general location. A train station and warehouse lay in ruins besides the tracks, Marshall is to the nnw and manufacturered dynamite, this was the storage location. U.S. Route 195 a highway and major north–south thoroughfare stretching from Spokane south through the Palouse to Lewiston, Idaho runs about two miles east of Dynamite's location.
