= Desert Dolphins =

Canadian country music group

- Origin: Kitchener, Ontario, Canada
- Genres: Country
- Years active: 1993-1997
- Labels: Wolfe Lake; Quality Music
- Past members: Grant Heywood; Peter Padalino; Rocky Howell; Jamie Todd; Peter Beacock; Sean Gilders; Daniel Davies

Desert Dolphins was a Canadian country music group. Their 1994 single "Dynamite" reached the Top 10 of the RPM Country Tracks chart. They later returned to the Top 20 with their 1996 single "Foolproof."

The band was founded in 1993 in Kitchener, Ontario. Its original lineup was Grant Heywood (lead vocals, mandolin), Peter Padalino (guitar, keyboards, vocals), Rocky Howell (guitar, vocals), and Jamie Todd (various instruments). Padalino was a former member of Major Hoople's Boarding House. By mid-1995, the lineup had changed to Heywood, Peter Beacock (keyboards), Sean Gilders (bass guitar), and Daniel Davies (guitars). Randall Prescott of the band Prescott-Brown produced their album.

== Discography ==
=== Albums ===
Title	Details	Peak positions
Title	Details	CAN Country
Hang of the Heartache	Release date: June 6, 1996; Label: Quality Music	36

=== Singles ===
Year	Single	Peak positions	Album
Year	Single	CAN Country	Album
1994	"Dynamite"	10	Hang of the Heartache
1995	"Here's What They Say"	25	Hang of the Heartache
1995	"Lisa Marie"	23	Hang of the Heartache
1996	"Foolproof"	10	Hang of the Heartache
1997	"That's the Way It Goes"	41	Hang of the Heartache
1997	"Can't Get the Hang of the Heartache"	35	Hang of the Heartache
1997	"Your Only Romeo"	33	Hang of the Heartache

=== Music videos ===
Year	Video
1995	"Here's What They Say"
1995	"Lisa Marie"
