= The Trouble with the Truth (song) =

- CD-Single Cover

Single by Patty Loveless

from the album The Trouble with the Truth
- Released: April 26, 1997
- Genre: Country
- Length: 4:21
- Label: Epic
- Songwriter: Gary Nicholson
- Producer: Emory Gordy Jr.

Patty Loveless singles chronology
"She Drew a Broken Heart" (1996)	"The Trouble with the Truth" (1997)	"You Don't Seem to Miss Me" (1997)

"The Trouble with the Truth" is a song written by Gary Nicholson, and recorded by American country music artist Patty Loveless. It was released in April 1997 as the fifth and final single and title track from her album The Trouble with the Truth.

The song charted for 20 weeks on the Billboard Hot Country Singles and Tracks chart, reaching number 15 during the week of July 12, 1997.

== Other versions ==
Joan Baez also cut a version of the song during an early 1990s recording session in Nashville, but the recording remained unissued until released in 2012 as a bonus track on the remastered rerelease of her 1992 album Play Me Backwards.

== Chart positions ==
Chart (1997)	Peak position
Canada Country Singles (RPM)	24
US Hot Country Songs (Billboard)	15
