= Makin' Hay =

Studio album by Farmer's Daughter
- Released: October 23, 1996
- Recorded: The Armoury, Vancouver, British Columbia, Canada
- Genre: Country
- Length: 37:58
- Label: Universal Music Canada
- Producer: Monroe Jones

Farmer's Daughter chronology
Girls Will Be Girls (1993)	Makin' Hay (1996)	This Is the Life (1998)

Singles from Makin' Hay
- 1. "Fallin' Outta Love" Released: 1996; 2. "Cornfields or Cadillacs" Released: 1996; 3. "Lonely Gypsy Wind" Released: 1996; 4. "Now That I'm On My Own" Released: 1997; 5. "You Said" Released: 1997; 6. "Inclemency" Released: 1998

Makin' Hay is the second studio album by Canadian country music group Farmer's Daughter, and was released in 1996 by Universal Music Canada.

== Track listing ==
1. "Cornfields or Cadillacs" (Marcus Hummon, Monty Powell, Mike Noble) - 3:33
2. "Lonely Gypsy Wind" (Greg Barnhill, Jake Leiske, Angela Kelman, Shauna Rae Samograd) - 3:08
3. "Now That I'm On My Own" (Darrell Scott) - 3:27
4. "You Said" (Beth Nielsen Chapman) - 3:28
5. "Inclemency" (Barnhill, Leiske, Kelman, Samograd) - 3:55
6. "Ode to Billie Joe" (Bobbie Gentry) - 4:36
7. "Tall Drink of Water" (Zack Turner, Susan Longacre) - 3:19
8. "Walking Away for You" (Hummon) - 4:19
9. "This That and the Other Thing" (Spencer Bernard, Tim Norton) - 4:28
10. "What It's All About" (Barnhill, Leiske, Kelman, Samograd) - 3:38

== Chart performance ==
Chart (1996)	Peak position
Canadian RPM Country Albums	11
