= Thought I Was Dreaming =

Single by Lawnie Wallace

from the album Thought I Was Dreaming
- Released: 1996
- Genre: Country
- Length: 4:02
- Label: MCA
- Songwriters: Steve Earle; Greg Trooper
- Producer: J. K. Gulley

Lawnie Wallace singles chronology
"Little Lies, Big Trouble" (1995)	"Thought I Was Dreaming" (1996)	"A Fine Line" (1996)

"Thought I Was Dreaming" is a song recorded by Canadian country music artist Lawnie Wallace. It was released in 1996 as the second single from her debut album, Thought I Was Dreaming. The song peaked at number 8 on the RPM Country Tracks chart in June 1996.

== Chart performance ==
Chart (1996)	Peak position
Canada Country Singles (RPM)	8

=== Year-end charts ===
Chart (1996)	Position
Canada Country Tracks (RPM)	76
