= Lawnie Wallace =

Canadian country singer (born 1977)

- Born: April 15, 1977 (age 49)
- Origin: Stouffville, Ontario, Canada
- Genres: Country
- Occupations: Singer, songwriter
- Instrument: Vocals
- Years active: 1994–1996; 2015–present
- Label: MCA Canada
- Website: www.lawniewallace.com

Lawnie Wallace (born April 15, 1977) is a Canadian country singer. Wallace recorded one studio album for MCA Canada, Thought I Was Dreaming, in 1996. Four singles from the album charted on the RPM Country Tracks chart in Canada, including the number 8-peaking title track.

== Biography ==
Wallace was born in Stouffville, Ontario, Canada. At age seven she began performing and writing songs. At the age of fifteen Wallace signed a publishing deal with TMP Publishing, and an artist development deal with Warner Chappell. After relocating to Nashville she began co-writing songs.

Before the age of seventeen Wallace had signed a major record deal with MCA Records and began touring to promote her first album Thought I was Dreaming. Following this tour she took a break from the stage, working with students wanting to get into the Radio and TV business. In 2015 Wallace released her second album, The Lost Years, and has returned to performing live with her band The Chosen Ones.

== Discography ==
=== Albums ===
| Title | Album details |
|---|---|
| Thought I Was Dreaming | Release date: 1995; Label: MCA Canada |
| The Lost Years | Release date: 2015 |

=== Singles ===
| Year | Title | Peak positions | Album |
| Year | Title | CAN Country | Album |
|---|---|---|---|
| 1995 | "Little Lies, Big Trouble" | 57 | Thought I Was Dreaming |
| 1996 | "Thought I Was Dreaming" | 8 | Thought I Was Dreaming |
| 1996 | "A Fine Line" | 20 | Thought I Was Dreaming |
| 1996 | "The Heartache" | 46 | Thought I Was Dreaming |

=== Music videos ===
| Year | Title | Director |
|---|---|---|
| 1995 | "Little Lies, Big Trouble" | |
| 1996 | "Thought I Was Dreaming" | Paul Fox |
| 1996 | "The Heartache" | Margaret Malandruccolo |
