= Cloud of Dust =

Single by Rena Gaile

from the album Out on a Limb
- Released: 1996
- Genre: Country
- Length: 3:13
- Label: Rosedale
- Songwriters: Judy Rodman; Tom Damphier
- Producer: Declan O'Doherty

Rena Gaile singles chronology
"All She Wants" (1995)	"Cloud of Dust" (1996)	"The Hand That Rocked the Cradle" (1996)

"Cloud of Dust" is a song recorded by Canadian country music artist Rena Gaile. It was released in 1996 as the third single from her debut album, Out on a Limb. It peaked at number 10 on the RPM Country Tracks chart in July 1996.

The song was also recorded by Maureen McCormick on her 1995 album When You Get a Little Lonely.

== Chart performance ==
Chart (1996)	Peak position
Canada Country Singles (RPM)	10
