= James Bonamy =

American country singer

- Born: James Michael Bonamy; April 29, 1972 (age 53); Winter Park, Florida, U.S.
- Origin: Daytona Beach, Florida, U.S.
- Genres: Country
- Occupation: Singer
- Instruments: Vocals, guitar
- Years active: 1995–1997
- Label: Epic

James Michael Bonamy (born April 29, 1972) is an American pastor and former country music artist. He has released two studio albums (1996's What I Live to Do and 1997's Roots and Wings), both on the Epic Records Nashville label. These albums produced seven singles on the Billboard Hot Country Singles & Tracks (now Hot Country Songs) charts, of which the highest-peaking was "I Don't Think I Will" at number 2.

== Early life ==
Bonamy was born in Winter Park, Florida in 1972. Growing up around the beach as well as around dirt car-racing tracks near his home, he played outside linebacker and fullback in high school football. Bonamy's father was of Lebanese descent. He graduated from Mainland High School in Daytona Beach, Florida in 1990. After graduating in the fall of 1990, he followed his brother to the University of Alabama. He spent most of his first year sitting in the off-campus apartment he and his brother shared, playing guitar and trying to write country songs. After performing on a local radio show in Alabama, he quit school to work at a gift shop in Orlando, Florida. Later, he performed in a program called "Country Music USA" at the Opryland USA theme park in Nashville, Tennessee. Bonamy also competed on Star Search.

=== 1995–1996: What I Live to Do ===
In 1995, he was signed to Epic Records, and his debut album, What I Live to Do, was released in 1996 under the production of Doug Johnson. The first single, "Dog on a Toolbox," peaked at number 64 on the Hot Country Songs charts, having been withdrawn as a single because label staff thought that there were too many songs about dogs at the time. After this song was withdrawn, its original b-side, "She's Got a Mind of Her Own" was shipped as the second single. This song peaked at 26 on the country music charts, followed by the number 2 hit "I Don't Think I Will" and the number 27 "All I Do Is Love Her." At the 1997 Academy of Country Music Awards, Bonamy was nominated as Top New Male Vocalist, and TNN Music City News nominated him as Star of Tomorrow. In addition, he toured in 1997 with Emilio Navaira, Clay Walker and Terri Clark.

Dan Kuchar of Country Standard Time gave the album a mixed review, praising Bonamy's voice but criticizing the songwriting on most of the tracks and saying that the album did not have a distinctive sound.

=== 1997: Roots and Wings ===
A second album, Roots and Wings, followed in 1997. Its lead-off single "The Swing" was his last top 40 hit at number 31; the other two singles were "Naked to the Pain" and "Little Blue Dot", reaching numbers 65 and 63 respectively. Bonamy wrote the track "I Knew I'd Need My Heart Someday" with Johnson and Pat Bunch, and chose the title track (which was written by Skip Ewing and Bill Anderson and previously recorded by Doug Supernaw) at the suggestion of Epic's A&R director, Debbie Zavitson.

This album also received a mixed review from Country Standard Time, with Larry Stevens praising "Daddy Never Had a Chance in Hell" but criticizing the rest of the album for having a more pop-oriented sound. Thom Owens of Allmusic gave a three-star rating out of five, saying that he considered it an improvement over the debut.

== Personal life ==
Bonamy has not recorded an album since 1997. By 2002, he had moved to Cypress, Texas, where he worked at a communications company. He served full time as a Worship Pastor at Christ Fellowship in Palm Beach Gardens, Florida from 2010 to 2012. He is married to Amy Jane and has three sons, Daniel, Paul and Sal, and currently lives in Longview, Texas where he is a Pastor at his church home, Grace Creek Church.

== Discography ==
=== Albums ===
Title	Album details	Peak chart positions		
Title	Album details	US Country	US	US Heat
What I Live to Do	Release date: February 20, 1996; Label: Epic Records	16	112	1
Roots and Wings	Release date: June 24, 1997; Label: Epic Records	25	—	11
"—" denotes releases that did not chart

=== Singles ===
Year	Single	Peak chart positions		Album
Year	Single	US Country	CAN Country	Album
1995	"Dog on a Toolbox"	64	—	What I Live to Do
1996	"She's Got a Mind of Her Own"	26	20	What I Live to Do
1996	"I Don't Think I Will"	2	8	What I Live to Do
1996	"All I Do Is Love Her"	27	22	What I Live to Do
1997	"The Swing"	31	16	Roots and Wings
1997	"Naked to the Pain"	65	70	Roots and Wings
1997	"Little Blue Dot"	63	—	Roots and Wings
"—" denotes releases that did not chart

=== Music videos ===
Year	Video	Director
1995	"Dog on a Toolbox"	John Lloyd Miller
1996	"I Don't Think I Will"	Greg Crutcher
1996	"All I Do Is Love Her"	Michael Salomon
1997	"The Swing"	Chris Rogers
1997	"Naked to the Pain"	Chris Rogers

== Awards and nominations ==
Year	Organization	Award	Nominee/Work	Result
1997	Academy of Country Music Awards	Top New Male Vocalist	James Bonamy	Nominated
1998	TNN/Music City News Country Awards	Male Star of Tomorrow	James Bonamy	Nominated
