= Lonely Too Long =

- CD-Single cover

Single by Patty Loveless

from the album The Trouble with the Truth
- B-side: "Feelin' Good About Feelin' Bad"
- Released: August 24, 1996
- Recorded: September 1995
- Genre: Country
- Length: 4:34
- Label: Epic
- Songwriters: Mike Lawler; Bill Rice; Sharon Vaughn
- Producer: Emory Gordy Jr.

Patty Loveless singles chronology
"A Thousand Times a Day" (1996)	"Lonely Too Long" (1996)	"She Drew a Broken Heart" (1996)

"Lonely Too Long" is a song written by Bill Rice, Sharon Vaughn and Mike Lawler, and recorded by American country music artist Patty Loveless. It was released in August 1996 by Epic Records as the third single from her eighth album, The Trouble with the Truth (1996). It charted for 20 weeks on the US Billboard Hot Country Singles and Tracks chart, reaching No. 1 during the week of November 16, 1996. The song was originally recorded by Doug Stone, whose version was never released.

== Critical reception ==
Reviews of the song were positive. Larry Flick from Billboard magazine noted that Loveless' voice "exudes a variety of emotion on this well-written tune". Wendy Newcomer from Cash Box wrote, "Loveless' delicate explanation of "the morning after" is as inviting and seductive as the night before in 'Lonely Too Long'. Well good morning/Tell me how did you sleep last night/You're still smiling/So we must have done something right... With a voice as honest and forthcoming and Loveless', listeners will find it hard to turn her away."

== Charts ==
=== Weekly charts ===
Chart (1996)	Peak position
Canada Country Singles (RPM)	3
US Hot Country Songs (Billboard)	1

=== Year-end charts ===
Chart (1996)	Position
Canada Country Tracks (RPM)	67
US Hot Country Songs (Billboard)	63
