= The Swing (song) =

Single by James Bonamy

from the album Roots and Wings
- Released: March 24, 1997
- Genre: Country
- Length: 3:23
- Label: Epic
- Songwriters: Robert Ellis Orrall, Bob Regan
- Producer: Doug Johnson

James Bonamy singles chronology
| "All I Do Is Love Her" (1996) | "The Swing" (1997) | "Naked to the Pain" (1997) |

"The Swing" is a song written by Robert Ellis Orrall and Bob Regan, and recorded by American country music artist James Bonamy. It was released in March 1997 as the lead single from the album Roots and Wings. The song reached number 31 on the Billboard Hot Country Singles & Tracks chart and peaked at number 16 on the Canadian RPM Country Tracks chart.

== Music video ==
The music video was directed by chris rogers and premiered in March 1997. It was filmed in Charleston, South Carolina.

== Critical reception ==
Frank Roberts of The Virginian-Pilot called it a "clever novelty". David Simons of New Country magazine wrote that it was "a catchy boy-meets-girl fiddle stomper."

== Chart performance ==
"The Swing" debuted at number 72 on the U.S. Billboard Hot Country Singles & Tracks for the week of April 5, 1997

| Chart (1997) | Peak position |
|---|---|
| Canada Country Singles (RPM) | 16 |
| US Hot Country Songs (Billboard) | 31 |
