= What I Live to Do =

Studio album by James Bonamy
- Released: February 20, 1996
- Recorded: 1995
- Studio: Emerald Sound; Javelina; The Money Pit; Music Mill; Quad Studios; Recording Arts; Sound Stage; The Work Station; (Nashville, Tennessee)
- Genre: Country
- Length: 34:42
- Label: Epic
- Producer: Doug Johnson

James Bonamy chronology
What I Live to Do (1996)	Roots and Wings (1997)

What I Live to Do is the debut studio album by American country music artist James Bonamy. Released in February 1996, it includes the single "I Don't Think I Will", a number 2 hit on the U.S. Billboard Hot Country Singles & Tracks charts, and "She's Got a Mind of Her Own" and "All I Do Is Love Her". The first single, "Dog on a Toolbox", was withdrawn by the label and replaced with "She's Got a Mind of Her Own".

== Critical reception ==
Dan Kuchar of Country Standard Time gave a mixed review. He thought that Bonamy's singing voice had "power and flair", but criticized the songwriting of most songs other than "I Don't Think I Will" and "The Devil Goes Fishin'".

== Track listing ==
No.	Title	Writer(s)	Length
1.	"She's Got a Mind of Her Own"	Don Schlitz, Billy Livsey	3:27
2.	"I Don't Think I Will"	Doug Johnson	3:34
3.	"Dog on a Toolbox"	Monty Holmes, Gerry House	2:55
4.	"All I Do Is Love Her"	Skip Ewing, Wayland Patton	3:59
5.	"Brain in a Jar"	Bob McDill, Roger Murrah	3:27
6.	"The Couple"	Johnson	3:33
7.	"The Devil Goes Fishin'"	Pat Bunch, Johnson	3:41
8.	"Amy Jane"	Max T. Barnes, Leslie Satcher	3:27
9.	"Heartbreak School"	Ewing, Donny Kees	3:01
10.	"Jimmy and Jesus"	Dana Hunt Black, Danny Wells	3:38

== Personnel ==
- James Bonamy – lead vocals
- Joe Chemay – bass guitar
- Dan Dugmore – pedal steel guitar
- Larry Franklin – fiddle, mandolin
- Paul Franklin – pedal steel guitar
- Steve Gibson – acoustic guitar, electric guitar, mandolin
- John Hobbs – piano, electric piano, Hammond organ
- Dann Huff – electric guitar
- Carl Jackson – background vocals
- Michael Jones – background vocals
- Dan Kelly – fiddle
- Paul Leim – drums
- Brent Mason – electric guitar
- Terry McMillan – harmonica, percussion
- Blue Miller – background vocals
- Billy Joe Walker, Jr. – acoustic guitar
- John Willis – acoustic guitar

== Charts ==
=== Weekly charts ===
Chart (1996)	Peak position
US Billboard 200	112
US Top Country Albums (Billboard)	16
US Heatseekers Albums (Billboard)	1

=== Year-end charts ===
Chart (1996)	Position
US Top Country Albums (Billboard)	71
