= You Can Feel Bad =

Single by Patty Loveless

from the album The Trouble with the Truth
- Released: December 30, 1995
- Genre: Country
- Length: 3:24
- Label: Epic
- Songwriters: Matraca Berg, Tim Krekel
- Producer: Emory Gordy Jr.

Patty Loveless singles chronology
"Halfway Down" (1995)	"You Can Feel Bad" (1995)	"A Thousand Times a Day" (1996)

"You Can Feel Bad" is a song written by Matraca Berg and Tim Krekel, and recorded by American country music artist Patty Loveless. It was released in December 1995 as the first single from her eighth album, The Trouble with the Truth (1996). The song charted for 20 weeks on the Billboard Hot Country Singles and Tracks chart, reaching No. 1 during the week of March 23, 1996.

== Critical reception ==
Wendy Newcomer from Cash Box wrote, "Loveless’ new single from her upcoming album Trouble With The Truth is delivered with the elan of a great interpreter—loose, soulful and confident. Loveless is an artist who consistently records well-written songs with just the right amount of feisty attitude."

== Charts ==
=== Weekly charts ===
Chart (1995–1996)	Peak position
Canada Country Singles (RPM)	1
US Hot Country Songs (Billboard)	1

=== Year-end charts ===
Chart (1996)	Position
Canada Country Tracks (RPM)	69
US Hot Country Songs (Billboard)	8
