= Rena Gaile =

- Origin: London, Ontario, Canada
- Genres: Country
- Occupation: Singer
- Instrument(s): Vocals, guitar, flute
- Years active: 1983–present
- Labels: Royalty
- Website: renagaile.com

Rena Gaile is a Canadian country music artist. Gaile's first single, "Make Time for Love," was released in 1983. She released an additional seven singles between 1989 and 1993 before issuing her first studio album, Out on a Limb, in 1995. This album produced seven singles for her on the Canadian country music charts, of which the highest was the No. 10-peaking "Cloud of Dust."

Gaile was nominated for Outstanding New Artist at the RPM Big Country Awards in 1993 and 1996. She also received a nomination for Female Artist of the Year at the 1997 Canadian Country Music Association Awards.

Her second album, At Your Feet, was released in 2001. "Just as I Am" was named Southern Gospel Song of the Year at the 2001 CGMA Covenant Awards. A third album, One People, followed in 2004.

== Discography ==
=== Albums ===
Title	Details
Out on a Limb	Release date: 1995; Label: Rosedale Records
At Your Feet	Release date: 2001; Label: Acrobat Music
One People	Release date: 2004; Label: self-released

=== Singles ===
Year	Single	Peak chart positions		Album
Year	Single	CAN Country	CAN AC	Album
1983	"Make Time for Love"	—	—	Non-album songs
1989	"I Don't Love You Anymore"	77	—	Non-album songs
1990	"It's Always Love"	63	—	Non-album songs
1990	"Holding Out"	—	26	Non-album songs
1991	"Now I'm Home"	—	—	Non-album songs
1991	"Country Gold"	52	—	Non-album songs
1992	"Daddy's School"	32	—	Non-album songs
1993	"Let's Not Call It Love, Yet"	24	—	Non-album songs
1995	"Better Off Blue"	20	—	Out on a Limb
1995	"All She Wants"	18	—	Out on a Limb
1996	"Cloud of Dust"	10	—	Out on a Limb
1996	"The Hand That Rocked the Cradle"	79	—	Out on a Limb
1997	"Girl Thang"	44	—	Out on a Limb
1997	"I Know Myself Too Well"	66	—	Out on a Limb
1998	"Out on a Limb"	74	—	Out on a Limb
2001	"Just as I Am"	—	—	At Your Feet
"—" denotes releases that did not chart

=== Music videos ===
Year	Single
1995	"All She Wants"
1996	"Cloud of Dust"
1996	"The Hand That Rocked the Cradle"
1997	"I Know Myself Too Well"
