= You Said (song) =

Single by Farmer's Daughter

from the album Makin' Hay
- Released: 1997
- Genre: Country
- Length: 3:28
- Label: MCA
- Songwriter: Beth Nielsen Chapman
- Producer: Gerry Leiske

Farmer's Daughter singles chronology
"Now That I'm On My Own" (1997)	"You Said" (1997)	"Inclemency" (1998)

"You Said" is a song recorded by Canadian country music group Farmer's Daughter. It was released in 1997 as the fourth single from their second studio album, Makin' Hay. It peaked at number 8 on the RPM Country Tracks chart in November 1997.

== Chart performance ==
Chart (1997)	Peak position
Canada Country Singles (RPM)	8

=== Year-end charts ===
Chart (1997)	Position
Canada Country Tracks (RPM)	93
