= Cornfields or Cadillacs =

Single by Farmer's Daughter

from the album Makin' Hay
- Released: 1996
- Genre: Country
- Length: 3:33
- Label: Universal Music Canada
- Songwriters: Marcus Hummon; Monty Powell; Mike Noble
- Producer: Monroe Jones

Farmer's Daughter singles chronology
"Fallin' Outta Love" (1996)	"Cornfields or Cadillacs" (1996)	"Lonely Gypsy Wind" (1996)

"Cornfields or Cadillacs" is a single by Canadian country music band Farmer's Daughter. Released in 1996, it was the first single from their album Makin' Hay. The song reached #1 on the RPM Country Tracks chart in November 1996.

== Chart performance ==
Chart (1996)	Peak position
Canada Country Singles (RPM)	1

=== Year-end charts ===
Chart (1996)	Position
Canada Country Tracks (RPM)	25
