= Farmer's Daughter (band) =

Canadian country music group

- Origin: Vancouver, British Columbia, Canada
- Genre: Country
- Years active: 1993–2002
- Labels: Stubble Jumper Music; Universal Music Canada
- Past members: Jake Leiske; Angela Kelman; Shauna Rae Samograd; Shane Hendrickson

Farmer's Daughter was a Canadian country music group. Farmer's Daughter recorded three studio albums and charted sixteen singles on the Canadian country music charts. Their highest charting single was the number one song "Cornfields or Cadillacs".

== Career ==
In the spring of 1992, Saskatchewan's Jake Leiske talked Alberta's Shauna Rae Samograd into forming a country music group. Jake and Shauna Rae had toured together before with their family's gospel group when they were 5 and 2 years old, respectively. By the fall of that same year, they joined forces with Manitoba's Angela Kelman, to form Farmer's Daughter.

In 1993, the Vancouver-based group independently released their debut album, Girls Will Be Girls, on Stubble Jumper Music. The album generated seven hits, including "Borderline Angel", "Family Love", "I Wanna Hold You" and a cover of the Dusty Springfield hit "Son of a Preacher Man". Girls Will Be Girls was named Album of the Year by the British Columbia Country Music Association (BCCMA) in 1994, and the group won the Vista Rising Star Award from the Canadian Country Music Association (CCMA) the following year. They swept the 1996 British Columbia Country Music Awards, winning Entertainer of the Year, Group of the Year, as well as Song and Single of the Year awards for "Borderline Angel".

In 1996, Farmer's Daughter signed to Universal Music Canada and released their second album, Makin' Hay, in September. The album went gold in Canada and produced five more hit singles, including "Lonely Gypsy Wind", "Now That I'm On My Own", "You Said" and the top 5 "Cornfields or Cadillacs". They were named Group of the Year by the CCMA in 1997, Best Country Group or Duo at the Juno Awards in 1998, and both Group and Entertainer of the Year by the BCCMA in 1997 and 1998.

In 1997, at WWE's In Your House 16: Canadian Stampede, Farmer's Daughter performed the Canadian National Anthem prior to the Main Event.

Their third album, This Is the Life, was released in October 1998, also by UMG Canada. They took a more hands-on approach, producing the album with Marc Ramaer (k.d. lang). Two singles from the CD reached the Canadian Top 10, "Freeway" and "Blue Horizon". Farmer's Daughter continued their domination at the BCCMA Awards in 1999, winning Entertainer of the Year, Group of the Year, Song of the Year ("Blue Horizon"), Single of the Year ("Blue Horizon") and Album of the Year (This Is The Life).

The group released their greatest hits album, The Best of Farmer's Daughter, in 1999. The CD included 11 of Farmer's Daughter's biggest hits, along with two new songs, "Walkin' In The Sunshine" (#8) and "You And Only You" (#12). They were once again named Entertainer of the Year and Group of the Year by the BCCMA, along with Single of the Year for "Walkin' In The Sunshine".

The original three group members did their last tour in 2001, and did not go public with any information as to why they decided to stop playing together. All three women went on to work on solo projects and other personal goals. On June 16, 2008, Farmer's Daughter played an exclusive reunion show at the Winspear Center in Edmonton, Alberta, Canada.

In 2016, the group was inducted into the British Columbia Country Music Hall of Fame

== Discography ==
=== Studio albums ===
Title	Details	Peak positions	Certifications (sales thresholds)
Title	Details	CAN Country	Certifications (sales thresholds)
Girls Will Be Girls	Release date: December 6, 1993; Label: Stubble Jumper Music	16	
Makin' Hay	Release date: October 23, 1996; Label: Universal Music Canada	11	CAN: Gold
This Is the Life	Release date: October 6, 1998; Label: Universal Music Canada	—	
"—" denotes releases that did not chart

=== Compilation albums ===
Title	Details	Peak positions
Title	Details	CAN Country
The Best of Farmer's Daughter	Release date: 1999; Label: Universal Music Canada	15

=== Singles ===
Year	Single	Peak positions	Album
Year	Single	CAN Country	Album
1993	"Girls Will Be Girls"	82	Girls Will Be Girls
1994	"I Wanna Hold You"	50	Girls Will Be Girls
1994	"Family Love"	15	Girls Will Be Girls
1995	"Son of a Preacher Man"	32	Girls Will Be Girls
1995	"Borderline Angel"	27	Girls Will Be Girls
1995	"Callin' All You Cowboys"	43	Girls Will Be Girls
1996	"Fallin' Outta Love"	84	Girls Will Be Girls
1996	"Cornfields or Cadillacs"	1	Makin' Hay
1996	"Lonely Gypsy Wind"	15	Makin' Hay
1997	"Now That I'm On My Own"	10	Makin' Hay
1997	"You Said"	8	Makin' Hay
1998	"Inclemency"	28	Makin' Hay
1998	"Freeway"	15	This Is the Life
1999	"Blue Horizon"	6	This Is the Life
1999	"Let It Ride"	30	This Is the Life
1999	"Walkin' in the Sunshine"	7	The Best of Farmer's Daughter
2000	"You and Only You"	11	The Best of Farmer's Daughter
2005	"Your Good Girl's Gonna Go Bad"	—	single only
"—" denotes releases that did not chart

=== Music videos ===
Year	Video	Director
1994	"Family Love"	Tony Pantages
1995	"Borderline Angel"	Allan Jones
1995	"Son of a Preacher Man"	David Blood
1995	"Callin' All You Cowboys"	Allan Jones
1996	"Fallin' Outta Love"	Allan Jones
1996	"Cornfields or Cadillacs"	Tony Pantages
1996	"Lonely Gypsy Wind"	
1997	"Now That I'm On My Own"	
1998	"Inclemency"	
1998	"Freeway"	Adam Sliwinski
1999	"Blue Horizon"	
1999	"Walkin' in the Sunshine"	Terrance Odette
2000	"You and Only You"	Adam Sliwinski

== Awards ==
=== Canadian Country Music Awards ===
1995

- Vista Rising Star

1997

- Group or Duo of the Year

=== Juno Awards ===
1998

- Best Country Group or Duo

=== British Columbia Country Music Awards ===
1994

- Album of the Year, Girls Will Be Girls

1996

- Entertainer of the Year
- Group of the Year
- Song of the Year, "Borderline Angel"
- Single of the Year, "Borderline Angel"

1997

- Entertainer of the Year
- Group of the Year
- Single of the Year, "Cornfields or Cadillacs"

1998

- Entertainer of the Year
- Group of the Year

1999

- Entertainer of the Year
- Group of the Year
- Song of the Year, "Blue Horizon"
- Single of the Year, "Blue Horizon"
- Album of the Year, This Is the Life

2000

- Entertainer of the Year
- Group of the Year
- Single of the Year, "Walkin' In The Sunshine"

2002

- Group of the Year
