= Rachel Matkin =

- Genres: Country
- Occupation: Singer
- Instruments: Vocals, guitar, flute, autoharp
- Years active: 1995–present
- Labels: Cross Country Records; MCA Records
- Website: dirtroadopera.ca

Rachel Matkin is a Canadian country music artist. Matkin first began performing at the age of thirteen with her father and brothers in The Matkin Family Band. They opened for Ian Tyson, Dwight Yoakam, Patricia Conroy, Lisa Brokop, The Moffatts and Gary Fjellgaard. At age fourteen, she won the British Columbia Country Music Association (BCCMA) Junior Vocalist contest.

Matkin recorded one studio album for Cross Country Records, 1995's Living Beyond Our Dreams. This album produced five chart singles for her on the Canadian country music charts, of which the highest was the No. 18-peaking "So, So Long." At the 1996 BCCMA Awards, Living Beyond Our Dreams was named Album of the Year. Matkin also won the Ray McAuley Horizon Award. She caught the attention of MCA Records, who signed her to a distribution deal. At the 1997 Juno Awards, Matkin was nominated for Best Country Female Vocalist. Matkin is a member of the roots/country/Americana group Dirt Road Opera, based out of Kelowna, British Columbia.

== Discography ==
=== Albums ===
Title	Album details
Living Beyond Our Dreams	Release date: 1995; Label: Cross Country/MCA Canada

=== Singles ===
Year	Title	Peak positions	Album
Year	Title	CAN Country	Album
1995	"Over You Now"	43	Living Beyond Our Dreams
1996	"Living Beyond Our Dreams"	29	Living Beyond Our Dreams
1996	"Waiting for You"	90	Living Beyond Our Dreams
1996	"So, So Long"	18	Living Beyond Our Dreams
1997	"Over the Hardest Part"	44	Living Beyond Our Dreams
