= Gary Nicholson (singer) =

American singer-songwriter (born 1949)

- Born: November 7, 1949 (age 76); Commerce, Texas, U.S.
- Origin: Nashville, Tennessee, U.S.
- Genres: Country; Blues
- Occupations: Singer-songwriter record producer
- Instruments: Vocals, guitar
- Years active: 1970s–present

Gary Nicholson (born November 7, 1949) is an American singer-songwriter and record producer, known mainly for his work in country music and blues. He is a two-time Grammy winning producer and was inducted into the Texas Heritage Songwriter's Association Hall of Fame. Nicholson has more than 600 recordings and is best known for his work with Willie Nelson, Waylon Jennings, Garth Brooks, George Strait, Ringo Starr, B. B. King, Fleetwood Mac and Billy Joe Shaver.

== Early life and education ==
Nicholson was born in Commerce, Texas. He grew up in Garland, Texas, and began playing guitar in his teenage years in bands such as "The Valiants", "The Catalinas" and "The Untouchables". Afterward, Nicholson attended University of North Texas, majoring in music.

== Career ==
=== Early career ===
In 1970, Nicholson and his band drove to Los Angeles, California. The band won a talent contest at the Palomino Club and met musicians James Burton, Red Rhodes and Clarence White. Afterwards, he formed the bluegrass/folk trio, "The Whitehorse Brothers", playing in Southern California. The group expanded and became "Uncle Jim's Music" and was signed to MCA/Kapp records for two albums.

In 1973, Nicholson moved back to Texas and started the rock/country band "Hot Sauce". During this time, he first played with Delbert McClinton. His friend and bandmate, Jim Ed Norman, recorded Nicholson's song "Jukebox Argument", sung by Mickey Gilley in the film Urban Cowboy.

In 1980, Nicholson signed with Norman's Jensong Music and moved to Nashville, Tennessee. He played lead guitar for Guy Clark during the recording of the album Better Days. Mickey Gilley recorded Nicholson's songs "Your Love Shines Through" and "Ladies Night". During this time, he also played guitar for such artists as Billy Joe Shaver, Bobby Bare and Guy Clark.

In 1983, Nicholson signed a publishing contract with Tree Publishing (now Sony/ATV Music Publishing). He achieved his first number 1 hit in 1984 with the song "That's the Thing About Love", recorded by Don Williams and "The Power of Love", recorded by Charley Pride. He co-wrote a song for Waylon Jennings called "Working Without a Net" in 1986. Also that year, he wrote six songs for T. Graham Brown's debut album and in 1987 the title and five others on his second release, Brilliant Conversationalist.

He penned a number 1 hit in 1993 with "One More Last Chance" recorded and co-written by Vince Gill. In 1995, Nicholson co-wrote six songs with John Prine for his album, Lost Dogs and Mixed Blessings. He received ASCAP Awards in 1997 for the songs, "Givin' Water to a Drowning Man", by Lee Roy Parnell, and "A Thousand Times a Day", by Patty Loveless. Nicholson also left Sony/ATV Music Publishing to start his own publishing company, Gary Nicholson Music ASCAP, during this time. In 1998, Nicholson wrote the album title and single "Trouble with the Truth" by Patty Loveless. In 1999, his song "Live, Laugh, Love" was the album title and single for Clay Walker.

=== Later career ===
In 2001, his song "She Couldn't Change Me" by Montgomery Gentry reached number two on Billboard Hot Country Songs. In 2002, Nicholson's song "Squeeze Me In" became a hit duet for Garth Brooks and Trisha Yearwood. He also charted for the singles, "When Love Gets Ahold of You" by Reba McEntire, "Back in Your Arms Again" by The Mavericks and "The Reason Why" by Vince Gill. In 2003, he co-wrote the single "Never Without You" with Ringo Starr and has collaborated on each of his last five records. In 2008, Nicholson co-wrote the title song, "Skin Deep", for Buddy Guy, which was number one on the Billboard Blues Chart and Grammy nominated. He co-wrote "The Git Go" with Billy Joe Shaver for Willie Nelson's Band of Brothers album, and co-wrote "It Ain't You" with Waylon Jennings, as a Ray Benson/Willie Nelson duet.

Nicholson has more than 600 recordings of his songs during his career. He has co-written songs with many notable songwriters and artists including Ringo Starr, Stevie Nicks, Neil Diamond, Vince Gill, Los Lonely Boys, Jimmy Webb, Michael McDonald, Brad Paisley, among others.

=== Production ===
During his career, Nicholson has produced five projects for Delbert McClinton, winning Grammys in the Best Contemporary Blues category for the albums "Nothing Personal" in 2001 and "Cost of Living" in 2005. Nicholson has also produced for Billy Joe Shaver, The Judds, Wynonna, Pam Tillis, T. Graham Brown and Marcia Ball.

== Awards and recognition ==
He was inducted to the Nashville Songwriters Hall of Fame in 2022, and inducted into Texas Heritage Songwriter's Association Hall of Fame in 2011. He has received ASCAP Awards for the songs, "Giving Water to a Drowning Man" and "A Thousand Times a Day".

== Personal life ==
On June 30, 1973, Nicholson married Barbara Ellendorff. He is from Garland, Texas, and has lived in Nashville, Tennessee, since 1980.

== Discography ==
=== Albums ===
Year	Album	Label
1971	Uncle Jim's Music – Uncle Jim	Kapp Records
1972	Uncle Jim's Music – There's A Song in This	Kapp Records
2000	Gary Nicholson – The Sky Is Not the Limit	Ardeo Records
2000	Fortunate Sons – Fortunate Sons	Fortune Records
2008	Whitey Johnson – Whitey Johnson	Slow Moving Records
2010	Gary Nicholson – Nashville Songbook	Four Sons Recordings
2011	Gary Nicholson – Texas Songbook	Bismeaux Records
2019	Gary Nicholson – The Great Divide	Blue Corn Music
2024	Gary Nicholson – Common Sense	Qualified Music

=== Songs in film ===
Film	Song	Artist
Urban Cowboy	"Jukebox Argument"	Mickey Gilley
Message in a Bottle	"Beyond The Blue"	Beth Nielsen Chapman
Happy Texas	"Are You Happy Baby"	Lee Roy Parnell
Where the Heart Is	"Beyond The Blue"	Emmylou Harris/Patty Griffin
Crazy Heart	"Fallin and Flyin"	Jeff Bridges
