= Strait Out of the Box =

Box set by George Strait
- Released: September 12, 1995
- Recorded: June 1976 – April 10, 1995
- Genre: Neotraditional country; honky-tonk; Western swing
- Length: Disc 1 - 51:42; Disc 2 - 53:12; Disc 3 - 59:25; Disc 4 - 52:56; Total - 3:37:15
- Label: MCA
- Producer: George Strait, Phil Ramone, Blake Mevis, Don Daily, Hank Cattaneo, Tony Brown, Jimmy Bowen, Ray Benson, Ray Baker, Joe Barnhill

George Strait chronology
Lead On (1994)	Strait Out of the Box (1995)	Blue Clear Sky (1996)

Singles from Strait Out of the Box
- 1. "Check Yes or No" Released: September 11, 1995; 2. "I Know She Still Loves Me" Released: December 11, 1995

Professional ratings
Review scores
Source	Rating
Allmusic	5/5 stars
Entertainment Weekly	A−
Los Angeles Times	2.5/4 stars

Strait Out of the Box (retroactively known as Strait Out of the Box: Part 1) is the first box set album by American country music artist George Strait. It contains four albums' worth of music, dating from 1976 to 1995. It mainly consists of Strait's singles, except for a select few that he decided to exclude. They were replaced by his choice of album cuts and several studio outtakes. It also contains his three singles recorded in the 1970s for indie label D Records, one of which, "I Just Can't Go on Dying Like This", was re-recorded for Strait's 2013 album Love Is Everything.

"Check Yes or No" and "I Know She Still Loves Me" were both released from this set as singles. Respectively, they reached number 1 and number 5 on the Billboard country charts.

The album was certified 8× platinum by the RIAA on July 29, 2003, indicating shipment of 2 million copies. This made the album at the time the best-performing country music box set of all time, and it was second only to the Live 1975–85 box set by Bruce Springsteen and the E Street Band overall. It had sold 1,525,100 copies in the United States as of October 2019.

== Track listing ==
Disc one (1981–1983)
No.	Title	Writer(s)	Length
1.	"I Just Can't Go On Dying Like This" (recorded in June 1976 in Ray Doggett Studio, Houston, Texas)	Clive Fuentes	2:46
2.	"(That Don't Change) The Way I Feel About You" (recorded in May 1978 in Soundmaster Studio, Houston, Texas)	Strait	2:11
3.	"I Don't Want to Talk It Over Anymore" (recorded in April 1979 in Soundmaster Studio, Houston, Texas)	Strait	3:11
4.	"Unwound"	Dean Dillon, Frank Dycus	2:26
5.	"Blame It on Mexico"	Darryl Staedler	2:51
6.	"Her Goodbye Hit Me in the Heart"	Dillon, Dycus	3:05
7.	"If You're Thinking You Want a Stranger (There's One Coming Home)"	Blake Mevis, David Wills	2:58
8.	"Any Old Love Won't Do" (recorded in February 23, 1982, in Music City Music Hall, Nashville, Tennessee)	Dillon, Dycus	3:04
9.	"Fool Hearted Memory"	Byron Hill, Mevis	2:39
10.	"Marina del Rey"	Dillon, Dycus	3:03
11.	"I Can't See Texas from Here"	Strait	2:30
12.	"Heartbroke"	Guy Clark	3:34
13.	"What Would Your Memories Do"	Hank Cochran, Dillon	3:18
14.	"Amarillo by Morning"	Terry Stafford, Paul Fraser	2:53
15.	"I Thought I Heard You Calling My Name" (recorded in March 29, 1983, in Music City Hall, Nashville, Tennessee)	Lee Emerson	2:45
16.	"A Fire I Can't Put Out"	Staedtler	3:00
17.	"You Look So Good in Love"	Glen Ballard, Rory Bourke, Kerry Chater	3:13
18.	"80 Proof Bottle of Tear Stopper"	Staedtler	2:15

Disc two (1983–1988)
No.	Title	Writer(s)	Length
1.	"Right or Wrong"	Paul Biese, Haven Gillespie, Arthur L. Sizemore	2:06
2.	"Let's Fall to Pieces Together"	Dickey Lee, Tommy Rocco, Johnny Russell	2:55
3.	"Does Fort Worth Ever Cross Your Mind"	Sanger D. Shafer, Darlene Shafer	3:15
4.	"The Cowboy Rides Away"	Sonny Throckmorton, Casey Kelly	3:23
5.	"The Fireman"	Mack Vickery, Wayne Kemp	2:35
6.	"The Chair"	Cochran, Dillon	2:50
7.	"You're Something Special to Me"	David Anthony	3:20
8.	"Haven't You Heard"	Red Lane, Kemp	2:55
9.	"In Too Deep"	Jerry Max Lane, Erv Woolsey	2:38
10.	"Lefty's Gone"	S. D. Shafer	3:15
11.	"Nobody in His Right Mind Would've Left Her"	Dillon	2:51
12.	"It Ain't Cool to Be Crazy About You"	Dillon, Royce Porter	2:51
13.	"Ocean Front Property"	Dillon, Cochran, Porter	3:07
14.	"Rhythm of the Road"	Dan McCoy	2:17
15.	"Six Pack to Go" (duet with Hank Thompson)	Dick Hart, Johnny Lowe, Hank Thompson	3:02
16.	"All My Ex's Live in Texas"	S. D. Shafer, Lyndia J. Shafer	3:20
17.	"Am I Blue"	David Chamberlain	3:06
18.	"Famous Last Words of a Fool"	Dillon, Rex Huston	3:26

Disc three (1988–1992)
No.	Title	Writer(s)	Length
1.	"Baby Blue"	Barker	3:34
2.	"If You Ain't Lovin' (You Ain't Livin')"	Tommy Collins	2:20
3.	"Baby's Gotten Good at Goodbye"	Tony Martin, Troy Martin	3:30
4.	"Bigger Man Than Me"	Curtis Wayne	2:51
5.	"Hollywood Squares"	Larry Cordle, Wayland Patton, Jeff Tanguay	2:43
6.	"What's Going On in Your World"	David Chamberlain, Porter, Red Steagall	3:28
7.	"Ace in the Hole"	Dennis Adkins	2:38
8.	"Love Without End, Amen"	Barker	3:07
9.	"Drinking Champagne"	Bill Mack	3:35
10.	"I've Come to Expect It from You"	Buddy Cannon, Dillon	3:45
11.	"If I Know Me"	Pam Belford, Dillon	2:42
12.	"You Know Me Better Than That"	Anna Lisa Graham, Tony Haselden	3:03
13.	"The Chill of an Early Fall"	Green Daniel, Gretchen Peters	3:32
14.	"Lovesick Blues"	Cliff Friend, Irving Mills	2:57
15.	"Milk Cow Blues"	Kokomo Arnold	5:12
16.	"Gone as a Girl Can Get"	Jerry Max Lane	3:16
17.	"So Much Like My Dad"	Chips Moman, Buddy Emmons	3:26
18.	"Trains Make Me Lonesome"	Paul Overstreet, Thom Schuyler	3:46

Disc four (1992–1995)
No.	Title	Writer(s)	Length
1.	"Wonderland of Love"	Wayne	2:56
2.	"I Cross My Heart"	Steve Dorff, Eric Kaz	3:31
3.	"Heartland"	Dorff, John Bettis	2:18
4.	"When Did You Stop Loving Me"	Donny Kees, Monty Holmes	2:50
5.	"Overnight Male"	Richard Fagan, Kim Williams, Ron Harbin	2:36
6.	"The King of Broken Hearts"	Jim Lauderdale	3:09
7.	"Where the Sidewalk Ends"	Lauderdale, John Leventhal	3:10
8.	"Easy Come, Easy Go"	Barker, Dillon	3:05
9.	"I'd Like to Have That One Back"	Barker, Bill Shore, Rick West	3:52
10.	"Lovebug"	Kemp, Wayne	2:51
11.	"The Man in Love with You"	Dorff, Gary Harju	3:23
12.	"Just Look at Me"	Gerald Smith, Wayne	3:10
13.	"Stay out of My Arms"	Lauderdale	2:36
14.	"Big Ball's in Cowtown" (features Asleep at the Wheel)	Hoyle Nix	2:42
15.	"The Big One"	Gerry House, Devon O'Day	2:10
16.	"Fly Me to the Moon" (duet with Frank Sinatra)	Bart Howard	2:10
17.	"Check Yes or No"	Dana Hunt Black, Danny Wells	3:20
18.	"I Know She Still Loves Me"	Barker, Holmes	3:07

== Personnel ==
- Tim Alexander – piano on "Big Ball's in Cowtown"
- David Anthony – acoustic guitar
- Ron Anthony – acoustic guitar
- Joe Barnhill – acoustic guitar
- Eddie Bayers – drums
- Richard Bennett – acoustic guitar
- Ray Benson – acoustic guitar and background vocals on "Big Ball's in Cowtown"
- Chuck Berghofer – upright bass
- Matt Betton – drums
- George Binkley III – strings
- Pete Bordonali – electric guitar
- John David Boyle – strings
- Clyde Brooks – drums
- Ronnie Brooks – acoustic guitar
- Larry Byrom – electric guitar
- Sandra Callaway – background vocals
- Buddy Cannon – background vocals
- Jimmy Capps – acoustic guitar
- Jerry Carrigan – drums
- Cindy Cashdollar – steel guitar on "Big Ball's in Cowtown"
- Marcy Cates – background vocals
- Margie Cates – background vocals
- Marvin Chantry – strings
- Steve Chapman – acoustic guitar
- Joe Chemay – bass guitar
- Gene Chrisman – drums
- Roy Christenson – strings
- Virginia Christenson – strings
- Doug Clements – background vocals
- Mike Daily – steel guitar
- Hank DeVito – steel guitar
- Floyd Domino – piano
- Steve Dorff – conductor, string arrangements
- Glen Duncan – fiddle
- Stuart Duncan – fiddle
- Gene Elders – fiddle
- Buddy Emmons – steel guitar
- Mark Feldman – fiddle
- Gregg Field – drums
- Rito Figlio – background vocals
- Phil Fisher – drums
- Pat Flynn – acoustic guitar
- Tom Foote – drums
- Michael Francis – saxophone
- Paul Franklin – steel guitar, dobro
- Gregg Galbraith – acoustic guitar, electric guitar
- Sonny Garrish – dobro, steel guitar
- Bob Golette – drums
- Steve Gibson – acoustic guitar, electric guitar, hi-string acoustic guitar
- Johnny Gimble – fiddle, mandolin
- Emory Gordy Jr. – bass guitar
- Carl Gorodetzky – strings
- Ruben Gosfeld – steel guitar
- Lennie Haight – strings
- Rob Hajacos – fiddle
- Owen Hale – drums
- Terry Hale – bass guitar
- Arlene Harden – background vocals
- Bobby Harden – background vocals
- Hoot Hester – fiddle
- John Hobbs – keyboards
- Jim Horn – saxophone
- Ronnie Huckaby – piano
- Sherilyn Huffman – background vocals
- John Hughey – steel guitar
- Mitch Humphries – keyboards
- David Hungate – bass guitar
- Leo Jackson – acoustic guitar, electric guitar
- John Barlow Jarvis – piano
- Gwen Kay – background vocals
- Dave Kirby – acoustic guitar
- Jerry Kroon – drums
- Mike Leech – bass guitar
- Larrie Londin – drums
- Benny McArthur – electric guitar
- Randy McCormick – piano
- Wade McCurdy – background vocals
- Rick McRae – electric guitar
- Bill Mabry – fiddle
- Liana Manis – background vocals
- Steve Marsh – saxophone
- Brent Mason – acoustic guitar, electric guitar
- Bill Miller – piano
- David Miller – bass guitar on "Big Ball's in Cowtown"
- Dennis Molchan – strings
- Alan Moore – string arrangements
- Bob Moore – upright bass
- Weldon Myrick – steel guitar
- Nashville String Machine – strings
- Steve Nathan – piano, organ, synthesizer
- Fred Newell – electric guitar
- Jody Nix – background vocals on "Big Ball's in Cowtown"
- Louis Dean Nunley – background vocals
- Mark O'Connor – fiddle
- Gary Van Osdale – strings
- Pamela Van Osdale – strings
- Larry Paxton – bass guitar
- Leon Rhodes – bass guitar
- Hargus "Pig" Robbins – keyboards
- Judy Rodman – background vocals
- Matt Rollings – piano
- Jack Ross – bass guitar
- Brent Rowan – electric guitar
- David Sanger – drums on "Big Ball's in Cowtown"
- Walter Schwede – strings
- Randy Scruggs – acoustic guitar
- Eldon Shamblin – electric guitar on "Big Ball's in Cowtown"
- Donna Sheridan – background vocals
- Jerry Shook – acoustic guitar
- Frank Sinatra – vocals on "Fly Me to the Moon"
- Leland Sklar – bass guitar
- Buddy Spicher – fiddle
- Harry Stinson – background vocals
- George Strait – acoustic guitar, lead vocals, background vocals
- Henry Strzelecki – bass guitar
- Donald Teal – strings
- Bobby Thompson – acoustic guitar
- Hank Thompson – vocals on "Six Pack to Go"
- Diane Tidwell – background vocals
- Ricky Turpin – fiddle and mandolin on "Big Ball's in Cowtown"
- Billy Joe Walker Jr. – electric guitar
- Jamie Whiting – keyboards
- Patrick Williams – conductor
- Bobby Wood – keyboards
- Stephanie Woolf – strings
- Glenn Worf – bass guitar
- Paul Yandell – acoustic guitar, electric guitar
- Chip Young – electric guitar
- Curtis Young – background vocals
- Reggie Young – electric guitar
- Andrea Zonn – background vocals

== Charts ==
=== Weekly charts ===
Chart (1995)	Peak position
Canadian Country Albums (RPM)	7
US Billboard 200	43
US Top Country Albums (Billboard)	9

=== Year-end charts ===
Chart (1995)	Position
US Top Country Albums (Billboard)	75
Chart (1996)	Position
US Billboard 200	142
US Top Country Albums (Billboard)	16
Chart (1997)	Position
US Top Country Albums (Billboard)	55
Chart (2019)	Position
US Top Country Albums (Billboard)	82
Chart (2020)	Position
US Top Country Albums (Billboard)	89
Chart (2021)	Position
US Top Country Albums (Billboard)	43

== Certifications ==
Certifications for Strait Out of the Box
Region	Certification	Certified units/sales
United States (RIAA)	8× Platinum	2,000,000^{^}
^{^} Shipments figures based on certification alone.
