= List of RPM number-one country singles of 1996 =

These are the Canadian number-one country songs of 1996, per the RPM Country Tracks chart.

Issue date	Title	Artist	Source
January 8	(If You're Not in It for Love) I'm Outta Here!	Shania Twain	
January 15	(If You're Not in It for Love) I'm Outta Here!	Shania Twain	
January 22	(If You're Not in It for Love) I'm Outta Here!	Shania Twain	
January 29	(If You're Not in It for Love) I'm Outta Here!	Shania Twain	
February 5	(If You're Not in It for Love) I'm Outta Here!	Shania Twain	
February 12	(If You're Not in It for Love) I'm Outta Here!	Shania Twain	
February 19	Bigger Than the Beatles	Joe Diffie	
February 26	Like There Ain't No Yesterday	Blackhawk	
March 4	Tell Me Something I Don't Know	Charlie Major	
March 11	The Beaches of Cheyenne	Garth Brooks	
March 18	Candle	Jason McCoy	
March 25	You Can Feel Bad	Patty Loveless	
April 1	No News	Lonestar	
April 8	You Win My Love	Shania Twain	
April 15	You Win My Love	Shania Twain	
April 22	You Win My Love	Shania Twain	
April 29	My Heart Has a History	Paul Brandt	
May 6	My Heart Has a History	Paul Brandt	
May 13	It's Lonely I Can't Stand	Charlie Major	
May 20	My Maria	Brooks & Dunn	
May 27	My Maria	Brooks & Dunn	
June 3	If I Were You	Terri Clark	
June 10	Blue Clear Sky	George Strait	
June 17	Blue Clear Sky	George Strait	
June 24	Time Marches On	Tracy Lawrence	
July 1	High Lonesome Sound	Vince Gill	
July 8	Anita Got Married	Duane Steele	
July 15	No One Needs to Know	Shania Twain	
July 22	No One Needs to Know	Shania Twain	
July 29	Blue	LeAnn Rimes	
August 5	Blue	LeAnn Rimes	
August 12	Sure Enough	Chris Cummings	
August 19	Nobody's Girl	Michelle Wright	
August 26	I Do	Paul Brandt	
September 2	I Do	Paul Brandt	
September 9	Guys Do It All the Time	Mindy McCready	
September 16	Guys Do It All the Time	Mindy McCready	
September 23	So Much for Pretending	Bryan White	
September 30	Living in a Moment	Ty Herndon	
October 7	Living in a Moment	Ty Herndon	
October 14	You Can't Lose Me	Faith Hill	
October 21	Believe Me Baby (I Lied)	Trisha Yearwood	
October 28	Like the Rain	Clint Black	(Note: October 28 chart is missing from the chart archives; this position is determined from the "last week" column on the November 4 chart.)
November 4	Like the Rain	Clint Black	
November 11	Unbelievable Love	Prairie Oyster	
November 18	Cornfields or Cadillacs	Farmer's Daughter	
November 25	Strawberry Wine	Deana Carter	
December 2	The Fear of Being Alone	Reba McEntire	
December 9	Poor Poor Pitiful Me	Terri Clark	
December 16	Crank My Tractor	Michelle Wright	

== See also ==
- 1996 in music
- List of number-one country hits of 1996 (U.S.)
