= Blue Clear Sky =

1996 studio album by George Strait

Studio album by George Strait
- Released: April 23, 1996
- Recorded: September 1995
- Studio: Emerald Studios and Masterfonics (Nashville, Tennessee)
- Genre: Neotraditional country
- Length: 35:48 (U.S Version); 39:08 (U.K. Version)
- Label: MCA
- Producer: Tony Brown; George Strait

George Strait chronology
Strait Out of the Box (1995)	Blue Clear Sky (1996)	Carrying Your Love with Me (1997)

Singles from Blue Clear Sky
- 1. "Blue Clear Sky" Released: March 25, 1996; 2. "Carried Away" Released: June 3, 1996; 3. "I Can Still Make Cheyenne" Released: August 26, 1996; 4. "King of the Mountain" Released: December 16, 1996

Professional ratings
Review scores
Source	Rating
Allmusic	4.5/5 stars
Chicago Tribune	link
Entertainment Weekly	A link
Q	link

Blue Clear Sky is the sixteenth studio album by American country music artist George Strait, released on April 23, 1996. The album was certified 3× Multi-Platinum in the U.S. for sales of three million copies, the album produced four singles. The title track, "Carried Away", "I Can Still Make Cheyenne", and "King of the Mountain".

== Track listing ==
No.	Title	Writer(s)	Length
1.	"Blue Clear Sky"	Bob DiPiero, John Jarrard, Mark D. Sanders	2:52
2.	"Carried Away"	Steve Bogard, Jeff Stevens	3:19
3.	"Rockin' in the Arms of Your Memory"	Dean Dillon, Norro Wilson	4:16
4.	"She Knows When You're on My Mind"	Wayne Kemp, Mack Vickery	3:15
5.	"I Ain't Never Seen No One Like You"	Bruce Bouton, Mark Chesnutt, Roger Springer	3:13
6.	"I Can Still Make Cheyenne"	Aaron Barker, Erv Woolsey	4:15
7.	"King of the Mountain"	Larry Boone, Paul Nelson	3:28
8.	"Do the Right Thing"	Jim Lauderdale, Gary Nicholson	3:07
9.	"I'd Just as Soon Go"	Barker, Dillon	3:14
10.	"Need I Say More"	Clay Blaker, Roger Brown	4:50
11.	"Check Yes or No" (Bonus Track On UK Version Only)	Danny Wells, Dana Hunt Black	3:20

== Personnel ==
- George Strait – lead vocals, acoustic guitar
- Matt Rollings – acoustic piano, Wurlitzer electric piano
- Biff Watson – Wurlitzer electric piano, acoustic guitar
- Steve Gibson – acoustic guitar, electric guitars, gut-string guitar
- Brent Mason – electric guitars, gut-string guitar
- Paul Franklin – steel guitar
- Glenn Worf – bass guitar
- Eddie Bayers – drums
- Farrell Morris – vibraphone
- Stuart Duncan – fiddle
- Liana Manis – backing vocals
- Curtis Young – backing vocals

=== Production ===
- Tony Brown – producer
- George Strait – producer
- Steve Tillisch – recording
- Brian Hardin – second engineer
- Chuck Ainlay – mixing
- Graham Lewis – mix assistant
- Don Cobb – digital editing
- Carlos Grier – digital editing
- Denny Purcell – mastering
- Georgetown Masters (Nashville, Tennessee) – editing and mastering location
- Jessie Noble – project coordinator
- Virginia Team – art direction, additional photography
- Jerry Joyner – design
- Mark Tucker – photography

== Charts ==
=== Weekly charts ===
Chart (1996)	Peak position
Canadian Albums (RPM)	49
Canadian Country Albums (RPM)	3
US Billboard 200	7
US Top Country Albums (Billboard)	1

=== Year-end charts ===
Chart (1996)	Position
US Billboard 200	40
US Top Country Albums (Billboard)	7
Chart (1997)	Position
US Billboard 200	130
US Top Country Albums (Billboard)	13

== Certifications ==
Certifications for Blue Clear Sky
Region	Certification	Certified units/sales
Canada (Music Canada)	Gold	50,000^{^}
United States (RIAA)	3× Platinum	3,000,000^{^}
^{^} Shipments figures based on certification alone.
