= Easy Come Easy Go (George Strait album) =

Studio album by George Strait
- Released: September 28, 1993
- Recorded: April 1993
- Studio: Sound Stage Studios and Masterfonics (Nashville, Tennessee); O'Henry Sound Studios (Burbank, California)
- Genre: Neotraditional country; honky-tonk
- Length: 31:32
- Label: MCA
- Producer: Tony Brown; George Strait

George Strait chronology
| Pure Country (1992) | Easy Come Easy Go (1993) | Lead On (1994) |

Singles from Easy Come Easy Go
- 1. "Easy Come, Easy Go" Released: August 9, 1993; 2. "I'd Like to Have That One Back" Released: November 29, 1993; 3. "Lovebug" Released: February 28, 1994; 4. "The Man in Love with You" Released: June 14, 1994

Professional ratings
Review scores
| Source | Rating |
|---|---|
| Allmusic | 4/5 stars |
| Chicago Tribune | 3.5/4 stars |
| Entertainment Weekly | B− |

Easy Come Easy Go is the fourteenth studio album by American country music artist George Strait. It was released by MCA Records and it produced four singles for Strait on the Hot Country Songs charts: the title track (#1), a cover of George Jones' 1965 hit "Lovebug" (#8), "I'd Like to Have That One Back" (#3), and "The Man in Love with You" (#5).

Barbra Streisand covered "We Must Be Loving Right" on her 1999 album A Love Like Ours.

== Track listing ==
| No. | Title | Writer(s) | Length |
|---|---|---|---|
| 1. | "Stay Out of My Arms" | Jim Lauderdale | 2:35 |
| 2. | "Just Look at Me" | Gerald Smith, Curtis Wayne | 3:08 |
| 3. | "Easy Come, Easy Go" | Aaron Barker, Dean Dillon | 3:02 |
| 4. | "I'd Like to Have That One Back" | Barker, Bill Shore, Rick West | 3:51 |
| 5. | "Lovebug" | Wayne Kemp, Wayne | 2:50 |
| 6. | "I Wasn't Fooling Around" | Lauderdale, John Leventhal | 3:00 |
| 7. | "Without Me Around" | Dillon, John Northrup | 3:26 |
| 8. | "The Man in Love with You" | Steve Dorff, Gary Harju | 3:22 |
| 9. | "That's Where My Baby Feels at Home" | Kemp, Wayne, Faron Young | 2:44 |
| 10. | "We Must Be Loving Right" | Clay Blaker, Roger Brown | 3:34 |

== Personnel ==
As listed in liner notes.

- George Strait – lead vocals
- Matt Rollings – pianos
- Steve Gibson – acoustic guitar, electric guitars, hi-string acoustic guitar
- Brent Mason – acoustic guitar, electric guitars
- Paul Franklin – steel guitar
- Glenn Worf – bass guitar, tic tac bass
- Eddie Bayers – drums
- Stuart Duncan – fiddle
- Steve Dorff – string arrangements (7, 8, 10)
- Liana Manis – backing vocals
- Curtis Young – backing vocals

=== Production ===
- Tony Brown – producer
- George Strait – producer
- Chuck Ainlay – recording, mixing, mastering
- Graham Lewis – sound engineer
- John Thomas II – sound engineer
- Craig White – sound engineer (6)
- Glenn Meadows – mastering
- Jessie Noble – project coordinator
- Jim Kemp – art direction
- Carmelo Roman – art direction, design
- Keith Carter – photography

== Charts ==
=== Weekly charts ===
| Chart (1993) | Peak position |
|---|---|
| Canadian Country Albums (RPM) | 2 |
| US Billboard 200 | 5 |
| US Top Country Albums (Billboard) | 2 |

=== Year-end charts ===
| Chart (1993) | Position |
|---|---|
| US Top Country Albums (Billboard) | 34 |

| Chart (1994) | Position |
|---|---|
| US Billboard 200 | 76 |
| US Top Country Albums (Billboard) | 10 |

== Certifications ==
Certifications for Easy Come Easy Go
| Region | Certification | Certified units/sales |
|---|---|---|
| Canada (Music Canada) | Gold | 50,000^{^} |
| United States (RIAA) | 2× Platinum | 2,000,000^{^} |
^{^} Shipments figures based on certification alone.
