= New Country Hits =

Studio album by George Jones
- Released: July 1965
- Recorded: 1965
- Genre: Country
- Length: 30:08
- Label: Musicor
- Producer: Pappy Daily

George Jones chronology
Mr. Country & Western Music (1965)	New Country Hits (1965)	Old Brush Arbors (1965)

Singles from New Country Hits
- 1. "Things Have Gone to Pieces" Released: March 13, 1965; 2. "Love Bug" Released: August 23, 1965; 3. "Take Me" Released: September 21, 1965

New Country Hits is an album by American country music artist George Jones. It was released in 1965 on the Musicor Records label.

== Reception ==
Professional ratings
Review scores
Source	Rating
Allmusic	4/5 stars

Upon release, New Country Hits rose to number 5 on the country music album chart. Critic Eugene Chadbourne of AllMusic writes that "the slightly strained, bluegrass-influenced high-end vocals are here, along with overwhelming dips into the baritone end and phrasing that rivals that of jazz singer Billie Holiday's" and adds that "the musicians sound wonderful here, creating a sentimental old-time country sound when necessary in the devastating "I'm Wasting Good Paper" or delivering the type of twangy honky-tonk country fans associate with Bakersfield..."

== Track listing ==
1. "Love Bug" (Wayne Kemp, Curtis Wayne) – 2:03
2. "Till I Hear from You" (Jones, Jack Ripley) – 2:26
3. "I Made Her That Way" (Jones, Dale Ward) – 2:24
4. "I'm Wasting Good Paper" (Earl Montgomery) – 2:29
5. "Along Came You" (Jones, Kemp, Jack Rich) – 2:30
6. "I'd Rather Switch Than Fight" (Kemp) – 2:05
7. "Things Have Gone to Pieces" (Leon Payne) – 2:52
8. "If You Won't Tell on Me" (Dallas Frazier) – 2:35
9. "Memory is a Flower" (Jones, Jimmy Day) – 2:59
10. "Feeling Single - Seeing Double" (Kemp) – 2:07
11. "We're Watching Our Step" (E. Montgomery, Melba Montgomery) – 2:58
12. "Take Me" (Jones, Payne) – 2:40

== Chart performance ==
Chart (1965)	Peak position
US Top Country Albums (Billboard)	5
