= Along Came Jones =

Along Came Jones may refer to:

- Along Came Jones a 1945 western comedy
- "Along Came Jones", a 1959 comedic song
- Along Came Jones, a 1965 album by Tom Jones
- And Along Came Jones, a 1991 album by George Jones
