= List of Hot Country Singles & Tracks number ones of 1996 =

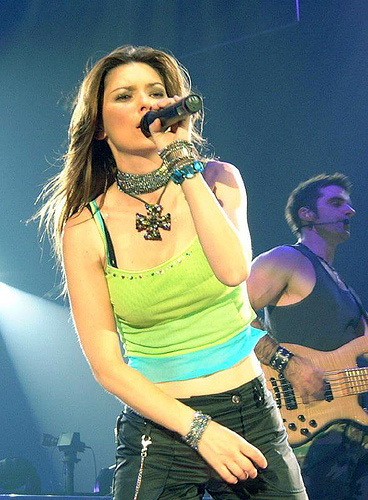
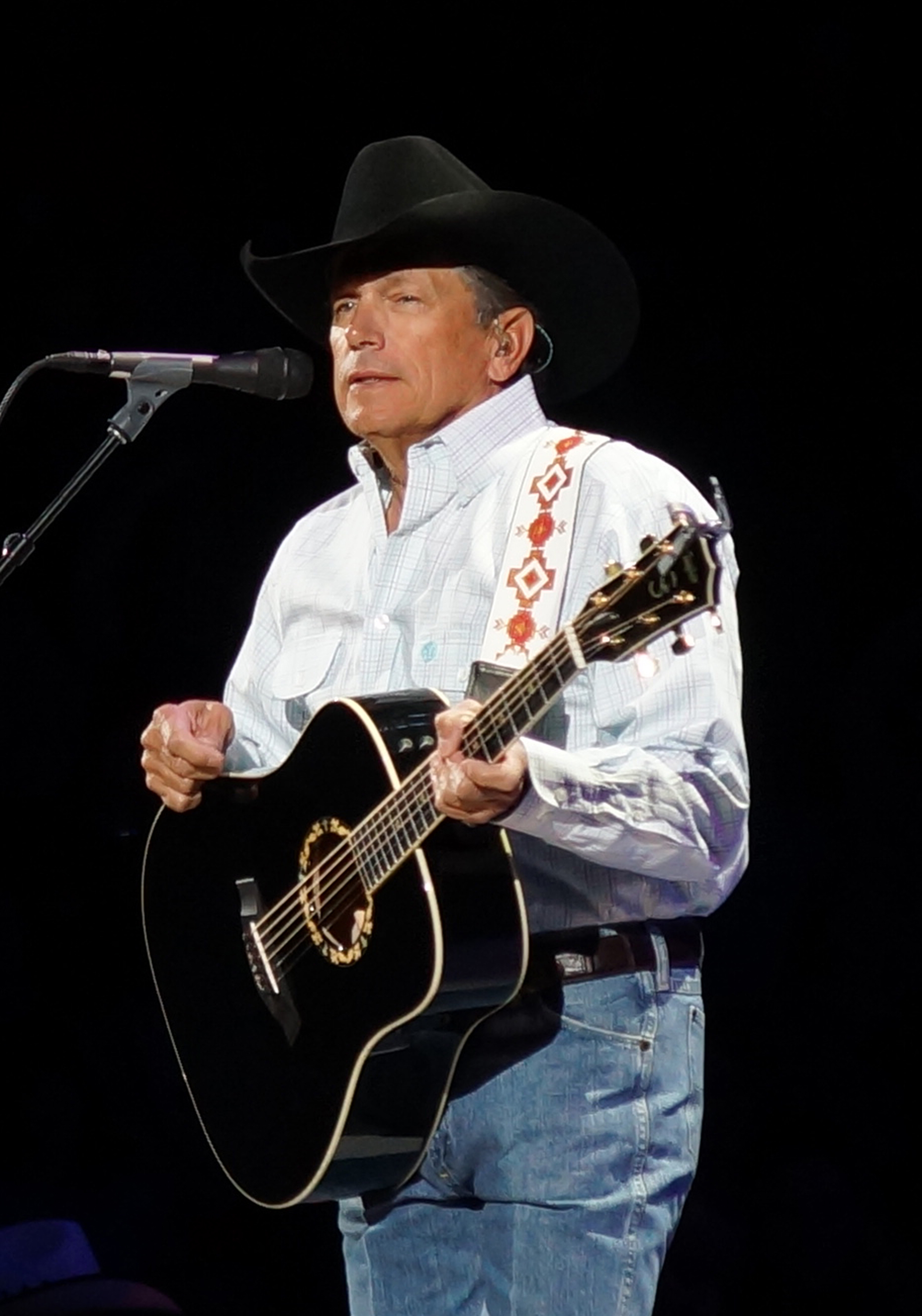
Shania Twain and George Strait each spent five weeks at number one in 1996.

Hot Country Songs is a chart that ranks the top-performing country music songs in the United States, published by Billboard magazine. In 1996, 28 different songs topped the chart, then published under the title Hot Country Singles & Tracks, in 52 issues of the magazine, based on weekly airplay data from country music radio stations compiled by Nielsen Broadcast Data Systems.

The first number one of the year was "Rebecca Lynn" by Bryan White, which moved into the top spot in the issue dated January 6 and remained in place for only a single week before being replaced by "It Matters to Me" by Faith Hill. Canadian singer Shania Twain had the most number ones in 1996, topping the chart with "(If You're Not in It for Love) I'm Outta Here!", "You Win My Love" and "No One Needs to Know". The three songs spent a total of five weeks at the top of the chart, tying Twain for the most weeks at number one by an artist with George Strait, who spent two weeks in the top spot with "Blue Clear Sky" and three with "Carried Away". Alan Jackson, Patty Loveless and Bryan White were the only other acts to have more than one number one in 1996. The longest unbroken run at number one in 1996 was three weeks, which was achieved by seven different songs.

The final number one of the year was "One Way Ticket (Because I Can)" by LeAnn Rimes, which was the teenaged vocalist's first number one in the U.S. It would, however, prove to be the only country chart-topper for Rimes, whose career has fluctuated between country and pop. Other artists to top the chart for the first time in 1996 were Martina McBride with "Wild Angels", Deana Carter with "Strawberry Wine", Lonestar with "No News", and Rhett Akins with "Don't Get Me Started".

== Chart history ==
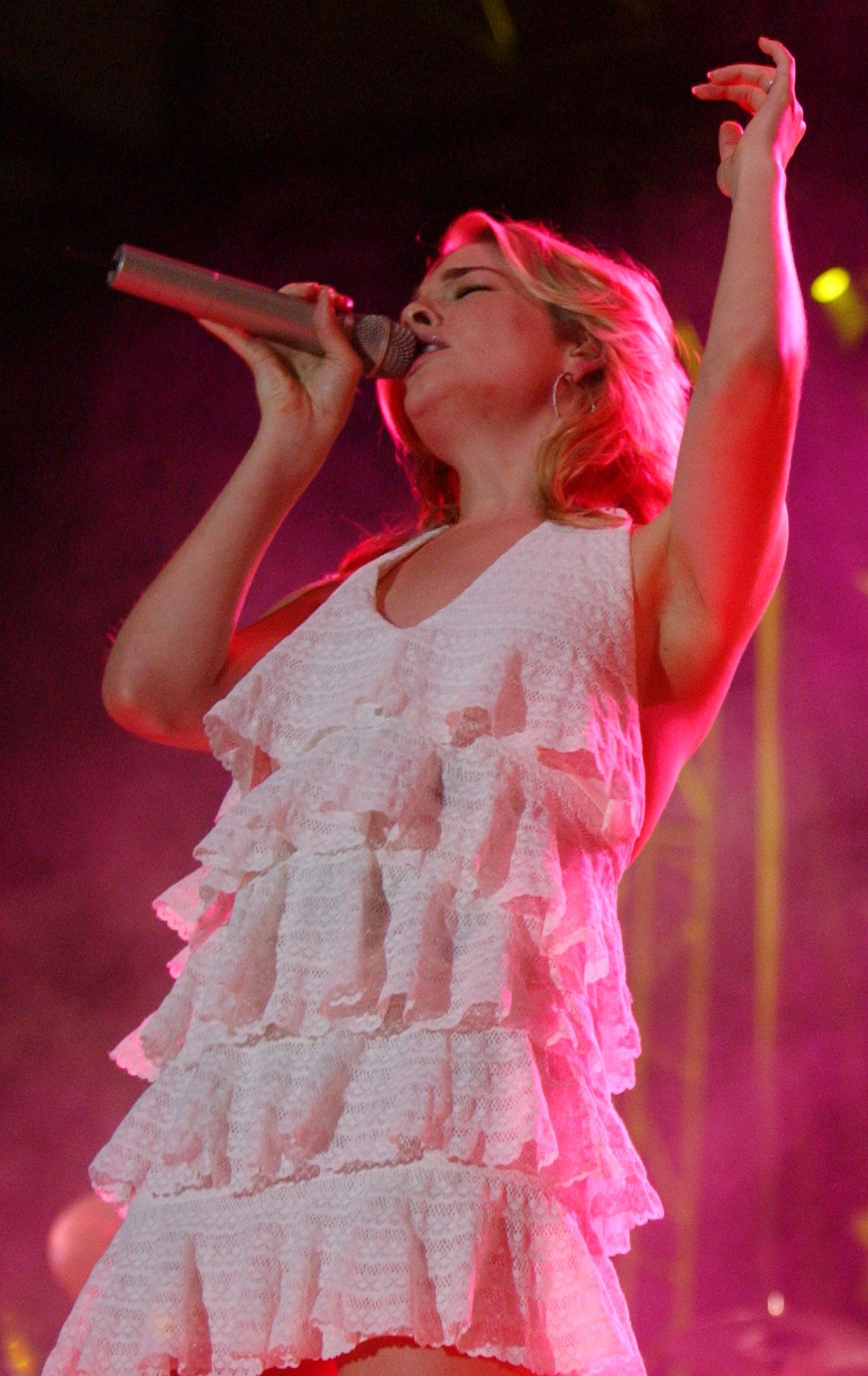
LeAnn Rimes had the final number one of the year.

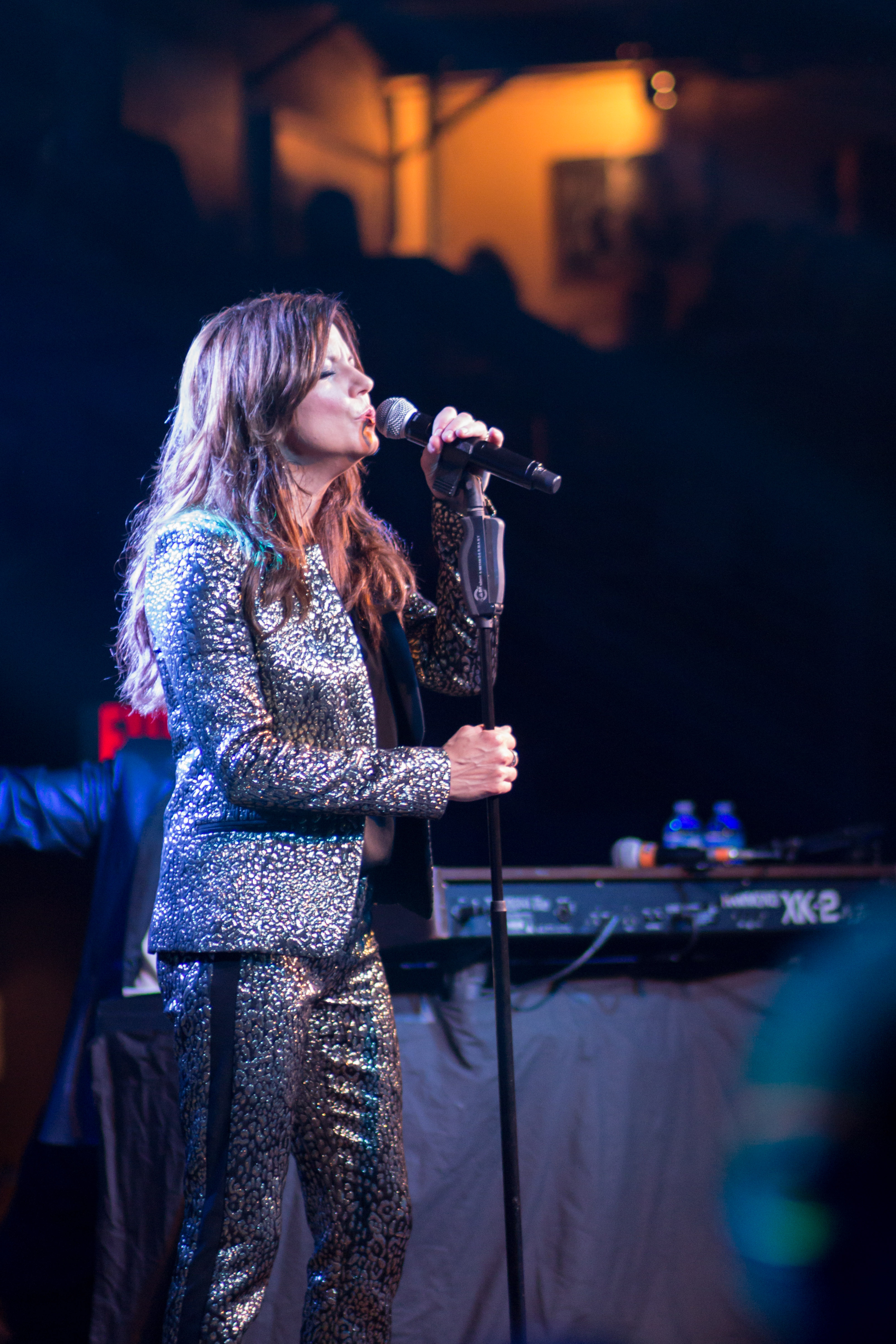
Martina McBride had her first number one in 1996 with "Wild Angels".

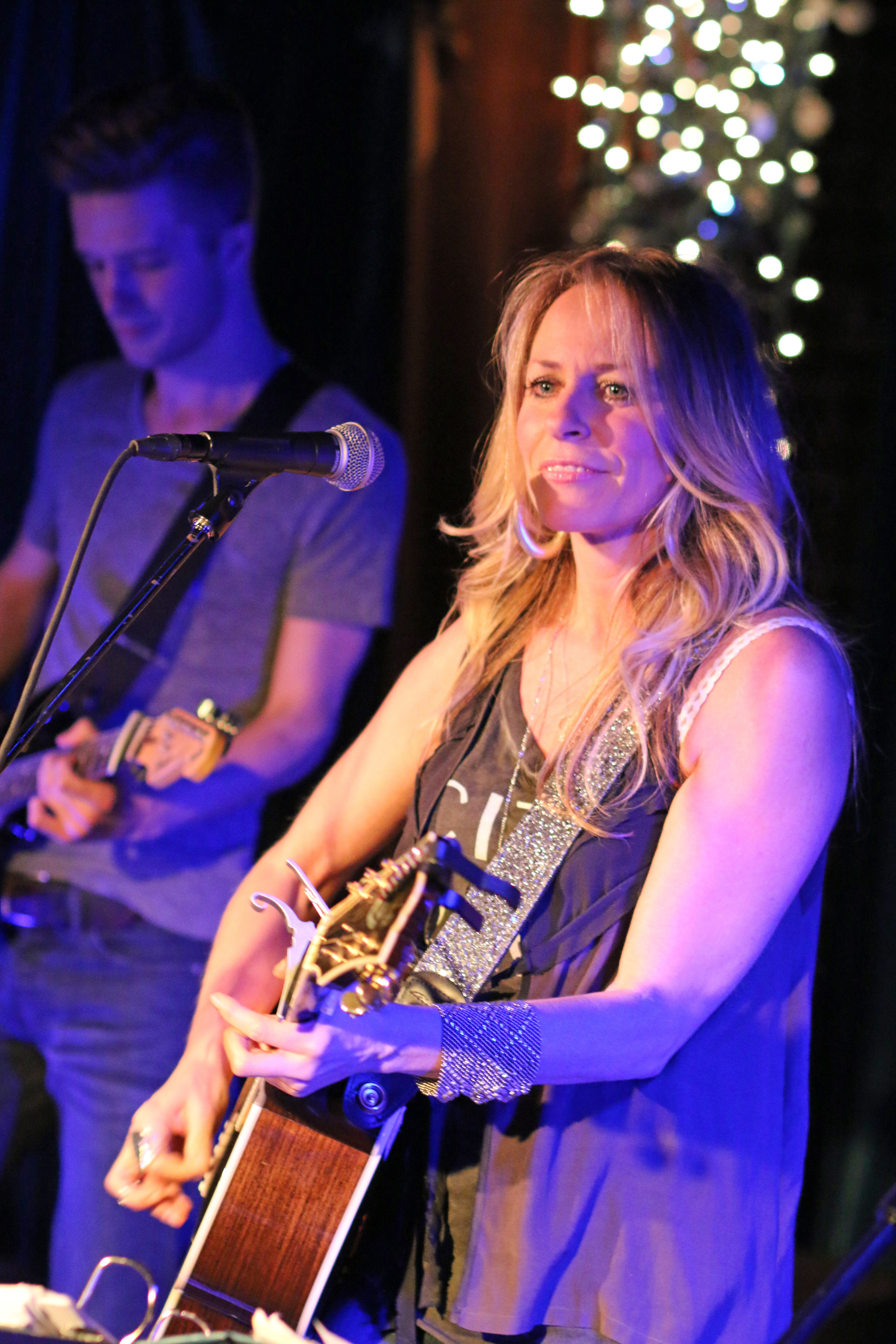
"Strawberry Wine" gave Deana Carter her first number one in November.

| Issue date | Title | Artist(s) | Ref. |
|---|---|---|---|
| January 6 | "Rebecca Lynn" | Bryan White | |
| January 13 | "It Matters to Me" | Faith Hill | |
| January 20 | "It Matters to Me" | Faith Hill | |
| January 27 | "It Matters to Me" | Faith Hill | |
| February 3 | "(If You're Not in It for Love) I'm Outta Here!" | Shania Twain | |
| February 10 | "(If You're Not in It for Love) I'm Outta Here!" | Shania Twain | |
| February 17 | "Bigger Than the Beatles" | Joe Diffie | |
| February 24 | "Bigger Than the Beatles" | Joe Diffie | |
| March 2 | "Wild Angels" | Martina McBride | |
| March 9 | "I'll Try" | Alan Jackson | |
| March 16 | "The Beaches of Cheyenne" | Garth Brooks | |
| March 23 | "You Can Feel Bad" | Patty Loveless | |
| March 30 | "You Can Feel Bad" | Patty Loveless | |
| April 6 | "To Be Loved by You" | Wynonna | |
| April 13 | "No News" | Lonestar | |
| April 20 | "No News" | Lonestar | |
| April 27 | "No News" | Lonestar | |
| May 4 | "You Win My Love" | Shania Twain | |
| May 11 | "You Win My Love" | Shania Twain | |
| May 18 | "My Maria" | Brooks & Dunn | |
| May 25 | "My Maria" | Brooks & Dunn | |
| June 1 | "My Maria" | Brooks & Dunn | |
| June 8 | "Blue Clear Sky" | George Strait | |
| June 15 | "Blue Clear Sky" | George Strait | |
| June 22 | "Time Marches On" | Tracy Lawrence | |
| June 29 | "Time Marches On" | Tracy Lawrence | |
| July 6 | "Time Marches On" | Tracy Lawrence | |
| July 13 | "No One Needs to Know" | Shania Twain | |
| July 20 | "Daddy's Money" | Ricochet | |
| July 27 | "Daddy's Money" | Ricochet | |
| August 3 | "Don't Get Me Started" | Rhett Akins | |
| August 10 | "Carried Away" | George Strait | |
| August 17 | "Carried Away" | George Strait | |
| August 24 | "Carried Away" | George Strait | |
| August 31 | "She Never Lets It Go to Her Heart" | Tim McGraw | |
| September 7 | "She Never Lets It Go to Her Heart" | Tim McGraw | |
| September 14 | "Guys Do It All the Time" | Mindy McCready | |
| September 21 | "So Much for Pretending" | Bryan White | |
| September 28 | "So Much for Pretending" | Bryan White | |
| October 5 | "Living in a Moment" | Ty Herndon | |
| October 12 | "Believe Me Baby (I Lied)" | Trisha Yearwood | |
| October 19 | "Believe Me Baby (I Lied)" | Trisha Yearwood | |
| October 26 | "Like the Rain" | Clint Black | |
| November 2 | "Like the Rain" | Clint Black | |
| November 9 | "Like the Rain" | Clint Black | |
| November 16 | "Lonely Too Long" | Patty Loveless | |
| November 23 | "Strawberry Wine" | Deana Carter | |
| November 30 | "Strawberry Wine" | Deana Carter | |
| December 7 | "Little Bitty" | Alan Jackson | |
| December 14 | "Little Bitty" | Alan Jackson | |
| December 21 | "Little Bitty" | Alan Jackson | |
| December 28 | "One Way Ticket (Because I Can)" | LeAnn Rimes | |

== See also ==
- 1996 in music
- List of artists who reached number one on the U.S. country chart
