= Lead On =

Studio album by George Strait
- Released: November 8, 1994
- Recorded: April 1994
- Studios: Emerald Studios, Sound Stage Studios and Masterfonics (Nashville, Tennessee)
- Genres: Texas country; honky-tonk
- Length: 30:38
- Label: MCA
- Producers: Tony Brown; George Strait

George Strait chronology
Easy Come Easy Go (1993)	Lead On (1994)	Strait Out of the Box (1995)

Singles from Lead On
- 1. "The Big One" Released: October 3, 1994; 2. "You Can't Make a Heart Love Somebody" Released: December 5, 1994; 3. "Adalida" Released: March 20, 1995; 4. "Lead On" Released: June 13, 1995

Professional ratings
Review scores
Source	Rating
Allmusic	3/5 stars
Entertainment Weekly	B

Lead On is the fifteenth studio album by American country music artist George Strait. The album was released on November 8, 1994 by MCA Nashville and was certified platinum in the U.S. for sales of one million copies. It includes the singles "The Big One", "You Can't Make a Heart Love Somebody", "Lead On", and "Adalida", which respectively reached No. 1, No. 1, No. 7 and No. 3 on the Hot Country Songs charts between 1994 and 1995. The album's title track was co-written by Alabama bass guitarist Teddy Gentry. "I Met a Friend of Yours Today" was originally recorded by Mel Street.

== Track listing ==
No.	Title	Writer(s)	Length
1.	"You Can't Make a Heart Love Somebody"	Steve Clark, Johnny MacRae	3:20
2.	"Adalida"	Mike Geiger, Woody Mullis, Michael Huffman	3:36
3.	"I Met a Friend of Yours Today"	Bob McDill, Wayland Holyfield	3:15
4.	"Nobody Has to Get Hurt"	Jim Lauderdale, Terry McBride	2:30
5.	"Down Louisiana Way"	Aaron Barker, Donny Kees, Sanger D. Shafer	4:17
6.	"Lead On"	Dean Dillon, Teddy Gentry	3:26
7.	"What Am I Waiting For"	Lauderdale	2:37
8.	"The Big One"	Gerry House, Devon O'Day	2:07
9.	"I'll Always Be Loving You"	Barker, Kees, Shafer	2:31
10.	"No One but You"	Max D. Barnes	2:56

== Personnel ==
As listed in liner notes.

- George Strait – lead vocals
- Steve Nathan – organ, synthesizers
- Matt Rollings – acoustic piano, keyboards
- Steve Gibson – acoustic guitars, electric guitars
- Brent Mason – acoustic guitars, electric guitars
- Buddy Emmons – steel guitar
- Paul Franklin – steel guitar
- Stuart Duncan – fiddle, mandolin
- Glenn Worf – bass guitar
- Eddie Bayers – drums
- Bergen White – string arrangements
- Liana Manis – backing vocals
- Curtis Young – backing vocals

=== Production ===
- Tony Brown – producer
- George Strait – producer
- Steve Marcantonio – recording
- Marty Williams – overdub recording
- Derek Bason – second engineer
- Russ Martin – second engineer
- John Thomas II – second engineer
- John Guess – mixing
- Glenn Meadows – mastering
- Jessie Noble – project coordinator
- Virginia Team – art direction
- Chris Ferrara – design
- Jarrett Gaza – photography
- Erv Woolsey – management

== Charts ==
=== Weekly charts ===
Chart (1994)	Peak position
Canadian Country Albums (RPM)	3
US Billboard 200	26
US Top Country Albums (Billboard)	1

=== Year-end charts ===
Chart (1995)	Position
US Billboard 200	78
US Top Country Albums (Billboard)	11

== Certifications ==
Certifications for Lead On
Region	Certification	Certified units/sales
United States (RIAA)	2× Platinum	2,000,000^{^}
^{^} Shipments figures based on certification alone.
