= King of the Mountain (George Jones song) =

Single by George Strait

from the album Blue Clear Sky
- B-side: "I'd Just as Soon Go"
- Released: December 16, 1996
- Genre: Country
- Length: 3:28Ń
- Label: MCA
- Songwriters: Larry Boone; Paul Nelson
- Producers: Tony Brown; George Strait

George Strait singles chronology
"I Can Still Make Cheyenne" (1996)	"King of the Mountain" (1996)	"One Night at a Time" (1997)

"King of the Mountain" a song written by Larry Boone and Paul Nelson. First recorded in 1991 by George Jones for his album And Along Came Jones, the song was also cut by Boone on his 1993 album Get in Line.

It was later covered by American country music artist George Strait, and was released in December 1996 as the fourth and final single from his album Blue Clear Sky. The song reached #19 in the United States and number 27 in Canada. Even though the song was his lowest peaking single since 1992's, "Lovesick Blues", it was one of the most critically acclaimed country songs in years.

== Critical reception ==
Deborah Evans Price, of Billboard magazine reviewed the song favorably, calling it a "lyrically powerful weeper, and Strait's performance exudes oceans of mournful regret."

== Chart performance ==
"King of the Mountain" debuted at number 48 on the U.S. Billboard Hot Country Singles & Tracks for the week of December 21, 1996.

Chart (1996–1997)	Peak position
Canada Country Singles (RPM)	27
US Hot Country Songs (Billboard)	19
