= Lead On (song) =

Single by George Strait

from the album Lead On
- B-side: "I Met a Friend of Yours Today"
- Released: June 13, 1995
- Genre: Country
- Length: 3:26
- Label: MCA 55064
- Songwriters: Dean Dillon; Teddy Gentry
- Producers: Tony Brown; George Strait

George Strait singles chronology
"Adalida" (1995)	"Lead On" (1995)	"Check Yes or No" (1995)

"Lead On" is a song written by Dean Dillon and Teddy Gentry, and recorded by American country music artist George Strait. It was released in June 1995 as the fourth and final single and title track from his album Lead On. The song reached number 7 on the Billboard Hot Country Singles & Tracks chart in September 1995.

== Content ==
The song is a ballad which at first seems to indicate the beginnings of a love affair. As the song continues into the second verse however, it is revealed that the man and the woman had already in fact been lovers and his appearance in this new town is his admission to being a fool and an offer to settle down.

== Critical reception ==
Deborah Evans Price, of Billboard magazine reviewed the song favorably, calling it a "slow and pretty ballad." She goes on to say that Strait is the "master of subtle country love songs, and he delivers the goods on this lovely ballad."

== Chart performance ==
"Lead On" debuted at number 67 on the U.S. Billboard Hot Country Singles & Tracks for the week of June 24, 1995.

Chart (1995)	Peak position
Canada Country Singles (RPM)	8
US Hot Country Songs (Billboard)	7
