= You Can't Make a Heart Love Somebody =

Single by George Strait

from the album Lead On
- B-side: "What Am I Waiting For"
- Released: December 5, 1994
- Recorded: April 19, 1994
- Genre: Country
- Length: 3:21 (album version); 2:48 (single edit)
- Label: MCA 54964
- Songwriters: Steve Clark, Johnny MacRae
- Producers: Tony Brown, George Strait

George Strait singles chronology
"The Big One" (1994)	"You Can't Make a Heart Love Somebody" (1994)	"Adalida" (1995)

"You Can't Make a Heart Love Somebody" is a song written by Johnny MacRae and Steve Clark, and recorded by American country music singer George Strait. It was released in December 1994 as the second single from his album Lead On.

== Content ==
The song is about a man who proposes to his girlfriend, but she rejects it. In a play on the proverb, "You can lead a horse to water but you can't make him drink," the woman tearfully explains that—despite her best efforts—she is simply not in love with her boyfriend ("You can lead a heart to love, but you can't make it fall").

== Critical reception ==
Larry Flick, of Billboard magazine reviewed the song favorably, calling it a fine ballad. He goes on to say that Strait and co-producer Tony Brown have "refined the song search process to a science, and the singer outdoes himself here."

== Chart positions ==
"You Can't Make a Heart Love Somebody" number 59 on the U.S. Billboard Hot Country Singles & Tracks for the week of December 24, 1994.

Chart (1994–1995)	Peak position
Canada Country Singles (RPM)	2
US Bubbling Under Hot 100 (Billboard)	11
US Hot Country Songs (Billboard)	1

=== Year-end charts ===
Chart (1995)	Position
Canada Country Tracks (RPM)	28
US Country Songs (Billboard)	42
