= Sara Douga =

American country singer (born 1991)

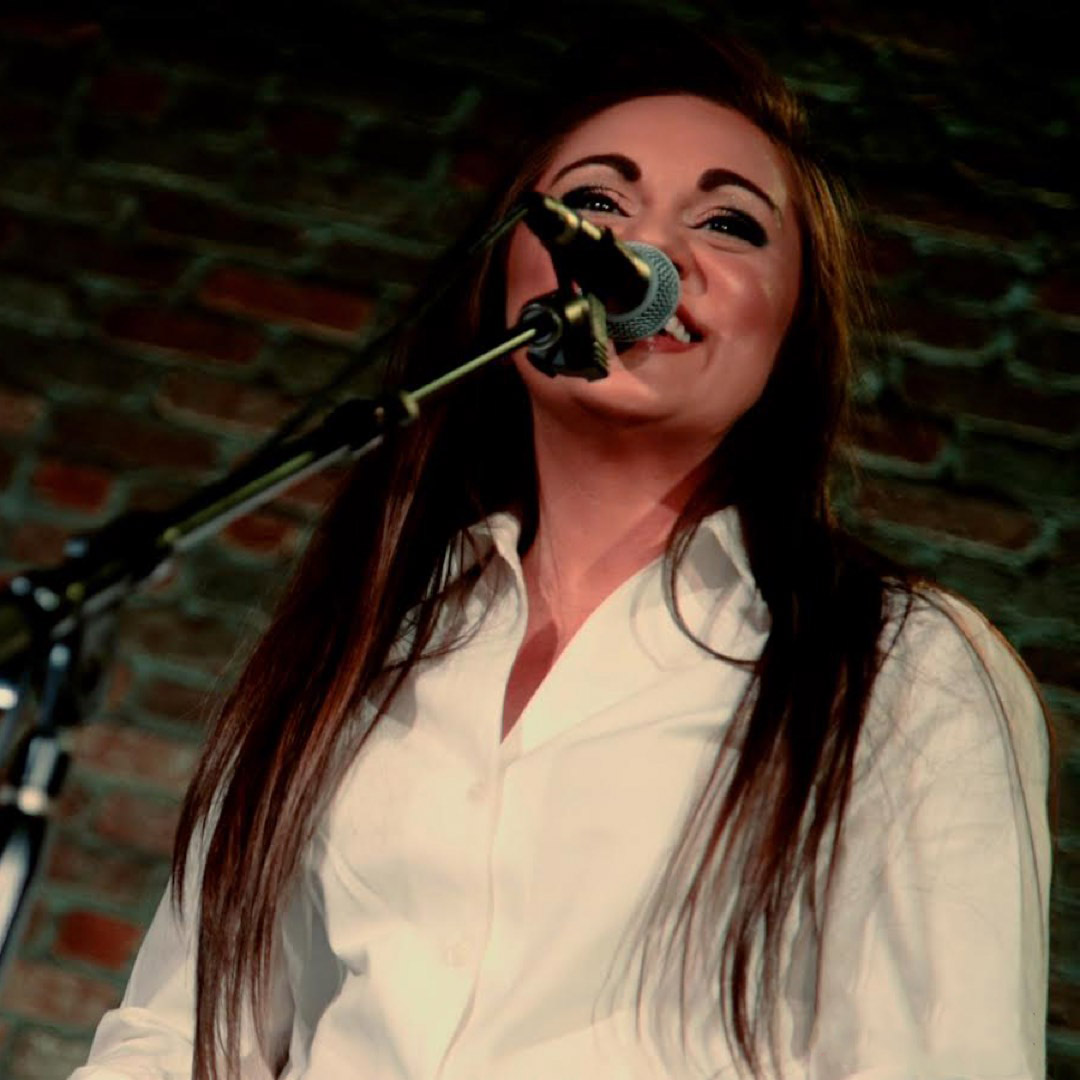

Background information
- Born: Sara Elizabeth Douga; April 27, 1991 (age 35); Sulphur, Louisiana, U.S.
- Genres: Country
- Occupation: Singer-songwriter
- Instruments: Vocals; guitar
- Label: Self-released
- Website: saradouga.com

Sara Elizabeth Douga (born April 27, 1991), known professionally as Sara Douga, is an American country music singer-songwriter.

== Early life ==
She began her career at a young age, writing her first song at age eight, playing local casinos at 15, and recording for the first time at 16. Douga was approached to go on the road at the end of her high school career, but she declined and instead accepted a full ride to attend college at McNeese State University where she obtained a B.S. in Natural Resource Conservation Management with a focus on Wildlife Management. During her college years, Douga interned for The United States Fish and Wildlife Service, Texas Parks and Wildlife Department of Coastal Fisheries, and a privately owned hunting club called The Marsh Club. Douga was published as an undergrad in the Texas Journal of Science, writing the first noted case of malocclusion in the gray squirrel. She was also published commercially in the Texas Salt Water Fishing Magazine. Photos of Douga fishing offshore are still often used in The Houston Chronicle.

== Career ==
Throughout these work assignments Douga continued to write songs and perform locally. In 2011 she won the Texaco Country Showdown representing KIX 96 KYKZ in Lake Charles, Louisiana. From there she began sitting in with traditional Cajun bands in Louisiana. In 2018, Sara won the South Louisiana Songwriters Festival & Workshop (SOLO) scholarship sponsored by the CREATE initiative, the Buddy Holly Foundation Educational Foundation and BMG Music.

In 2018 Douga self-released her rookie record Boots, Bras, and Drawers. While she had written most of this record in high school and college but the music held the test of time and was quickly recognized by Country Music People Magazine.

Whispering Bob Harris showed his support of the album by playing six of the 12 tracks on his weekly radio show on BBC Radio 2. He put Douga's song "We're Just Dancin' " on his Bob Harris County playlist June 14, 2018, her song "Spill This Bottle" on July 12, 2018, "A Cowboy Like You" on July 19, 2018, and again played "We're Just Dancin'" on October 11, 2018. On October 26, 2018 Bob Harris introduced Sara Douga and other acts at Bush Hall in Country to Country's Country Music Week in London. This was the first time Douga had performed on stage in London, and she followed up the performance with another at The Ned in an Under the Apple Tree Live event.

Douga opened for Dylan LeBlanc in the 2019 Greetings From Levy Park annual concert in Crowley, Louisiana. Sara frequently collaborates with Jim Lauderdale who has recorded four of his and Sara's co-written songs. Most recently, Douga co-wrote the song "I'm Here to Remind You" in his 2020 album When Carolina Comes Home Again. She was invited by Jim Lauderdale to make her debut guest appearance on The Grand Ole Opry stage in 2019.

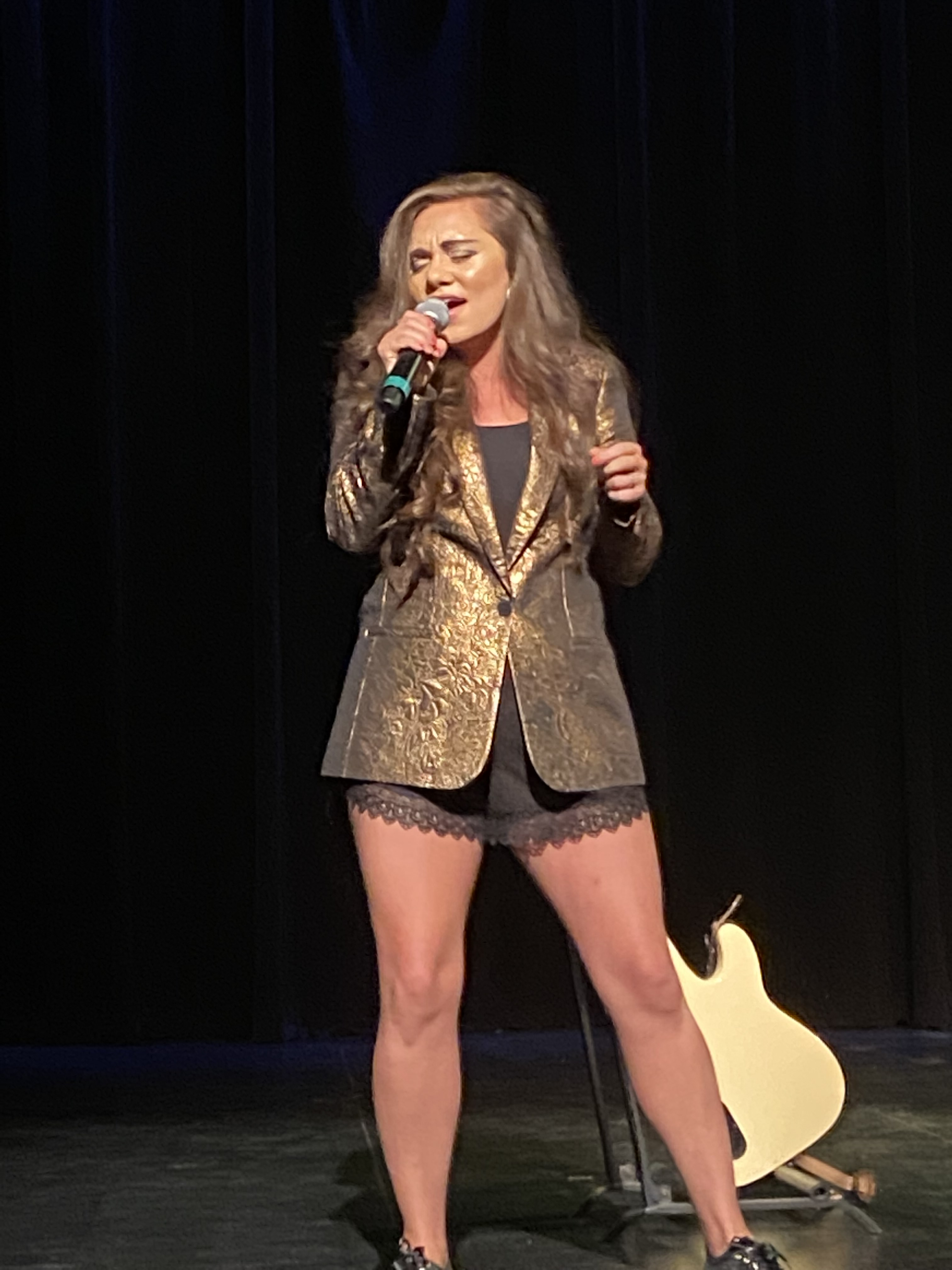
Douga performing with Jim Lauderdale on July 20, 2021, in the 20th Season of the Louisiana Crossroads series.

During the 2020 COVID-19 pandemic, Douga took the extra time to focus on producing music, calling the time "uber-productive." She released an acoustic EP, Lines, accompanied by a music video that was supported by CMT, SiriusXM 'The Outlaw', and CountryLine TV. On October 9, 2020, Douga's 3rd self-released project, a fully produced studio EP called Joe & Gin, was released to major digital streaming platforms. Whispering Bob Harris premiered the title track on his weekly radio show on BBC Radio 2, and the EP was also played on Country Rebel, WSM's Coffee, Country, & Cody, SiriusXM, and multiple Spotify playlists.

In the week of January 30, 2023, Ella Hooper's album SMALL TOWN TEMPLE went number 1 on ARIA's top 20 Australian country albums. Douga is credited with co-writing the title track "Small Town Temple" and "Old News" with Hooper.

== Personal life ==
Douga met her husband while performing with Jamey Bearb at a private event. She took a break from music to marry her husband and have two children. In 2019 Douga and her family moved to Nashville.

== Artistry ==
Sara has been credited with a "traditional country" sound.

=== Associated acts ===
Artist	Relationship	Songs Worked on Together
Jim Lauderdale	Co-writes, records and plays shows with Douga	Douga's discography: I'll Forgive You if You Don't; Lauderdale's discography: I'm Here To Remind You
Melonie Cannon	Back vocalist for Douga in studio	Douga's entire album Joe & Gin (2020)
David Maldonado	Co-writes, records and plays shows with Douga	Performance: The Listening Room, Nashville (2021)

== Discography ==
=== Albums ===
Title	Details	Songs
Boots, Bras, and Drawers	Released: October 19, 2018; Label: Self-released	1. Boots, Bras, and Drawers – 3:18; 2. A Cowboy Like You – 4:04; 3. Spill This Bottle – 3:22; 4. We're Just Dancin – 3:58; 5. Out of My Heart – 3:34; 6. Gypsy Shoes – 3:59; 7. Long Time Coming – 5:09; 8. Alan Jackson Cd's – 3:02; 9. One Like Daddy (Kristi's Song) – 5:02; 10. I Miss You – 3:35; 11. Heaven – 2:55; 12. Loving You on Paper – 4:06

=== Extended plays ===
Title	Details	Songs
Joe & Gin	Released: October 9, 2020; Label: Self-released	1. Joe & Gin – 3:16; 2. I'll Forgive You If You Don't – 3:07; 3. Help Me Make It Through the Night – 3:35
Lines	Released: June 20, 2020; Label: Self-released	1. Fair Warning – 3:44; 2. Playbook – 3:29; 3. Lines – 2:36
