= I Can Still Make Cheyenne =

Single by George Strait

from the album Blue Clear Sky
- B-side: "Need I Say More"
- Released: August 26, 1996
- Recorded: September 28, 1995
- Genre: Country, Western
- Length: 4:15
- Label: MCA Nashville 55248
- Songwriters: Aaron Barker, Erv Woolsey
- Producers: Tony Brown, George Strait

George Strait singles chronology
"Carried Away" (1996)	"I Can Still Make Cheyenne" (1996)	"King of the Mountain" (1996)

"I Can Still Make Cheyenne" is a song written by Aaron Barker and Erv Woolsey, and recorded by American country music artist George Strait. It was released in August 1996 as the third single from Strait's album Blue Clear Sky. The song also appears on 50 Number Ones. A live version can be heard on his album, For the Last Time: Live from the Astrodome, which came out in 2003. A DVD, with the same name, also features the song.

== Content ==
The song is about the life of a rodeo cowboy. The song begins with the verse, "Her telephone rang 'bout a quarter to nine. She heard his voice on the other end of the line. She wondered what was wrong this time. She never knew what his calls might bring, with a cowboy like him it could be anything, and she always expected the worst in the back of her mind." A phone call from a cowboy on the road to his lover. The cowboy regrets his long absence and lack of writing or calling but assures her that he is coming home. However, her tone alerts him that something is wrong. The chorus reveals that the woman has decided to leave him for someone she says "sure ain’t no rodeo man". The cowboy replies that as much as this pains him, he will go on to Cheyenne, referring to the most prestigious rodeo around. He was going to give up Cheyenne to be with her, one of the biggest sacrifices a cowboy could make until she said she was leaving him for another. The song describes the cowboy ending the call and leaving the phone off the hook and slowly turning around and taking one last look. He then gets in his truck and "aims it toward that Wyoming line." The lyrics leave the listener to decide if the Cowboy was neglectful of his love, or if she gave up on him for another, who was not a rodeo man. The last verse of the song repeats the first. The soulful fiddle solo at the end of the song is one of the signatures of the song.

== Chart positions ==
"I Can Still Make Cheyenne" debuted at number 74 on the U.S. Billboard Hot Country Singles & Tracks for the week of August 24, 1996.

Chart (1996)	Peak position
Canada Country Singles (RPM)	2
US Hot Country Songs (Billboard)	4

=== Year-end charts ===
Chart (1996)	Position
Canada Country Tracks (RPM)	61

== Certifications ==
Certifications for I Can Still Make Cheyenne
Region	Certification	Certified units/sales
United States (RIAA)	Platinum	1,000,000^{‡}
^{‡} Sales+streaming figures based on certification alone.
