= Things Have Gone to Pieces =

Single by George Jones
- A-side: "Wearing My Heart Away"
- Released: March 13, 1965
- Genre: Country
- Length: 2:56
- Label: Musicor
- Songwriter: Leon Payne
- Producer: Pappy Daily

George Jones singles chronology
"Least of All" (1964)	"Things Have Gone to Pieces" (1965)	"Love Bug" (1965)

"Things Have Gone to Pieces" is a song written by Leon Payne and originally recorded by country music artist George Jones. It was Jones' first single after signing with the Musicor label and spent a total of twenty-one weeks on the Billboard survey, peaking at #9 in 1965. It was a solo that Jones released on his 1965 album with Gene Pitney, For the First Time! Two Great Stars - George Jones and Gene Pitney.

The song lists a litany of negative events that have befallen the narrator since his lover has left him. Despite its comically melodramatic premise, Jones delivers one of his most bluesy, soulful vocals that give the words resonance. In his 2016 Jones memoir The Grand Tour, biographer Rich Kienzle asserts, "George's peerless approach elevated this simple ballad to a masterpiece that became his first solo hit on Musicor in the spring of 1965. Today it remains a high point of his six years with the label." Merle Haggard would record the song for the second Jones/Haggard duet album Kickin' Out the Footlights...Again in 2006.
