= Check Yes or No =

Single by George Strait

from the album Strait Out of the Box
- Released: September 18, 1995
- Recorded: April 10, 1995
- Genre: Country
- Length: 3:20
- Label: MCA 12236
- Songwriters: Danny Wells; Dana Hunt Black
- Producers: Tony Brown; George Strait

George Strait singles chronology
"Lead On" (1995)	"Check Yes or No" (1995)	"I Know She Still Loves Me" (1995)

"Check Yes or No" is a song written by Danny Wells and Dana Hunt Black, and recorded by American country music singer George Strait. It was released in September 1995 as the lead single from his box set Strait Out of the Box. It peaked at number-one on both the U.S. Billboard country chart and the Canadian RPM country chart. It was also included as a bonus track on the UK version of the Blue Clear Sky album in 1996.

== Background ==
"Check Yes or No" tells the story of two schoolchildren who develop a crush on one another, passing love notes and flirting on the playground. In the second verse, the song shifts to the present, with the narrator celebrating their longevity after two decades of marriage.

The song was written by Danny Wells and Dana Hunt Black, two Nashville songwriters. It was both of their first songs to be recorded by a major artist. In an interview, Black recalled that she had originally developed the song's chorus a year before she moved to the Music City, but kept it to herself. In a songwriting session with Wells at the ASCAP offices, Black shared the idea, and the two got to work developing the song. An original demo of the song was included on the 2010 compilation The Original Songwriter Demos Volumes 1 & 2. Strait was particularly fond of the song upon his first listen. "That was one of the songs though that I knew, right away when I first heard it, I wanted to cut it," he remarked to CMT, adding that his toddler son was a big fan. Strait recorded the song at Emerald Sound Studios in Nashville on April 10, 1995.

== Critical reception ==
Deborah Evans Price, of Billboard magazine reviewed the song favorably saying that the song "is another winner from country music's most consistent hit maker." She also states that Strait delivers it with "warmth and charm, as well as with an upbeat melody tailor-made for country radio." In a 2017 profile of Strait for The New Yorker, Kelefa Sanneh characterized it as a "good-natured radio perennial."

The song was awarded a CMA and an ACM for Single of the Year. "Check Yes or No" remains one of Strait's biggest singles in the streaming age: it still regularly attracted hundreds of weekly spins on key country radio stations in the 2010s, and was ranked by listeners as their favorite CMA Single of the Year of the preceding quarter-century.

== Covers ==
The song has been covered by Kane Brown, Austin Mahone and Scotty McCreery, both in his finale of American Idol and at live shows. Strait himself requested McCreery perform the song on Idol. Florida Georgia Line reference "Check Yes or No" on their album Dig Your Roots.

== Music video ==
The music video for the song featured actor/singer/songwriter Michael Ray Ryan as the main character and Dawn Waggoner (the real-life founder of the Texas Bikini Team) as the main character's leading lady.

== Chart positions ==
"Check Yes or No" debuted at number 63 on the U.S. Billboard Hot Country Singles & Tracks for the week of September 23, 1995. It topped the charts for four weeks upon its ascent to the summit.

Chart (1995)	Peak position
Canada Country Singles (RPM)	1
US Hot Country Songs (Billboard)	1

=== Year-end charts ===
Chart (1995)	Position
Canada Country Tracks (RPM)	19

== Certifications ==
Region	Certification	Certified units/sales
United States (RIAA)	5× Platinum	5,000,000^{‡}
^{‡} Sales+streaming figures based on certification alone.
