= Adalida =

Single by George Strait

from the album Lead On
- B-side: "Down Louisiana Way"
- Released: March 20, 1995
- Recorded: April 18, 1994
- Genre: Country, zydeco
- Length: 3:36
- Label: MCA 55019
- Songwriters: Mike Geiger, Woody Mullis, Michael Huffman
- Producers: Tony Brown, George Strait

George Strait singles chronology
"You Can't Make a Heart Love Somebody" (1994)	"Adalida" (1995)	"Lead On" (1995)

"Adalida" is a song recorded by American country music artist George Strait. It was released in March 1995 as the third single from his album Lead On. It peaked at number 3 in the United States, and number 2 in Canada. It was written by Mike Geiger, Woody Mullis and Michael Huffman.

== Content ==
The song is an uptempo, in which the narrator refers to a "Cajun queen" named Adalida. It was inspired by a young lady George Strait met in his hometown, named Ida. He was about to sing at the strawberry festival in Poteet, when he ran into her.

== Cover versions ==
Country music band Sugarland covered the song from the television special George Strait: ACM Artist of the Decade All Star Concert.

Tim Armstrong from the band Rancid, covered the song in 2012 with his side project Tim Timebomb.

== Critical reception ==
Deborah Evans Price, of Billboard magazine reviewed the song favorably, calling it a "zydeco-spiced single", and that in the hands of a lesser singer, "a song like this would have been difficult to stretch." Alanna Nash of Entertainment Weekly was less favorable, saying that it "fails to challenge him in even the slightest way".

== Chart positions ==
"Adalida" debuted at number 72 on the U.S. Billboard Hot Country Singles & Tracks for the week of March 25, 1995.

Chart (1995)	Peak position
Canada Country Singles (RPM)	2
US Hot Country Songs (Billboard)	3

=== Year-end charts ===
Chart (1995)	Position
Canada Country Tracks (RPM)	29
US Country Songs (Billboard)	62

=== Cover Versions ===
- In October 2012, Tim Armstrong recorded a version as a part of his Tim Timebomb and Friends project
