= I Know She Still Loves Me =

Single by George Strait

from the album Strait Out of the Box
- B-side: "Unwound"
- Released: December 11, 1995
- Recorded: April 10, 1995
- Genre: Country
- Length: 3:07
- Label: MCA 55163
- Songwriters: Aaron Barker; Monty Holmes
- Producers: Tony Brown; George Strait

George Strait singles chronology
| "Check Yes or No" (1995) | "I Know She Still Loves Me" (1995) | "Blue Clear Sky" (1996) |

"I Know She Still Loves Me" is a song written by Aaron Barker and Monty Holmes, and recorded by American country music artist George Strait. It was released in December 1995 as the second and final single from his box set Strait Out of the Box. The song reached number 5 on the Billboard Hot Country Singles & Tracks chart in March 1996.

== Chart performance ==
"I Know She Still Loves Me" debuted at number 57 on the U.S. Billboard Hot Country Singles & Tracks for the week of December 23, 1995.

| Chart (1995–1996) | Peak position |
|---|---|
| Canada Country Singles (RPM) | 8 |
| US Hot Country Songs (Billboard) | 5 |

=== Year-end charts ===
| Chart (1996) | Position |
|---|---|
| Canada Country Tracks (RPM) | 73 |
| US Country Songs (Billboard) | 43 |
