= And Along Came Jones =

Studio album by George Jones
- Released: October 15, 1991
- Genre: Country
- Length: 31:51
- Label: MCA Nashville
- Producer: Kyle Lehning

George Jones chronology
You Oughta Be Here with Me (1990)	And Along Came Jones (1991)	Walls Can Fall (1992)

Singles from And Along Came Jones
- 1. "You Couldn't Get the Picture" Released: August 1991; 2. "She Loved a Lot in Her Time" Released: December 1991

Professional ratings
Review scores
Source	Rating
Allmusic	2.5/5 stars

And Along Came Jones is an album by American country music singer George Jones released in 1991 on the MCA Nashville Records label.

== Reception ==
And Along Came Jones only made it to number 22 on the Billboard country albums chart but was greeted with positive reviews at the time. James Hunter of The New York Times wrote, "Jones may be singing better than ever right now. And Along Came Jones may be his most carefully crafted and selected album in a decade." AllMusic: "His MCA debut wasn't a masterpiece, but it was stronger than almost everything he'd done in the '80s."

== Track listing ==
No.	Title	Writer(s)	Length
1.	"Where the Tall Grass Grows"	Randy Boudreaux, Kerry Kurt Phillips, Andy Spooner	3:16
2.	"Honky Tonk Myself to Death"	Max D. Barnes	2:28
3.	"Angels Don't Fly"	John R. Fountain, William J. Webb	3:20
4.	"You Couldn't Get the Picture"	Chuck Harter	3:35
5.	"Come Home to Me"	Dobie Gray, Tom Lazaros, Bud Reneau	3:33
6.	"Heckel and Jeckel"	Max D. Barnes	3:28
7.	"I Don't Go Back Anymore"	Mike Reid, Troy Seals	3:15
8.	"You Done Me Wrong"	George Jones, Shirley Jones, Ray Price	2:27
9.	"King of the Mountain"	Larry Boone, Paul Nelson	3:27
10.	"She Loved a Lot in Her Time"	Randy Boudreaux, Sam Hogin, Kim Williams	3:12

== Personnel ==
- Eddie Bayers – drums (tracks 5, 8, and 10)
- Dennis Burnside – piano (tracks 2, 7)
- Larry Byrom – acoustic guitar (track 2)
- Mark Casstevens – acoustic guitar (tracks 1 and 4)
- Carol Chase – backing vocals
- Sonny Garrish – steel guitar (track 8)
- Steve Gibson – mandolin, electric guitar, 6-string bass
- Doyle Grisham – steel guitar (tracks 2 and 7)
- Rob Hajacos – fiddle (track 8)
- John Hughey – steel guitar (track 5)
- David Hungate – bass guitar
- Paul Leim – drums
- Chris Leuzinger – acoustic guitar (track 10)
- Terry McMillan – tambourine, harp, harmonica, cabasa
- Weldon Myrick – steel guitar (tracks 1, 3, 6, and 9)
- Mark O'Connor – fiddle
- Cindy Richardson-Walker – backing vocals
- Hargus "Pig" Robbins – piano
- Billy Joe Walker Jr. – electric guitar, acoustic guitar
- John Willis – electric guitar (track 2)
- Dennis Wilson – backing vocals
- Glenn Worf – bass guitar (track 8)
- Curtis "Mr. Harmony" Young – backing vocals
