= Easy Come, Easy Go (George Strait song) =

Single by George Strait

from the album Easy Come Easy Go
- B-side: "She Lays It All on the Line"
- Released: August 9, 1993
- Recorded: April 22, 1993
- Genre: Country
- Length: 3:04 (album version); 2:35 (single edit)
- Label: MCA54717
- Songwriters: Aaron Barker, Dean Dillon
- Producers: Tony Brown; George Strait

George Strait singles chronology
"When Did You Stop Loving Me" (1993)	"Easy Come, Easy Go" (1993)	"I'd Like to Have That One Back" (1993)

"Easy Come, Easy Go" is a song written by Aaron Barker and Dean Dillon, and recorded by American country music artist George Strait. It was released in August 1993 as the lead single from his album of the same title. The song reached the top of the Billboard Hot Country Singles & Tracks (now Hot Country Songs) chart and on the Canadian RPM Country Tracks chart. It peaked at number 71 on the U.S. Billboard Hot 100.

== Content ==
A breakup song, the narrator discusses how he and his lover have agreed to mutually end their relationship because they were not meant to be with each other.

== Chart performance ==
The song debuted at number 57 on the Hot Country Singles & Tracks chart dated August 21, 1993. It charted for 20 weeks on that chart, and spent two weeks at Number One on the chart dated October 23, 1993. It also peaked at number 71 on the Billboard Hot 100, becoming Strait's first entry on that chart.

=== Charts ===
Chart (1993)	Peak position
Canada Country Singles (RPM)	1
US Billboard Hot 100	71
US Hot Country Songs (Billboard)	1

=== Year-end charts ===
Chart (1993)	Position
Canada Country Tracks (RPM)	41
US Country Songs (Billboard)	6

== Certifications ==
Certifications for Easy Come, Easy Go
Region	Certification	Certified units/sales
United States (RIAA)	Gold	500,000^{‡}
^{‡} Sales+streaming figures based on certification alone.
