= Jim Lauderdale =

American musician (born 1957)

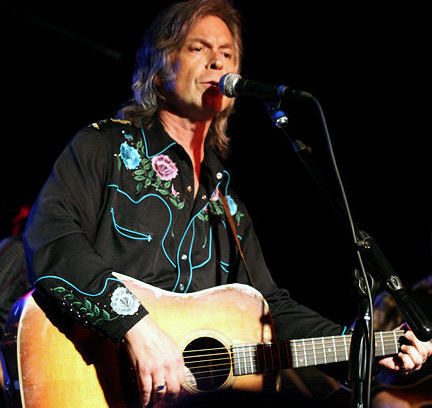
- Jim Lauderdale 2010

Background information
- Born: James Russell Lauderdale; April 11, 1957 (age 69); Troutman, North Carolina, United States
- Origin: Nashville, Tennessee
- Genres: Americana, Blues, Country, Bluegrass
- Occupations: Musician, singer-songwriter
- Instruments: Vocals guitar
- Years active: 1986–present
- Labels: Yep Roc, Sky Crunch, New West, Sugar Hill, Thirty Tigers, Dualtone, Proper
- Website: jimlauderdalemusic.com

James Russell Lauderdale (born April 11, 1957) is an American country, bluegrass, and Americana singer-songwriter. Since 1986, he has released 31 studio albums, including collaborations with artists such as Dr. Ralph Stanley, Buddy Miller, and Donna the Buffalo. A "songwriter's songwriter," his songs have been recorded by dozens of artists, notably George Strait, Gary Allan, Elvis Costello, Blake Shelton, the Dixie Chicks, Vince Gill, and Patty Loveless.

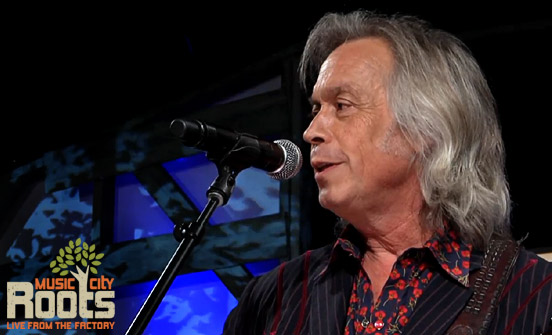
Jim Lauderdale hosting Music City Roots

== Early life ==
Lauderdale was born in Troutman, North Carolina, the son of Barbara Ann Lauderdale (née Hobson) and Dr. Wilbur "Chap" Chapman Lauderdale. Lauderdale's mother was originally from Kansas. In addition to her work as a public school and piano teacher, she was active in the Associate Reformed Presbyterian Churches in Troutman and Charlotte, North Carolina, and Due West, South Carolina, where she served as music director, church organist, and choir director. His father was born in Lexington, Virginia, the son of Reverend David Thomas and Sallie Ann Lauderdale (née Chapman). Lauderdale's father was a noted minister in the Associate Reformed Presbyterian Church. Lauderdale has one sister.

He grew up in Due West, South Carolina. Both of his parents were singers. He, too, sang in his early years, and learned the drums at 11, the harmonica at 13, and the banjo at 15. He has cited the influence of Ralph Stanley and bluegrass music from an early age. He played a variety of music, including bluegrass, Grateful Dead, and folk in a duo with best friend Nathan Lajoie as a teenager.

During his childhood in Due West, many music acts came to Erskine College. Lauderdale remembers enjoying the album Will the Circle be Unbroken by the Nitty Gritty Dirt Band and Neil Young's Harvest. He attended the Carolina Friends School in Durham, North Carolina, and then went on to the North Carolina School of the Arts in Winston-Salem, North Carolina, studying theater. He played in country and bluegrass bands during college.

Lauderdale is a long-time resident of Nashville, Tennessee.

== Career ==
Lauderdale at MerleFest in 2007

After graduating from college, Lauderdale lived in Nashville for five months in the summer of 1979 while he tried to get a recording or publishing deal. He hung out a lot with Roland White, an accomplished mandolin player, with whom he cut a record, but things never took off, so he decided to move to New York City, where he played in Floyd Domino's band and performed as a solo artist. In 1980, he met singer-songwriter Buddy Miller, and played in his band in the active twang music scene that was evolving at the time.

During his time in New York City, he also worked in the mailroom and as a messenger at Rolling Stone. He often was assigned to pick up and drop off photographer Annie Leibovitz's equipment.

Lauderdale joined the national touring production of Pump Boys and Dinettes, which eventually reached Los Angeles, where he met musicians Rosie Flores, Billy Bremmer, Pete Anderson, Lucinda Williams, Dale Watson, and others. John Ciambotti became Lauderdale's manager and Lauderdale relocated to Los Angeles in the late 1980s, recording an album for CBS (which was later released as The Point of No Return). The record was influenced by the Bakersfield sound of Buck Owens.

Armed with a catalog of a few hundred songs he had written, Lauderdale was able to get a publishing deal with a small company called Blue Water Music (based in Houston, with a small office in Nashville). Living in Los Angeles, he made a record with Anderson producing, but it was never released. Lauderdale then got a publishing deal with Reprise and moved into the second floor of Buddy and Julie Miller's house until he got his own place in Nashville.

In 2013, Lauderdale started his own record label, Sky Crunch, so he could release his many albums on a schedule that suited him. In April 2018, Lauderdale signed to Yep Roc Records.

=== Solo career ===
Lauderdale's solo debut, Planet of Love, produced by Rodney Crowell and John Leventhal, was released in 1991. Lost in the Lonesome Pines, a 2002 collaboration with Ralph Stanley, won the Grammy Award for Best Bluegrass Album. The Bluegrass Diaries won the same award in 2008. In 2003, Lauderdale was joined by roots/jam band Donna the Buffalo on the album Wait 'til Spring. His Could We Get Any Closer? was nominated for a Grammy in 2009.

In 2013, Lauderdale released Old Time Angels (a bluegrass album) and his first solo acoustic album, Blue Moon Junction, followed by Black Roses, with the North Mississippi All-Stars. Lauderdale appears on Laura Cantrell's 2013 release No Way There From Here. In 2014, the release of his album I'm A Song occurred. Lauderdale will release his new album Time Flies on August 3, 2018, along with Jim Lauderdale and Roland White.

=== Collaborations ===
In 2007, he began a collaboration with Larry Campbell, the band Olabelle, and others in the American Beauty Project, a loose collection of musicians dedicated to reimagining in performance the Grateful Dead's two classic 1970 albums, Workingman's Dead and American Beauty.

In 2011, Lauderdale toured with Hot Tuna, an ensemble act that included Jorma Kaukonen, Jack Casady, Barry Mitterhof, G.E. Smith, and for a time, Charlie Musselwhite. He has also toured with Elvis Costello, Rhonda Vincent, Mary Chapin Carpenter, and others.

==== Dr. Ralph Stanley ====
Lauderdale wrote and produced two bluegrass records with Ralph Stanley. Their first collaboration, I Feel Like Singing Today, was nominated for a Grammy.

==== Buddy Miller ====
Lauderdale released a record called Buddy and Jim with long-time friend and collaborator Buddy Miller in 2013. Lauderdale said they recorded it in three days in Miller's home studio. Miller did the mixing and producing.

==== Robert Hunter ====
Lauderdale has often collaborated with Grateful Dead lyricist Robert Hunter. Lauderdale's first collaboration with Hunter was Headed for the Hills and the second was Patchwork River in May 2010. The June 2011 release Reason and Rhyme was their third collaboration. Additionally, they wrote songs for a North Mississippi Allstars record that was released in the fall of 2013.

Two 2013 releases, Black Roses and Blue Moon Junction, were co-written with Hunter. Black Roses features North Mississippi Allstars' Cody and Luther Dickinson, whom Lauderdale met in Nashville at the Americana Music Festival, as well as Muscle Shoals musicians Spooner Oldham and David Hood. The album was recorded at their father Jim Dickinson's studio, Zebra Ranch, in Mississippi.

In 2013, Blue Moon Junction featured Lauderdale's work as a singer and songwriter, some of them co-written with Hunter in a solo, acoustic format. Lauderdale produced the record. Lauderdale says that they have more material that might make a good follow-up album, and hopes they will have time to collaborate again soon.

==== Nick Lowe ====
Lauderdale performed solo as the opening act for Nick Lowe on the latter's 1995 tour of the U.S. and Europe with the Impossible Birds. He later recorded with longtime members of Lowe's band and other British musicians at London's Goldtop Studio, sessions resulting in the 2017 album London Southern.

==== Roland White ====
On August 3, 2018, Lauderdale released Jim Lauderdale and Roland White, a previously lost record made with mandolin master Roland White. The disc was recorded in Earl Scruggs' basement in 1979, and the songs were only found recently by White's wife.

=== The Jim Lauderdale phenomenon ===
The term "the Jim Lauderdale phenomenon", coined by singer-songwriter Kim Richey and cited in an April 2000 article in The Tennessean by writer Peter Cooper, is an ironic reference to the fact that Lauderdale was nominated for a Grammy for his work with Stanley, but was released from a record deal with RCA not long after. He was also released from contracts with Warner Bros., Columbia, and Atlantic Records. The article notes that many country artists who were signed to major labels in the 1990s failed to get radio airtime and had their contracts dropped after making one or two albums. The problem became widespread in Nashville during this period, when good music was being created and recorded, but the megastars dominated the airwaves.

== Discography ==
Lauderdale has had a long-time, successful career on Music Row writing songs for many mainstream country music artists (and others), and has had four separate major-label record deals with CBS, Warner/Reprise, Atlantic, and RCA/BMG.

=== Songwriting ===
- Gary Allan: "Forever And A Day", "Wake Up Screaming", "What's On My Mind", "We Touched the Sun"
- Mark Chesnutt: "Gonna Get a Life" (co-written with Frank Dycus) – hit number one in 1995
- Elvis Costello: "I Lost You", "Poor Borrowed Dress"
- The Dixie Chicks: "Hole in My Head" (co-written with Buddy Miller)
- Sara Douga: "I'll Forgive You if You Don't" from Joe & Gin (2020) (co-written with Sara Douga)
- Dave Edmunds: "Halfway Down"
- Vince Gill: "Sparkle"
- Patty Loveless: "Halfway Down", "To Feel That Way at All", "You Don't Seem To Miss Me"
- George Strait:
  - "The King of Broken Hearts", "Where the Sidewalk Ends" from Pure Country Soundtrack (1992)
  - "I Wasn't Fooling Around", "Stay Out of My Arms" from Easy Come, Easy Go (1993)
  - "Nobody Has to Get Hurt", "What Am I Waiting For" from Lead On (1994)
  - "Do the Right Thing" from Blue Clear Sky (1996)
  - "We Really Shouldn't Be Doing This" from One Step at a Time (1998)
  - "One of You", "What Do You Say to That" from Always Never the Same (1999)
  - "Don't Make Me Come Over There (and Love You)" from George Strait (2000)
  - "Twang", "I Gotta Get to You" from Twang (2009)
  - "Two More Wishes" from Honky Tonk Time Machine (2019)
- Lee Ann Womack: "The King of Broken Hearts"
- Blake Shelton: "What's on My Mind"

=== Albums ===
Year	Album	Label	Featuring	Peak chart positions		
Year	Album	Label	Featuring	US Country	US Heat	US Grass
1991	Planet of Love	Reprise	Rodney Crowell and John Leventhal (co-producers)	—	—	—
1994	Pretty Close to the Truth	Atlantic		—	—	—
1995	Every Second Counts	Atlantic		—	—	—
1996	Persimmons	Rounder Select / Upstart		—	—	—
1997	Whisper	BNA	Harlan Howard, Melba Montgomery, Frank Dycus (songwriters)	—	—	—
1999	I Feel Like Singing Today	Rebel	Ralph Stanley & The Clinch Mountain Boys	—	—	—
1999	Onward Through It All	RCA		—	—	—
2001	The Other Sessions	Dualtone	Del Reeves, Harlan Howard, Melba Montgomery, Kostas, Clay Blaker (co-writers)	—	—	—
2001	Point of No Return: The Unreleased 1989 Album	Westside Records		—	—	—
2002	The Hummingbirds	Dualtone		—	—	—
2002	Lost in the Lonesome Pines	Dualtone	Ralph Stanley and the Clinch Mountain Boys	—	—	—
2003	Wait 'Til Spring	Dualtone	Donna the Buffalo	—	—	—
2004	Headed for the Hills	Dualtone	Robert Hunter (co-writer)	—	—	—
2006	Bluegrass	Yep Roc		—	—	—
2006	Country Super Hits Vol. 1	Yep Roc	Odie Blackmon, Leslie Satcher, Shawn Camp (co-writers)	—	—	—
2007	The Bluegrass Diaries	Yep Roc		—	—	10
2008	Honey Songs and the Dream Players	Yep Roc	James Burton (guitar), Ron Tutt (drums), Garry Tallent (bass), Glen D. Hardin (piano), Al Perkins (pedal steel); vocals: Emmylou Harris, Buddy Miller, Patty Loveless, Kelly Hogan	—	—	—
2009	Could We Get Any Closer?	Sky Crunch Records	Scott Vestal (banjo)	—	—	—
2010	Patchwork River	Thirty Tigers	Songs by Robert Hunter and Jim Lauderdale	47	38	—
2011	Reason and Rhyme	Sugar Hill	Bluegrass songs by Robert Hunter and Jim Lauderdale	—	—	9
2012	Carolina Moonrise	Compass	Bluegrass songs by Robert Hunter and Jim Lauderdale	—	—	15
2012	Buddy & Jim	New West	Buddy Miller	67	20	—
2013	Old Time Angels	Sky Crunch Records		—	—	—
2013	Black Roses	Sky Crunch Records / Smith Music Group	Songs by Robert Hunter and Jim Lauderdale	—	—	—
2013	Blue Moon Junction	Sky Crunch Records	Songs by Robert Hunter and Jim Lauderdale	—	—	—
2014	I'm a Song	Sky Crunch Records		—	—	—
2015	Soul Searching	Sky Crunch Records		—	—	—
2016	This Changes Everything	Sky Crunch Records		—	—	—
2017	London Southern	Proper Records		—	—	—
2018	Time Flies	Yep Roc Records		—	—	—
2018	Jim Lauderdale and Roland White	Yep Roc Records		—	—	—
2019	From Another World	Yep Roc Records	Sara Douga (co-writer)	—	—	—
2020	When Carolina Comes Home Again	Yep Roc Records	Sara Douga (co-writer)	—	—	—
2021	Hope	Yep Roc Records				
2022	Game Changer	Sky Crunch Records				
2023	The Long and Lonesome Letting Go	Sky Crunch Records	The Po' Ramblin' Boys			

=== Singles ===
Year	Single	US Country	Album
1988	"Stay Out of My Arms"	86	Point of No Return
1989	"Lucky 13"	—	Point of No Return
1991	"Maybe"	—	Planet of Love
1992	"I Wasn't Fooling Around"	—	Planet of Love
1992	"Wake Up Screaming"	—	Planet of Love
1999	"Still Not Out of the Woods"	—	Onward Through It All
2000	"If I Were You"	—	The Other Sessions
2002	"She's Looking at Me" (with Ralph Stanley)	—	Lost in the Lonesome Pines
2006	"I Met Jesus in a Bar"	—	Bluegrass
2007	"Who's Leaving Who?"	—	Bluegrass
2007	"There Goes Bessy Brown"	—	Bluegrass
2008	"This Is the Last Time (I'm Ever Gonna Hurt)"	—	The Bluegrass Diaries

=== Guest singles ===
Year	Single	Artist	Album
2009	"Love's Gonna Live Here"	Tanya Tucker	My Turn

=== Music videos ===
Year	Video	Director
1989	"Lucky 13"	Kevin Downs
1991	"Maybe	
1992	"Wake Up Screaming"	
1999	"Still Not Out of the Woods"	David McClister
2000	"If I Were You"	
2002	"She's Looking at Me" (with Ralph Stanley)	
2006	"I Met Jesus in a Bar"	David McClister
2007	"Who's Leaving Who?"	Travis Nicholson
2007	"There Goes Bessy Brown"	
2008	"This Is the Last Time (I'm Ever Gonna Hurt)"	Jarboe
2018	"Wild On Me"	
2019	"The Secrets of the Pyramids"	

=== Contributions ===
- A Town South of Bakersfield Vol. II (1988) – "What Am I Waiting For"
- Happy Birthday, Buck! A Texas Salute to Buck Owens (2002) – "Sweet Rosie Jones"
- Touch My Heart: A Tribute to Johnny Paycheck (2005) – "I Want You To Know"
- Born to the Breed: A Tribute to Judy Collins (2008) – "Easy Times"

== Other activities ==
Lauderdale has hosted the Americana Music Awards since winning their first Artist of the Year and Song of the Year awards in 2002. He was a judge for the second, 10th and 11th annual Independent Music Awards to support independent artists' careers. He is Honorary Chairperson for the Chris Austin Songwriting Contest each April at MerleFest in Wilkesboro, NC.

He hosted "The Jim Lauderdale Show" on WSM Radio. He hosts, along with Buddy Miller, "The Buddy & Jim Show" on SiriusXM Outlaw Country. Lauderdale is also a frequent host and performer on "Music City Roots", a weekly Americana music show web-streamed live from The Factory at Franklin just outside Nashville.

=== Jim Lauderdale: The King of Broken Hearts ===
A documentary film called Jim Lauderdale: The King of Broken Hearts, directed by Jeremy Dylan, was released in 2013. Using interviews with Elvis Costello, Buddy Miller, John Oates, Gary Allan, Tony Brown, and Jerry Douglas, the film describes Lauderdale's successes and failures as a recording artist.

First None recognized before	AMA Song of the Year (Songwriter); 2002	Succeeded by Trent Reznor
First None recognized before	AMA Artist of the Year; 2002	Succeeded by Johnny Cash
