= Carried Away (George Strait song) =

Single by George Strait

from the album Blue Clear Sky
- B-side: "Do the Right Thing"
- Released: June 3, 1996
- Recorded: September 25, 1995
- Genre: Country
- Length: 3:19 (album version); 2:58 (single edit)
- Label: MCA Nashville 55204
- Songwriters: Steve Bogard; Jeff Stevens
- Producers: Tony Brown; George Strait

George Strait singles chronology
"Blue Clear Sky" (1996)	"Carried Away" (1996)	"I Can Still Make Cheyenne" (1996)

"Carried Away" is a song written by Steve Bogard and Jeff Stevens and recorded by American country music artist George Strait. It was released in June 1996 as the second single from Strait's 1996 album Blue Clear Sky. In August of that year, it became Strait's 30th number one hit on the US Billboard Hot Country Singles and Tracks (now Hot Country Songs) chart. The song was one of two George Strait songs (the other being "One Night at a Time") to be nominated for Single of the Year at the 1997 Country Music Association awards. It was also nominated for Single Record and Song of the Year awards at the 32nd Academy of Country Music Awards that same year in 1997.

== Critical reception ==
Deborah Evans Price, of Billboard magazine reviewed the song favorably, saying that the strongest thing about the single is Strait's "heartfelt delivery." She goes on to say that "the melody is pretty, but the lyric just seems a little clichéd and unworthy of Strait's vocal gifts.

== Chart positions ==
"Carried Away" debuted at number 73 on the U.S. Billboard Hot Country Singles & Tracks for the week of May 18, 1996.

Chart (1996)	Peak position
Canada Country Singles (RPM)	2
US Hot Country Songs (Billboard)	1

=== Year-end charts ===
Chart (1996)	Position
Canada Country Tracks (RPM)	49
US Country Songs (Billboard)	18

== Certifications ==
Certifications for Carried Away
Region	Certification	Certified units/sales
United States (RIAA)	Platinum	1,000,000^{‡}
^{‡} Sales+streaming figures based on certification alone.
