= The Big One (George Strait song) =

Single by George Strait

from the album Lead On
- B-side: "No One but You"
- Released: September 19, 1994
- Recorded: April 19, 1994
- Genre: Country
- Length: 2:07
- Label: MCA 54938
- Songwriters: Gerry House, Devon O'Day
- Producers: Tony Brown & George Strait

George Strait singles chronology
"The Man in Love with You" (1994)	"The Big One" (1994)	"You Can't Make a Heart Love Somebody" (1994)

"The Big One" is a song written by Gerry House and Devon O'Day, and recorded by American country music artist George Strait. It was released in September 1994 as the lead single from his album Lead On. The song reached number one on the Billboard Hot Country Songs chart and number 4 on the Canadian RPM Country Tracks chart. It was his 26th number-one hit in the United States.

== Chart performance ==
"The Big One" debuted on the U.S. Billboard Hot Country Singles & Tracks for the week of October 8, 1994.

Chart (1994)	Peak position
Canada Country Singles (RPM)	4
US Hot Country Songs (Billboard)	1
