= I'd Like to Have That One Back =

Single by George Strait

from the album Easy Come Easy Go
- B-side: "That's Where My Baby Feels at Home"
- Released: November 29, 1993
- Recorded: April 21, 1993
- Genre: Country
- Length: 3:51
- Label: MCA 54767
- Songwriters: Aaron Barker; Bill Shore; Rick West
- Producers: Tony Brown; George Strait

George Strait singles chronology
"Easy Come, Easy Go" (1993)	"I'd Like to Have That One Back" (1993)	"Lovebug" (1994)

"I'd Like to Have That One Back" is a song recorded by American country music artist George Strait. It was released in November 1993 as the second single from his album Easy Come Easy Go. The song reached number 3 on the Billboard Hot Country Singles & Tracks chart in February 1994. It was written by Aaron Barker, Bill Shore and Rick West.

== Chart performance ==
"I'd Like to Have That One Back" debuted on the U.S. Billboard Hot Country Singles & Tracks for the week of December 4, 1993.

Chart (1993–1994)	Peak position
Canada Country Singles (RPM)	3
US Bubbling Under Hot 100 (Billboard)	9
US Hot Country Songs (Billboard)	3

=== Year-end charts ===
Chart (1994)	Position
Canada Country Tracks (RPM)	43
US Country Songs (Billboard)	57
