= The Man in Love with You =

Single by George Strait

from the album Easy Come Easy Go
- B-side: "We Must Be Loving Right"
- Released: June 14, 1994
- Recorded: April 19, 1993
- Genre: Country
- Length: 3:22
- Label: MCA54854
- Songwriters: Steve Dorff, Gary Harju
- Producers: Tony Brown & George Strait

George Strait singles chronology
"Lovebug" (1994)	"The Man in Love with You" (1994)	"The Big One" (1994)

"The Man in Love with You" is a song written by Steve Dorff and Gary Harju, and recorded by American country music artist George Strait. It was released in June 1994 as the fourth and final single from his album Easy Come Easy Go. It peaked at number 4 in the United States, and number 2 in Canada.

== Critical reception ==
Larry Flick, of Billboard magazine reviewed the song favorably, saying that "even up against a lush string section and a mean mess of chord changes, ol' George stays as cool as a cucumber."

== Music video ==
This is one of the few of Strait's singles that has a music video. It was directed by Bill Young.

== Chart positions ==
"The Man in Love with You" debuted at number 75 on the U.S. Billboard Hot Country Singles & Tracks for the week of June 25, 1994.

Chart (1994)	Peak position
Canada Country Singles (RPM)	2
US Hot Country Songs (Billboard)	4

=== Year-end charts ===
Chart (1994)	Position
Canada Country Tracks (RPM)	54
US Country Songs (Billboard)	49
