= Monty Holmes =

American country music singer-songwriter

- Origin: Lubbock, Texas
- Genres: Country
- Occupation: Singer-songwriter
- Years active: 1989–present
- Labels: Ashley, Bang II

Monty Holmes (born in Lubbock, Texas) is an American country music singer-songwriter. Holmes signed to Bang II Records and released his debut album, All I Ever Wanted, in 1998. His highest-charting single, "Why'd You Start Lookin' So Good," peaked at number 43 in 1998. Holmes' songs have been recorded by George Strait ("When Did You Stop Loving Me," "I Know She Still Loves Me," "Troubadour") and Lee Ann Womack ("Never Again, Again").

== Discography ==
=== Albums ===
Title	Album details
All I Ever Wanted	Release date: June 9, 1998; Label: Bang II Records

=== Singles ===
Year	Single	Peak positions	Album
Year	Single	US Country	Album
1989	"A Way to Survive"	82	—N/a
1998	"Why'd You Start Lookin' So Good"	43	All I Ever Wanted
1998	"Alone"	53	All I Ever Wanted
1998	"Leave My Mama Out of This"	59	All I Ever Wanted

=== Music videos ===
Year	Video	Director
1998	"Why'd You Start Lookin' So Good"	Steven Goldmann
1998	"Alone"	Bill Young
