= Love Bug (George Jones song) =

1965 single by George Jones

Single by George Jones

from the album New Country Hits
- B-side: "I Can't Get Used to Being Lonely"
- Released: 1965
- Genre: Country
- Length: 2:00
- Label: Musicor 1098
- Songwriters: Wayne Kemp; Curtis Wayne
- Producer: Pappy Daily

George Jones singles chronology
"Least of All" (1965)	"Love Bug" (1965)	"Take Me" (1965)

"Love Bug", also spelled "Lovebug," is a song by American country music artist George Jones. Jones' version, which also features a young Johnny Paycheck on backup vocals and draws heavily from the Bakersfield sound as popularized by Buck Owens, reached #6 on the Billboard Hot Country Songs chart in 1965. It was released on his July 1965 New Country Hits album and then re-released as the lead song for his 1966 album of the same name, Love Bug.

"Lovebug"

Single by George Strait

from the album Easy Come Easy Go
- B-side: "Just Look at Me"
- Released: February 28, 1994
- Recorded: April 19, 1993
- Genre: Country
- Length: 2:50
- Label: MCA 54819
- Songwriters: Wayne Kemp; Curtis Wayne
- Producers: Tony Brown; George Strait

George Strait singles chronology
"I'd Like to Have That One Back" (1993)	"Lovebug" (1994)	"The Man in Love with You" (1994)

== Recording and composition ==
"Love Bug" was written by Wayne Kemp and Curtis Wayne. Lyrically, the song celebrates the giddiness of new love that's "got the whole world shook up." Musically, the original Jones version is an unmistakable nod to the Bakersfield sound, from the treble on the guitars to George's elongated delivery at the start, "Oh...that...little bitty teeny weeny thing they call the love bug," which is reminiscent of Owens hits like "Love's Gonna Live Here" and "I've Got a Tiger By the Tail". Several alternate takes of the song can be heard on the Jones box set Walk Through This World with Me: The Complete Musicor Recordings 1965-1971, including a version with an overdriven electric guitar solo and harmonica that makes it sound more like a Rolling Stones record of the time than either Nashville or Bakersfield. Jones later recorded the song as a duet with Vince Gill on the 1994 album The Bradley Barn Sessions.

== Jack Jones version ==
American singer Jack Jones released a pop version of the song as a single in 1965. It reached No. 5 on the Billboard Easy Listening chart, and No. 73 on the magazine's Hot 100 chart. It also reached No. 56 in Cashbox and No. 6 on the Canadian Easy Listening charts. The track was included in his For the "In" Crowd album, with the front cover highlighting that the single was included in it.

== George Strait version ==
George Strait released a cover of the song in February 1994 as the third single from his album Easy Come Easy Go. Strait's version reached #8 on the Billboard Hot Country Singles & Tracks chart in May 1994.

== Chart performance ==
=== George Jones version ===
Chart (1965)	Peak position
US Hot Country Songs (Billboard)	6

=== Jack Jones version ===
Chart (1965)	Peak position
US Billboard Hot 100	71
US Cashbox Top 100 Singles	56
US Billboard Easy Listening	5
CAN RPM Adult Contemporary	6

=== George Strait version ===
"Love Bug" re-entered the U.S. Billboard Hot Country Singles & Tracks chart at number 74 as an official single for the week of March 5, 1994.

Chart (1994)	Peak position
Canada Country Singles (RPM)	9
US Bubbling Under Hot 100 (Billboard)	14
US Hot Country Songs (Billboard)	8
