= Blue Clear Sky (song) =

Single by George Strait

from the album Blue Clear Sky
- B-side: "I Ain't Never Seen No One Like You"
- Released: March 25, 1996
- Recorded: September 27, 1995
- Genre: Country; honky-tonk; Western
- Length: 2:52 (album version); 2:34 (single edit)
- Label: MCA 55187
- Songwriters: Bob DiPiero; John Jarrard; Mark D. Sanders
- Producers: Tony Brown; George Strait

George Strait singles chronology
"I Know She Still Loves Me" (1995)	"Blue Clear Sky" (1996)	"Carried Away" (1996)

"Blue Clear Sky" is a song written by Bob DiPiero, John Jarrard and Mark D. Sanders, and recorded by American country music singer George Strait. It was released in March 1996 as the first single and title track from Strait's album of the same name. "Blue Clear Sky" was recorded in Nashville, Tennessee at Emerald Studios. The song reached Number One on the Billboard Hot Country Singles & Tracks (now Hot Country Songs) charts.

== Background ==
Strait told Billboard that he loved the song when he first heard it, but he was also concerned. "I thought that 'Blue Clear Sky' didn't sound right to me, it should have been 'Clear Blue Sky.' Tony and I talked about it, and we came so close to messing it up. We finally called Bob DiPiero [one of the song's writers], and he said he got the line from Forrest Gump. Bob DiPiero writes in the GAC (Great American Country) featured article, Bob DiPiero Reveals The Story Behind "Blue Clear Sky" about the idea of the song. Bob says, "I went to see the movie "Forrest Gump." About halfway through the movie, Forest has a dialogue where he is talking about his girlfriend, Jenny. The dialogue went something like this...

"Jenny was gone, then all of a sudden, out of the blue clear sky, she was back."

Well, of course it's backwards. The real term is "out of the clear blue sky," but it grabbed my attention. The next day I was in a songwriting session with John Jarrard and Mark D. Sanders. I told them about this backwards idea and we wrote "Blue Clear Sky" about how love seems unfindable and then out of the blue, you find it."

== Cover versions ==
Country music singer Dierks Bentley covered the song from the television special George Strait: ACM Artist of the Decade All Star Concert.

== Critical reception ==
Deborah Evans Price, of Billboard magazine reviewed the song favorably, saying "that readily identifiable, likeable, warm Texas voice totally sells this sweet song about the joys of finding love." She discusses the "catchy, melodic introduction to the steel guitar weaving throughout this lively uptempo number." Her review was well received despite Erv Woolsey's (Erv Woolsey Talent Agency) statement, "He's [George Strait] becoming an event, and all he does is stand up there and sing", which may suggest that Strait could be seen as inactive up on stage.

== Chart performance ==
"Blue Clear Sky" debuted at number 41 on the U.S. Billboard Hot Country Singles & Tracks for the week of April 6, 1996.

Chart (1996)	Peak position
Canada Country Singles (RPM)	1
US Hot Country Songs (Billboard)	1

=== Year-end charts ===
Chart (1996)	Position
Canada Country Tracks (RPM)	17
US Country Songs (Billboard)	2

== Certifications ==
Region	Certification	Certified units/sales
United States (RIAA)	Platinum	1,000,000^{‡}
^{‡} Sales+streaming figures based on certification alone.
