= Aaron Barker =

American singer-songwriter (born 1953)

- Born: March 5, 1953 (age 73); San Antonio, Texas
- Genres: Country
- Occupation: Singer-songwriter
- Years active: 1988–present
- Label: Atlantic
- Website: Aaron Barker

Aaron Barker (born March 5, 1953, in San Antonio, Texas) is an American singer-songwriter.

Barker has written No. 1 songs for George Strait ("Baby Blue", "Love Without End, Amen", "Easy Come, Easy Go") and Lonestar ("What About Now"). His songs have also been recorded by Doug Supernaw, Clay Walker, Neal McCoy, Aaron Tippin and others. Barker turned "Love Without End, Amen" into a book in 2002. He was inducted into the Texas Heritage Songwriters' Hall of Fame in 2007.

Barker's debut album, The Taste of Freedom, was released by Atlantic Records in August 1992. The title track peaked at number 73 on the Billboard Hot Country Singles & Tracks chart.

Barker also writes and performs commercials for Blue Bell Ice Cream.

On August 8, 2016, it was announced at a private press conference that Barker would be inducted into the Nashville Songwriters Hall of Fame at a ceremony held on October 9, 2016.

== Discography ==
=== Albums ===
Title	Album details
The Taste of Freedom	Release date: August 4, 1992; Label: Atlantic Records
Straight from the Horse's Mouth (with Curtis Wayne)	Release date: 1998; Label: BSW Records
Lifelines	Release date: 2002; Label: self-released
Echoes	Release date: October 17, 2006; Label: self-released

=== Singles ===
Year	Single	Peak positions	Album
Year	Single	US Country	Album
1992	"The Taste of Freedom"	73	The Taste of Freedom

=== Music videos ===
Year	Video
1992	"The Taste of Freedom"

== List of singles written by Aaron Barker ==
Year	Single	Artist	Co-writer(s)	Peak positions
Year	Single	Artist	Co-writer(s)	US Country
1988	"Baby Blue"	George Strait		1
1990	"Love Without End, Amen"	George Strait		1
1992	"What A Friday Night Is For"	Jessica Bouche		--
1992	"The Taste Of Freedom"	Aaron Barker		73
1993	"Honky Tonkin' Fool"	Doug Supernaw		50
1993	"Easy Come, Easy Go"	George Strait	Dean Dillon	1
1993	"I'd Like to Have That One Back"	George Strait	Bill Shore, Rick West	3
1995	"Not Enough Hours in the Night"	Doug Supernaw	Ron Harbin, Kim Williams	3
1995	"Dallas Morning Blues"	Ram Herrera	Sonny La Maire	--
1995	"I Know She Still Loves Me"	George Strait	Monty Holmes	5
1996	"I Can Still Make Cheyenne"	George Strait	Erv Woolsey	4
1997	"Watch This"	Clay Walker	Ron Harbin, Anthony L. Smith	4
1998	"Love Happens Like That"	Neal McCoy	Ron Harbin, Anthony L. Smith	29
1998	"You're Beginning to Get to Me"	Clay Walker	Tom Shapiro	1
1998	"I'm A Cowboy"	Bill Engvall	Bill Engvall	60
1999	"I'm Leaving"	Aaron Tippin	Ron Harbin, David Lewis	17
1999	"Christmas Cookies"	George Strait		33
	"Peace Of Mind"	George Strait	Dean Dillon	74
	"Terrible Twos"	Damon Gray	Michael Garvin	73
2000	"What About Now"	Lonestar	Ron Harbin, Anthony L. Smith	1
	"Old Time Christmas"	George Strait	John Barlow Jarvis	62
2008	"What A Friday Night Is For"	Jessica Boucher		
2013	"Best Seat in the House"	LoCash Cowboys	Preston Brust, Chris Lucas	52
2013	"I'm Gonna Lie"	Philip Claypool	Gary Hannan, Ira Dean	—
2015	"Suffer In Peace"	Tyler Farr	Phil O'Donnell	3
"—" denotes releases that did not chart
