= Pure Country (franchise) =

Film series

- Official film series logo
- Production companies: Jerry Weintraub Productions (1); Angry Monkey Entertainment (2); Roserock Films (2); WWE Studios (3)
- Distributed by: Warner Bros. Pictures (1-2); Warner Bros. Home Entertainment (3)
- Release dates: October 23, 1992 (1); October 15, 2010 (2); August 1, 2017 (3)
- Country: United States
- Language: English

The Pure Country franchise consists of American country-musical western dramas, including two theatrical movies (including the 1992 original and its sequel), a straight-to-home video sequel, and a musical adaptation. The trilogy of standalone films includes the contrast the lifestyle of country music fame to working class lifestyle.

The films were met overall with middling degrees of critical reception, while also earning enough income for the associate studios to create additional installments. Some retrospective reviews have rated the films more favorably since their initial release.

The first two films in the series were released by Warner Bros. Pictures; as the third was a direct to home video, it was released by Warner Bros. Home Entertainment. Each entry in the trilogy was accompanied by a soundtrack release. The soundtrack for the first film sold well and became George Strait's most commercially successful album. Rex McGee, who wrote the script for the first Pure County film, went on to create a stage musical adaptation of the film.

== Films ==
| Film | U.S. release date | Director | Screenwriter(s) | Producer |
|---|---|---|---|---|
| Pure Country | October 23, 1992 | Christopher Cain | Rex McGee | Jerry Weintraub |
| Pure Country 2: The Gift | October 15, 2010 | Christopher Cain | Dean Cain & Christopher Cain | Scott Duthie, Christopher Cain and Hunt Lowry |
| Pure Country: Pure Heart | August 1, 2017 | Damon Santostefano | Holly Goldberg Sloan | Hunt Lowry, Patty Reed, Michael J. Luisi and Todd Williams |

=== Pure Country (1992) ===
Wyatt "Dusty" Chandler, who has established his career as one of the most successful country music stars, grows disenchanted with the repetition of area-filled stage shows and life on the road. Despite his contractual obligations, Dusty leaves his Hollywood lifestyle and returns to the smalltown where he grew up. As his producer searches for him, Dusty enjoys his return to country living. As he continues to enjoy working as a farmhand at a ranch Dusty begins to fall in love with the owner's daughter named Harley Tucker, he must determine whether to return to his stardom or to continue their lives together.

=== Pure Country 2: The Gift (2010) ===
A talented smalltown woman named Bobbie makes a promise to her ailing Aunt Ellie that should she achieve her dreams as a country music star, she will always remain true to the values she was raised to believe. Upon moving to Nashville to pursue her career, Bobbie begins to compromise her beliefs in hopes to land a recording contract with established record producers. As she enjoys the experiences she has always hoped for, Bobbie is faced with a choice of being true to herself or maintaining a façade for the sake of fame.

=== Pure Country: Pure Heart (2017) ===
Two high school aged sisters named Ada and Piper Spencer share an appreciation for country music, and their goals of one day achieving their goals in the country music scene. Though they regularly attempt to turn their musical talents into a career, their widowed-mother forbids it. As the pair secretly pursue their dreams in Nashville and begin to establish themselves as a promising duo act, they soon discover that country music is legacy because their father was a rising country star. Ada and Piper are faced with revealing their secretive adventures to their mother and forfeiting their progress, or continuing to maintain their ongoing activities.

== Main cast and characters ==
List indicators

This section includes characters who will appear or have appeared in the franchise in main roles.

- An empty grey cell indicates the character was not in the film, or that the character's official presence has not yet been confirmed.
- ^{C} indicates a cameo role.
- ^{V} indicates a voice-only role.

| Character | Films | | |
| Character | Pure Country | Pure Country 2: The Gift | Pure Country: Pure Heart |
|---|---|---|---|
| Wyatt "Dusty" Chandler | George Strait | | |
| Harley Tucker | Isabel Glasser | | |
| Lula Rogers | Lesley Ann Warren | | |
| Buddy Jackson | Kyle Chandler | | |
| Earl Blackstock | John Doe | | |
| Ernest Tucker | Rory Calhoun | | |
| Tim Tucker | James Terry McIlvain | | |
| J.W. Tucker | Toby Metcalf | | |
| Grandma Ivy Chandler | Molly McClure | | |
| Bobbie Thomas | | Katrina Elam Kaitlyn Dorff^{Y} | |
| Dale Jordan | | Travis Fimmel | |
| Aunt Ella | | Jackie Welch | |
| Molly Thomas | | Heidi Brook Myers^{P} | |
| Roy Thomas | | J.D. Parker | |
| Morita | | Michael Yama | |
| Peter the angel | | Michael McKean | |
| Joseph the angel | | Bronson Pinchot | |
| Pedro the angel | | Cheech Marin | |
| Keith Haskins | | Todd Truley | |
| George Strait | | himself | |
| Ada Spencer | | | Kaitlyn Bausch |
| Piper Spencer | | | Cozi Zuehlsdorff |
| Justine Sloan | | | Dara Sisterhen |
| Elizabeth Spencer | | | Amanda Detmer |
| Declan Martino | | | Matthew Barnes |
| Marq Dunn | | | Laura Bell Bundy |
| "Meemaw" Spencer | | | Myra Turley |
| Henry Monroe | | | Lawrence Turner |
| C.J. Simms | | | Ronny Cox |
| Ted | | | Shawn Michaels |
| Willie Nelson | | | himself |

== Production ==
Development for Pure Country began in 1991 and filming took place during mid-1992 in Maypearl, Texas, with additional scenes shot in Mansfield, Midlothian, Cresson, and Fort Worth. Concert scenes were shot in Fort Worth in May 1992; in order to gather enough people to fill the Will Rogers Auditorium tickets were distributed via Blockbuster stores and Rainbow-TicketMaster outlets. Christopher Cain was brought on to direct a script written by Rex McGee, while Jerry Weintraub served as producer. Steve Dorff served as the composer for some of the music in Pure Country and penned the song "Heartland" alongside John Bettis. Dorff would later return to compose the music for Pure Country 2: The Gift.

Christopher Cain began working on the script for Pure Country 2 around 1995 with his son, actor Dean Cain. McGee, who did not participate in the screenwriting process for either of the two sequels, has stated that neither the second nor the third film were written as sequels and that the Pure Country title was applied after the scripts were picked up by Warner Bros. LeAnn Rimes was initially approached to serve as the film's star, but declined, causing the project to get shelved until the late 2000s. Filming began in late 2009 in Nashville and a ranch in Lebanon, Tennessee. Katrina Elam was brought in to portray the central character of Bobbie. George Strait was brought in for a cameo role as himself and did not reprise his character of Dusty from the first film. Scott Duthie, Christopher Cain and Hunt Lowry served as producers.

Plans to film Pure Country: Pure Heart were announced in early 2017 and that it would be produced by WWE Studios. Shawn Michaels was confirmed as performing alongside Willie Nelson and Laura Bell Bundy. Filming took place in New Orleans, Louisiana and Nashville, Tennessee.

== Release ==
The first two films were given theatrical releases. Pure Country was given a wide theatrical release on October 23, 1992, while Pure Country 2: The Gift received a limited theatrical release on October 15, 2010. Neither film was released outside of North America.

Pure Country: Pure Heart was not given a theatrical release but did receive a screening at the Stagecoach Festival in Indio, California on April 30, 2017. It subsequently released straight to home video on DVD, Blu-ray, and Digital HD on August 1 of the same year.

== Reception ==
=== Box office and financial performance ===
During its opening week Pure Country screened in 993 theaters and had an opening box office of $2,739,680. Per Box Office Mojo, the movie stayed in theaters until the week of December 4, 1992 and had a total domestic gross of $15,164,458. During its limited theatrical release Pure Country 2: The Gift received a total domestic box office earnings of $133,771.

Pure Country: Pure Heart was released straight to DVD and per Rentrak Corp and King Features Syndicate, the movie was one of the top 10 DVD sales for the weeks of August 25 and September 3, 2017.

| Film | Box office gross | | | Box office ranking | | Total home video sales | Budget | Worldwide net total income | Ref. |
| Film | North America | Other territories | Worldwide | All-time North America | All-time worldwide | Total home video sales | Budget | Worldwide net total income | Ref. |
|---|---|---|---|---|---|---|---|---|---|
| Pure Country | $15,164,458 | —N/a | $15,164,458 | #4,473 | #6,273 | Information not publicly available | $10,000,000 | >$5,164,458 | |
| Pure Country 2: The Gift | $133,771 | —N/a | $133,771 | #12,109 | #22,392 | Information not publicly available | Information not publicly available | ≤ $133,771 | |
| Totals | $15,298,229 | —N/a | $15,298,229 | x̄ #5,527 | x̄ #9,555 | >$0 | >$10,000,000 | ≥$5,298,229 | |

=== Critical and public response ===
The films were met overall with middling degrees of critical reception, while also earning enough income for the associate studios to create additional installments. Pure Country did not receive an overwhelmingly positive reception upon its initial release and Rolling Stone stated that the film was "lambasted by most reviewers". As of 2024, the film holds a rating of 41% on Rotten Tomatoes, based on 22 reviews. Retrospective reviews, such as one from Rotten Tomatoes editor Nathan Rabin were more favorable. Rabin stated that while the film was not a hit during its initial release, that it "has a distinct cult among people like my father-in-law, a South African neurologist in suburban Atlanta who loves nothing more than to pick up a guitar while howling a Bob Dylan song." Audiences polled by CinemaScore gave the film a rating of A−.

Pure Country 2: The Gift released to an also middling response; Variety and The Oklahoman were both critical of the film while Dove.org and The Dallas Morning News were more favorable. It also performed lower at the box office than its predecessor. Pure Country: Pure Heart received reviews from The Spokesman-Review and Common Sense Media, both of which rated it at three stars. Common Sense Media's Renee Schonfeld also gave the film three stars, stating that "The movie isn't original, but it's entertaining enough, the music is fun, and resolution comes easily."

Wide Open Country's Addie Moore did a retrospective on both Pure Country: Pure Heart and Pure Country 2: The Gift in 2020. In her article she opined that the third film felt "more like a continuation of the second film than the original" but that the story would be relatable to young women. She also noted that "Like the previous two movies, it was never confused as Oscar material, but its heart was in the right place."

== Tie-in media ==
A soundtrack has been released alongside each entry in the Pure Country series and a stage musical adaptation of the first movie premiered in 2017.

=== Soundtracks ===
The first Pure Country was released as both the soundtrack album for the 1992 film and the thirteenth studio album by American country music singer George Strait. It was released on September 15, 1992 by MCA Records. The album was given a rating of 3.5/5 by AllMusic, a C− by Entertainment Weekly, and 3/5 by Q magazine. Two music videos were created for the album, for the songs "I Cross My Heart" and "Heartland", both of which charted on Billboard. The soundtrack placed on multiple charts, including US Billboard 200. The soundtrack is Strait's best selling album and sold over six million copies.

The soundtrack for Pure Country 2: The Gift was released by WaterTower Music on February 15, 2011, featuring songs from the film by Katrina Elam. Prior to this the song "Dream Big" was released as a single in 2010 and per Crosswalk.com, received some radio airtime. At its peak position, the album placed at #55 on the U.S. Billboard Top Country Albums and at 44 on the U.S. Billboard Top Heatseekers.

A soundtrack was released for Pure Country: Pure Heart in 2017 through WaterTower Music and featured music by Willie Nelson, Kaitlyn Bausch, and Cozi Zuehlsdorff, among others.

== Stage musical ==
Rex McGee, who wrote the screenplay for the first Pure Country film, began working on a stage musical adaptation in the mid to late 2000s. The musical was to have a Broadway release in 2009 and feature songs from the film alongside new lyrics and music created by John Bettis and Steve Dorff, both of whom worked on the soundtrack for the original film. The musical received a staged reading on May 7, 2007, at New World Stages and featured Will Chase, Carlin Glynn, Cady Huffman, James Moye, and Danny Rutigliano in unspecified roles. The Broadway production, which did not come to fruition, was to have starred Joe Nichols and Lorrie Morgan.

Work continued on the musical and on June 9, 2017 the musical had its world premiere at the Irving Arts Center's Carpenter Performance Hall outside of Dallas, using the book and songs written for the Broadway release. The date was chosen to coincide with a 25 year anniversary celebration for the film, which would be used as a lead up to the musical's premiere. The musical followed the story of the original film and Harley Jay originated the role of Dusty in the stage musical. Plans were made to perform the musical as part of the 2019-2020 season for the Houston-based theater company Theatre Under The Stars. The production was delayed and then cancelled due to the COVID-19 pandemic; if it had run as planned the production would have featured Levi Kreis in the lead role, accompanied by Sally Mayes, Stephanie Gibson, and Felicia Finley.
