= List of Top Country Albums number ones of 1993 =

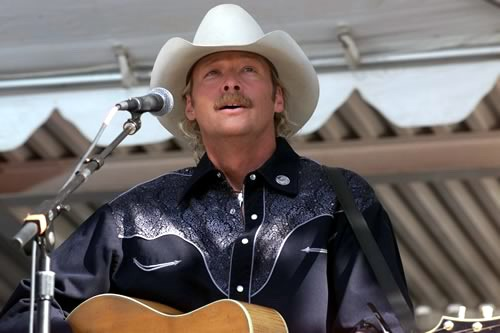
Alan Jackson topped the chart for the first time with the album A Lot About Livin' (And a Little 'bout Love). He also appeared on the compilation album Common Thread: The Songs of the Eagles, which was the year's final number one.

Top Country Albums is a chart that ranks the top-performing country music albums in the United States, published by Billboard. In 1993, nine different albums topped the chart, based on electronic point of sale data provided by SoundScan Inc.

In the issue of Billboard dated January 2, Garth Brooks was at number one with The Chase, the album's 13th week at number one. It held the top spot for three further weeks for a final total of 16 weeks atop the chart, meaning that Brooks had spent 90 weeks at number one in less than three years. In the fall, he returned to number one with his next album In Pieces, which spent seven weeks in the top spot. Brooks experienced a level of mainstream popularity and success in the early 1990s unprecedented for a country artist, making him one of the biggest-selling acts not only within the country market but across all genres. Billy Ray Cyrus also had two chart-toppers in 1993. In the issue of Billboard dated January 30, he returned to the top spot with Some Gave All, which had already spent 18 weeks at number one in 1992. In its second spell in the top spot, the album added a further 16 weeks to its total; its final total of 34 weeks in the top spot was the third-highest figure in the chart's history to date. Cyrus returned to number one in July with the album It Won't Be the Last; this would prove to be his final Top Country Albums number one.

In July, George Strait spent a single week at number one with Pure Country, the soundtrack to the film of the same name in which he starred. It was the first soundtrack album to top the country albums chart for more than ten years. The following month, Alan Jackson gained his first number one with A Lot About Livin' (And a Little 'bout Love). Jackson would go on to become one of the most successful country stars of the 1990s, achieving five consecutive number ones on the albums chart between 1993 and 1998, and would remain a regular in the upper reaches of the chart well into the 21st century. The year's final chart-topper was Common Thread: The Songs of the Eagles, a charity compilation album featuring various country artists performing songs originally recorded by the Eagles. Alan Jackson was the only artist who achieved a number one in his own right in 1993 and also appeared on the album, which held the top spot for the final eight weeks of the year.

== Chart history ==
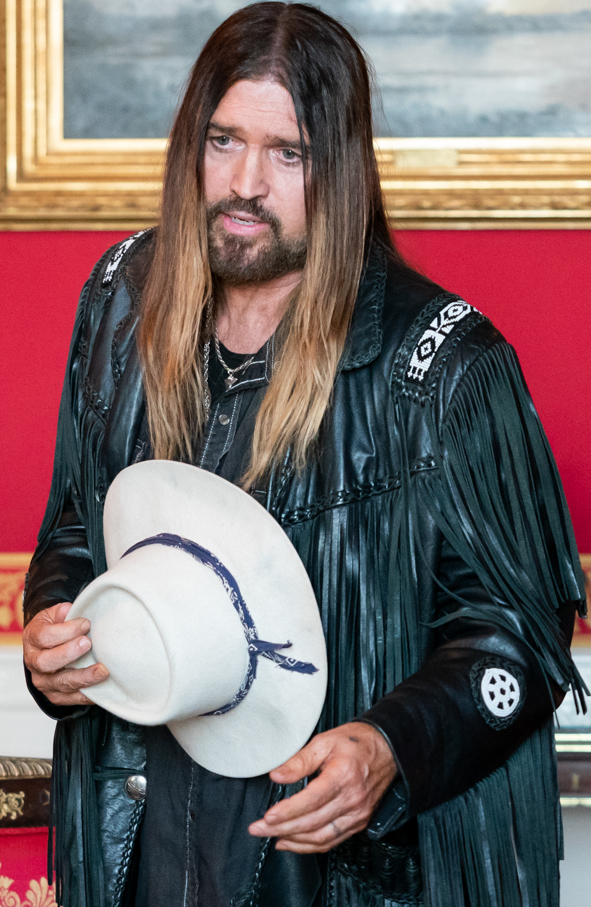
Billy Ray Cyrus spent 16 weeks at number one with Some Gave All, which had already spent 18 weeks in the top spot in the previous year.

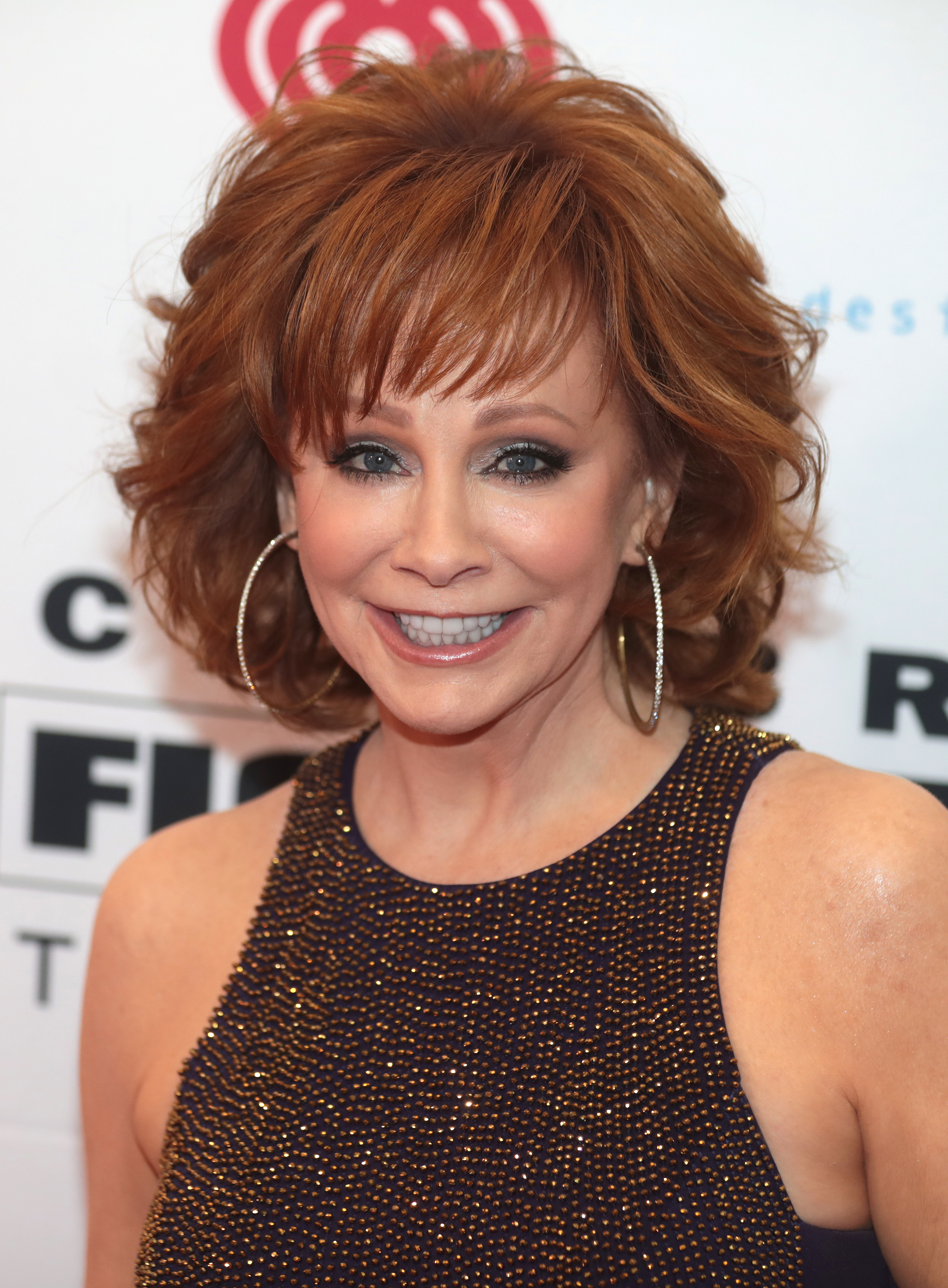
It's Your Call was a number one for Reba McEntire.

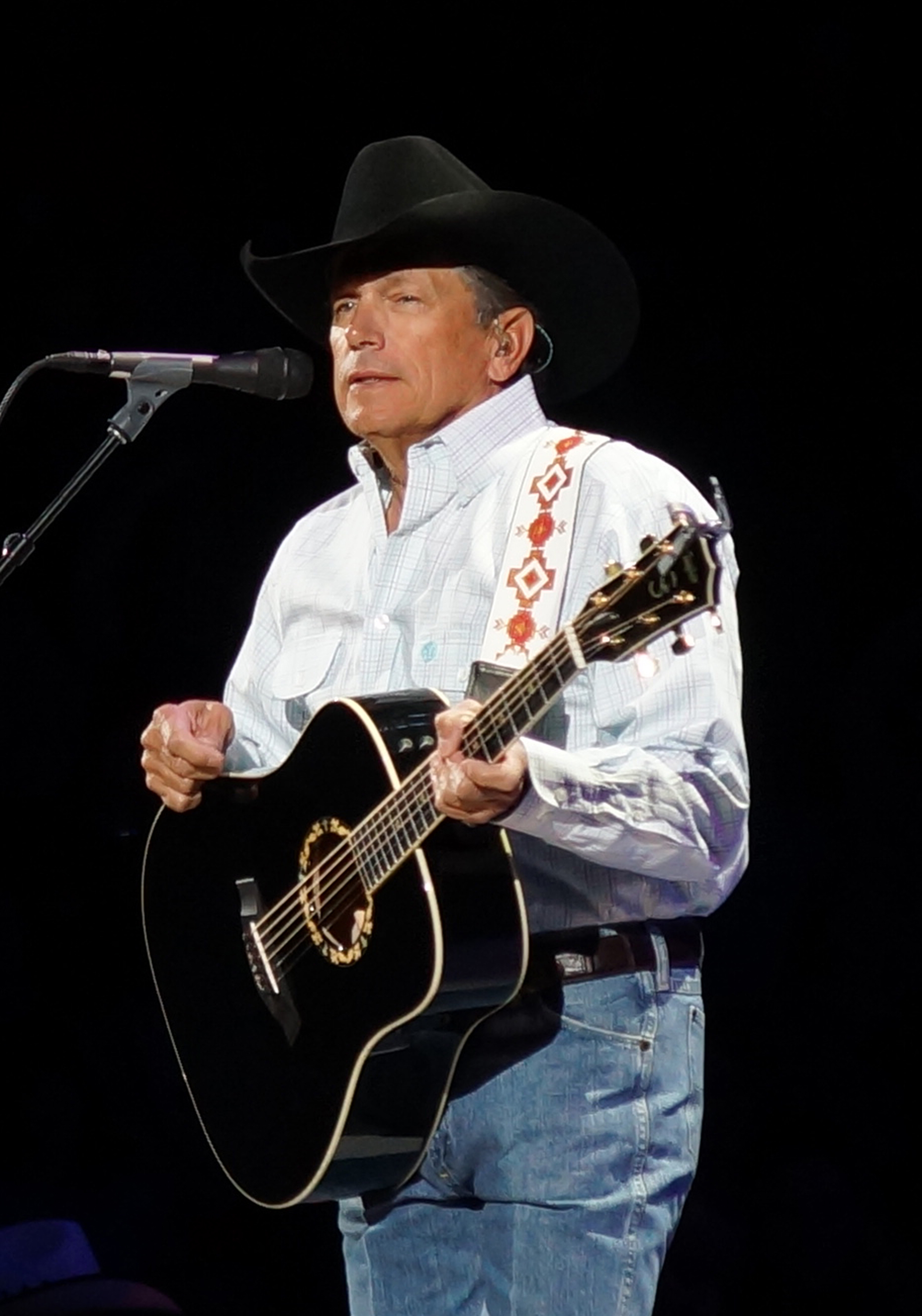
George Strait topped the chart with the soundtrack album Pure Country.

Issue date	Title	Artist(s)	Ref.
January 2	The Chase	Garth Brooks	
January 9	The Chase	Garth Brooks	
January 16	The Chase	Garth Brooks	
January 23	The Chase	Garth Brooks	
January 30	Some Gave All	Billy Ray Cyrus	
February 6	Some Gave All	Billy Ray Cyrus	
February 13	Some Gave All	Billy Ray Cyrus	
February 20	Some Gave All	Billy Ray Cyrus	
February 27	Some Gave All	Billy Ray Cyrus	
March 6	Some Gave All	Billy Ray Cyrus	
March 13	Some Gave All	Billy Ray Cyrus	
March 20	Some Gave All	Billy Ray Cyrus	
March 27	Some Gave All	Billy Ray Cyrus	
April 3	Some Gave All	Billy Ray Cyrus	
April 10	Some Gave All	Billy Ray Cyrus	
April 17	Some Gave All	Billy Ray Cyrus	
April 24	Some Gave All	Billy Ray Cyrus	
May 1	Some Gave All	Billy Ray Cyrus	
May 8	Some Gave All	Billy Ray Cyrus	
May 15	Some Gave All	Billy Ray Cyrus	
May 22	It's Your Call	Reba McEntire	
May 29	Tell Me Why	Wynonna	
June 5	Tell Me Why	Wynonna	
June 12	Tell Me Why	Wynonna	
June 19	Tell Me Why	Wynonna	
June 26	Tell Me Why	Wynonna	
July 3	Pure Country	George Strait	
July 10	It Won't Be the Last	Billy Ray Cyrus	
July 17	It Won't Be the Last	Billy Ray Cyrus	
July 24	It Won't Be the Last	Billy Ray Cyrus	
July 31	It Won't Be the Last	Billy Ray Cyrus	
August 7	It Won't Be the Last	Billy Ray Cyrus	
August 14	A Lot About Livin' (And a Little 'bout Love)	Alan Jackson	
August 21	A Lot About Livin' (And a Little 'bout Love)	Alan Jackson	
August 28	A Lot About Livin' (And a Little 'bout Love)	Alan Jackson	
September 4	A Lot About Livin' (And a Little 'bout Love)	Alan Jackson	
September 11	A Lot About Livin' (And a Little 'bout Love)	Alan Jackson	
September 18	In Pieces	Garth Brooks	
September 25	In Pieces	Garth Brooks	
October 2	In Pieces	Garth Brooks	
October 9	In Pieces	Garth Brooks	
October 16	In Pieces	Garth Brooks	
October 23	In Pieces	Garth Brooks	
October 30	In Pieces	Garth Brooks	
November 6	Common Thread: The Songs of the Eagles	Various Artists	
November 13	Common Thread: The Songs of the Eagles	Various Artists	
November 20	Common Thread: The Songs of the Eagles	Various Artists	
November 27	Common Thread: The Songs of the Eagles	Various Artists	
December 4	Common Thread: The Songs of the Eagles	Various Artists	
December 11	Common Thread: The Songs of the Eagles	Various Artists	
December 18	Common Thread: The Songs of the Eagles	Various Artists	
December 25	Common Thread: The Songs of the Eagles	Various Artists	
