= Pure Country (disambiguation) =

Pure Country is a 1992 film starring George Strait.

Pure Country may also refer to:

- Pure Country (soundtrack), a soundtrack album from the film, by George Strait
- Pure Country (radio network), a Canadian radio network
- PureCountry, a radio station operated by the Australian Radio Network
