= No End in Sight (disambiguation) =

No End in Sight is a 2007 documentary film.

No End in Sight may also refer to:

- No End in Sight (This Is Menace album), 2006
- No End in Sight (Pro-Pain album), 2008
- No End in Sight: The Very Best of Foreigner, a 2008 album by Foreigner
- "No End in Sight" (song), by Katrina Elam, 2004
- "No End in Sight", a song by Killswitch Engage from the album Disarm the Descent, 2013
