= Pure Country =

1992 film by Christopher Cain

- Theatrical release poster
- Directed by: Christopher Cain
- Written by: Rex McGee
- Produced by: Jerry Weintraub
- Starring: George Strait; Lesley Ann Warren; Isabel Glasser
- Cinematography: Richard Bowen
- Edited by: Jack Hofstra
- Music by: Steve Dorff
- Production company: Jerry Weintraub Productions
- Distributed by: Warner Bros.
- Release date: October 23, 1992
- Running time: 112 minutes
- Country: United States
- Language: English
- Budget: $10 million
- Box office: $15.2 million

Pure Country is a 1992 American drama musical Western film. It was directed by Christopher Cain and stars country music singer George Strait in his acting debut, with Lesley Ann Warren, Isabel Glasser and Kyle Chandler. The film, while profitable with box office receipts of over $15 million against a $10 million budget, had a critical reception generally for its storyline, although some critics spoke favorably of Strait's acting performance. The movie's corresponding soundtrack, recorded entirely by Strait, was a commercial success as well, certifying six times platinum by the Recording Industry Association of America and charting three singles for Strait.

The movie's success led to its expansion into the titular film series, including two sequels as well as a stage musical of the film which debuted in 2017.

== Plot ==
At the beginning of the movie, we see an audience shouting "Dusty!", a band begins to play that is full of smoke and lights, and Wyatt "Dusty" Chandler enters the stage to perform his songs. Dusty feels that his elaborate stage show is overwhelming his music, a suspicion confirmed one night when he omits several bars of a chart-topping hit, "Where the Sidewalk Ends". When his fans don't notice, Dusty's performance was cut short. Dusty has a conversation with his drummer and best friend, Earl Blackstock. Without telling his manager, Lula, he decides to take a walk, but does not say exactly where he is going or for how long. Dusty was waiting for his truck, and he hitches a ride. After shaving his beard and cutting off his ponytail, Dusty heads for the small farm town where he grew up, visiting his wise old grandmother. Later that day, he visits a bar where he and Earl played prior to making it big.

That evening, Buddy Jackson (a member of Dusty's road crew) comes on stage posing as Dusty, and lip-syncing to a recording of Dusty, the band wasn't very happy for Lula for letting Buddy pose as Dusty, rather than cancel the concert. Meanwhile, in a down home bar, Dusty hangs around for some relaxation and discovers Harley Tucker dancing and smiling at Dusty. Al, Harley's drunk and rugged friend, get into an argument in the parking lot over Dusty, who neither have ever seen or met. Dusty, while drunk, comes to assist Harley with Al, who won't stop bothering her. Al punches Dusty, and he falls to the ground. Harley brings him home, a reward for defending her honor. While Dusty is enjoying his new freedom, his concert in Shreveport was canceled. Meanwhile, Dusty stays on at the ranch, paying room and board and taking roping lessons, all the while earning the respect of Harley's father, Ernest. Ernest confides in Dusty that he is forced to slowly sell pieces of the ranch. Harley is determined to save the struggling spread with victory in a Las Vegas rodeo.

Buddy confronts Lula after his performance and demands $100,000 and a recording contract. He lies to the media that Lula paid him to keep imitating Dusty. Lula, realizing she's in trouble, reaches out to Earl to find Dusty. She then follows him to Dusty's location. Realizing he has feelings for Harley and will not leave, Lula tells Harley that Dusty is married to her. Harley dumps Dusty and Lula is waiting to scoop him up to return to his band and career. Now back with his band, he demands that his stage shows be toned down. Dusty ever shows his face in country music again, but he'll sue him, so he gets mad at Buddy due to telling about the lie he told the press about Lula offering him money and a recording contract to let Buddy pose as Dusty, so Dusty tells Buddy to go on and get him out of here. Lula is grateful for his intervention to which Dusty brings up Harley's name. After Dusty's band left Shreveport, they head to Las Vegas where Harley Tucker competed the rodeo. Lula secretly arranges for Harley and her family to get tickets to Dusty's concert. Once seated she sends an attendant to get Harley where she admits the truth to her. At the end of the movie, he does the show without all the smoke and the lights, and sits on the edge of the stage, playing guitar and singing "I Cross My Heart", a special love song he has composed for her, which wins Harley's forgiveness, the two hug at the edge of the stage after his performance.

== Cast and characters ==
- George Strait as Wyatt "Dusty" Chandler
- Lesley Ann Warren as Lula Rogers
- Isabel Glasser as Harley Tucker
- Kyle Chandler as Buddy Jackson
- John Doe as Earl Blackstock
- Rory Calhoun as Ernest Tucker
- Molly McClure as Grandma Ivy Chandler
- James Terry McIlvain as Tim Tucker
- Toby Metcalf as J.W. Tucker
- Mark Walters as Al

== Production ==
Pure Country was filmed in 1991 throughout Texas, but mostly in Maypearl.

The graveyard scene was shot at Cresson Cemetery in Cresson, Texas, and the concert sequences were filmed at concert venues in Fort Worth, including North Side Coliseum and Will Rogers Coliseum.

The bar scenes where Dusty meets Harley were filmed at Western Kountry Klub, located between Midlothian and Mansfield Tx.

== Box office ==
Despite Strait's popularity in the music world, Pure Country only grossed $15 million at the box office. Although the expectations had been higher for Strait's first major film role, this did not stop the soundtrack album from becoming the best-selling album of Strait's career to date.

== Critical reception ==
Rolling Stone stating that the film was "lambasted by most reviewers". It has a score of 41% on Rotten Tomatoes, based on 22 reviews, with an average rating of 4.7 out of 10.

Chicago film critics Gene Siskel and Roger Ebert both praised Strait's performance, feeling that he was a convincing actor in the lead and they both enjoyed Glasser's performance, but felt the film was undermined by a hokey story, and no moments for satire which would have made the film better. In Movie and Video Guide, a review summarized that the film was "mostly pure tedium, though the film picks up some in hour two with the appearance of Glasser, and Rory Calhoun as her father".

== Soundtrack ==
Strait recorded the album's soundtrack, which was certified six times platinum by the Recording Industry Association of America. The soundtrack includes the singles "I Cross My Heart", "Heartland", and "When Did You Stop Loving Me". All three charted on Billboard Hot Country Singles & Tracks (now Hot Country Songs) in 1993, with the former two reaching number one.

== Legacy ==
=== Sequels ===
Pure Country had two sequels: Pure Country 2: The Gift (2010) and Pure Country: Pure Heart (2017). Screenwriter Rex McGee spoke of the two follow-ups saying he was not involved with those films and that their scripts existed for a long time. McGee continued that when the scripts were picked up by Warner Bros., the studio "just slapped the "Pure Country" title on."

=== Musical ===
Plans for the musical were announced in the mid to late 2000s. John Bettis and Steve Dorf were brought on to create new lyrics and music for the musical, respectively, and Rex McGee was brought on to write the book for Pure Country. A staged reading was performed on May 7, 2007, at New World Stages and featured Will Chase, Carlin Glynn, Cady Huffman, James Moye, and Danny Rutigliano in unspecified role.

The musical was originally slated to premiere on Broadway during Spring 2009 and a workshop casting call was placed in March 2008. The Broadway production was set to feature Joe Nichols and Lorrie Morgan in starring roles. This version did not come to fruition and the stage musical did not release until 2017, when it premiered on June 9 at the Irving Arts Center's Carpenter Performance Hall outside of Dallas, using the book and songs written for the Broadway release. This release coincided with a 25-year anniversary celebration for the film, in order for the celebration to serve as a lead up to the musical's premiere. Harley Jay was brought on to portray the leading role. The Dallas Morning News gave the 2017 production a favorable review.

A new production of the musical was planned by the Houston-based theater company Theatre Under The Stars for their 2019–2020 season, however this production was delayed due to the COVID-19 pandemic. If it had not been cancelled, the production would have featured Levi Kreis in the lead role, accompanied by Sally Mayes, Stephanie Gibson, and Felicia Finley.
