= Gone as a Girl Can Get =

Single by George Strait

from the album Holding My Own
- B-side: "Faults and All"
- Released: April 6, 1992
- Recorded: October 3, 1991
- Genre: Country
- Length: 3:15
- Label: MCA 12236
- Songwriter: Jerry Max Lane
- Producers: Jimmy Bowen; George Strait

George Strait singles chronology
"Lovesick Blues" (1992)	"Gone as a Girl Can Get" (1992)	"So Much Like My Dad" (1992)

"Gone as a Girl Can Get" is a song written by Jerry Max Lane and recorded by American country music artist George Strait. It was released in April 1992 as the first single from his album Holding My Own, it reached a peak of number 5 on the Billboard Hot Country Singles & Tracks (now Hot Country Songs) chart in June 1992 and peaked at number 6 on the Canadian RPM Country Tracks chart.

== Chart performance ==
"Gone as a Girl Can Get" debuted on the U.S. Billboard Hot Country Singles & Tracks for the week of April 18, 1992.

Chart (1992)	Peak position
Canada Country Singles (RPM)	5
US Hot Country Songs (Billboard)	5

=== Year-end charts ===
Chart (1992)	Position
Canada Country Tracks (RPM)	72
US Country Songs (Billboard)	52
