= Forever Young (1992 film) =

1992 film by Steve Miner

- Theatrical release poster
- Directed by: Steve Miner
- Written by: Jeffrey Abrams
- Produced by: Bruce Davey
- Starring: Mel Gibson; Elijah Wood; Isabel Glasser; George Wendt; Jamie Lee Curtis
- Cinematography: Russell Boyd
- Edited by: Jon Poll
- Music by: Jerry Goldsmith
- Production company: Icon Productions
- Distributed by: Warner Bros.
- Release date: December 11, 1992
- Running time: 102 minutes
- Country: United States
- Language: English
- Budget: $20 million
- Box office: $128 million

Forever Young is a 1992 American fantasy romantic drama film directed by Steve Miner and starring Mel Gibson, Elijah Wood, and Jamie Lee Curtis. The screenplay was written by J. J. Abrams from an original story named "The Rest of Daniel".

== Plot ==
In 1939, Captain Daniel McCormick is a United States Army Air Corps (USAAC) test pilot. After a successful run and subsequent crash landing in a prototype North American B-25 Mitchell bomber at Alexander Field in Northern California, McCormick is greeted by his longtime friend, scientist Harry Finley, who confides that his latest experiment, "Project B", has succeeded in building a prototype chamber for cryonic freezing. The following day, just as McCormick is about to propose to his girlfriend, Helen, she goes into a coma following an automobile accident, with doctors doubting she will ever recover. Overcome with heartbreak, McCormick insists he be put into suspended animation for one year, so he will not have to watch Helen die.

Fifty-three years later in 1992, ten-year-old airplane-enthusiast Nat Cooper and his friend Felix are playing inside the military storage warehouse housing the chamber, accidentally activating it and waking McCormick, leaving Nat's coat behind. McCormick awakens and escapes before realizing what year it is. He first approaches the military about his experiences, but they dismiss him as crazed; McCormick becomes more determined to learn what happened to him.

McCormick follows the address on the jacket back to Nat, befriending him. While hiding in Nat's treehouse, he rescues Nat's mother Claire from her abusive ex-boyfriend Fred, slightly injuring his hand in the process. Claire fixes up his wound and a bond develops between the two; she allows McCormick to stay, and he and Nat later build a simulated bomber-plane cockpit in Nat's treehouse so that McCormick can teach Nat how to fly. McCormick passes out and is hospitalized, where he discovers his body is failing as his age begins to catch up to him.

McCormick tracks down Finley's daughter Susan, who informs him her father died in a lab fire before she was born. The FBI discovers there was a warehouse lab fire in the early 40s, and all the scientists including Finley died trying to save the frozen McCormick from the chaos. In the aftermath of the fire, people mistook the cryonics chamber for a water heater, not knowing that McCormick was inside, resulting in him being accidentally frozen for 53 years. She gives McCormick her father's journals, detailing the cryogenic process, and Finley's notes disclose that the rapid aging is irreversible. Susan also reveals that Helen is alive. Susan and McCormick then escape the FBI, who is now after them.

Claire drives McCormick to an air show where he commandeers a B-25 bomber to fly to Helen's seaside-lighthouse home, with Nat stowing away on board. Claire gives Harry's journals to the FBI, for their plans to replicate and modernize the experiment. McCormick suffers another aging attack, forcing Nat (who is now slightly familiar with the plane's controls after his simulated-training session with McCormick) to land the plane in the field near Helen's house. The now elderly McCormick reunites with the also elderly Helen and asks her to marry him; she happily accepts. McCormick introduces Nat to Helen, and the film ends with the three joining hands and going for a seaside stroll together.

== Cast ==
- Mel Gibson as Captain Daniel McCormick, USAAC
- Jamie Lee Curtis as Claire Cooper
- Elijah Wood as Nat Cooper
- Isabel Glasser as Helen
- George Wendt as Harry Finley
- Joe Morton as Cameron
- Nicolas Surovy as John
- David Marshall Grant as Lt. Col. Wilcox, USAF
- Robert Hy Gorman as Felix
- Millie Slavin as Susan Finley
- Michael Goorjian as Steven
- Veronica Lauren as Alice
- Art LaFleur as Alice's Father
- Eric Pierpoint as Fred
- Richard Ryder as Pilot at Airshow
- Walton Goggins as Gate MP

Gibson described the script as having "a real innocence and charm" and had praised Abrams' previous script, which was made into the film Regarding Henry. Gibson originally wanted the lead role, which eventually went to Harrison Ford, and insisted on seeing Abrams' next film script.

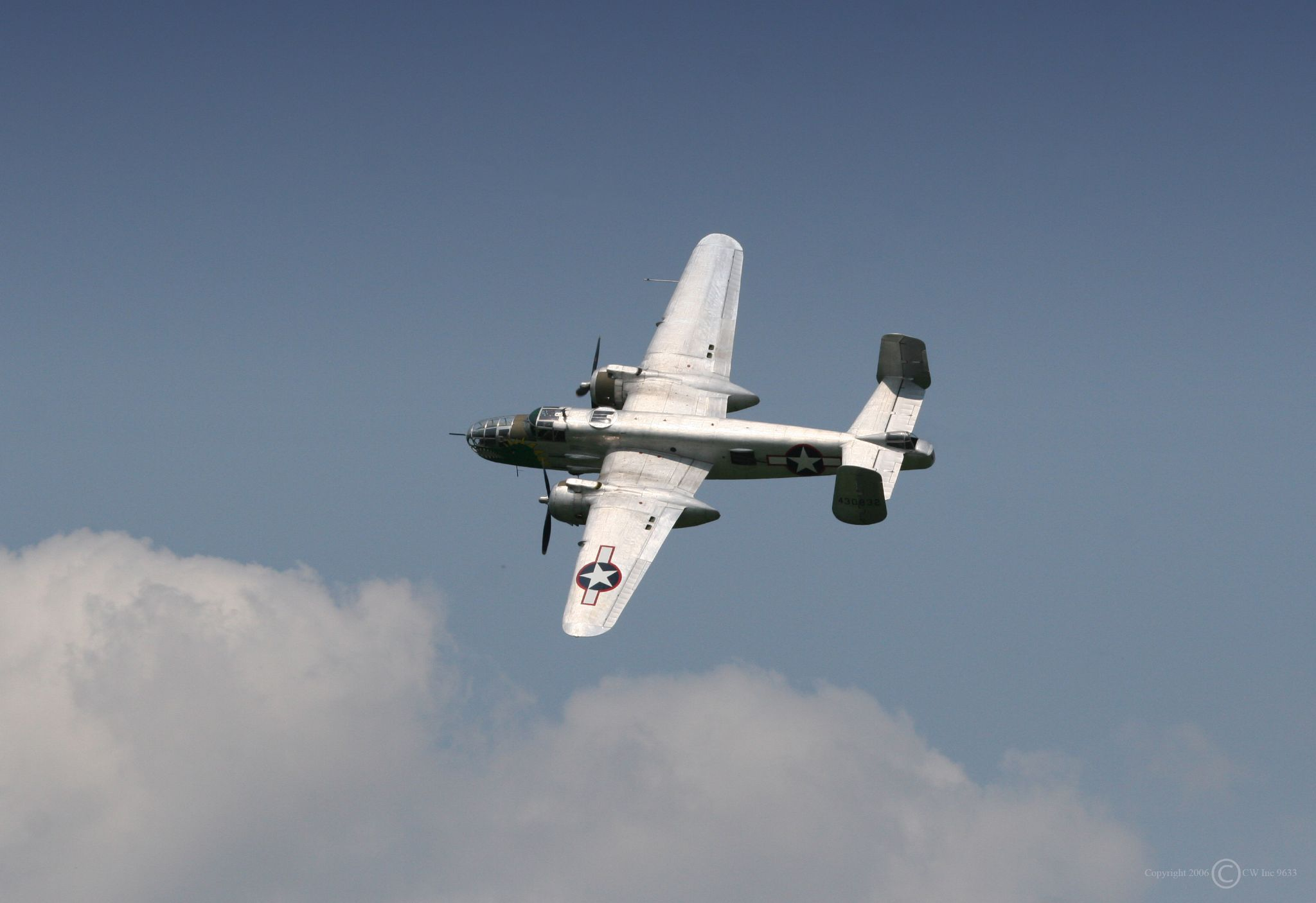
B-25 Mitchell

== Production ==
=== Development ===
In November 1990, Warner Bros. Pictures purchased the film rights to "The Rest of Daniel" for $2 million, the most ever paid for a screenplay. Originally intended as a star vehicle for Gibson, he declined the opportunity to direct the feature. The film formed part of a multi-million-dollar three-year distribution deal he signed with Warner Bros., which also guaranteed him a minimum of three months off a year to spend with his family.

=== Filming ===
Initial film shooting started in February 1992 through to April 1992. Film producers were reluctant to release too much information about the film to the media, particularly the ending, while photograph releases to print media were limited. Various locations were used including Mendocino County where shooting took place from March 29 to April 2. A purpose-built set was built at the Stornetta Ranch, near the lighthouse in Point Arena. Although the film made use of real rain for some exterior scenes, artificial rainmakers were also used to maintain a consistency in downpours for the cameras.

Curtis had never met Gibson prior to working with him on the film. During an interview, she notes the cast members would frequently play pranks on each other but that "it was a fun set, this was the fun place to be." It was the first film where Curtis had played a mother. Gibson had to spend 2 hours each day to have the latex aging make-up applied to make him appear as an 80-year-old. During filming, he slipped and dislocated his shoulder, but did not immediately realize the severity of the injury. After becoming dizzy and struggling to remember his lines, a chiropractor reset his shoulder. Gibson later remarked that forgetting his lines troubled him more than the pain.

In the scene where Wood sings "You Are My Sunshine" to the girl in the tree house, it was originally going to be a different song which according to director Steve Miner, would have been very expensive to use, whereas the song used in the film was already freely available in the public domain. The film was completed for around $20 million.

A North American B-25J Mitchell known as "Photo Fanny" (from the Planes of Fame Museum in Chino, California) is featured prominently in the film, both as the B-25 prototype and later as the restored warbird McCormick flies to his beloved

== Reception ==
Critically, Forever Young met with mixed reviews. The review aggregator website Rotten Tomatoes reported that 54% of critics have given the film a positive review based on 24 reviews, with an average rating of 5.4/10. Audiences surveyed by CinemaScore gave the film a grade of "A−" on scale of A+ to F.

Roger Ebert noted, "Forever Young is not one of the most inspired, even though it has its heart in the right place."

Gene Siskel gave the film a one-star rating, describing it as "calculated, manufactured and phony", while also criticising the casting and the lack of established relationship between Gibson and Glasser.

Box Office characterized it as "gooey sentiment and melodrama", playing on Gibson's name.

Rita Kempley from the Washington Post dismissed the film as "A pablum of schmaltz and science fiction ..."

Neill Caldwell from The Dispatch described the movie as "an old-school romantic comedy" that was "oh-so-predictable at times", while praising Wood and Robert Hy Gorman, who played Felix, as delivering the best performances, suggesting that "the kids practically carry the movie."

Laura Ustaszewski, writing for The Marion Star, praised the movie's acting and its strong supporting cast, noting that the film did not require special effects or explosions to be a "winner".

=== Box office ===
Despite the lukewarm reviews, mostly focused on the script, the film did well with audiences, and took in $127,956,187 worldwide. Forever Young opened to a first weekend gross of $5,609,875 and went on to gross $55,956,187 in the domestic market. It grossed approximately $72,000,000 in the foreign market. A Hollywood premiere was turned into a fund-raiser for two of Gibson's charities, the West Hollywood Alcohol and Drug Recovery Center and the Santa Monica Homeless Drop-in Center. A total of $70,000 was raised for both charities.

== See also ==
- Cryostasis
- Idiocracy
- Late for Dinner
- The Philadelphia Experiment

== Bibliography ==
- Clarkson, Wensley. Mel Gibson: Man on a Mission. London: John Blake, 2004. ISBN 1857825373.
- McCarty, John. The Films of Mel Gibson. New York: Citadel, 2001. ISBN 0806522267.
