= Second Chances (film) =

- Directed by: James Fargo
- Starring: Tom Amandes; Kelsey Mulrooney; Isabel Glasser; Charles Shaughnessy; Madeline Zima
- Cinematography: Stefan von Bjorn
- Edited by: Jerry U. Frizell
- Music by: Geoff Levin
- Release date: September 1, 1998
- Running time: 107 min.
- Country: United States
- Language: English

Second Chances is a 1998 film directed by James Fargo. It stars Tom Amandes, former A Little Princess star Kelsey Mulrooney, Isabel Glasser, and The Nanny's Charles Shaughnessy and Madeline Zima. Second Chances is based on a true story.

== Plot ==
After a car accident kills her father and damages her leg, a 10-year-old girl named Sunny Matthews moves with her overprotective mother Kathleen Matthews to a trailer park. Next door is a horse ranch run by former rodeo star Ben Taylor. While adjusting to her new life, Sunny develops a fondness for Ben and Ginger, a beautiful barrel racing American Quarter Horse. Kathleen does not approve of Ben and Ginger, but she eventually trusts them. Sunny finds happiness in Ginger and gets motivation to heal their injuries to be able to race.

== Cast ==
- Kelsey Mulrooney as Sunny Matthews
- Tom Amandes as Benjamin "Ben" Taylor
- Isabel Glasser as Kathleen Matthews
- Terry Moore as Dallas Taylor Judd
- Stuart Whitman as William "Buddy"
- Charles Shaughnessy as Dr. Hugh Olson
- Madeline Zima as Melinda Judd
- Theodore Bikel as Dutch John Hathaway
- Charles Napier as Craig Hardy
- Allan Miller as Dr. Rasmussen

== See also ==
- List of films about horses
- List of films about horse racing
