= Katrina Elam =

American country music singer-songwriter (born 1983)

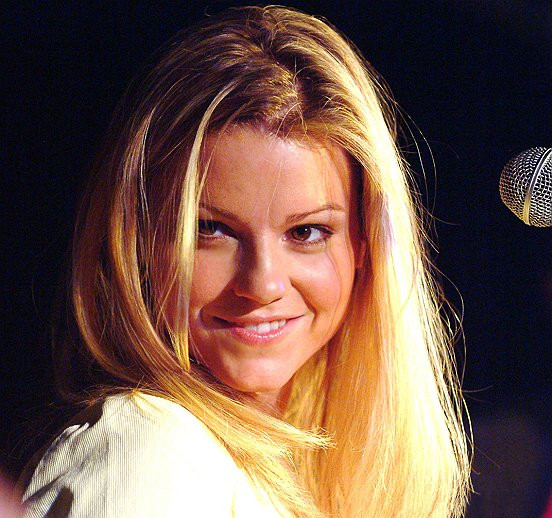
- Katrina Elam at the Maverick Saloon & Grill, Santa Ynez, California, January 14, 2005

Background information
- Born: Katrina Ruth Elam; December 12, 1983 (age 42); Bray, Oklahoma, U.S.
- Genre: Country
- Occupation: Singer-songwriter
- Instrument: Vocals
- Years active: 2004–present
- Label: Universal South

Katrina Ruth Elam (born December 12, 1983) is an American country music singer and songwriter. Signed to Universal South Records in 2004, she released her self-titled debut album that year, charting in the Billboard Hot Country Singles & Tracks (now Hot Country Songs) with the No. 29 "No End in Sight" and the No. 59 "I Want a Cowboy". A third single, "Love Is", peaked at No. 47 from an unreleased second album Turn Me Up. Elam left the label in 2008.

== Early life ==
Elam was born in Bray, Oklahoma. She performed in a 4-H talent show at the age of 9. In 1998, she was named female vocalist of the year by the Oklahoma Country Music Association and the Oklahoma Opry now the Rodeo Opry. Elam received a publishing contract at the age of 16. In her senior year of high school, her mother home schooled her because of her busy writing and recording schedule.

== Career ==
After completing high school, Katrina Elam moved to Nashville, Tennessee, where she secured a contract with Universal South Records. Jimmie Lee Sloas produced her first self-titled album, released on October 5, 2004. The album reached No. 42 on Billboard's Top Country Albums chart and No. 33 on Top Heatseekers chart. The first single, "No End in Sight", reached No. 29 on the Billboard Hot Country Songs chart. The follow-up single "I Want a Cowboy" reached No. 59 on the same chart. Elam also toured in 2004 with Keith Urban.

Elam later toured with Rascal Flatts to promote her unreleased second album, Turn Me Up. "Love Is," the first single released from the album, peaked at No. 47 on Billboard's Hot Country Songs chart in 2006. Another single from the album, "Flat on the Floor," eventually peaked at No. 52. Later in the year, Carrie Underwood includes a version of the track on her 2007 album Carnival Ride. Elam exited Universal South in 2008. Elam also co-wrote the track "Change" on Underwood's 2009 album Play On. Reba McEntire covered "I Want a Cowboy" on her 2009 album Keep on Loving You. Elam also co-wrote Rascal Flatts' 2011 single "Easy", which features Natasha Bedingfield, and Eli Young Band's 2012 single "Say Goodnight", co-written by John Paul White of The Civil Wars. In 2014, Hunter Hayes co-wrote his single "Invisible" with Elam.

In late 2010, Elam was cast in a sequel to the 1992 film Pure Country, titled Pure Country 2: The Gift Elam's "Dream Big" was released to radio in late 2010 and served as the lead single for the movie's soundtrack, which was released on February 8, 2011.

== Discography ==
=== Studio albums ===
| Title | Details | Peak chart positions | |
| Title | Details | US Country | US Heat |
|---|---|---|---|
| Katrina Elam | Release date: October 5, 2004; Label: Universal South Records | 42 | 33 |
| Pure Country 2: The Gift | Release date: February 8, 2011; Label: WaterTower Music | 55 | 44 |

=== Singles ===
| Year | Single | Peak positions | Album |
| Year | Single | US Country | Album |
|---|---|---|---|
| 2004 | "No End in Sight" | 29 | Katrina Elam |
| 2005 | "I Want a Cowboy" | 59 | Katrina Elam |
| 2006 | "Love Is" | 47 | Turn Me Up (unreleased) |
| 2007 | "Flat on the Floor" | 52 | Turn Me Up (unreleased) |
| 2010 | "Dream Big" | — | Pure Country 2: The Gift (soundtrack) |
"—" denotes releases that did not chart

=== Music videos ===
| Year | Video | Director |
|---|---|---|
| 2004 | "No End in Sight" | Peter Zavadil |
| 2006 | "Love Is" | Trey Fanjoy |
