= So Much Like My Dad =

Single by George Strait

from the album Holding My Own
- B-side: "Wonderland of Love"
- Released: June 29, 1992
- Recorded: October 3, 1991
- Genre: Country
- Length: 3:26
- Label: MCA 54439
- Songwriters: Chips Moman; Bobby Emmons
- Producers: Jimmy Bowen; George Strait

George Strait singles chronology
| "Gone as a Girl Can Get" (1992) | "So Much Like My Dad" (1992) | "I Cross My Heart" (1992) |

"So Much Like My Dad" is a song written by Chips Moman and Bobby Emmons and recorded by Willie Nelson on his 1986 album Partners. American country music artist George Strait released the song in June 1992 as the second single from his album Holding My Own. The song reached number 3 on the Billboard Hot Country Singles & Tracks chart in October 1992.

== Content ==
This slow to mid-tempo song takes a look at the relationship between a father and a son. The narrator actually plays the part of the son begging his mom for assistance. He wants to know what his dad always said to make his mom stay because his lover is going to leave him.

== Critical reception ==
Deborah Evans Price, of Billboard magazine reviewed the song favorably, calling it an "elaborate and emotional production during which Strait's vocal is remarkably effective."

== Chart performance ==
"So Much Like My Dad" debuted at number 60 on the U.S. Billboard Hot Country Singles & Tracks for the week of July 11, 1992.

| Chart (1992) | Peak position |
|---|---|
| Canada Country Singles (RPM) | 3 |
| US Hot Country Songs (Billboard) | 3 |

=== Year-end charts ===
| Chart (1992) | Position |
|---|---|
| Canada Country Tracks (RPM) | 46 |
| US Country Songs (Billboard) | 50 |
