= I Cross My Heart =

1992 single by George Strait

Single by George Strait

from the album Pure Country
- B-side: "You're Right, I'm Wrong"
- Released: September 28, 1992
- Recorded: April 16, 1992
- Genre: Country
- Length: 3:30
- Label: MCA Nashville 54478
- Songwriters: Steve Dorff, Eric Kaz
- Producers: Tony Brown; George Strait

George Strait singles chronology
"So Much Like My Dad" (1992)	"I Cross My Heart" (1992)	"Heartland" (1993)

"I Cross My Heart" is a song written by Steve Dorff and Eric Kaz, and recorded by American country music artist George Strait. It was released in September 1992 as the first single to his album Pure Country, which is also the soundtrack to the movie of the same title. It reached number-one in both the United States and Canada. The song is featured as the movie's finale.

== Background ==
"I Cross My Heart" was written by Steve Dorff and Eric Kaz in 1982. Dorff had recorded a demo-tape in a rhythm and blues-styling similar to vocal group Boyz II Men. Bette Midler originally recorded a piano-ballad version on the song in 1984 for inclusion in one of her films, but the song was removed from final production. George Strait recorded the song for the film Pure Country after hearing the song in a performance by Dorff, who pitched the song for the film's ending ballad.

== Music video ==
The music video was directed by Charley Randazzo and consists entirely of scenes from the film. Strait's next music video "Heartland" also exclusively used scenes from Pure Country. These two videos were released consecutively, as were the singles.

== Critical reception ==
"I Cross My Heart" is widely regarded as one of Strait's best songs. Billboard and American Songwriter ranked the song number five and number four, respectively, on their lists of the 10 greatest George Strait songs.

== Chart positions ==
"I Cross My Heart" debuted at number 58 on the U.S. Billboard Hot Country Singles & Tracks for the week of October 3, 1992 and peaked at number one on December 5, 1992. Since it became available for digital download, the song has sold 992,000 digital copies in the United States as of January 2015.

Chart (1992)	Peak position
Canada Country Singles (RPM)	1
US Hot Country Songs (Billboard)	1

=== Year-end charts ===
Chart (1993)	Position
Canada Country Tracks (RPM)	81

== Certifications ==
Region	Certification	Certified units/sales
United States (RIAA)	3× Platinum	3,000,000^{‡}
^{‡} Sales+streaming figures based on certification alone.
