= Daddy's Dyin': Who's Got the Will? =

1990 film by Jack Fisk

Daddy's Dyin' ...Who's Got the Will?
- Theatrical release poster
- Directed by: Jack Fisk
- Written by: Del Shores
- Based on: Daddy's Dyin': Who's Got the Will? by Del Shores
- Produced by: Steve Golin; Monty Montgomery
- Starring: Beau Bridges; Beverly D'Angelo; Tess Harper; Judge Reinhold; Amy Wright; Patrika Darbo; Molly McClure; Keith Carradine
- Cinematography: Paul Elliott
- Edited by: Edward A. Warschilka
- Music by: David McHugh
- Production companies: Metro-Goldwyn-Mayer; Propaganda Films
- Distributed by: MGM/UA Pictures Inc.
- Release date: May 4, 1990
- Running time: 95 minutes
- Country: United States
- Language: English
- Budget: $4 million
- Box office: $1,373,728

Daddy's Dyin' ...Who's Got the Will? is a 1990 American ensemble comedy-drama film. Del Shores wrote the screenplay, based on his 1987 play of the same title.

== Plot ==
Buford Turnover (Bert Remsen) is suffering from advanced dementia, and it's only a matter of time before he dies. Told by Buford's mother-in-law Lois (Molly McClure) ('Mama Wheelis' to her grandchildren) that their father is dying, his four adult children arrive at the family's homestead to spend time with their father during his last days. It's a mixed bag of personalities: Lurlene (Amy Wright), the eldest sister, a minister's wife who rarely visits the rest of the family; Sara Lee (Tess Harper), the spinsterish middle sister who cares for her father with the help of her grandmother; Orville (Beau Bridges), the greedy, abusive brother, and his wife, Marlene (Patrika Darbo); and the youngest sibling Evalita (Beverly D'Angelo), the six-times married aspiring country singer, who brings her hippie boyfriend Harmony (Judge Reinhold).

All arrive at the Turnover homestead, and personalities clash.

Eldest sister Lurlene irritates her siblings as she tries to take control of the situation, causing resentment by acting too much like their deceased mother Linnie Sue (Carolyn Brooks). She is a bit estranged from the rest of the family, having only returned to the homestead every few years since she married and moved away, leaving her father to try to run the farm alone. For this reason, Lurlene suspects that she has been cut out of the will. However, Lurlene has few altercations with her siblings and tries to keep the peace among them.

Sara Lee also tries to act as peacemaker, until Evalita has a drunken night at the bar with Clarence (Keith Carradine), to whom Sara Lee is engaged (though it is later revealed to the audience that the two had broken up at some prior point). Evalita implies that she and Clarence had slept together, though Clarence denies the event.

Orville frequently verbally abuses Marlene, often criticizing her weight and parenting skills. (The couple have one son, Jimbo, whom Orville sent to reform school after catching him smoking marijuana and huffing gasoline.) Orville is rarely seen without a beer in his hand. Marlene is preoccupied with her weight and is quite unhappy with her husband and life. She and her sisters-in-law and grandmother-in-law get along very well, and Marlene quickly forms a close bond with Harmony as well.

Evalita is constantly drunk and makes her family uncomfortable during very public displays of affection with Harmony. She spends most of her time not at home with her dying father, but at the local bar, singing. On one occasion, she lies about her age.

Harmony is initially distrusted by the family, but eventually manages to win the family over (except Orville) when he demonstrates his piano playing ability by playing "I'll Fly Away" on the family piano. As everybody gathers together to sing along, Buford hears the music and rises from his bed, watching his grown son and daughters sing. He sees them as small children, singing with their mother.

When Harmony and Marlene secretly share a joint, he tells her that he is falling in love with her, and asks her to run away with him. She refuses, but they end up kissing in the kitchen and nearly get caught by Orville.

Eventually, Mama Wheelis remembers that Buford kept his will in a strong box buried in the yard. Harmony helps open the box by picking the lock, telling the family that he had once served time in prison for burglary. Evalita, again drunk, berates him for this and Harmony leaves. The will is read, and though all the siblings had been forgiven by their father in an earlier scene, the will hadn't been changed and Lurlene and Orville each receive only $1 of the $600,000 estate. Jimbo receives what would have been his father's share in the estate. Sara Lee offers to share her inheritance with Orville and Lurlene, but Evalita refuses to give up any of hers.

Harmony returns to tell Evalita that he has thrown her belongings out of his van, and that he is going back to California. Marlene quickly grabs her suitcase and leaves with Harmony.

Buford eventually dies, and the family converges in the living room for the funeral. They begin to practice the song they will sing at the funeral, and an image of Buford can be seen, watching. Again, he sees his adult children as young children.

In their newfound peace, the will is temporarily forgotten.

== Cast ==
- Beau Bridges as Orville Turnover
- Beverly D'Angelo as Evalita Turnover
- Tess Harper as Sara Lee Turnover
- Amy Wright as Lurlene Turnover
- Patrika Darbo as Marlene Turnover
- Judge Reinhold as Harmony
- Bert Remsen as Buford Turnover
- Molly McClure as Lois "Mama" Wheelis
- Keith Carradine as Clarence
- Carolyn Brooks as Linnie Sue Turnover
- Emily Bridges as Little Evalita Turnover
- Schuyler Fisk as Little Sara Lee Turnover
