= Katrina Elam (album) =

Studio album by Katrina Elam
- Released: October 5, 2004
- Studio: Ocean Way Nashville, Starstruck Studios and Art House (Nashville, Tennessee); Sound Kitchen and The Bennett House (Franklin, Tennessee)
- Genre: Country
- Length: 40:23
- Label: Universal South
- Producer: Tony Brown; Jimmie Lee Sloas

Katrina Elam chronology
Katrina Elam (2004)	Pure Country 2: The Gift (2011)

Professional ratings
Review scores
Source	Rating
Allmusic	3/5 stars
About.com	4.5/5 stars

Katrina Elam is the debut studio album by American country music artist Katrina Elam. It was released in 2004 (see 2004 in country music) on the Universal South Records label. The album peaked at No. 42 on the Billboard Top Country Albums chart and No. 33 on the Top Heatseekers chart. It also produced two singles in "No End in Sight" and "I Want a Cowboy", which respectively reached No. 29 and No. 59 on the Hot Country Singles & Tracks chart.

After the release of Katrina Elam, Elam recorded a second album for Universal South in 2007, entitled Turn Me Up. Although two of this album's tracks charted, the album itself was not released, and Elam exited Universal South's roster.

== Track listing ==
No.	Title	Writer(s)	Length
1.	"Strong Anything"	Jill Webb Hill, Chuck Jones, Marcus Hummon	4:23
2.	"No End in Sight"	Robin Lee Bruce, Katrina Elam, Christi Dannemiller	4:38
3.	"The Breakup Song"	Elam, Lee Thomas Miller	3:19
4.	"I Want a Cowboy"	Elam, Jimmie Lee Sloas, Wayne Kirkpatrick, David Davidson	3:50
5.	"Unbreakable"	Elam, Vicky McGehee, John Rich	3:13
6.	"Flowers by the Side of the Road"	Dave Berg, Deanna Bryant	3:36
7.	"Drop Dead Gorgeous"	Elam, Kirkpatrick, Josh Leo	3:00
8.	"Normal"	Elam, Miller, Chris DuBois	2:54
9.	"I Won't Say Goodbye"	Elam, Miller	3:51
10.	"Home Running Away"	Elam, Stephony Smith, Jim Collins	4:25
11.	"Prelude to the Kiss"	Elam, Gordon Kennedy, Sloas, Davidson	3:14
Total length:			40:23

== Personnel ==
- Katrina Elam – vocals, backing vocals (4, 11)
- Tim Akers – Hammond B3 organ (1, 7, 8, 10), acoustic piano (6, 8), accordion (6), synth clavinet (7)
- Steve Nathan – acoustic piano (3), Hammond B3 organ (3, 5, 9)
- J. T. Corenflos – electric guitar
- Bryan Sutton – acoustic guitar (1–3, 5–11), banjo (1, 4), octave mandolin (7)
- Steuart Smith – electric guitar (2, 3, 5, 9)
- Keith Urban – electric guitar (2), ganjo (2)
- Gordon Kennedy – electric guitar (11), backing vocals (11)
- Paul Franklin – steel guitar (1–3, 5–10)
- Jerry Douglas – dobro (1, 7)
- Rob Ickes – dobro (10)
- Aubrey Haynie – mandolin (1, 2, 5, 8), fiddle (3, 6–9)
- Jimmie Lee Sloas – bass, acoustic guitar (4, 11), National guitar (4)
- Chris McHugh – drums (1, 4, 8, 11)
- Shannon Forrest – drums (2, 3, 5–7, 9, 10)
- Eric Darken – percussion
- Stuart Duncan – fiddle (1, 10)
- Jimmy Mattingly – fiddle (4, 11)
- David Angell – strings (4, 11)
- Monisa Angell – strings (4, 11)
- David Davidson – strings (4, 11), string arrangements and composing (4, 11)
- Anthony LaMarchina – strings (4)
- Jonathan Yudkin – strings (6, 9), string arrangements and composing (6, 9)
- Lisa Cochran – backing vocals (1, 9, 10)
- Wes Hightower – backing vocals (1, 2, 8, 9, 10)
- Robin Lee Bruce – backing vocals (2, 3, 8)
- Jim Collins – backing vocals (3)
- Wayne Kirkpatrick – backing vocals (4)
- Chip Davis – backing vocals (5)
- Dan Tyminski – backing vocals (6)

=== Production ===
- Tony Brown – producer (1–3, 5–10)
- Jimmie Lee Sloas – producer
- Julian King – recording (1–3, 5–10)
- Richie Biggs – additional recording (1–3, 5–10), recording (4, 11)
- JR Rodriguez – additional recording assistant (1–3, 5–10)
- David Bryant – recording assistant (1–3, 5–10)
- Shawn McLean – recording assistant (4, 11)
- Justin Niebank – mixing at Paragon Studios (Nashville, Tennessee)
- Drew Bollman – mix assistant
- Don Cobb – mastering
- Eric Conn – mastering
- Independent Mastering (Nashville, Tennessee) – mastering location
- Amy Russell – production coordinator
- Karen Cronin – art direction, design
- Susan Levy – art direction
- Dana Tynan – photography
- Paula Jehle Turner – hair, make-up
- Claudia Fowler – wardrobe stylist
- Borman Entertainment – management

== Chart performance ==
=== Album ===
Chart (2004)	Peak position
US Top Country Albums (Billboard)	42
US Heatseekers Albums (Billboard)	33

=== Singles ===
Date	Title	Chart	Position
2004	"No End in Sight"	US Hot Country Songs (Billboard)	29
2005	"I Want a Cowboy"	US Hot Country Songs (Billboard)	59
