= Tom Amandes =

American actor (born 1959)

- Born: March 9, 1959 (age 67); Richmond, Illinois, U.S.
- Education: DePaul University
- Occupations: Actor; director
- Years active: 1987–present
- Spouse: Nancy Everhard (m. 1996)
- Children: 3

Thomas Amandes (born March 9, 1959) is an American actor. He is known for his role as Eliot Ness in the 1990s television series The Untouchables; he also played Geena Davis' boyfriend in The Long Kiss Goodnight, and Abraham Lincoln in the 2013 film Saving Lincoln.

In 2002-2006 he had a main role as Dr. Harold Abbott on The WB series Everwood.

== Early life and education ==
Amandes was born the sixth of 11 children in Richmond, Illinois. Amandes began acting at an early age, performing at home with his siblings and starring in school productions. He graduated in 1977 from Crystal Lake Central High School. In 1981, after graduating from the Goodman School of Drama at DePaul University, Amandes set out to apprentice on the Chicago stage.

== Career ==
A turning point in Amandes' career was being cast as Eliot Ness in the television series The Untouchables. He went on to star in The Pursuit of Happiness with Brad Garrett and Larry Miller.

Amandes co-starred in the TV drama Everwood from 2002 to 2006 alongside Treat Williams, Emily VanCamp and Chris Pratt.

Other television credits include recurring roles on The Guardian, JAG, Spin City, Sisters and From the Earth to the Moon, in which Amandes portrayed Astronaut Harrison 'Jack' Schmitt. Amandes has guest-starred on The Practice, The King of Queens, Just Shoot Me!, ER, Seven Days, The Larry Sanders Show, Greek, Chicago Fire, The Good Guys, NUMB3RS, Perry Mason, and Private Practice.

Amandes wrapped production on the comedy Dirty Deeds. He has appeared in the films Brokedown Palace, Second Chances, Straight Talk, and Billboard Dad. Amandes appeared in the HBO film Live from Baghdad.

In 2012 until 2014 he had a recurring role as a governor in Scandal, a role he played again in 2018.

In 2015 Amandes acted alongside VanCamp in Revenge.

In 2016 Amandes appeared in the fourth season of Arrow as cyber-criminal Noah Kuttler/the Calculator.

In 2021 he appeared in The Terminal List as Vic Campbell.

== Personal life ==
Amandes married actress Nancy Everhard in 1996; they met during the filming of the television series The Untouchables in 1993. They have three children together.

== Filmography ==
=== Film ===
Year	Title	Role	Notes
1996	The Long Kiss Goodnight	Hal	
1998	Second Chances	Ben Taylor	
1998	Billboard Dad	Maxwell Tyler	Video
1999	Brokedown Palace	Doug Davis	
2005	Dirty Deeds	Lester Fuchs	
2006	Bonneville	Bill Packard	
2011	Lucky	Jonathan	
2013	Saving Lincoln	Abraham Lincoln	
2013	Imagine	Dr. Arlen	Short
2017	The Bachelors	David Wilkes	
2018	A Million Little Pieces	Dr. Baker	

=== Television ===
Year	Title	Role	Notes
1992	Overexposed	Asst. D.A. Mallery	TV film
1993–94	The Untouchables	Eliot Ness	Main role
1994	Murphy Brown	David Wofford	Episode: "Where Have You Gone, Joe DiMaggio?"
1994	Because Mommy Works	Eric Donovan	TV film
1995	Sisters	Martin	Episodes: "Sleeping with the Devil", "Word of Honor"
1995	If Someone Had Known	Paul Chambers	TV film
1995	The Pursuit of Happiness	Steve Rutledge	Main role
1996–97	Promised Land	Fred Mooster	Episodes: "The Hostage", "Mooster's Revenge"
1998	The Larry Sanders Show	Russ Schmitt	Episode: "Beverly's Secret"
1998	From the Earth to the Moon	Jack Schmitt	TV miniseries
1998	Seven Days	Gen. Wayne Starker	Episodes: "Doppleganger: Parts 1 & 2"
1998	ER	David Gardner	Episode: "The Miracle Worker"
1999	Just Shoot Me!	Matt Bentley	Episode: "Lies & Dolls"
1999	Down Will Come Baby	Marcus Garr	TV film
1999	If You Believe	Tom Weller	TV film
1999–2002	JAG	Cmdr. John Flagler	Episodes: "Silent Service", "The Iron Coffin", "Enemy Below"
2000	The King of Queens	Les Fisker	Episode: "Roast Chicken"
2000	Family Law	Lawrence Cameron	Episode: "One Mistake"
2000	The Practice	Robert Wakefield	Episode: "Appeal and Denial"
2001	NYPD Blue	David Jessup	Episode: "Writing Wrongs"
2001	When Good Ghouls Go Bad	James Walker	TV film
2001	Spin City	Julian Wheeler	Episodes: "A Tree Falls in Manhattan", "Yet Another Stakeout", "Fight Flub"
2001–2002	The Guardian	Dr. Thomas Reed	Episodes: "Pilot", "Reunion", "Home", "The Beginning"
2002	Live from Baghdad	Joe Erlichman	TV film
2002–2006	Everwood	Dr. Harold Abbott	Main role
2006	Numb3rs	Lawrence Dryden	Episode: "Brutus"
2007	Curb Your Enthusiasm	Bert	Episode: "The Lefty Call"
2007	Women's Murder Club	D.A. Pratt	Episode: "The Past Comes Back to Haunt You"
2008	Private Practice	Charlie Jensen	Episode: "Equal & Justice"
2008	Boston Legal	A.A.G. Jeremy Hollis	Episodes: "The Mighty Rogues", "Juiced"
2008–2009	Eli Stone	Martin Posner	Recurring role
2009	Greek	Jack Reed	Episode: "Our Fathers"
2009	Grey's Anatomy	Tom Waller	Episode: "Tainted Obligation"
2009	Eastwick	Pastor Dunn	Episodes: "Madams and Madames", "Bonfire and Betrayal"
2009	This Might Hurt	Dr. Mitch Malinow	TV film
2010	The Deep End	Don Branford	Episodes: "Pilot", "Where There's Smoke"
2010	Big Love	Roy Colburn	Episodes: "The Greater Good", "The Mighty and Strong", "Sins of the Father"
2010	The Good Guys	Dr. Kalfuss	Episode: "Pilot"
2010	No Ordinary Family	Dr. Allen	Episode: "Pilot"
2010–2014	Parenthood	Dr. Pelikan	Recurring role (seasons 1 & 5), guest (season 2)
2011	Leverage	Livingston	Episode: "The Queen's Gambit Job"
2012	Fairly Legal	Mitch Rhinehart	Episode: "Shine a Light"
2012–2014, 2018	Scandal	Samuel Reston	Recurring role (seasons 2–3), guest (season 7)
2013	Cult	Gary Fisher	Episode: "You're Next"
2013	1600 Penn	Bernard	Episode: "Dinner, Bath, Puzzle"
2013	Don't Trust the B— in Apartment 23	Mr. Harkin	Episodes: "Paris...", "Monday June..."
2013	Castle	Aaron Stokes	Episode: "Number One Fan"
2015	Mom	Richard	Episode: "Mashed Potatoes and a Little Nitrous"
2015	Revenge	Lawrence Stamberg	Episodes: "Plea", "Two Graves"
2015	Chicago Fire	Det. Ryan Wheeler	Episodes: "2112", "Sharp Elbows", "When Tortoises Fly", "Short and Fat"
2016	The Detour	Dr. Rob	Episodes: "The B&B", "The Wedding", "The Track"
2016	Better Things	Drexel	Episode: "Alarms"
2016	Timeless	Mark Felt	Episode: "The Watergate Tape"
2016–2017	Arrow	Noah Kuttler / The Calculator	Guest role (seasons 4 & 6)
2016–2018	The Magicians	Daniel Quinn	Episodes: "Homecoming", "The Cock Barrens", "The Losses of Magic"
2017	A Neighbor's Deception	Gerald Dixon	TV film
2017	Good Behavior	Asher	Episode: "Stay Beautiful"
2017	ctrl alt delete	Greg	Episode: "Philippa"
2019	Unbelievable	Bruce Bronstein	1 episode
2019	Perfect Harmony	Luke	Episode: "Merry Jaxmas"
2020	Criminal Minds	Dr. Sebastian Hurst	Episode: "Under the Skin"
2021	The Terminal List	Vic Campbell	
2023	Perry Mason	Judge Durkin	Recurring role (seasons 2)
