= Holding My Own =

Studio album by George Strait
- Released: April 21, 1992
- Recorded: September – October 1991
- Studio: Emerald Studio (Nashville, Tennessee)
- Genre: Neotraditional country
- Length: 30:14
- Label: MCA
- Producers: Jimmy Bowen; George Strait

George Strait chronology
Ten Strait Hits (1991)	Holding My Own (1992)	Pure Country (1992)

Singles from Holding My Own
- 1. "Gone as a Girl Can Get" Released: April 6, 1992; 2. "So Much Like My Dad" Released: June 29, 1992

Professional ratings
Review scores
Source	Rating
Allmusic	3/5 stars
Chicago Tribune	3/4 stars
Entertainment Weekly	A− link

Holding My Own is the twelfth studio album by American country music singer George Strait. It was released by MCA Records and features the singles "Gone as a Girl Can Get" and "So Much Like My Dad", both of which charted in the Top 5 on the country charts, but it became his first album since 1981's Strait Country not to produce a number one hit. "Trains Make Me Lonesome" was previously recorded by the trio Schuyler, Knobloch, & Overstreet on their 1986 self-titled debut album, and then in 1988 by Marty Haggard.

== Track listing ==
No.	Title	Writer(s)	Length
1.	"You're Right, I'm Wrong"	Marty Stuart, Wayne Perry	2:34
2.	"Holding My Own"	Dean Dillon, Pam Belford	3:20
3.	"Gone as a Girl Can Get"	Jerry Max Lane	3:15
4.	"So Much Like My Dad"	Chips Moman, Bobby Emmons	3:26
5.	"Trains Make Me Lonesome"	Paul Overstreet, Thom Schuyler	3:46
6.	"All of Me (Loves All of You)"	Kim Williams, L. David Lewis, Monty Holmes	2:44
7.	"Wonderland of Love"	Curtis Wayne	2:58
8.	"Faults and All"	Carl Perkins	2:41
9.	"It's Alright with Me"	Jackson Leap	2:50
10.	"Here We Go Again"	Don Lanier, Red Steagall	2:53

== Personnel ==
The following musicians performed on this album:

Ace in the Hole Band (Tracks 3 and 9)

- George Strait – vocals
- Ronnie Huckaby – acoustic piano
- David Anthony – acoustic guitars
- Benny MacArthur – electric guitars
- Rick McRae – electric guitars
- Mike Daily – steel guitar
- Terry Hale – bass
- Mike Kennedy – drums
- Gene Elders – fiddle

All other tracks

- George Strait – lead vocals
- Floyd Domino – acoustic piano
- Steve Gibson – acoustic guitars
- Reggie Young – electric guitars
- Buddy Emmons – steel guitar
- Joe Chemay – bass
- Larrie Londin – drums
- Johnny Gimble – fiddle
- Jim Horn – saxophone, alto flute
- Liana Manis – backing vocals
- Curtis Young – backing vocals

=== Production ===
- Jimmy Bowen – producer
- George Strait – producer
- Bob Bullock – recording, overdub recording
- Tim Kish – overdub recording
- Steve Tillisch – mixing
- Jeff Coppage – second engineer
- Russ Martin – second engineer
- Craig White – second engineer
- Milan Bogdan – digital editing
- Glenn Meadows – mastering
- Masterfonics (Nashville, Tennessee) – editing and mastering location
- Jessie Noble – project coordinator
- Jim Kemp – art direction
- Katherine DeVault – art direction, design
- Mike Rutherford – photography
- Erv Woolsey – management

== Chart positions ==
Chart (1992)	Peak position
US Billboard 200	33
US Top Country Albums (Billboard)	5
Canadian RPM Country Albums	17

== Certifications ==
Certifications for Holding My Own
Region	Certification	Certified units/sales
United States (RIAA)	Platinum	1,000,000^{^}
^{^} Shipments figures based on certification alone.
