= Molly McClure =

American actress

- Born: Mary Ella Karnes; January 19, 1919; Watsonville, California, U.S.
- Died: August 15, 2008 (aged 89); Plano, Texas, U.S.
- Occupation: Actress

Molly McClure (January 19, 1919 – August 15, 2008) was an American film and television actress.

She appeared in films and televisions series such as Daddy's Dyin': Who's Got the Will?, Murphy Brown, Mrs. Doubtfire, City Slickers II: The Legend of Curly's Gold, Walker, Texas Ranger and Pure Country.

== Filmography ==
Year	Title	Role	Notes
1988	Moving	Puzzle Lady	
1988	Arthur 2: On the Rocks	Greta	
1990	Daddy's Dyin': Who's Got the Will?	Mama Wheelis	
1991	City Slickers	Millie Stone	
1992	Pure Country	Grandma Ivy Chandler	
1993	Mrs. Doubtfire	Woman Housekeeper	
1994	A Gift from Heaven		
1994	City Slickers II: The Legend of Curly's Gold	Millie Stone	
1995-1997	Walker, Texas Ranger	Elderly Woman, Sally Calhoun	2 episodes
1995	Under the Hula Moon	Grandmother	
1998	Finding North	Aunt Bonnie	
1998	The Patriot	Molly	(final film role)
