= No End in Sight (song) =

Single by Katrina Elam

from the album Katrina Elam
- B-side: "Strong Anything"
- Released: July 31, 2004
- Genre: Country
- Length: 4:38
- Label: Universal South
- Songwriter(s): Katrina Elam, Robin Lee Bruce, Christi Dannemiller
- Producer(s): Jimmie Lee Sloas

Katrina Elam singles chronology
"No End in Sight" (2004)	"I Want a Cowboy" (2005)

"No End in Sight" is a debut song co-written and recorded by American country music artist Katrina Elam. It was released in July 2004 as the lead single from her self-titled album, Katrina Elam. The song peaked at #29 on the Billboard Hot Country Singles & Tracks chart. The song was written by Elam, Robin Lee Bruce, and Christi Dannemiller.

== Chart performance ==
Chart (2004)	Peak position
US Hot Country Songs (Billboard)	29
