= Pure Country (soundtrack) =

Studio album / soundtrack album by George Strait
- Released: September 15, 1992
- Recorded: April 1992
- Studio: Tracks 1–10 at Sound Stage Studios and Emerald Studios (Nashville, TN); Track 11 at Warner Bros. Recording Studios (Burbank, CA); Masterfonics and Sixteenth Avenue Sound (Nashville, TN); Ocean Way Recording and Conway Studios (Hollywood, CA)
- Genre: Neotraditional country; honky-tonk
- Length: 31:02
- Label: MCA
- Producer: Tony Brown; George Strait: "Heartland (The Title Sequence)" produced by Steve Dorff

George Strait chronology
Holding My Own (1992)	Pure Country (1992)	Easy Come Easy Go (1993)

Singles from Pure Country
- 1. "I Cross My Heart" Released: September 28, 1992; 2. "Heartland" Released: January 4, 1993; 3. "When Did You Stop Loving Me" Released: April 19, 1993

Professional ratings
Review scores
Source	Rating
Allmusic	3.5/5 stars
Entertainment Weekly	C−
Q	3/5 stars

Pure Country is the thirteenth studio album by American country music singer George Strait. Released on September 15, 1992, by MCA Records, it serves as the soundtrack album to the 1992 Warner Bros. film of the same name. The film stars Strait as a fictitious country singer Dusty Chandler, and the album consists mostly of songs sung by Dusty in the film. The Pure Country soundtrack is Strait's first soundtrack album.

Although the film was a mild success, garnering box office receipts of over $15 million against a $10 million budget, the film's soundtrack album is Strait's most commercially successful studio album, having shipped over six million copies.

== Content ==
This was the first album of Strait's career to feature Tony Brown, who produced all of Strait's subsequent albums, until Cold Beer Conversation (2015). Strait and Brown produced the entire album except for the main title sequence version of "Heartland", which was produced by Steve Dorff.

Music videos were made for "I Cross My Heart" and "Heartland". Both of these songs were Number One hits for Strait on the Billboard country charts, and "When Did You Stop Loving Me" (which was later recorded by George Jones on his 1998 album It Don't Get Any Better Than This) was a #6 hit. "Overnight Male", originally recorded by B.B. Watson on his 1991 debut album Light at the End of the Tunnel, also charted at #72 from unsolicited airplay. "Last in Love" was originally recorded by JD Souther on his 1979 album, You're Only Lonely. "The King of Broken Hearts" and "Where the Sidewalk Ends" were written or co-written and originally recorded by Jim Lauderdale on his album, Planet of Love. The former was later recorded by Mark Chesnutt on his 1995 album Wings, and by Lee Ann Womack on her 2008 album Call Me Crazy. The latter was also recorded by Jann Browne on her 1991 album, It Only Hurts When I Laugh.

== Track listing ==
No.	Title	Writer(s)	Length
1.	"Heartland"	Steve Dorff, John Bettis	2:16
2.	"Baby Your Baby"	Phil Thomas, Hal Newman	2:42
3.	"I Cross My Heart"	Dorff, Eric Kaz	3:30
4.	"When Did You Stop Loving Me"	Donny Kees, Monty Holmes	2:48
5.	"She Lays It All on the Line"	Clay Blaker	2:30
6.	"Overnight Male"	Richard Fagan, Kim Williams, Ron Harbin	2:36
7.	"Last in Love"	JD Souther, Glenn Frey	3:35
8.	"Thoughts of a Fool"	Mel Tillis, Wayne P. Walker	2:12
9.	"The King of Broken Hearts"	Jim Lauderdale	3:08
10.	"Where the Sidewalk Ends"	Lauderdale, John Leventhal	3:08
11.	"Heartland (Main Title Sequence)" (featuring Bubba Strait)	Dorff, Bettis	2:42

== Personnel ==
- George Strait – lead vocals, acoustic guitar
- John Barlow Jarvis – acoustic piano (1, 3, 4, 5, 7–10)
- Steve Nathan – acoustic piano (2, 6)
- Pat Coil – acoustic piano (11)
- Dean Parks – electric guitar (1, 9, 10), guitars (11)
- Brent Rowan – electric guitar (1, 2, 6, 9, 10)
- Randy Scruggs – acoustic guitar (1, 3, 4, 5, 7–10)
- Pat Flynn – acoustic guitar (2, 6)
- Steve Gibson – electric guitar (3, 7)
- Brent Mason – electric guitar (4, 5, 8)
- George Doering – guitars (11)
- Buddy Emmons – steel guitar (1, 3, 4, 5, 7–10)
- Sonny Garrish – steel guitar (2, 6)
- Doug Livingston – steel guitar (11)
- David Hungate – bass (1, 3, 7, 9, 10)
- Emory Gordy Jr. – bass (2, 6)
- Glenn Worf – bass (4, 5, 8)
- Neil Stubenhaus – bass (11)
- Eddie Bayers – drums (1, 9, 10)
- Owen Hale – drums (2–8)
- John Robinson – drums (11)
- Stuart Duncan – fiddle (1, 3, 7, 9, 10)
- Glen Duncan – fiddle (2, 4, 5, 6, 8)
- Richard Greene – fiddle (11)
- Steve Dorff – string arrangements and conductor, arrangements (11)
- Patti Zimmitti – string contractor
- Liana Manis – backing vocals
- Harry Stinson – backing vocals
- Curtis Young – backing vocals
- Andrea Zonn – backing vocals
- Bubba Strait – lead and harmony vocals (11)

=== Production ===
- Tony Brown – producer (1–10)
- George Strait – producer (1–10)
- Steve Dorff – producer (11)
- Chuck Ainlay – recording, mixing
- Steve Tillisch – recording, overdub recording
- Russ Martin – overdub recording, second engineer
- Doug Rider – overdub recording
- Darren Smith – overdub recording
- Bart Stevens – second engineer
- Marty Williams – second engineer
- John Guess – mixing
- Milan Bogdan – digital editing
- Glenn Meadows – mastering
- Jessie Noble – project coordinator
- Virginia Team – art direction
- Chris Ferrara – design
- Ron Phillips – photography
- Erv Woolsey – management

== Chart positions ==
=== Weekly charts ===
Chart (1992–1993)	Peak position
Canadian Albums (RPM)	32
Canadian Country Albums (RPM)	1
US Billboard 200	6
US Top Country Albums (Billboard)	1

=== Year-end charts ===
Chart (1992)	Position
US Top Country Albums (Billboard)	25
Chart (1993)	Position
US Billboard 200	13
US Top Country Albums (Billboard)	3
Chart (1994)	Position
US Billboard 200	97
US Top Country Albums (Billboard)	17
Chart (1995)	Position
US Top Country Albums (Billboard)	37

=== Singles ===
Year	Single	Peak positions	
Year	Single	US Country	CAN Country
1992	"I Cross My Heart"	1	1
1993	"Heartland"	1	1
1993	"When Did You Stop Loving Me"	6	6

== Certifications ==
Region	Certification	Certified units/sales
Canada (Music Canada)	Platinum	100,000^{^}
United States (RIAA)	6× Platinum	6,000,000^{^}
^{^} Shipments figures based on certification alone.
