= Christopher Cain =

American film director (born 1943)

- Born: October 29, 1943 (age 82); Sioux Falls, South Dakota, U.S.
- Occupations: Director, screenwriter, and producer
- Spouse: Sharon Thomas (m. 1969)
- Children: 3, including Dean Cain

Christopher Cain (born October 29, 1943) is an American director, screenwriter, and producer.

Cain was born in Sioux Falls, South Dakota. In 1969, he married Sharon Thomas, and adopted her two sons, Roger and Dean. The couple's daughter Krisinda was born in 1973.

== Filmography ==
Film

Year	Title	Director	Writer	Producer
1976	Grand Jury	Yes	Yes	Yes
1976	Elmer	Yes	Yes	No
1977	Sixth and Main	Yes	Yes	Yes
1979	Charlie and the Talking Buzzard	Yes	Yes	No
1984	The Stone Boy	Yes	No	No
1985	That Was Then... This Is Now	Yes	No	No
1986	Where the River Runs Black	Yes	No	No
1987	The Principal	Yes	No	No
1988	Young Guns	Yes	Yes	Yes
1992	Pure Country	Yes	No	No
1994	The Next Karate Kid	Yes	No	No
1995	The Amazing Panda Adventure	Yes	No	No
1997	Gone Fishin'	Yes	No	No
2001	PC and the Web	Yes	No	No
2007	September Dawn	Yes	No	Yes
2010	Pure Country 2: The Gift	Yes	Yes	Yes
2012	Deep in the Heart	Yes	No	No

TV movies

- Wheels of Terror (1990)
- Lakota Moon (1992)
- Rose Hill (1997)
- A Father's Choice (2000)
