= Hunt Lowry =

American film and TV producer

- Born: Oklahoma, U.S.
- Other names: A. Hunt Lowry
- Education: Casady School
- Occupation(s): Film and television producer
- Notable work: Donnie Darko; The Last of the Mohicans; A Time to Kill
- Relatives: Dick Lowry (brother)

Hunt Lowry (born in Oklahoma) is an American film and TV producer, who has been involved with film production since the 1980s. He is the president and CEO of Roserock Films, a Warner Bros. in-house studio. He was also key to facilitating the development of Warner Bros. World Abu Dhabi. He initially came to Los Angeles visiting a brother, but stayed and launched his production career. He is a graduate of the Casady School. He is the brother of Dick Lowry.

== Production credits ==
- Humanoids from the Deep (1980, co-producer)
- Airplane! (1980, associate)
- Rascals and Robbers: The Secret Adventures of Tom Sawyer and Huckleberry Finn (1982, executive)
- Get Crazy (1983)
- Top Secret! (1984)
- His Mistress (1984)
- Surviving (1985)
- Wild Horses (1985)
- Dream West (1986)
- Baja Oklahoma (1988, executive)
- Wildfire (1988, executive)
- Revenge (1990)
- Career Opportunities (1991)
- Only the Lonely (1991)
- The Last of the Mohicans (1992)
- Striking Distance (1993)
- My Life (1993)
- First Knight (1995)
- A Time to Kill (1996)
- Rock City Limits (1998)
- Disney's The Kid (2000)
- L.A. Models (2000)
- Donnie Darko (2001, executive)
- Hounded (2001, executive)
- A Walk to Remember (2002)
- Welcome to Collinwood (2002, executive)
- Divine Secrets of the Ya-Ya Sisterhood (2002)
- White Oleander (2002)
- Cypher (2002)
- Blue Collar Comedy Tour: The Movie (2003)
- What a Girl Wants (2003)
- Grind (2003)
- A Cinderella Story (2004)
- Duma (2005)
- Thou Shalt Laugh (2006)
- Thou Shalt Laugh the Deuce (2007)
- Shorts (2009)
- Thou Shalt Laugh 3 (2009)
- Thou Shalt Laugh 4 (2010)
- Pure Country 2: The Gift (2010)
- Flight 7500 (2014)
- Pure Country: Pure Heart (2017)
- Deep Blue Sea 3, (2020)
- Eraser: Reborn (2022)
