= Heartland (George Strait song) =

Single by George Strait

from the album Pure Country
- B-side: "Baby Your Baby"
- Released: January 4, 1993
- Recorded: April 28–29, 1992
- Studio: Sound Stage Studios, Nashville, Tennessee
- Length: 2:16
- Label: MCA 54563
- Songwriters: Steve Dorff, John Bettis
- Producers: Tony Brown; George Strait

George Strait singles chronology
"I Cross My Heart" (1992)	"Heartland" (1993)	"When Did You Stop Loving Me" (1993)

"Heartland" is a song written by Steve Dorff and John Bettis, and recorded by American country music artist George Strait. It was released in January 1993 as the second single from his soundtrack album Pure Country. The song reached the top of the Billboard Hot Country Singles & Tracks (now Hot Country Songs) chart.

== Content ==
Serving as the film's intro, the song is an uptempo country-rocker, in which the narrator sings about the heartland of America – "The only place I feel at home" and "Where they still know wrong from right."

== Music video ==
A music video was filmed for the single, which combines a live performance of the song and short clips from the movie.

== Personnel ==
Per the liner notes of Strait's 1995 box set Strait Out of the Box. All parts were recorded on April 28, 1992, except for the electric guitar, which was recorded the following day.

- Eddie Bayers - drums
- Stuart Duncan - fiddle
- Buddy Emmons - steel guitar
- David Hungate - bass guitar
- John Barlow Jarvis - piano
- Dean Parks - electric guitar solo
- Brent Rowan - electric guitar
- Randy Scruggs - acoustic guitar
- Harry Stinson - background vocals
- George Strait - lead vocals
- Curtis Young - background vocals

== Chart performance ==
The song debuted at number 73 on the Hot Country Singles & Tracks chart dated January 2, 1993. It spent 20 weeks on that chart, and reached Number One on the chart dated March 20, 1993.

=== Charts ===
Chart (1993)	Peak position
Canada Country Singles (RPM)	1
US Hot Country Songs (Billboard)	1

=== Year-end charts ===
Chart (1993)	Position
Canada Country Tracks (RPM)	48
US Country Songs (Billboard)	51

== Certifications ==
Region	Certification	Certified units/sales
United States (RIAA)	Gold	500,000^{‡}
^{‡} Sales+streaming figures based on certification alone.
