= Isabel Glasser =

American actress

- Occupation: Actress
- Years active: 1983–present

Isabel Glasser is an American actress. She has appeared in the films Forever Young (1992), Pure Country (1992), Mother (1996), Second Chances (1998) and Mentor (2006); and on television in several of the shows within the Law & Order franchise.

== Filmography ==
=== Film ===
| Year | Title | Role | Notes |
|---|---|---|---|
| 1983 | A Marriage | Nancy | |
| 1992 | Death Ring | Lauren Sadler | Video |
| 1992 | Pure Country | Harley Tucker | |
| 1992 | Forever Young | Helen | |
| 1995 | The Surgeon | Dr. Theresa McCann | |
| 1996 | Mother | Cheryl Henderson | |
| 1998 | Tactical Assault | Jennifer Banning | Video |
| 1998 | Second Chances | Kathleen Matthews | |
| 2004 | The Kings of Brooklyn | Mom | |
| 2006 | Mentor | Margaret Burger | |
| 2006 | Fireflies | Grace | |
| TBA | Pellett | Cynde Pellett | |

=== Television ===
| Year | Title | Role | Notes |
|---|---|---|---|
| 1987–89 | Loving | Marty Edison | TV series |
| 1990 | True Blue | | "Blue Monday" |
| 1994 | The Enemy Within | Sarah McCann | TV film |
| 1994 | NYPD Blue | Christy Williamson | "The Final Adjustment", "Double Abandando" |
| 1995 | Circumstances Unknown | Deena | TV film |
| 1997 | The Pretender | Lt. Nancy Gleason | "The Better Part of Valor" |
| 1997 | Crisis Center | Stephanie Kahn | Recurring role |
| 1997 | The Rockford Files: Shoot-Out at the Golden Pagoda | Brianne Lambert | TV film |
| 1998 | Dellaventura | Lorraine | "The Human Factor" |
| 2000 | Law & Order | Patty Taylor | "Thin Ice" |
| 2003 | Law & Order: Criminal Intent | Elaine Gergis | "Probability" |
| 2003 | Third Watch | Rita Devore | "The Price of Nobility" |
| 2004 | Law & Order: Special Victims Unit | Josette Brooks | "Bound" |
| 2005 | Law & Order: Trial by Jury | Jean Nevins | "Baby Boom" |
