= Pure Country: Pure Heart =

- DVD cover
- Directed by: Damon Santostefano
- Written by: Holly Goldberg Sloan
- Produced by: Hunt Lowry; Patty Reed; Michael J. Luisi; Todd Williams
- Starring: Kaitlyn Bausch; Cozi Zuehlsdorff
- Cinematography: Bradford Lipson
- Edited by: Lizzy Calhoun
- Music by: Mandi Collier; Mary Parker; Frankie Pine
- Production companies: WWE Studios; Roserock Films
- Distributed by: Warner Bros. Home Entertainment
- Release date: August 1, 2017
- Running time: 84 minutes
- Country: United States
- Language: English

Pure Country: Pure Heart is a 2017 American country music film directed by Damon Santostefano. It was released on August 1, 2017 as the third and final film in the Pure Country trilogy. The film follows the story of two teenage sisters who travel to Nashville after discovering that their late father was a country music singer.

== Plot ==
The film opens with two high school students, Ada Spencer and her younger sister Piper, living in a rural Tennessee farmhouse with their widowed mother Elizabeth and their grandmother Meemaw. Their father died when they were young, and their mother has been raising them alone. When a water pipe bursts in the house where the girls live, they discover a Silver Star and other information about their father. Their mother has never talked about him. The girls are determined to find out more about their father. Over the next few days, the girls repeatedly lie to their mother and say they are going to the farm of Ada's friend, Justine. However, they are actually catching rides with Justine to go learn more about their father. While visiting the nearby State Veteran's Home, Luke and Dusty meet Iraq War veteran Henry Monroe. Henry tells them that he served with their father in the Marines in 2004. During their deployment, their father saved Henry's life by jumping on a grenade. They also meet C.J. Simms, a Korean War veteran and musician. C.J. is impressed by their singing voices and invites them to perform at a local music festival.

The children of a deceased country music singer discover that their father was a singer. They decide to travel to Nashville to learn more about him. While there, they meet Declan, who soon strikes up a relationship with Ada. The two of them hit it off, and start dating. Declan arranged for the sisters to meet Marq Dunn, the woman their father had worked with to write and record his music. The sisters were thrilled to finally meet the woman who had been such an important part of their father's life and career. Marq invited the sisters back to Nashville to record a song after hearing them sing. Elizabeth discovers that her sisters have been lying about their whereabouts and confronts them. In response, the sisters accuse their mother of being a liar for not telling them the truth about their father's music and military careers. Meemaw eventually reveals that their father had stopped his music of his own accord when he met Elizabeth and wanted to start a family. Their father was a musician, and Elizabeth was a singer. The film ends with Elizabeth visiting Marq and admitting that she has always felt a little jealous of her, but also guilty about taking Brian away from the musical opportunities he and Marq could have had. This leads to Ada and Piper singing one of their father's songs on stage with Willie Nelson and Marq at a fundraiser for veterans.

== Cast ==
- Kaitlyn Bausch as Ada Spencer
- Cozi Zuehlsdorff as Piper Spencer
- Dara Sisterhen as Justine Sloan
- Amanda Detmer as Elizabeth Spencer
- Laura Bell Bundy as Marq Dunn
- Matthew Barnes as Declan Martino
- Myra Turley as Meemaw
- Lawrence Turner as Henry Monroe
- Ronny Cox as CJ Simms
- Willie Nelson as himself
- Shawn Michaels as Ted

== Production ==
In 2017 it was confirmed that Shawn Michaels would perform in Pure Country: Pure Heart alongside Willie Nelson and Laura Bell Bundy.

== Soundtrack ==
=== Track listing ===
1. Keep Asking Why – Kate York
2. Stand By Me – Kaitlyn Bausch, Cozi Zuehlsdorff
3. Slide – Kaitlyn Bausch, Cozi Zuehlsdorff
4. Silver City – Ronny Cox
5. Sing A Little Higher – Matthew Barnes
6. The Grass Ain’t Greener – Laura Bell Bundy
7. Pass It On – Mostly Monas
8. We Don't Run – Kaitlyn Bausch, Cozi Zuehlsdorff
9. Nobody's Stranger Anymore – Kaitlyn Bausch, Cozi Zuehlsdorff
10. Hold On To Hope – Kaitlyn Bausch, Cozi Zuehlsdorff
11. Lean On You – Cassidy Ford, Casey Black
12. Like a Country Boy – Dallas Davidson
13. We Don't Run – Willie Nelson feat. Kaitlyn Bausch, Cozi Zuehlsdorff, Laura Bell Bundy
14. Something Calling My Name – Jill Andrews

== Release ==
Pure Country: Pure Heart initially screened at the Stagecoach Festival in Indio, California on April 30, 2017. This was followed by a direct-to-DVD release in August 2017. Per Rentrak Corp and King Features Syndicate, the movie was one of the top 10 DVD sales for the weeks of August 25 and September 3, 2017.

== Reception ==
The Spokesman-Review rated the movie at three stars. Common Sense Media's Renee Schonfeld also gave the film three stars, stating that "The movie isn't original, but it's entertaining enough, the music is fun, and resolution comes easily."

Wide Open Country's Addie Moore did a retrospective on both Pure Country: Pure Heart and Pure Country 2: The Gift in 2020. In her article she opined that the third film felt "more like a continuation of the second film than the original" but that the story would be relatable to young women. She also noted that "Like the previous two movies, it was never confused as Oscar material, but its heart was in the right place."
