= Pure Country 2: The Gift =

- Theatrical release poster
- Directed by: Christopher Cain
- Written by: Dean Cain; Christopher Cain
- Produced by: Scott Duthie; Christopher Cain; Hunt Lowry
- Starring: Katrina Elam; Travis Fimmel; Michael McKean; Cheech Marin; Bronson Pinchot; Jackie Welch; Dean Cain; William Katt; Sharon Thomas; James Remar
- Cinematography: Juan Ruiz Anchía
- Edited by: Jack Hofstra
- Music by: Steve Dorff
- Production companies: Angry Monkey Entertainment; Roserock Films
- Distributed by: Warner Bros. Pictures
- Release date: October 15, 2010
- Running time: 112 minutes
- Country: United States
- Language: English
- Box office: $133,771

Pure Country 2: The Gift is a 2010 American Western musical film directed by Christopher Cain. It is the second film in the Pure Country trilogy, and stars country music artist Katrina Elam. The film was released in the United States on October 15, 2010.

== Plot ==
The film "Pure Country 2: The Gift" tells the story of Bobbie, a young woman with a naturally beautiful voice. Bobbie leaves her small town for Nashville, hoping to become a singing superstar. Before she leaves, her Aunt Ella gives her a locket containing a picture of her mother and a one-hundred dollar bill. Aunt Ella also tells Bobbie that she will succeed beyond her wildest dreams if only she never lies, is always fair, and never breaks a promise. Bobbie lands a job at a sushi restaurant in Nashville. The restaurant is owned by a man named Morita. Bobbie is excited about the job and her new life in Nashville. Bobbie's boss, Morita, believes that anyone who is aspiring to be in the music business will not work hard in his restaurant. When he asks Bobbie if she is a singer, all his employees shake their heads no behind him. Bobbie answers "No," which breaks the first of the three rules that govern her gift. Angels in heaven wince and say "that's one." When Bobbie arrives at her new job at the sushi restaurant, she is surprised to discover that the other employees are also musicians. They have a band called "The Rising Sons." Bobbie joins their band and they convince Morita to become their manager. They are given an audition by a promoter who is a longtime customer at the sushi restaurant. Bobbie is a country singer who wants to be a star. She meets a promoter who convinces her that The Rising Sons are not talented enough to take her to the top. The angels in heaven say "that's two," meaning she's broken the second of the rules. The rules are that she can't say "it's not fair," and she can't let them go. Though she repeatedly says, "it's not fair," she eventually gives in and agrees to let them go. When Bobbie grew up, she didn't know her father and always wondered about him. Later, her single climbed the charts, and she was interviewed on a television show. The host surprised her by bringing her long-lost father on the show with her.

After exchanging harsh words, Bobbie tells him she hates him, wishes she'd never met him, and tells him to get out. When he refuses and becomes violent, Strait intervenes and has a physical altercation with him. She has, sadly, broken the third rule - never break a promise. As she heads out on stage, a strong wind blows and takes her voice - her gift - away with it. When Bobbie opens her mouth to sing, only a hoarse noise issues forth, and she runs from the stage. Bobbie visits expert after expert to try to get her voice back. She is told, more than once, that because of the way her larynx is formed, she should never have been able to sing. Her ability to sing at all was a miracle. The experts all agree that she will never sing again. Bobbie returns home to Aunt Ella and confesses that she has lost her voice. Aunt Ella already knew, because she knew every time Bobbie broke one of the three rules. Bobbie cries because singing is all she's ever done, and all she's ever wanted to do. Aunt Ella tells Bobbie that when she makes amends for the wrongs she's done, she'll be able to sing again. Aunt Ella says that Bobbie's heart is empty, but when it is full, Bobbie will sing from her heart. Aunt Ella passes away shortly after Bobbie sings from the gift. Bobbie then sets out to right the wrongs she did. She returns to Nashville and seeks forgiveness from Morita and the Rising Sons, which she receives. She arranges a charity performance to support a horse-therapy group. Her father and boyfriend are in the audience. When called to the stage, Bobbie says, "I hope you'll forgive the sound of my voice, but I'm singing from my heart. So please just listen to my heart." At the end of the movie, the gift is dancing and twirling around the angels. The angels have never seen this happen before. A new angel (Aunt Ella) tells them that Bobbie has redeemed herself, and the gift should be returned to her. The angels send the gift hurtling back to her, and her voice returns to its former glory.

== Cast ==
- Katrina Elam as Bobbie
- Travis Fimmel as Dale Jordan
- Cheech Marin as Pedro
- Bronson Pinchot as Joseph
- Jackie Welch as Aunt Ella
- Dean Cain as Music Video Director
- William Katt as Winter
- Sharon Thomas as Marilyn Montgomery
- Todd Truley as Keith Haskins
- Michael Yama as Morita
- J.D. Parker as Roy
- Krisinda Cain Schafer as Sis
- Adam Skaggs as Weston
- Heidi Brook Myers as Molly
- George Strait as himself
- Jeff Schafer as Bubba
- Jeremy Childs as Security Guard #1
- Jon Douglas Rainey as Backstage Guest (uncredited)

== Production ==
Christopher and Dean Cain began working on the script for Pure Country 2 around 1995. Of the script, screenwriter Rex McGee has stated that the Cains did not write this as a sequel and that the Pure Country title was applied after the script was picked up by Warner Bros. Pictures. Dean Cain has confirmed that this was intended to be a stand-alone project, but that "it shares the same heart and the same feel and that same sort of texture that the first one did … and in that sense it's in the same genre."

LeAnn Rimes was approached to portray Bobbie. After she declined the offer Pure Country 2 was temporary shelved. Filming for Pure Country 2 took place in Nashville and a ranch in Lebanon, Tennessee during late 2009. Katrina Elam was brought on to perform in the lead role and George Strait was reported as returning for a cameo role. This cameo appearance was later confirmed to be Strait performing as himself and not reprising his character from the first film. Several of Elam's songs were featured in the movie; she co-wrote two songs for the soundtrack and four of her then-unreleased songs were used in the movie.

== Soundtrack ==
Pure Country 2: The Gift

Soundtrack album by Katrina Elam
- Released: February 8, 2011
- Genre: Country
- Label: WaterTower Music
- Producer: Steve Dorff

Katrina Elam chronology
Katrina Elam (2004)	Pure Country 2: The Gift (2011)

The soundtrack for Pure Country 2: The Gift was released by WaterTower Music on February 15, 2011, featuring songs from the film by Katrina Elam. Prior to this the song "Dream Big" was released as a single in 2010 and per Crosswalk.com, received some radio airtime.

=== Track listing ===
1. "Might as Well Be Me" (Bobby Pinson) – 3:31
2. "Love Is" (Pinson) – 3:45
3. "Dream Big" (Steve Dorff) – 3:24
4. "That's My Man" (Danny Orton) – 3:59
5. "Would You Love Me Anyway" (Katrina Elam) – 3:57
6. "If Your Love Was a Rock" (Rachel Proctor) – 3:46
7. "Love Will Still Be There" (Dorff) – 4:07
8. "Second Chance" (Clay Mills) – 3:17
9. "Dream Big (Movie version)" (Dorff) – 3:36

=== Chart performance ===
Chart (2011)	Peak position
U.S. Billboard Top Country Albums	55
U.S. Billboard Top Heatseekers	44

== Release ==
Pure Country 2: The Gift was given a limited theatrical release in the United States on October 15, 2010. The film was given a DVD release the following year via Warner Home Video and a Blu-ray release in 2012.

== Reception ==
Joe Leydon of Variety criticized the film's marketing, which heavily emphasized George Strait in its marketing material and also noted that the movie was "such a tepid and uninspired piece of work, it will be hard-pressed to generate must-see enthusiasm among any target group." The Oklahoman was also critical while also praising Elam's acting and writing that she "gives a natural, believable performance that keeps viewers rooting for her heroine and should have country fans seeking out her music."

Dove.org praised the film for its humor and message, giving it their Dove “Family-Approved” Seal for ages 12 and over. Mario Tarradell of The Dallas Morning News was also favorable in their review, praising Bronson Pinchot, Michael McKean and Cheech Marin as angels.
