= When Did You Stop Loving Me =

Song written by Donny Kees and Monty Holmes

Single by George Strait

from the album Pure Country
- B-side: "Where the Sidewalk Ends"
- Released: April 19, 1993
- Recorded: April 15, 1992
- Genre: Neotraditional country; honky-tonk
- Length: 2:48
- Label: MCA 54642
- Songwriters: Donny Kees; Monty Holmes
- Producers: Tony Brown; George Strait

George Strait singles chronology
"Heartland" (1993)	"When Did You Stop Loving Me" (1993)	"Easy Come, Easy Go" (1993)

"When Did You Stop Loving Me" is a song written by Donny Kees and Monty Holmes and recorded by American country music artist George Strait. It was released in April 1993 as the third and final single from his album Pure Country. The song reached both No. 6 on the Billboard Hot Country Singles & Tracks chart and on the Canadian RPM Country Tracks chart.

== Chart performance ==
"When Did You Stop Loving Me" debuted at number 62 on the U.S. Billboard Hot Country Singles & Tracks for the week of May 1, 1993.

Chart (1993)	Peak position
Canada Country Singles (RPM)	6
US Hot Country Songs (Billboard)	6

=== Year-end charts ===
Chart (1993)	Position
Canada Country Tracks (RPM)	82
US Country Songs (Billboard)	72

== Other versions ==
- George Jones covered the song on his 1998 album It Don't Get Any Better Than This and on the same record label (MCA Records).
