= Steve Dorff =

American songwriter and composer

- Born: Stephen Hartley Dorff; April 21, 1949 (age 77)
- Origin: New York City, U.S.
- Genres: Country
- Occupation: Songwriter
- Years active: 1970s–present
- Website: stevedorff.com

Stephen Hartley Dorff (born April 21, 1949) is an American songwriter and composer who has written many pop music and country music songs covered by major artists, as well as film scores, TV themes, and musical theater compositions.

== Career ==
Dorff has written several songs for other artists, including "Hypnotize the Moon" and "My Heart Will Never Know" for Clay Walker, "The Man in Love with You" and "I Cross My Heart" by George Strait, "Don't Underestimate My Love for You" by Lee Greenwood, "Every Which Way but Loose" by Eddie Rabbitt and "Through the Years" by Kenny Rogers. He also composed the themes for Spenser: For Hire, Murphy Brown, The Singing Bee, Just the Ten of Us and others.

In addition, Dorff was a co-writer of the song "I Just Fall in Love Again" with composers Larry Herbstritt, Harry Lloyd, and Gloria Sklerov. "I Just Fall in Love Again", originally recorded by The Carpenters but not released as a single, became a major pop hit for Anne Murray, peaking at No. 12 on the Billboard Top 100 in 1979. Steve Dorff also wrote the music score for the song "As Long As We Got Each Other" from the popular family TV sitcom Growing Pains, with John Bettis writing the lyrics. He collaborated with Bettis again on Josephine, a musical about singer Josephine Baker.

Dorff was the music supervisor for Pure Country (1992) and Pure Country 2: The Gift (2010). Since 2009, he has been the bandleader on the CMT revival of The Singing Bee, for which he also composed the theme music.

Dorff has been nominated for three Grammy Awards and five Emmy Awards. He was inducted into the Songwriters Hall of Fame in 2018.

== Personal life and family ==
Dorff is the father of actor Stephen Dorff and songwriter Andrew Dorff, who died at age 40 on December 19, 2016.

== Filmography ==
- 1982 Waltz Across Texas
- 1982 Honkytonk Man
- 1985 Rustlers' Rhapsody
- 1987 The Quick and the Dead
- 1987 Back to the Beach
- 1987 My Best Friend Is a Vampire
- 1989 Pink Cadillac
- 1992 Pure Country
- 1995 Breaking Free
- 1996 Coyote Summer
- 1996 The Undercover Kid
- 1997 Lunker Lake
- 1998 Dancer, Texas Pop. 81
- 1999 Blast from the Past
- 1999 Dudley Do-Right
- 2000 The Cactus Kid
- 2002 Mi Amigo
- 2008 Jake's Corner
- 2010 Pure Country 2: The Gift
- 2017 The Meanest Man in Texas
- 2023 Dead Man's Hand
- 2025 The Legend of Van Dorn
