= Dan Jawitz =

South African film & TV producer (born 1960)

- Born: 1960 (age 65–66)
- Citizenship: South Africa
- Occupations: film and television producer
- Awards: Emmy award, SAFTA's

Dan Jawitz (born 1960) is a South African film and television producer. He is the co-founder of Ice Media, Fireworx Media and Known Associates Entertainment. He was a producer on François Verster's A Lion's Trail which won an Emmy at the 27th annual News and documentary Emmy Award.

== Career ==
Jawitz started in the industry as a publicist on the film Kini and Adams which was selected for Official Competition at the Cannes Film Festival (1997) and nominated for a Palme d’Or.

In 2000, he launched Ice Media with Joel Phiri in Johannesburg. Nearly 2 decades later, Jawitz and Phiri reunited to form Known Associates Entertainment with Tshepiso Chikapa Phiri.

Previous partnerships include, Fireworx Media which Jawitz established in 2008 with Neil Brandt and Bridget Pickering. He was Managing Director of the company for 10 years, producing shows for South African television, including Keeping Score (Telenovela, SABC2) and Hustle (Drama, ETV).

In 2014 he co-produced One Humanity with Tony Hollingsworth, directed by Mickey Dube, which vividly brings to life the history of the international Anti-Apartheid Movement using music, archive and interview.

He produced the Netflix hit Wild is the Wind in 2022, The Umbrella Men which was selected for the Toronto Film Festival in 2022 the sequel, The Umbrella Men: Escape from Robben Island, Snake and is an Executive Producer of Hunting Jessica Brok.

== Other work ==
Jawitz is the co-founder of SASFED, the South African Screen Federation and was a Distribution and Marketing Advisor to the South African National Film and Video Foundation from 2005 to 2014. He was also an Executive Committee member on the IPO Board for many years. Jawitz is a judge of the long form documentary section of the International Emmys.

== Accolades ==
In 2005, Jawitz won an Emmy Award for A Lion's Trail for "Most Outstanding Cultural and Artistic Achievement".
