= The Lion Sleeps Tonight =

1939 song by Solomon Linda and the Evening Birds

"Mbube"
- 1939 Singer Bantu record

Single by Solomon Linda's Original Evening Birds
- B-side: "Ngi Hambiki"
- Released: 1939
- Recorded: 1939
- Studio: Gallo Recording Studios
- Genre: Isicathamiya
- Length: 2:44
- Label: Gallo
- Songwriter: Solomon Linda

"Mbube" (Note: Mbube is Zulu for 'lion', or 'the lion'.) is a popular song written and composed by South African musician Solomon Linda in 1939. It was first published in South Africa and made its way to the United States a decade later. In 1961, the Tokens adapted the melody and added English lyrics to create "The Lion Sleeps Tonight", lending the song the name by which it is best known today.

Linda, a migrant worker, led the a cappella group the Evening Birds. In 1939, they improvised a retelling of a lion-hunting incident in Zulu that melded regional music with Western influences. The recording, "Mbube", brought Linda much fame across South Africa and steered the development of isicathamiya music. However, he had sold his rights to "Mbube" to the owner of his parent record company, Eric Gallo, for ten shillings, (Note: Ten shillings in 1939 is worth $72 in 2026 (a shilling then being a twentieth of a pound, and a pound being worth $144.74 in 2026, the latter value was halved and rounded down).) unaware of what the transaction entailed. This kept him from earning royalties. The recording was then sent to a record label in the US and eventually landed in Pete Seeger's hands; his folk quartet, the Weavers, covered the song in 1951 as "Wimoweh". (Note: Seeger misheard the chorus uyimbube as wimoweh.) Ten years later, the Tokens, a doo-wop group, encountered "Wimoweh". After changing the melody and adding English lyrics, they released their version as "The Lion Sleeps Tonight". It topped the US charts.

By the mid-2000s, some 150 artists around the world had covered the song. Its inclusion in Disney's The Lion King (1994) earned the songwriters an estimated $15 million in royalties. But Linda, then long deceased, was yet to reap recognition for his contribution to "The Lion Sleeps Tonight" or receive songwriting credits. His descendants had earned very little and remained destitute. Emboldened, they filed a lawsuit against Disney for copyright violation in 2004. Within two years, they reached an out-of-court settlement with Abilene Music, in which the firm agreed to pay the family a lump sum for past royalties and offer them a share of future revenue. The case drew international attention and bore wide legal effects, such as those on British copyright law.

Though global success has made "The Lion Sleeps Tonight" an iconic pop song, some have associated it with racial exploitation. The song and Linda's history have been analysed in several documentaries and were part of the inspiration for the 2020 film Black Is King.

== Background and release ==
Solomon Linda was born in rural Natal, southern Africa. During his childhood, he followed the minstrel Virginia Jubilee Singers' events as they toured South Africa and performed spirituals. A migrant worker and beer hall singer, he sang in a short-lived choir named the Evening Birds and founded another under the same name after the former dissolved in 1933. The new group, comprising himself as soprano, Gilbert Madondo as alto, Boy Sibiya as tenor, and Samuel Mlangeni, Gideon Mkhize, and Owen Sikhakhane as basses, performed a cappella on the weekends and quickly built a local following. Working-class culture in South Africa flourished around this time as the nation's manufacturing industry grew. After moving to Johannesburg, Linda started work as a packer at Eric Gallo's local record-pressing plant, (Note: Rian Malan suggests that Linda was given the job at Gallo's firm after recording "Mbube", not before.) the only one in black Africa. It was not long before the firm's talent scout noticed the Evening Birds and invited them to the recording studio. Such firms sought out Zulu close-harmony vocal music back then to appeal to migrant mineworkers.

During their second session at Gallo's studio, in 1939, they attempted "Mbube", accompanied by Peter Rezant on guitar, Emily Motsieloa on piano, and possibly Willie Gumede on banjo. They finished it without rehearsal after three takes. Impressed by the song, Gallo had it made into 78 rpm records. It then aired on the rediffusion, a landline that broadcast music and news across black neighbourhoods.

== Composition ==
"Mbube" (1939)
A snippet of "Mbube", performed by Solomon Linda and the Evening Birds

Performed in four-part harmony with Mlangeni, Mkhize, and Sikhakhane on bass, Madondo and Sibiya on middle tones, and Linda on soprano, "Mbube" is sung in a call and response format: the phrases of each section overlap. It follows a cyclical structure. The melody is built over three chords, and the progression borrows from the marabi harmonic cycle common in twentieth-century South African music (I-IV-I^{6/4}-V^{7}-I).

Journalist Sharon LaFraniere describes the melody as "tender ... almost childish in its simplicity". In the opinion of South African author Rian Malan, "'Mbube' wasn't the most remarkable tune, but there was something terribly compelling about the underlying chant, a dense meshing of low male voices above which Linda yodeled and howled for two minutes, mostly making it up as he went along." Of special interest to commentators are the song's final few seconds, where Linda breaks into a brief howl that Malan describes as "a haunting skein of fifteen notes". This became the melodic basis for the Tokens' cover. In a Freaky Trigger review of another cover, Tom Ewing considers "Mbube" and all versions derived from it pleasant songs to sing along to.

The lyrics, written in Zulu, are said to document an episode of Linda's childhood when he chased a lion while herding cattle. (Note: Malan presents a slightly different interpretation: that the lyrics refer to a lion-hunting incident in the Evening Birds' collective memory, not just in Linda's. Veit Erlmann follows a similar lyrical interpretation but argues that "Mbube" was based on an older wedding song, in the same vein as many early isicathamiya songs.)

Yekela yanini, yebo liyaduma amathamsanqa.
Mbube, ha, wembube. (Note: Some sources indicate uyimbube instead of wembube, and one indicates uyimbube-wo.)
Mbube, mama.

Translation:

Leave it, indeed it thunders blessings.
Lion, ha, the lion. (Note: Sources which write uyimbube instead of wembube translate it as 'you're a lion'.)
Lion, mother.

— In Veit Erlmann (1996)

The chorus "wembube" repeats throughout. "Mbube" draws heavily from Western influences introduced by missionaries and white singing troupes, such as four-part harmony; as music historian Veit Erlmann asserts, the main body "displays only a few features which can be said to be rooted in traditional performance practice". These Western elements, argues journalist Lior Phillips, enabled "Mbube" to later bear fruit globally. Erlmann notes that the song's triadic structure and harmonic progression resemble urban, Western genres and that by contrast, the metrically free introduction mirrors traditional dance music. The vocal lines are meant to evoke tin whistles typical of South African street music.

== Release and effect on Linda and South African music ==
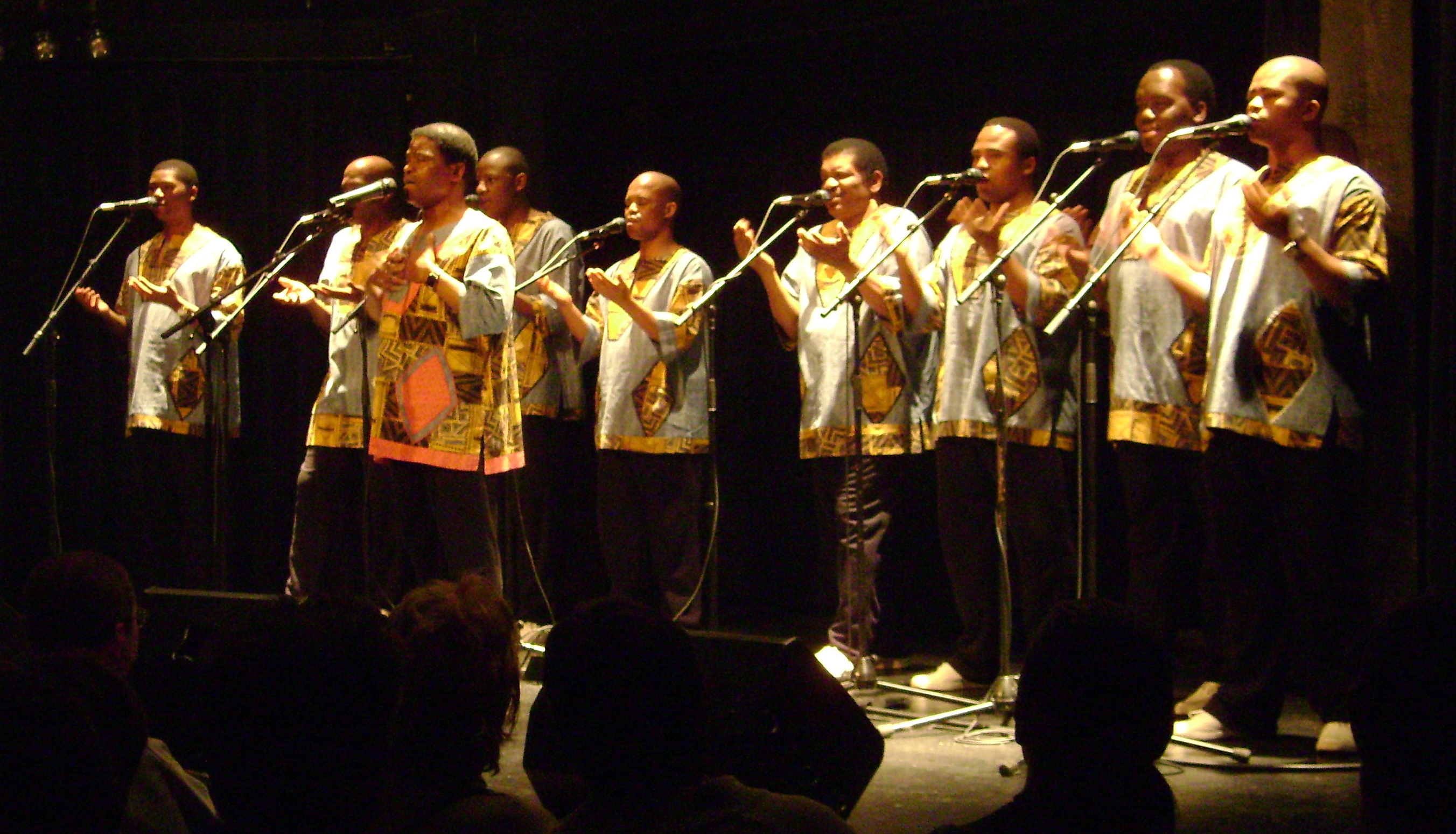
Ladysmith Black Mambazo, a prominent isicathamiya group of the latter twentieth and early twenty-first centuries, performing in 2008

"Mbube" achieved widespread success. With over 100,000 copies of the song sold in Africa over the next nine years, Erlmann considers it the first South African "hit". According to Malan, Linda became "a legend in the Zulu subculture", and his band went on to dominate all-night song competitions. But he did not profit; he sold his rights to "Mbube" to Eric Gallo for ten shillings just after the recording session. Gallo also paid him the equivalent of $2 for the first run of a few hundred records. Seeing that Linda could not read and did not understand royalties, a South African court would deem this deal unfair by 2006. The Evening Birds remained prominent performers until their disbanding in 1948. But Linda never attained wealth or fortune; he lived in a house with a dirt floor coated in cow manure and suffered the death of one of his children from malnutrition. In 1959, he collapsed onstage, which doctors ruled a result of kidney failure, and died three years later aged 53. At the time of his death, his bank account held roughly $40 in today's money. (Note: Different figures are suggested. Sharon Lafraniere (2006) writes that Linda died with $22 in his account, worth $35.66 in 2026, but Simon Robinson (2004) denotes $25, worth $43.25.) His family could not afford a tombstone.

"Mbube" defined contemporary South African music and the isicathamiya genre; isicathamiya is a form of a cappella choral song stemming from traditional Zulu music "rehearsed and performed after hours in migrant workers' hostels" along with Western, Christian influences, writes Gwen Ansell. The word mbube, now shorthand for male a cappella choral singing in South Africa, (Note: According to David B. Coplan, the ingoma busuku style adopted the name "mbube" after the song's release.) lent its name to a distinct music style, a style that anthropologist David B. Coplan argues "appealed across the class spectrum, melodised a growing African nationalism, created nostalgia for a lost society, and fused urban and rural values". In Erlmann's words, "Mbube" was "canonic for an entire generation of performers". For instance, all subsequent South African music styles adopted its booming I-IV-V bass patterns.

== The Weavers version ==
"Wimoweh"
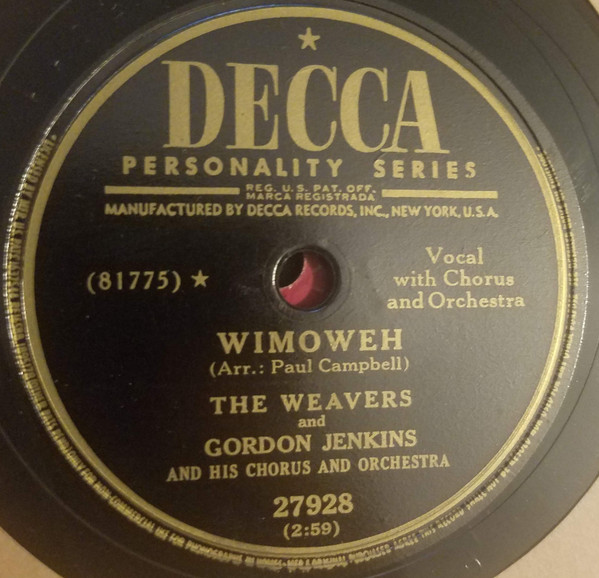
- 1951 Decca vinyl record

Single by the Weavers
- Released: December 1951
- Recorded: c. 1951
- Genre: Folk
- Length: 2:59
- Label: Folkways
- Songwriter: Paul Campbell (pseudonym)

Audio
- The Weavers – Wimoweh on YouTube

Live version
- Wimoweh (Live At Carnegie Hall, 1955) on YouTube

Some years later, Gallo sent a bundle of records to Decca Records in the United States. They were about to be discarded before Decca employee and ethnomusicologist Alan Lomax salvaged them; among these records was "Mbube". He handed the box over to folk singer Pete Seeger of the Weavers. A penniless banjo player, Seeger became a musician after quitting university and acquainting himself with popular songs of the Great Depression. "Mbube" intrigued him; he promptly transcribed it word for word but misheard the chorus as wimoweh. "What really grabbed Pete ... was the high, wordless falsetto that floated on top and—most especially—where it landed, in a secondary melody, sad and sweet", writes Jesse Jarnow in his Weavers biography.

Seeger convened the Weavers at the Village Vanguard to record it. He tried to describe the vocal parts as he heard them, and they eventually settled on a repeated chant of "wimoweh, a-wimoweh" with Seeger performing falsettos. As Malan argues, their recording "was faithful to the Zulu original in almost all respects save for the finger-popping rhythm". To broaden its appeal, bandleader Gordon Jenkins composed a brass accompaniment that stressed Linda's brief howl towards the end of "Mbube".

The Weavers released "Wimoweh" in December 1951; Seeger later said it was "just about my favorite song to sing for the next forty years". Shortly after its release, Gallo sold "Mbube" to the American Richmond Organization in exchange for the rights to administer "Wimoweh" in some bush territories. Even though records of Linda's work contained the words African Music Research Copyright Control, Richmond claimed it was a folk song. All songwriting credits were thus given to the fictitious Paul Campbell, a tactic allowing the Weavers to claim royalties on songs from the public domain even if "Mbube" was copyrighted. Such a practice was common then. Royalties for "Wimoweh" were split two ways: half went to the Weavers' publishers—Howard Richmond (of The Richmond Organization) and Albert Brackman—and their manager Pete Kameron, and the other half to the Weavers. None went to Linda.

The song reached No. 6 on the US charts, (Note: Joel Whitburn, in his list of pop songs that charted on Billboard from 1955 to 2002, indicates "Wimoweh" as having peaked at No. 14.) but this success briefly crashed when Harvey Matusow, a prolific informer of the McCarthy era, accused three of the Weavers of being affiliated with the Communist Party. Nonetheless, it grew into a Weavers standard. The song's profile rose when they performed it at Carnegie Hall in 1957. Jimmy Dorsey and the Kingston Trio recorded covers around this time.

=== Charts ===
Weekly chart performance
Chart (1952)	Peak position
US Billboard chart	6
US Cash Box Top 100	13

== The Tokens version ==
"The Lion Sleeps Tonight"
- 1961 RCA vinyl record

Single by the Tokens

from the album The Lion Sleeps Tonight
- A-side: "Tina"
- Released: October 1961
- Recorded: 1961
- Genre: Pop; doo-wop; folk
- Length: 2:41
- Label: RCA Victor
- Songwriters: Solomon Linda; Hugo Peretti; Luigi Creatore; George David Weiss; Albert Stanton
- Producers: Hugo Peretti; Luigi Creatore

The Tokens singles chronology
"Sincerely" (1961)	"The Lion Sleeps Tonight" (1961)	"B'wa Nina (Pretty Girl)" (1962)

Audio
- "The Lion Sleeps Tonight (Wimoweh)" on YouTube

Audio sample
- file; help

Malan writes that by the end of the 1950s, "almost everyone in America knew the basic refrain" of "Wimoweh". After hearing a live Weavers performance of the song, (Note: According to Malan, the Tokens came across the song on a Weavers album. They then contacted the South African consulate, which jokingly described "Mbube" as a "Zulu hunting song" about "eating lions".) the Tokens, a teen doo-wop group from Brooklyn, decided to record their version. They had already attained a hit, "Tonight I Fell in Love", and signed up with RCA for a three-record contract commencing in 1961. Their first two records, "When I Go to Sleep at Night/Dry Your Eyes" and "Sincerely", struggled commercially, but their third would fare better.

For their third attempt, the Tokens approached musician George David Weiss and solicited an overhaul of "Wimoweh" to give it a modern sound and intelligible lyrics. He purged the song of its shrieks and hollers while leaving the chant unchanged and made Linda's final improvised notes the new tune. Thirty-three words were added as English lyrics beginning with "In the jungle, the mighty jungle, the lion sleeps tonight". Jarnow notes that the lyrics were based on "a vague understanding of ["Mbube"]'s title". Further, Ewing questions whether the lion sleeping is a metaphor or gibberish, and whether the song is an anthem for freedom or a nursery rhyme. The Tokens then recorded Weiss' version, with Jay Siegel performing falsettos, the rest of the band chanting "wimoweh", and guest opera singer Anita Darian singing very high-pitched, pronounced countermelodies. (Note: Darian was not given credit for her performance.) Accompanying them were an orchestra, a percussionist on timpani, and session musicians on guitar, drums, and bass. Hugo Peretti and Luigi Creatore produced the piece. Ultimately, "The Lion Sleeps Tonight" did not much enthrall the Tokens, and the song was released in October 1961 as a B-side. Linda again received no credit.

Though the A-side "Tina" failed, "The Lion Sleeps Tonight" rose to No. 1 on the US charts and in several other countries. Many covers of the song found similar success in the years to come. According to writers Marti Smiley Childs and Jeff March, "The Lion Sleeps Tonight" was the first African song to top the US charts. The Tokens subsequently became music producers, and though their fame as performers waned—only landing their next top 40 US single four years later—they flourished in their new role. Among their productions was the Chiffons' "He's So Fine".

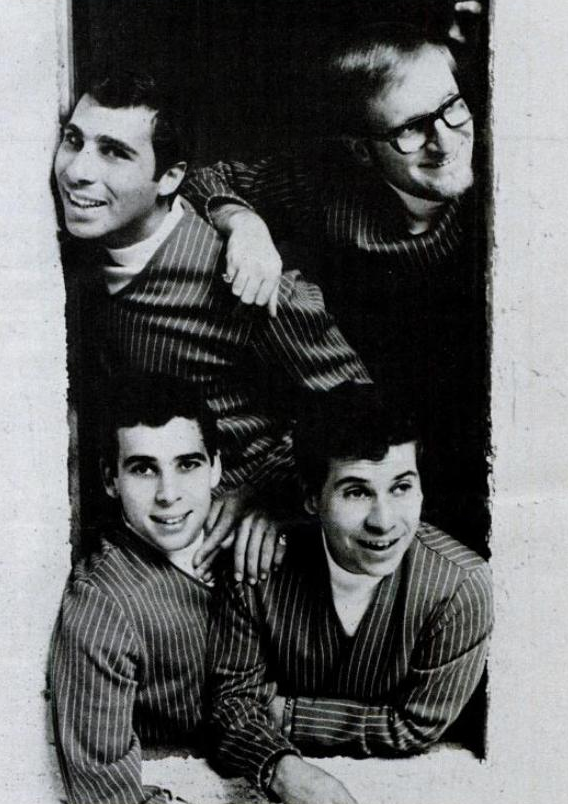
The Tokens pictured in 1967

=== Charts ===
==== Weekly charts ====
Chart (1961–1962)	Peak position
Australia (Kent Music Report)	7
Belgium (Ultratop 50 Flanders)	6
Belgium (Ultratop 50 Wallonia)	13
Canada CHUM Chart	1
Italy (Musica e dischi)	14
New Zealand Lever	1
UK Singles (OCC)	11
US Billboard Hot 100	1
US Cash Box Top 100	1
West Germany (GfK)	23

Chart (1994)	Peak position
US Billboard Hot 100	51

==== Year-end charts ====
Chart (1962)	Rank
US Cash Box Top 100	10

=== Certifications ===
Region	Certification	Certified units/sales
New Zealand (RMNZ)	Gold	15,000^{‡}
United Kingdom (BPI) Sales since 2004	Silver	200,000^{‡}
United States (RIAA)	Gold	1,000,000^{^}
^{^} Shipments figures based on certification alone.^{‡} Sales+streaming figures based on certification alone.

== Further commercial use ==
By the mid-2000s, "Mbube" had been recorded by over 150 artists worldwide and served a role in more than thirteen movies. Many are covers of the Tokens' version, which includes Robert John's, ascending to No. 3 in the US a decade later, and Tight Fit's, topping the United Kingdom charts in 1982. Beyond the English-speaking world, a cover by Swedish pop group the Hounds became a large hit in the Nordic countries in 1967, and French and Japanese covers achieved chart success in the 1990s. Miriam Makeba performed "Mbube" at President John F. Kennedy's 1962 birthday. In 1994, "The Lion Sleeps Tonight" came into the spotlight when it featured in the Disney film The Lion King; the film would gross nearly $1 billion and spawn numerous soundtrack CDs. It was later included in the 1997 staged musical of the same name, still the highest-grossing Broadway show of all time. The 2019 Lion King remake also used a version of "The Lion Sleeps Tonight" sung by Seth Rogen and Billy Eichner.

=== Notable covers ===
==== Karl Denver ====
"Wimoweh"
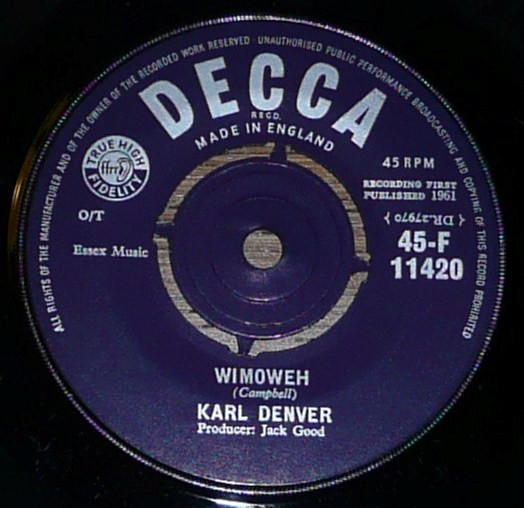
- 1961 Decca vinyl record

Single by Karl Denver

from the album Wimoweh
- B-side: "Gypsy Davy"
- Released: late 1961 (Note: Seeing that it was released after the Tokens' version, which came out in October.)
- Length: 2:30
- Label: Decca
- Songwriters: George David Weiss; Hugo Peretti; Luigi Creatore; Paul Campbell; Albert Stanton
- Producer: Jack Good

Audio
- "Wimoweh" on YouTube

Karl Denver, born in Glasgow, Scotland, spent much of his youth at sea and eventually served in the Korean War. He was wounded; while recovering, he practised the guitar and grew interested in folk and country music. Upon settling in Lancashire, England, he performed in pubs and clubs. His hallmark piece was a cover of "Wimoweh", which Spencer Leigh of The Independent notes for its "octave-spanning acrobatics" and "electrifying" nature. He claimed to have learned "Wimoweh" in South Africa as a seaman. Denver's recording of "Wimoweh" was held off from being released until 1961, shortly after the Tokens' "The Lion Sleeps Tonight" came out. It reached No. 4 in the UK and remains his best-known song.

Weekly chart performance
Chart (1962)	Peak position
UK Singles (OCC)	4

==== Robert John ====
"The Lion Sleeps Tonight"
- 1972 Atlantic vinyl record

Single by Robert John

from the album Robert John
- B-side: "Janet"
- Released: 1971
- Genre: Adult contemporary
- Length: 2:32
- Label: Atlantic
- Songwriters: Hugo Peretti; Luigi Creatore; George David Weiss; Albert Stanton
- Producers: Hank Medress; Dave Appell

Robert John singles chronology
"When the Party Is Over" (1970)	"The Lion Sleeps Tonight" (1971)	"Hushabye" (1972)

Audio
- "The Lion Sleeps Tonight" on YouTube

As a child, Robert John sang with street-corner doo-wop groups; he first achieved chart success aged twelve. In the 1960s, he partnered with songwriter Michael Gately to pen the hit "If You Don't Want My Love" and other songs, some of which were written especially for other artists. His solo efforts "took off", in music journalist Jon Blistein's words, when he covered the Tokens' "The Lion Sleeps Tonight" in 1971. It reached No. 3 on the Billboard Hot 100 and sold over a million records. Since Atlantic Records kept him from producing an album, John then broke from singing before returning in the late 1970s.

===== Charts =====
====== Weekly charts ======
Chart (1971–1972)	Peak position
Australia (Go-Set)	15
Australia (Kent Music Report)	31
Canada Singles Chart (RPM)	15
Canada Adult Contemporary (RPM)	17
New Zealand (Listener)	16
South Africa (Springbok)	15
US Billboard Hot 100	3
US Adult Contemporary (Billboard)	6
US Cash Box Top 100	2
West Germany (GfK)	40

====== Year-end charts ======
Chart (1972)	Rank
Canada RPM Year-End	45
US Billboard Hot 100	21
US Cash Box Top 100	10

===== Certifications =====
Region	Certification	Certified units/sales
United States (RIAA)	Gold	1,000,000^{^}
^{^} Shipments figures based on certification alone.

==== Flemming Jørgensen ====
"Vimmersvej"

Song by Bamses Venner
- Released: 1975
- Recorded: c. 1975
- Length: 2:53
- Label: Nordisk Copyright Bureau
- Songwriters: George Weiss; Albert Stanton; Hugo Peretti; Luigi Creatore; Paul Campbell; Solomon Linda
- Producer: Jørgen Kleinert

Official audio
- "Vimmersvej" on YouTube

2003 rerecording
- "Vimmersvej 2" on YouTube

Flemming "Bamse" Jørgensen, leader of the band Bamses Venner, released a cover of the Tokens' "The Lion Sleeps Tonight" in 1975 with new Danish lyrics, which he reportedly wrote in ten minutes. Named "Vimmersvej", it was a big success and proved Jørgensen's first and largest hit. He duly paid the Tokens' publishers their share but remained unaware of Linda's role in creating "The Lion Sleeps Tonight". Twenty-eight years on, in 2003, he learned about the song's history from a television programme covering Linda's daughters. Jørgensen and his band resented the fact that Linda's family had lost what they thought was their deserved money. To raise some of this lost money for them, he decided to record "Vimmersvej" anew; he could not redirect profits from the original "Vimmersvej" to Linda's family. He wished for Linda's daughters to sing on his recording, and two of them eventually did. The new song came out in March 2003; its earnings, totalling about 40,000 kroner by 2016, were sent to Linda's three daughters. (Note: Equating to roughly $8,000 in 2026.) According to Danish journalist Jan Eriksen (2016), Jørgensen was the only musician out of the 150 or so who covered "Mbube", or its offspring, to make amends to Linda's family. In 2018, a small side road in the Danish town of Thisted was renamed Vimmersvej in his honour.

==== Charts ====
Weekly chart performance
Chart (1975–1976)	Peak position
Danish (IFPI Danmark)	1

==== Tight Fit ====
"The Lion Sleeps Tonight"
- 1982 Jive vinyl record

Single by Tight Fit

from the album Tight Fit
- B-side: "I'm Dancing in the Street"
- Released: c. January 1982
- Length: 3:08
- Label: Jive
- Songwriters: Hugo Peretti; Luigi Creatore; George David Weiss; Albert Stanton; Solomon Linda
- Producer: Tim Friese-Greene

Tight Fit singles chronology
"Back to the Sixties Part II" (1981)	"The Lion Sleeps Tonight" (1982)	"Fantasy Island" (1982)

Music video
- "The Lion Sleeps Tonight" on YouTube

Tight Fit's cover of "The Lion Sleeps Tonight" was the UK's fourth best-selling single in 1982. That year, their rendition of "Fantasy Island" was also one of the best-selling UK singles. In its review of the band's eponymous 1982 album, Pop Rescue notes the song's "tom-tom-laden drums and Tarzan-like vocals". Ewing describes it as "a panto season singalong" and suspects that the recent successes of Adam Ant and Bow Wow Wow drove producer Tim Friese-Greene to quickly release "an African drums cash-in" single.

===== Charts =====
====== Weekly charts ======
Chart (1982)	Peak position
Australia (Kent Music Report)	11
Austria (Ö3 Austria Top 40)	8
Belgium (Ultratop 50 Flanders)	1
Ireland (Irish Singles Chart)	1
Netherlands (Dutch Top 40)	1
Netherlands (Single Top 100)	1
New Zealand (Official New Zealand Music Chart)	3
Sweden (Topplistan)	17
Switzerland (Swiss Hitparade)	8
UK Singles (OCC)	1
West Germany (GfK)	3

Chart (2023)	Peak position
Hungary (Single Top 40)	36

====== Year-end charts ======
Chart (1982)	Position
Australia (Kent Music Report)	82
Belgium (Ultratop Flanders)	11
Netherlands (Dutch Top 40)	11
Netherlands (Single Top 100)	11
West Germany (GfK)	46

===== Certifications =====
Region	Certification	Certified units/sales
United Kingdom (BPI)	Gold	500,000^{^}
^{^} Shipments figures based on certification alone.

=== List of recordings that charted ===
Key
A cover of Linda's "Mbube"
A cover of the Weavers' "Wimoweh"
A cover of the Tokens' "The Lion Sleeps Tonight"
A cover, direct or indirect, of Gloria Lasso's "Le lion est mort ce soir" (Note: Translating into The Lion Died Tonight.)

List of releases, with origin and relevant chart positions
Year	Title Artist	Country of origin	Peak chart positions															Notes
Year	Title Artist	Country of origin	AUL	AUT	BEL (Wa)	CAN	DEN	FIN	FRA	GER	ICE	NLD	SWE (KV)	SWE (TiT)	SWI	UK	US	Notes
1951	"Wimoweh"; The Weavers	United States	See § The Weavers version															
1961	"The Lion Sleeps Tonight"; The Tokens	United States	See § The Tokens version															
1961	"The Lion Sleeps Tonight"; Karl Denver	United Kingdom	See § Karl Denver															
1962	"Le lion est mort ce soir" Henri Salvador	France	——	——	3	——	——	——	——	——	——	——	——	——	——	——	——	
1966	"The Lion Sleeps Tonight"; The Townsmen	Canada	——	——	——	70	——	——	——	——	——	——	——	——	——	——	——	
1967	"The Lion Sleeps Tonight"; The Hounds	Sweden	——	——	——	——	8	7	——	——	——	——	1	1	——	——	——	
1968	"The Lion Sleeps Tonight"; Love Machine	Australia	26	——	——	——	——	——	——	——	——	——	——	——	——	——	——	
1971	"The Lion Sleeps Tonight"; Robert John	United States	See § Robert John															
1972	"The Lion Sleeps Tonight"; Dave Newman	United Kingdom	——	——	——	——	——	——	——	——	——	——	——	——	——	34	——	
1975	"Vimmersvej"; Flemming Jørgensen	Denmark	See § Flemming Jørgensen															
1982	"The Lion Sleeps Tonight"; Tight Fit	United Kingdom	See § Tight Fit															
1986	"The Lion Sleeps Tonight"; The Nylons	Canada	——	——	——	91	——	——	——	——	——	——	——	——	——	——	——	
1992	"Le lion est mort ce soir" Pow woW	France	——	——	——	——	——	——	4	——	——	——	——	——	——	——	——	
1993	"The Lion Sleeps Tonight"; R.E.M.	United States	——	——	——	——	——	——	——	——	2	——	——	——	——	——	——	(Note: It also placed at 47 in Iceland's year-end charts.)
2000	"The Lion Sleeps Tonight"; Jungle Rumble	United Kingdom	——	——	——	——	——	——	——	——	——	——	——	——	——	80	——	
2003	"The Lion Sleeps Tonight"; The Cooldown Café ft. Gerard Joling	Netherlands	——	——	——	——	——	——	——	——	——	82	——	——	——	——	——	
2004	"The Lion Sleeps Tonight"; Daniel Küblböck	Germany	——	29	——	——	——	——	——	7	——	——	——	——	37	——	——	

== Controversies and legal issues ==
=== 1951–1990: Early conflict ===
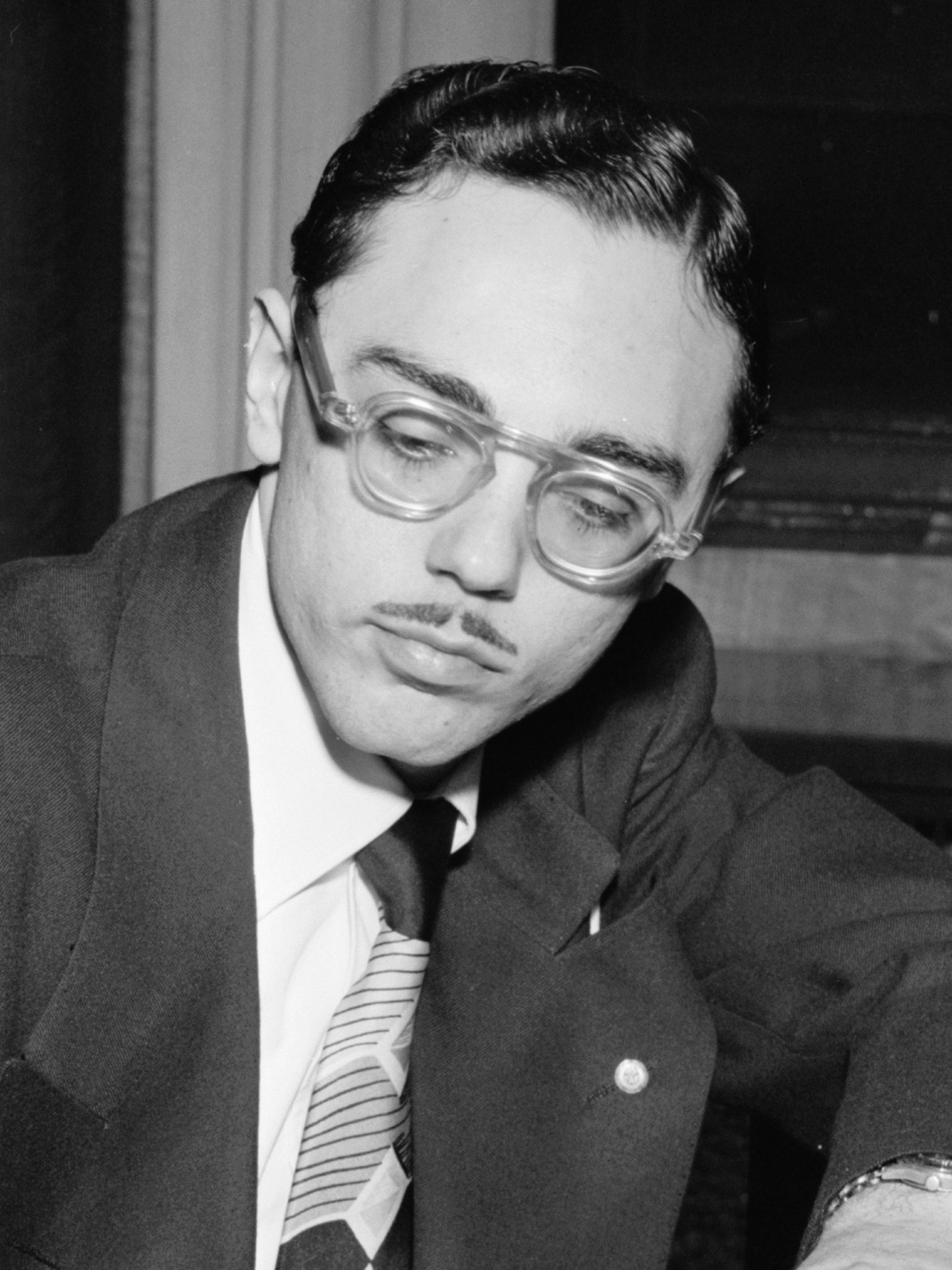
George David Weiss as pictured in 1947

Conflict over songwriting credits and royalty payments has engulfed "Wimoweh" and "The Lion Sleeps Tonight" ever since their release. The earliest dispute dates to around 1951. Upon learning that Linda would not be granted songwriting royalties, Seeger protested that Linda, as the "true" author of "Wimoweh", should receive his due. He directed his publisher to send Linda the royalties, at one point dispatching a $1,000 cheque himself. Linda's daughters later denied that consistent payments for "Wimoweh" had been made ever since the 1950s. Nonetheless, Seeger stated that "I never got author's royalties on 'Wimoweh'. ... I assumed [the song's publishers] were keeping the publisher's fifty percent and sending the rest". In 1971, The Richmond Organization acknowledged that the song was based on "Mbube", and since then, Linda's family has received royalty payments totalling 12.5 percent of "Wimoweh'"s overall earnings.

The next dispute concerned the Tokens' revision. Hugo Peretti, Luigi Creatore, and George David Weiss credited "The Lion Sleeps Tonight" solely to themselves, thinking the Weavers' tune was based on traditional African music and hence could not be copyrighted; this was untrue. As the song was achieving widespread success, Howard Richmond insisted that the trio cede publishing rights back to the Weavers. They complied, and the Tokens retained full songwriting credits.

However, the conflict was not resolved. In 1989, the copyright on "The Lion Sleeps Tonight" was about to expire, and Weiss demanded Richmond and Brackman pay him and his fellow songwriters a generous bonus lest he renew the song's copyright without crediting them at all. Richmond and Brackman accused Weiss' team of plagiarising the Weavers' recording, but the latter retorted that they had received permission to adapt the song in 1961. The dispute made its way to court a year later. There, litigants representing The Richmond Organization argued that the 1961 permission was "inaccurate" and tried to expose Weiss for adapting "Mbube" without making due payments to Linda's family. The court eventually ruled in favour of Weiss' team, Judge John Keenan declaring their adaptation of "Wimoweh" a separate composition. Weiss' team retained rights over "The Lion Sleeps Tonight", but the court ordered them to send ten percent of performance royalties—profits made whenever the composition was broadcast—to Linda's family. By 1992, Abilene Music had acquired the rights to "The Lion Sleeps Tonight".

=== Early 2000s: Linda rediscovered ===
In spite of the song's immense fame, Linda's family had earned very little in royalties, and Linda himself had been all but forgotten. Earnings from covers of the Tokens' version were funnelled into the American publishers since theirs was taken to be an original recording. Due to this, in 2000, South African journalist Rian Malan penned an essay for Rolling Stone which shed light on the origins of "The Lion Sleeps Tonight". He told the story of "Mbube", its rise to international success, and the struggles faced by Linda's daughters, and concluded that "The Lion Sleeps Tonight" had earned some $15 million in royalties. Two years later, fellow South African François Verster directed a documentary about Linda and "Mbube", A Lion's Trail. In the view of writers Håvard Ovesen and Adam Haupt, it "seeks to obtain justice for a man marginalised by his status as a black African musician in a racist and exploitative environment". Both Malan's essay and Verster's documentary brought Linda's history to public attention.

=== 2004–2019: The Lion King ===
It's the story of a song we all know, the impoverished Zulu migrant worker who wrote it, the musicians and record companies who raked in millions for it, and the almost 70 years it has taken for his family to see justice done.

— Mary Alexander

At the turn of the century, Linda's family was still desperately poor, living in what BBC News described as "a tiny township house of three rooms, an outside toilet, and an asbestos roof without a ceiling". Five of his eight children had died. But with Malan's article sparking interest in their condition, they decided to act. They started publicly calling for the royalties from "The Lion Sleeps Tonight" they thought were due to them. The South African government supported their cause, and the Gallo Record Company vowed to pay their legal fees. Some time later, in July 2004, they sued Disney for 10 million rand for using the song in The Lion King. (Note: This makes $1.6 million, worth $2.77 million in 2026.) (Note: Other sources give the demanded sum at $1.5 million instead, equating to $2.59 million in 2026.) The family also demanded 6 million rand from three South African companies profiting from royalties. (Note: 6 million rand is worth $970,000, or $1.68 million in 2026.) Steering their case was a South African lawyer and copyright expert named Owen Dean. He argued that they received some $15,000 in royalties from 1991 to 2000, roughly spanning the period of The Lion King's success, while the song earned an estimated total of $15 million. "There has ... been a misappropriation of South African culture—the song is thought to be American", he said.

The fact that Linda's daughters and his wife, who was illiterate, had signed away the rights to the song on three separate occasions complicated their case. Disney pledged to fight the suit, responding to the family's accusations of copyright violations thus: "Solomon Linda's widow assigned all rights in 'Mbube' to [a music publisher] more than 20 years ago and did so with the assistance of legal counsel." It also maintained that Abilene Music, which held the US copyright to "The Lion Sleeps Tonight", had given it the rights to use the song. While acknowledging that Disney's statement was correct, Dean made the case that Abilene Music was still liable for copyright infringement since, under the Copyright Act 1911, the rights had reverted to Linda's heirs 25 years after his death. Billboard wrote in 2004 that depending on the outcome, the Lindas' effort could shift the fortunes of other South African artists who had unknowingly ceded their rights. The case garnered attention all over the world, and a trial was set for February 2006.

But it was settled shortly before the opening date. Abilene Music agreed to pay the family a lump sum representing royalties earned from 1987 onwards and grant them a share of future income until 2017. (Note: South African copyright ends half a century after the artist's death, meaning that the song's copyright should have expired in 2012—50 years after Linda's death in 1962—but it was extended to 2017.) Although the amount was not made known, the family's lawyers claimed the family "should be quite comfortable". (Note: Alternatively, Dean said that the terms of the settlement went "far beyond our wildest dreams. It was an amazing, generous settlement offer".) The profits were to be collected in a trust. Linda was recognised for his work and received a cowriting credit on "The Lion Sleeps Tonight". According to Dean, the settlement allowed that:

- The Linda heirs will receive payment for past uses of "The Lion Sleeps Tonight" and an entitlement to future royalties from its worldwide use.
- "The Lion Sleeps Tonight" is acknowledged as derived from "Mbube".
- Solomon Linda is acknowledged as a co-composer of "The Lion Sleeps Tonight" and will be designated as such in the future.
- A trust will be formed to administer the heirs' copyright in "Mbube" and to receive on their behalf the payments due out of the use of "The Lion Sleeps Tonight".

The case set a precedent that under British copyright law, "heirs of authors who are not benefiting from the copyrighted works of their forbears [could] obtain remuneration arising from the exploitation of such works", not just in South Africa, but in any former British colony where the Copyright Act was law. Before the settlement, the court had acknowledged that Linda likely sold "Mbube" under unfair circumstances. South Africa's East Coast Radio suggests that the case spurred on other families of artists, such as Bob Marley's, to consider legal action.

Independent of the case, The Richmond Organization admitted in September 2004 to not paying enough royalties to Linda's heirs for a published version of "Mbube", promising to donate $3,000 annually and finance a memorial to Linda. Musicologist Carol A. Muller notes that Linda enjoyed no legal rights as a black South African in the pre-apartheid years of segregation; by the time his family filed a lawsuit, apartheid had been abolished, and South Africa had become a democracy. In 2012, "Mbube" fell into the public domain in South Africa. According to one of Linda's grandsons, the family earned approximately between $20,000 and $65,000 a year from "The Lion Sleeps Tonight" while the settlement terms were active, whereas another source indicates that Linda's daughters each earned around $250,000 in the decade following the settlement.

As of 2020, "The Lion Sleeps Tonight" continued to cause legal conflict. The Linda family's settlement with Disney became void in 2017, keeping them from profiting from the 2019 film The Lion King that sampled a version of the song. Linda's grandson stated: "There was no courtesy of informing the family about inclusion of a new version of the song in the movie. And we are not convinced the family is not supposed to derive revenue from the use of a new version of 'The Lion Sleeps Tonight' and are currently in the process of procuring legal advice." Nonetheless, Rolling Stone estimates that Linda's heirs would have only received a few thousand dollars in royalties from the movie.

== Legacy ==
A Zulu on the far side of the planet writes a 13-note melody that flies off and takes root in the brain of a radical American folksinger who turns it into 'Wimoweh', which in turn gives birth to 'The Lion Sleeps Tonight', which goes through about 12 hit cycles over the next 60 years. ... I love that part of the story, the improbable cultural transfers and misunderstandings, the strange musical mutations, the rich mix of characters ... But that's a story about music. The parallel story about money has been less inspiring.

— Rian Malan

"Mbube" is one of the most commercially successful pop songs ever released, and according to some writers, the most famous melody born in Africa. It and its covers have been recorded by well over a hundred artists around the world: Glen Campbell, R.E.M., Bert Kaempfert, Yma Sumac, the Mahotella Queens, and others. More than thirteen movies sample it. Malan further describes the Tokens' "The Lion Sleeps Tonight" as an "immortal pop epiphany".

Its legacy is more complicated. Because of the copyright issues surrounding it, journalists David Browne and Simon Robinson deem "The Lion Sleeps Tonight" one of pop music's most contentious tunes. The song's association with long-running racial and, in Ovesen and Haupt's view, capitalist exploitation has been discussed in several articles and papers. Malan likens Linda's story of injustice to that of other black musicians such as Huddie Ledbetter, an American blues singer who "lost half of his publishing to his white 'patrons'". At the same time, he says Linda had sold "Mbube" by choice and that the deal was legal.

Some scholars draw a parallel between the Linda family's legal victory and the eventual recognition of his own efforts, with South Africa's move from apartheid to democracy. According to Muller, "Mbube" "[opened] the doors to South African music and musicians abroad in the twentieth century"; he cites Paul Simon's 1986 album Graceland, which absorbs elements from isicathamiya, as an example. Ovesen and Haupt's view is more nuanced. They contend that although justice seems to have been served for Linda, "the power structures that enable the continuation of huge socio-economic disparities are still in place".

The history of "Mbube" and the plight of Linda's daughters have been chronicled. Beyond Malan's essay and Verster's documentary, they were covered in the 2019 Netflix documentary ReMastered: The Lion's Share. Beyoncé's 2020 musical film Black Is King in part came into being after she learned that Linda was not recognised for his contribution to "The Lion Sleeps Tonight". In the film, the original "Mbube" is used rather than the Tokens' version.

In October 2025, user xerias_x sampled an excerpt of the song for an AI video that shows Donald Trump's face plastered over the body of a lion and the faces of several Democratic politicians superimposed on other animals. Trump shared part of the video on social media four months later, depicting Barack and Michelle Obama as apes while "The Lion Sleeps Tonight" plays in the background.

== Bibliography ==
=== Books and academic papers ===
- Ansell, Gwen (2005). Soweto Blues: Jazz, Popular Music, and Politics in South Africa. New York City, New York: Continuum International Publishing Group. ISBN 0-8264-1753-1.
- Childs, Marti Smiley; March, Jeff (2011). "Chapter III: The Lion Sleeps Tonight, The Tokens". Echoes of the Sixties. United States: EditPros LLC. pp. 49–76. ISBN 978-1-937317-02-7.
- Coplan, David B. (2008). In Township Tonight!: South Africa's Black City Music and Theatre. Chicago, Illinois: The University of Chicago Press. ISBN 978-0-226-11567-2.
- Dean, Owen (April 2006). "The Return of the Lion" (PDF). WIPO Magazine. Geneva, Switzerland. Archived (PDF) from the original on 25 November 2023.
- Erlmann, Veit (1996). "The History of Isicathamiya, 1891–1991". Nightsong: Performance, Power, and Practice in South Africa. Chicago, Illinois: The University of Chicago Press. pp. 40–95. ISBN 0-226-21721-3.
- Erlmann, Veit (2004). "Fantasies of Home: The antinomies of modernity and the music of Ladysmith Black Mambazo". In Frith, Simon (ed.). Popular Music: Critical Concepts in Media and Cultural Studios. Vol. 4. New York City, New York: Routledge. pp. 266–282. ISBN 0-415-33270-2.
- Jarnow, Jesse (2018). Wasn't That a Time: The Weavers, the Blacklist, and the Battle for the Soul of America. New York City, New York: Da Capo Press, Routledge. ISBN 978-0-306-90207-9.
- Malan, Rian (2012). "In the Jungle". The Lion Sleeps Tonight and Other Stories of Africa. New York City, New York: Grove Atlantic. pp. 57–85. ISBN 978-0-8021-1990-2.
- Muller, Carol A. (2008). Focus: Music of South Africa (2 ed.). New York City, New York: Routledge. ISBN 978-0-415-96071-7.
- Ovesen, Håvard; Haupt, Adam (October 2011). "Vindicating Capital: Heroes and Villains in A Lion's Trail". Ilha do Desterro (61): 73–107. doi:10.5007/2175-8026.2011n61p073.
- Stanley, Bob (2022). Let's Do It: The Birth of Pop Music: A History. Cambridge, England: Pegasus Books. ISBN 978-1639362509.

=== News articles ===
- Alexander, Mary (18 December 2006). "Mbube: Linda's Lion sleeps at last". southafrica.info. Archived from the original on 3 March 2012.
- Aniftos, Rania (25 February 2025). "Robert John, Beloved 'Sad Eyes' Crooner, Dies at 79". Billboard. Archived from the original on 10 September 2025.
- Blair, David (30 October 2004). "Penniless singer's family sue Disney for Lion King royalties". The Telegraph. Archived from the original on 1 June 2025.
- Blistein, Jon (25 February 2025). "Robert John, Crooner Behind Number One Hit 'Sad Eyes,' Dead at 79". Rolling Stone. Archived from the original on 10 March 2025.
- Browne, David (7 November 2019). "'The Lion Sleeps Tonight': The Ongoing Saga of Pop's Most Contentious Song". Rolling Stone. Archived from the original on 27 May 2025.
- Connor, Alan (3 July 2018). "The Lion Sleeps Tonight—written by a Zulu migrant worker, made famous by Disney". Financial Times. Archived from the original on 12 February 2025.
- Chanda, Abhik Kumar (2 August 2004). "SA family to go ahead with Disney lawsuit" (PDF). Sunday Times. Archived from the original (PDF) on 8 April 2024 – via Stellenbosch University.
- Contreras, Felix (24 March 2006). "Family of 'Lion Sleeps Tonight' Writer to Get Millions". All Things Considered. NPR. Archived from the original on 23 June 2025.
- Debusmann Jr, Brend (7 February 2026). "Trump says he 'didn't see' part of video with racist clip depicting Obamas as apes". BBC News. Archived from the original on 29 March 2026.
- Eriksen, Jan (1 January 2016). "Husker du Bamses hit? Her er den vanvittige historie bag Vimmersvej" [Do you remember Bamse's hit? Here's the crazy story behind Vimmersvej]. B. T. (in Danish). Archived from the original on 10 August 2026.
- Hansen, Jeppe Lykke (1 January 2011). "Bamse hjalp tre afrikanske søstre" [Bamse helped three African sisters]. TV 2 (in Danish). Archived from the original on 19 November 2023.
- Khumalo, Fred (2 July 2004). "Wimoweh royalties start to roll" (PDF). The Toronto Star. Archived from the original (PDF) on 8 April 2024 – via Stellenbosch University.
- Lafraniere, Sharon (22 March 2006). "In the Jungle, the Unjust Jungle, a Small Victory". The New York Times. Archived from the original on 2 August 2025.
- Laing, Dave (31 December 1998). "Karl Denver obituary". The Guardian. Archived from the original on 13 December 2025.
- Leigh, Spencer (20 January 1999). "Obituary: Karl Denver". The Independent. Archived from the original on 17 January 2025.
- Lewis, Randy (14 May 2019). "Who wrote 'The Lion Sleeps Tonight'? A Netflix film seeks answers, and closure". Los Angeles Times. Archived from the original on 22 July 2025.
- Ngema, Zee (10 August 2020). "How the Creator of 'The Lion Sleeps Tonight' Finally Got His Due in 'Black Is King'". OkayAfrica. Archived from the original on 11 April 2025.
- Olmstead, Molly (6 February 2026). "Donald Trump Posted a Video of the Obamas as Apes. Its Origins Don't Make It Any Better". Slate. Archived from the original on 30 March 2026.
- Phillips, Lior (8 May 2023). "The Lion Sleeps Tonight: one song's journey from 1930s South Africa to Disney money-spinner". The Guardian. Archived from the original on 2 August 2025.
- Quinn, Melissa (7 February 2026). "White House removes Trump post with racist footage of Obamas hours after defending it". CBS News. Archived from the original on 30 March 2026.
- Robinson, Simon (25 October 2004). "It's a Lawsuit, a Mighty Lawsuit". Time. Archived from the original on 2 August 2025.
- Slotnik, Daniel E. (6 February 2015). "Anita Darian, a Singer With an Eclectic Range, Dies at 87". The New York Times. Archived from the original on 27 December 2024.
- Sørensen, Leon (14 September 2018). "Thisted har fået landets første Vimmersvej" [Thisted has the country's first Vimmersvej]. Limfjord Update (in Danish). Archived from the original on 17 September 2018.
- Staff (7 July 2004). "A Flap Over 'The Lion Sleeps Tonight'". Billboard. Archived from the original on 31 March 2026.
- Vazquez, Maegan (6 February 2026). "Trump shares, then deletes video depicting Obamas as apes". The Washington Post. Archived from the original on 30 March 2026.
- Vilhardt, Maria (13 January 2003). "Vimmersvej skal gå til Sydafrika" [Vimmersvej to go to South Africa]. Jyllands-Posten (in Danish). Archived from the original on 10 August 2026.
- Vincent, Roger (3 July 2004). "A Legal Uproar Over Song in 'Lion King'". Los Angeles Times. Archived from the original on 2 August 2025.
- Wilberforce, Mark (29 December 2020). "Seeking justice for Lion Sleeps Tonight composer". BBC News. Archived from the original on 24 July 2025.
- "Disney denies liability in lion song dispute" (PDF). Toronto Star. Reuters. 7 July 2004. Archived from the original (PDF) on 8 April 2024 – via Stellenbosch University.
- "Disney rebuffs Lion song claim". BBC News. 7 July 2004. Archived from the original on 2 August 2025.
- "Disney settles Lion song dispute". BBC News. 16 February 2006. Archived from the original on 26 January 2025.
- "Family of Wimoweh songwriter should sleep well tonight—the lion must wait" (PDF). Toronto Star. 28 September 2004. Archived from the original (PDF) on 8 April 2024 – via Stellenbosch University.
- "Family sues Disney over Lion song". BBC News. 5 July 2004. Archived from the original on 1 November 2025.
- "'Lion Sleeps Tonight' royalty row". BBC News. 18 June 2003. Archived from the original on 2 August 2025.
- "Lion song settlement nears" (PDF). The Citizen. 28 September 2004. Archived from the original (PDF) on 8 April 2024 – via Stellenbosch University.

=== Other media ===
- Breihan, Tom (19 February 2020). "The Number Ones: Robert John's 'Sad Eyes'". Stereogum. Archived from the original on 12 September 2024.
- Copsey, Rob (21 March 2021). "The Official Top 50 Best-selling Songs of 1982". Official Charts. Archived from the original on 9 October 2025.
- East Coast Breakfast (4 August 2025). "Owen Dean unpacks the legal battle with Disney behind 'The Lion Sleeps Tonight'". East Coast Radio. Archived from the original on 25 November 2025.
- Ewing, Tom (9 March 2009). "Tight Fit – "The Lion Sleeps Tonight"". Freaky Trigger.
- Library of Congress Copyright Office. (1952). Catalog of Copyright Entries: Published Music. Vol. 6. Washington, D.C.: United States Government Publishing Office.
- Nye, Eric. "Pounds Sterling to Dollars: Historical Conversion of Currency". University of Wyoming. Archived from the original on 31 March 2026.
- Rice, Jo; Rice, Tim; Gambaccini, Paul; Read, Mike (1982). The Guinness Book of 500 Number One Hits. Enfield, England: Guinness Superlatives Ltd. ISBN 0-85112-250-7.
- Webster, Ian (11 March 2026). "Inflation Calculator". CPI Inflation Calculator. Archived from the original on 31 March 2026.
- "Árslistinn 1993" [The Annual List 1993]. DV (in Icelandic). Reykjavík, Iceland. 4 January 1994 – via Timarit.is.
- "Billboard Music Week". Billboard Music Week. New York. 23 October 1961.
- "Íslenski Listinn" [The Icelandic List]. DV (in Icelandic). Reykjavík, Iceland. 1 April 1993 – via Timarit.is.
- "The Programmers: MOR Playlist". RPM Weekly. Canada. 12 February 1972. p. 20. Archived from the original on 17 April 2025 – via Library and Archives Canada.
- "Review: "Tight Fit" by Tight Fit (Vinyl, 1982)". Pop Records. 1 January 2022. Archived from the original on 25 November 2025.
- "RPM100". RPM Weekly. Canada. 10 October 1966. p. 9. Archived from the original on 20 January 2025 – via Library and Archives Canada.
- "RPM100 Singles". RPM Weekly. Canada. 11 March 1972. pp. 14–15. Archived from the original on 19 January 2025 – via Library and Archives Canada.
- "RPM100 Singles". RPM Weekly. Canada. 5 April 1986. p. 6. Archived from the original on 30 March 2026 – via Library and Archives Canada.
- "RPM 100 Top Singles of 1972". RPM Weekly. Canada. 13 January 1973.
- "Solomon Linda's Original Evening Birds Mbube / NGI Hambiki". flatinternational. Archived from the original on 18 January 2024.

=== Charts ===
- Hallberg, Eric (1993). Eric Hallberg presenterar Kvällstoppen i P3 [Eric Hallberg Presents Kvällstoppen on P3] (in Swedish) (1st ed.). Stockholm: Drift. ISBN 9-789-16-302-14-04.
- Hallberg, Eric; Henningsson, Ulf (2012). Tio i Topp - med de utslagna "på försök" 1961–74 [Tio I Topp With The Eliminated On Trial 1961–1974] (in Swedish) (2nd ed.). Stockholm: Premium. ISBN 978-91-89136-89-2.
- Kent, David (3 January 1983). "National Top 100 Singles for 1982". Kent Music Report – via Imgur.
- Kent, David (1993). Australian Chart Book 1970–1992 (illustrated ed.). St Ives, New South Wales: Australian Chart Book. ISBN 0-646-11917-6.
- Kent, David (2005). Australian Chart Book 1940–1969. Turramurra, New South Wales: Australian Chart Book. ISBN 9780646444390.
- Kohler, Steve. "Lever Hit Parades". Flavour of New Zealand. Archived from the original on 29 May 2025.
- Kohler, Steve. "Search Listener". Flavour of New Zealand. Archived from the original on 19 November 2025.
- Nyman, Jake (2005). Suomi soi 4: Suuri suomalainen listakirja (in Finnish). Helsinki: Tammi. ISBN 978-951-31-2503-5.
- Whitburn, Joel (2003). Joel Whitburn's Top Pop Singles 1955–2002. United States: Record Research. ISBN 0-89820-155-1.
- "1968 Charts Index: 13 November 1968 Singles". Go-Set. Archived from the original on 3 September 2025.
- "1972 Charts Index: 17 June 1972 Singles". Go-Set. Archived from the original on 9 December 2025.
- "Cash Box Top 100 Singles: Week ending March 29, 1952". Tropicalglen.com. Archived from the original on 17 November 2025.
- "Cash Box Top 100 Singles: Week ending December 30, 1961". Tropicalglen.com. Archived from the original on 11 February 2025.
- "Cash Box Top 100 Singles: Week ending March 18, 1972". Tropicalglen.com. Archived from the original on 25 April 2025.
- "The Cash Box Year-End Charts: 1962". Tropicalglen.com. Archived from the original on 25 January 2025.
- "The Cash Box Year-End Charts: 1972". Tropicalglen.com. Archived from the original on 24 May 2025.
- "CHUM Charts: 1961". The CHUM Tribute Site. Archived from the original on 9 April 2024.
- "[Classifiche]". Musica e dischi (in Italian). Set the "Tipo" tab on "Singoli". Then, in the "Titolo" field, type "The Lion Sleeps Tonight". Archived from the original on 24 May 2026.
- "The Cooldown Café feat. Gerard Joling - The Lion Sleeps Tonight". Dutch Charts (in Dutch). Archived from the original on 1 April 2026.
- "Daniel Küblböck – The Lion Sleeps Tonight". Austrian Charts (in German). Archived from the original on 31 March 2026.
- "Daniel Küblböck: The Lion Sleeps Tonight". Offizielle Deutsche Charts (in German). Archived from the original on 31 March 2026.
- "Daniel Küblböck – The Lion Sleeps Tonight". swiss-charts (in German). Archived from the original on 28 February 2021.
- "Displaying 4 for "Tight Fit"". The Irish Charts - All there is to know.
- "Explore BRIT Certified". BRIT Certified - The BPI. Type "The Lion Sleeps Tonight Tokens" in the Search bar. Archived from the original on 30 March 2026.
- "Gold & Platinum [Robert John, The Lion Sleeps]". RIAA. Archived from the original on 17 April 2025.
- "Gold & Platinum [The Tokens, The Lion Sleeps]". RIAA. Archived from the original on 17 April 2025.
- "Henri Salvador – Le lion est mort ce soir" [Henri Salvador – The Lion Died Tonight]. Ultratop (in French). Archived from the original on 31 March 2026.
- "Jaaroverzichten 1982" [Annual Overview 1982]. Ultratop (in Dutch). Archived from the original on 26 December 2024.
- "Jaaroverzichten – Single 1982" [Annual Overview - Single 1982]. Dutch Charts (in Dutch). Archived from the original on 25 May 2025.
- "Karl Denver – Wimoweh". Dutch Charts (in Dutch). Archived from the original on 1 April 2026.
- "Pow Wow dans les charts français" [Pow Wow in the French Charts]. Pure Charts. Archived from the original on 31 March 2026.
- "Robert John". Billboard. Archived from the original on 7 April 2022.
- "Robert John: The Lion Sleeps Tonight". Offizielle Deutsche Charts (in German). Archived from the original on 17 April 2025.
- "SA Charts 1969 - 1989: Acts J". The South African Rock Encyclopedia. Archived from the original on 6 April 2025.
- "Single Certification Search". RadioScope. Archived from the original on 25 May 2026.
- "Single Top 40 slágerlista" [Single Top 40 chart]. Hivatalos magyar slágerlisták (in Hungarian). Archived from the original on 14 December 2024.
- "The Hounds - Hitlisteplaceringar" [The Hounds - Hitlist positions] (in Danish). Danske Hitlister. Archived from the original on 14 October 2025 – via National Library of Denmark.
- "The Lion Sleeps Tonight, Robert John". Billboard Database.
- "The Lion Sleeps Tonight by Jungle Rumble". Official Charts. Archived from the original on 31 March 2026.
- "The Lion Sleeps Tonight by Tight Fit". Official Charts. Archived from the original on 11 September 2024.
- "The Lion Sleeps Tonight by Tokens". Official Charts. Archived from the original on 25 March 2025.
- "The Lion Sleeps Tonight, The Tokens". Billboard Database.
- "The Lion Sleeps Tonight (Wimoweh) by Dave Newman". Official Charts. Archived from the original on 7 December 2024.
- "Tight Fit – The Lion Sleeps Tonight". Austrian Charts (in German). Archived from the original on 17 April 2025.
- "Tight Fit: The Lion Sleeps Tonight". BRIT Certified - The BPI. Archived from the original on 22 February 2025.
- "Tight Fit – The Lion Sleeps Tonight". Dutch Charts (in Dutch).
- "Tight Fit: The Lion Sleeps Tonight". Offizielle Deutsche Charts (in German). Archived from the original on 17 April 2025.
- "Tight Fit – The Lion Sleeps Tonight". swiss-charts (in German). Archived from the original on 17 April 2025.
- "Tight Fit – The Lion Sleeps Tonight". Ultratop (in Dutch). Archived from the original on 17 April 2025.
- "Tight Fit – The Lion Sleeps Tonight (Song)". New Zealand charts portal. Archived from the original on 17 April 2025.
- "Tight Fit – The Lion Sleeps Tonight (Song)". Swedish Charts Portal. Archived from the original on 24 April 2023.
- "The Tokens: The Lion Sleeps Tonight". Offizielle Deutsche Charts (in German). Archived from the original on 17 April 2025.
- "The Tokens – The Lion Sleeps Tonight". Ultratop (in Dutch). Archived from the original on 8 August 2025.
- "The Tokens – The Lion Sleeps Tonight". Ultratop (in French). Archived from the original on 30 November 2024.
- "Top 40-lijst van week 17, 1982" [Top 40 List of Week 17, 1982]. Top 40 (in Dutch). Archived from the original on 25 December 2024.
- "Top 100 Hits of 1972/Top 100 Songs of 1972". Music Outfitters. Archived from the original on 3 July 2025.
- "Top 100-Jaaroverzicht van 1982" [Top 100 Annual Overview of 1982]. Top 40 (in Dutch). Archived from the original on 19 January 2025.
- "Top 100 Single-Jahrescharts" [Top 100 Singles Annual Charts]. Offizielle Deutsche Charts (in German). Archived from the original on 28 June 2025.
- "Vimmersvej – Bamses Venner" (in Danish). Danske Hitlister. Archived from the original on 19 January 2026.
- "Wimoweh by Karl Denver". Official Charts. Archived from the original on 12 February 2025.
