= Lion's share (disambiguation) =

The Lion's Share may refer to:

- Lion's share, idiomatic expression derived from fable by Aesop

== Film and TV ==
- The Lion's Share (1971 film), 1971 French-Italian crime thriller
- ReMastered: The Lion's Share, 2019 American documentary film
- "The Lion's Share" (The Price Is Right), a pricing game

== Music ==
- Lion Share Studios, American recording studio founded in 1981
- Lion's Share (band), Swedish heavy metal founded in 1987
- "The Lion's Share", a song by 10,000 Maniacs from their 1989 album Blind Man's Zoo
