= Ruby & the Romantics =

American R&B vocal group (1961-1971)

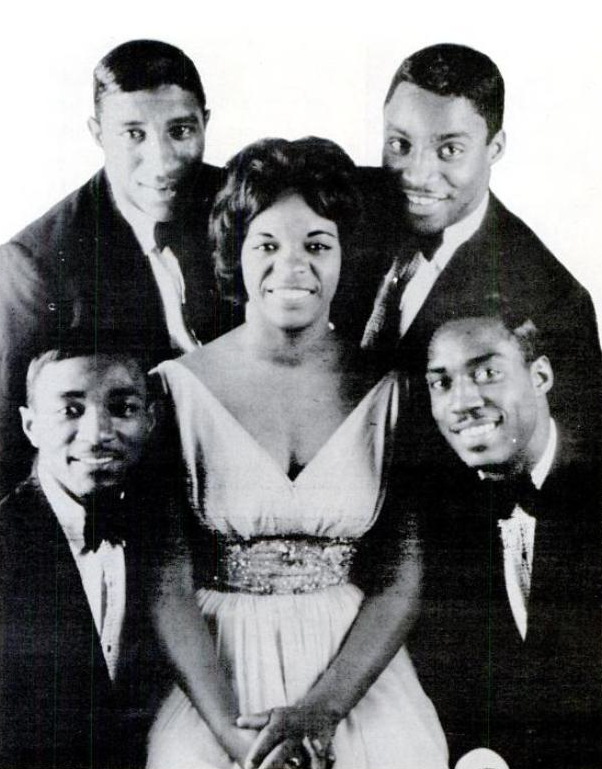
Ruby & the Romantics in 1965. Clockwise from bottom left: George Lee, Ronald Mosely, Ruby Nash, Leroy Fann, Ed Roberts.

Ruby & the Romantics was an Akron, Ohio-based American R&B group in the 1960s, composed of Ruby Nash, George Lee, Ronald Mosely, Leroy Fann, and Ed Roberts.

The group had several pop and R&B hit records, topping the US Billboard Hot 100 chart in 1963 with their first recording, "Our Day Will Come". The song, written by Mort Garson and Bob Hilliard, was a worldwide hit, reaching No. 1 and selling over one million copies in the US, also topped the Billboard R&B chart at No. 1, and peaked at No. 38 in the UK Singles Chart. It also reached No. 11 on the Australian Charts.

Despite their relative obscurity compared to many of their 1960s contemporaries, Ruby and The Romantics reign as one of the most-covered and influential R&B vocal groups of the 1960s. They were inducted into the Vocal Group Hall of Fame in 2007, and are winners of the Rhythm and Blues Foundation's prestigious Pioneer Award. In 1963, they were also nominated by The National Academy of Recording Arts and Sciences for the Best Rock and Roll Recording for "Our Day Will Come". In 2013, Ruby & The Romantics became charter inductees into the inaugural class of the National Rhythm & Blues Hall of Fame in Cleveland, Ohio.

== History ==
Ruby Nash, the female lead of the group, originally sang with a group consisting of her sister and three friends. They sang at record hops, mixers, talent shows and clubs in Akron and surrounding areas. Ruby attended Central High School in Akron. No one knew she could sing until after she graduated from high school. Some of the male members of the Romantics sang with The Embers. Eventually, The Embers became known as The Supremes (not to be confused with The Supremes of Motown Records), and then The Feilos.

Since they all grew up in Akron and knew each other, Leroy Fann, a member of The Feilos, (pronounced FAY-LOWS) asked Ruby to sing with them on occasions. After auditioning, the group was signed to New York-based Kapp Records; Kapp Records artist and repertoire chief Allen Stanton changed their name to "Ruby & the Romantics". "Our Day Will Come" was originally intended for another artist on the label, crooner Jack Jones, but the group saw its potential and persuaded Stanton to let them record it. Their song became a smash, reaching number one on the Billboard Hot 100, as well as reaching the top of the Billboard R&B Chart.

By the year 1963, the group's next release, "My Summer Love", reached The Top 20, charting at No. 16 on the Hot 100 and a third release, the original version of "Hey There Lonely Boy" climbed to No. 27. Several more singles were released by Kapp which generally achieved minor chart status. A short spell with ABC resulting in three singles and an album was unsuccessful. A single for A&M in 1969, "Hurting Each Other", saw them re-united with Allen Stanton. Originally recorded by Jimmy Clanton some years earlier, it proved to be their final recording before the group broke up in 1971.

=== Cover versions and influence ===
Ruby & The Romantics were known throughout the music industry for their smooth, rich, full-range harmonies-from high tenor, to deep, abyssal bass. In a 2011 interview with Ruby, Tom Meros of Rock and Roll Universe revealed that, according to Damon Harris, David Ruffin, and Eddie Kendricks of The Temptations, the background harmonies of Ruby & The Romantics on "Our Day Will Come", actually served as the original model for The Temptations' background harmonies in 1963. In this, The Romantics proved very influential. The group was also very influential on the music of The Carpenters, who recorded three of their tunes, and Donny and Marie Osmond, who also covered several of their songs.

Several of the songs they recorded went on to become hits or important recordings for other artists, such as "Hey There Lonely Boy" (which was covered by Eddie Holman as "Hey There Lonely Girl" and peaked in the US at No. 2 in February 1970). It was also covered by Martha & The Vandellas, Stacy Lattisaw, Donny Osmond, Will Downing, The Softones, Shaun Cassidy, Barry Biggs, and Robert John. "Hurting Each Other" recorded for A&M in 1969 which became a No. 2 hit for The Carpenters three years later; The Carpenters also covered their song "Your Baby Doesn't Love You Anymore", which reached No. 12 on the Adult Contemporary Chart, and also their hit "Our Day Will Come". The group's hit "Young Wings Can Fly" has been covered by Titus Turner, The Essex, Johnny & The Attractions, Tähti Kaukainen, and a cappella group Windsong. The Romantics' hit, "When You're Young and in Love" was covered by the Motown group The Marvelettes which peaked at No. 23 in the US in May 1967. It was also covered by Ralph Carter (of the TV series Good Times), and The Choice Four, both of whom reached the Pop & R&B Charts with their versions in the autumn of 1975. Stacy Lattisaw also covered the song in 1979. The song has also been recorded by Donny & Marie – as "(When You're) Young and in Love" – and the Jets. British a cappella band The Flying Pickets also took the song to No. 7 in the UK Singles Chart in 1984). Additionally, "Our Day Will Come" has had over 60 recorded cover versions by other artists, including Frankie Valli (whose version peaked at No. 11 in the US in the fall of 1975), Cher, Donny & Marie, Bobby Darin, Patti Page, Dee Dee Sharp, Pat Boone, Amy Winehouse, Nancy Wilson, Trini Lopez, The Supremes, Cliff Richard, James Brown, The Slackers and numerous others. The Searchers covered their song "Does He [She] Really Care for Me".

The "Romantics" were:

- Ruby Nash (lead singer)
- Ed Roberts (second tenor) – died of cancer on August 15, 1993.
- George Lee (first tenor) – died of cancer in 1994.
- Ronald Mosely (baritone) – died on December 3, 2011, at age 72.
- Leroy Fann (bass) – died of an apparent heart attack in New York in November 1973.

Ruby & The Romantics had remained intact, with all five original members, throughout their entire 10-year recording career, (1961–1971), as confirmed by Ruby in an interview in 2008 with Marv Goldberg (R&B Notebooks). She returned to the Akron, Ohio area after the break-up and remained there as of 2012. As of 2026, Ruby is the only surviving original member of the Romantics. Neither she nor any of the descendants of The Romantics receive any royalties for the group's hit records.

In August 2013, Ruby & The Romantics became charter inductees into the new Rhythm and Blues Music Hall of Fame in Cleveland, Ohio.

== Awards ==
- In 1964, Ruby & The Romantics received a Grammy Award nomination for Best Rock and Roll Recording for their No. 1 hit, "Our Day Will Come".
- In 1997, Ruby & The Romantics received The Rhythm & Blues Foundation's Pioneer Award.
- In 2007, Ruby & The Romantics were inducted into The Vocal Group Hall of Fame.
- In 2013, Ruby & The Romantics were honored by their hometown of Akron, Ohio, for their accomplishments and international impact.
- In August 2013, Ruby & The Romantics were inductees into the first class of the Rhythm and Blues Music Hall of Fame.

== Discography ==
=== Albums ===
- 1963 Till Then – Kapp KS3341
- 1963 Our Day Will Come
- 1966 Greatest Hits – Kapp KS3458 (stereo), 1980 MCA 541
- 1967 Ruby & the Romantics – Kapp KS3526
- 1968 More Than Yesterday – ABC ABCS638
- 1991 The Very Best of Ruby & the Romantics – Taragon TARCD-1000

=== Singles ===
Year	Titles (A-side, B-side) Both sides from same album except where indicated	Chart positions				Album
Year	Titles (A-side, B-side) Both sides from same album except where indicated	US	US AC	US R&B	UK	Album
1963	"Our Day Will Come"^{C} b/w "Moonlight and Music"	1	—	1	38	Our Day Will Come
1963	"My Summer Love"^{D} b/w "Sweet Love and Sweet Forgiveness" (from Ruby and the Romantics)	16	6	—	—	Greatest Hits Album
1963	"Hey There Lonely Boy" b/w "Not a Moment Too Soon" (from Ruby and the Romantics)	27	5	—	—	Greatest Hits Album
1963	"Young Wings Can Fly" b/w "Day Dreaming" (from Our Day Will Come)	47	15	14	—	Till Then
1964	"Our Everlasting Love" b/w "Much Better Off Than I've Ever Been" (from Ruby and the Romantics)	64	14	12	—	Greatest Hits Album
1964	"Baby Come Home" b/w "Every Day's A Holiday" (from Ruby and the Romantics)	75	—	28	—	Greatest Hits Album
1964	"When You're Young and in Love"^{A} b/w "I Cry Alone" (from Ruby and the Romantics)	48	15	—	—	Greatest Hits Album
1965	"Does He Really Care for Me" b/w "Nevertheless (I'm in Love with You)" (from Ruby and the Romantics)	87	—	—	—	Greatest Hits Album
1965	"Your Baby Doesn't Love You Anymore"^{B} b/w "We'll Meet Again"	108	—	—	—	Greatest Hits Album
1965	"Nobody But My Baby" b/w "Imagination" (from Till Then)	—	—	—	—	Greatest Hits Album
1966	"We Can Make It" b/w "Remember Me"	120	—	—	—	Ruby and the Romantics
1967	"Twilight Time" b/w "Una Bella Brazilian Melody" (from More Than Yesterday)	—	—	—	—	Non-album track
1967	"This Is No Laughing Matter" b/w "Only Heaven Knows" (Non-album track)	—	—	—	—	More Than Yesterday
1967	"We'll Love Again" b/w "I Know"	—	—	—	—	Ruby and the Romantics
1968	"On a Clear Day You Can See Forever" b/w "More Than Yesterday Less Than Tomorrow"	—	—	—	—	More Than Yesterday
1969	"Hurting Each Other" b/w "Baby I Could Be So Good at Lovin' You"	113	—	—	—	Non-album tracks
"—" denotes releases that did not chart or were not released in that territory.

- ^{A}"When You're Young And in Love" also peaked at No. 25 on RPM Top Tracks.
- ^{B}"Your Baby Doesn't Love You Anymore"-Charting "B" side to non-charting "A" side, "We'll Meet Again" (Kapp K-665).
- ^{C}"Our Day Will Come" also peaked at No. 16 on CHUM Hit Parade.
- ^{D}"My Summer Love" also peaked at No. 24 on CHUM Hit Parade.
