= Your Baby Doesn't Love You Anymore =

1965 song by Ruby & the Romantics

Single by Carpenters

from the album Voice of the Heart
- B-side: "Sailing on the Tide"
- Released: 1984
- Recorded: 1982
- Genre: Pop
- Length: 3:52
- Label: A&M; 1940
- Songwriters: Larry Weiss ("Your Baby Doesn't Love You Anymore"); Tony Peluso; Lyrics: John Bettis ("Sailing on the Tide")
- Producer: Richard Carpenter

Carpenters singles chronology
"Make Believe It's Your First Time" (1983)	"Your Baby Doesn't Love You Anymore" (1984)	"Now" (1984)

"Your Baby Doesn't Love You Anymore" is a song originally recorded and made a minor hit by Ruby & the Romantics in 1965. It appeared on their Greatest Hits album, and was released as a single on Kapp Records K-665 in April of that year. On The Romantics' original version, the song's composer is listed as Lawrence (Larry) Weiss. Although it was originally a B-side to the standard "We'll Meet Again", "Your Baby" received considerably more R&B radio airplay, but did not reach the Billboard Hot 100, only managing #8 on the Bubbling Under chart.

== Carpenters' version ==
Eighteen years later, in 1983, The Carpenters released a cover version of the song as the second single from their 1983 Voice of the Heart album. The single was the second posthumous release after Karen's death. No video was shot for the song nor has the song ever been performed live by Richard.

== Personnel ==
- Karen Carpenter – lead vocals
- Richard Carpenter – backing vocals, keyboards
- Joe Osborn – bass guitar
- Ron Tutt – drums
- Tony Peluso – guitar
- Chuck Findley – trumpet
- Peter Limonick – percussion
- Earle Dumler – oboe

== Charts ==
The Carpenters

Chart (1984)	Peak position
Canada RPM Adult Contemporary	21
US Adult Contemporary (Billboard)	12

== Ruby & The Romantics' original version ==
"Your Baby Doesn't Love You Anymore"

Single by Ruby & the Romantics

from the album Greatest Hits
- A-side: "We'll Meet Again"
- Released: 1965
- Recorded: 1965
- Genre: Pop/R&B
- Label: Kapp Records; K665
- Songwriter: Larry Weiss ("Your Baby Doesn't Love You Anymore")
- Producer: Tom Catalano

Ruby & the Romantics singles chronology
"Does He Really Care for Me" (1965)	"Your Baby Doesn't Love You Anymore" (1965)	"We Can Make It" (1966)

=== Personnel ===
Ruby & the Romantics

- Lead vocals by Ruby Nash
- Backing vocals by Leroy Fann, Ed Roberts, Ronald Mosely, and George Lee
- Song written and composed by Lawrence Weiss
- Orchestra arranged and conducted by Alan Lorber
- Produced by Tom Catalano
