= Back on the Streets =

Back on the Streets may refer to:

Music

- Back on the Streets (Gary Moore album), a 1978 album by British rock artist Gary Moore
- Back on the Streets (Tower of Power album), a 1979 album by funk/soul group Tower of Power
- Back on the Streets (Donnie Iris album), the 1980 debut album of American rock artist Donnie Iris
- "Back on the Streets" (song), a 1976 song by British rock group Hawkwind
- "Back on the Streets", a song from the self-titled debut album Vinnie Vincent Invasion
  - "Back on the Streets", cover of the Vinnie Vincent Invasion song by John Norum from the album Total Control
- "Back on the Streets", a song from the 1985 album Innocence Is No Excuse by Saxon

Other

- Driver 2: Back on the Streets, title of Driver 2 video game release in Europe

== See also ==
- Back in the Streets, album by Dokken
- Back on the Street, album by Robert John
- Back to the Street, album by Petra
