= Pomeroy, South Africa =

Pomeroy
- Solomon Linda
- Location within KwaZulu-Natal Location within South Africa
- Coordinates: 28°33′52″S 30°26′19″E
- Country: South Africa
- Province: KwaZulu-Natal
- District: Umzinyathi
- Municipality: Msinga

Area
  - Total: 5.97 km^{2} (2.31 sq mi)

Population (2011)
  - Total: 1,621
  - Density: 272/km^{2} (703/sq mi)

Racial makeup (2011)
  - Black African: 91.5%
  - Coloured: 2.3%
  - Indian/Asian: 4.3%
  - White: 0.4%
  - Other: 1.5%

First languages (2011)
  - Zulu: 89.7%
  - English: 6.9%
  - Other: 3.3%
- Time zone: UTC+2 (SAST)
- Postal code (street): 3020
- PO box: 3020
- Area code: 034

Pomeroy (renamed Solomon Linda in 2022) is a small town on the R33 road in KwaZulu-Natal, South Africa, some 72 kilometers north of Greytown and 56 kilometers south-south-east of Dundee. The town was named for Sir George Pomeroy Colley, who led the British force during the Battle of Majuba Hill in 1881.

The town was established initially as the Gordon Memorial Mission in 1867 in memory of James Henry Hamilton-Gordon, the son of George Hamilton-Gordon, 5th Earl of Aberdeen. The mission worked with the Zulus.

In 2022, the South African Geographical Names Council decided to rename the town in honour of Solomon Linda, a musical artist who was born in the town.
