= Sea Point Days =

- Directed by: François Verster
- Produced by: Producer Luna Films
- Cinematography: François Verster, Peter Lichti
- Edited by: François Verster
- Music by: Peter Coyte
- Release date: September 6, 2008 (Toronto International Film Festival)
- Running time: 96 minutes
- Country: South Africa

Sea Point Days is a 2008 documentary film about the Cape Town suburb of Sea Point, directed by François Verster.

== Synopsis ==
Alongside the southernmost urban centre in Africa, separating city from ocean, lays a very special strip of land. Set against the beautiful backdrop of the Atlantic Ocean on one side and Signal Hill on the other, the Sea Point Promenade and the public swimming pools in its centre forms a space unlike any in Cape Town. Once a bastion of Apartheid exclusivity, it is now unique in its apparently easy mix of age, race, gender, religion, wealth status, and sexual orientation. Somehow, this space has become one in which all South Africans feel they have a right to exist, and the possibility of happiness in a divided world seems feasible. But what is the reality of those coming here? How do people see their past, their present in this space and their future in this country?

The film had its world premiere at the Toronto International Film Festival.
