= Rian Malan =

South African author, journalist, and songwriter of Afrikaner descent

- Born: Johannesburg, South Africa
- Occupations: Author, journalist, documentarist, musician, songwriter
- Writing career
- Genres: Memoirs, investigative journalism
- Notable works: My Traitor's Heart, In the Jungle

Rian Malan is a South African author, journalist, documentarist and songwriter of Afrikaner descent. He first rose to prominence as the author of the memoir My Traitor's Heart (1990), which, like the bulk of his work, deals with South African society in a historical and contemporary perspective and focuses on racial relations. As a journalist, he has written for major newspapers in South Africa, Britain and the United States.

== Personal background ==
Malan grew up in a middle-class and pro-apartheid Afrikaner family in a white suburb of Johannesburg. He attended Blairgowrie Primary School in Randburg where one of his contemporaries was the columnist, Jani Allan. He then attended Woodmead School, South Africa's first non-racially based high school. He has described how, as a teenager, he formed a rock band that associated with black artists and wanted to rebel against the apartheid system, at a time when he in fact had virtually no interaction with black people. He attended the then Witwatersrand University for a year. To avoid conscription, which was compulsory for all white males, he moved to Los Angeles in 1977 and worked as a journalist.

== As a memoirist: My Traitor's Heart ==
Returning to South Africa in the 1980s, he wrote My Traitor's Heart, his memoir of growing up in Apartheid-era South Africa in which he explores race relations through prominent murder cases. In addition, he reflects on the history of his family, a prominent Afrikaner clan that migrated to the Cape in the 17th century and included Daniel François Malan, the South African Prime Minister who was a principal ideological force behind Apartheid doctrine. The book, which became a best-seller, was translated into 11 languages.

== Journalism ==
Malan began his journalistic career in 1975, as a reporter for The Star. During his stay in the US, he served as managing editor for Music Connection (1978), as news editor for LA Weekly (1979), as staff writer for New West Magazine (California) (1981), as senior writer for Los Angeles Herald-Examiner (1984) and as senior editor for Manhattan Inc. magazine (1984). Since then, he has been a freelance writer for various magazines, mainly in the US (e.g. Esquire, Rolling Stone, The Wall Street Journal), Britain (e.g. The Spectator and The Sunday Times) and South Africa (e.g. The Star, Time and Noseweek). A number of his essays are collected in the volume The Lion Sleeps Tonight and other stories of South Africa (New York: Grove Press, 2012), ISBN 9780802119902.

=== The Lion Sleeps Tonight ===
In 2000, he wrote a widely disseminated piece in Rolling Stone about the origin of the song "The Lion Sleeps Tonight", tracing its history from its first recording by Solomon Linda, a penniless Zulu singer, through its adoption by The Weavers, The Tokens and many of the folksingers of the 1960s, and its appropriation by The Walt Disney Company in the movie The Lion King. Malan reveals that Linda never received any royalties for the song; however, an ensuing court case established that 25 percent of the song's past and future royalties should go to Linda's three daughters.

=== AIDS controversy ===
Malan has generated controversy by repeatedly questioning the seriousness and scope of AIDS in Africa. In articles in Rolling Stone, The Spectator and Noseweek, a controversial South African monthly, he proposed that AIDS statistics are greatly exaggerated by researchers and health professionals who are trying to obtain more funding. His hypothesis was roundly criticised by national and international AIDS organisations, and Malan was accused of endangering lives in Africa. In an interview in the Afrikaans magazine, Insig, Malan said, 'I get a kick out of it when the Treatment Action Campaign attacks me; it's like sport.' In 2007, he said, 'In truth, I never claimed that Aids was not a problem – on the contrary, I described it as a terrible affliction that was claiming countless lives. At the same time however, it was clear that Aids numbers were being exaggerated and good news suppressed. I stand by that story.'

== As a television documentarist ==
In 1990, Malan appeared as the presenter of an episode of BBC Television's Omnibus, titled Tales of Ordinary Murder: Rian Malan in South Africa.

In 1994, he appeared as the presenter of BBC Television's travel documentary, Great Railway Journeys (series 2, episode 2). The episode was titled Cape Town to the Lost City.

In 2004, he appeared in an episode of Channel 4's Without Walls, titled The Last Afrikaner. A Search with Rian Malan, written by Malan and directed by Don Boyd.

In 2005, his struggle for justice for the heirs of Solomon Linda (see above) was documented in A Lion's Trail, directed by François Verster.

In 2009, Malan, together with Lloyd Ross, produced the documentary The Splintering Rainbow for Al Jazeera. The film documents a journey through South Africa, investigating unfolding political dramas and taking the pulse of the Rainbow Nation.

== Musical career ==
Alien Inboorling

Studio album by Rian Malan
- Released: 2005-10-28
- Genres: Afrikaans, folk, world, country
- Length: 58:05
- Language: Afrikaans
- Label: Shifty Music/Sony BMG
- Producer: Lloyd Ross

He has released a CD of his own songs, titled Alien Inboorling. The title translates as "Alien native"; the songs were described by one journalist as "parables of contemporary South Africa told in the voices of Afrikaners who have stayed and those who have left. The songs are dusty, weary, a stream of consciousness for the Afrikaans 'tribe'."
The CD was listed as number 23 on Afrikaans newspaper Beeld's list of 'Albums van die dekade'.

He also performs with Hot Club d'Afrique, a gypsy jazz band.

Malan contributed lyrics to Stoomradio and Opgestook, the first two albums by Afrikaans roots music/boeremusiek band Radio Kalahari Orkes and appears on guitar on their second CD, Die Nagloper He also contributed lyrics to Say Africa by Vusi Mahlasela.
