= A Lion's Trail =

2002 documentary film

- Directed by: François Verster
- Release date: 2002
- Running time: 52 minutes
- Country: South Africa
- Languages: Afrikaans; English; Zulu

A Lion's Trail is a 2002 documentary film by François Verster about the rights for the popular song "The Lion Sleeps Tonight", also known as "Wimoweh", "Wimba Way" or "Awimbawe", a song written and recorded by the South African shepherd and singer of Zulu origin Solomon Linda with the Evening Birds as "Mbube".

In the 1950s, the song had been adapted by Pete Seeger of The Weavers as "Wimoweh" and further developed in the 1961 version recorded by popular music group The Tokens, for whom it was re-written extensively by George David Weiss. This version had been retitled "The Lion Sleeps Tonight". The song was also adapted for the screen in The Walt Disney Company 1994 film The Lion King. The film helped Linda's family to sue legally for revenues from the song.

A Lion's Trail was not the first time Verster had tackled the controversy on the song. In 1999, he had filmed The Story of "Mbube" for television about the song. That film had won the 1999 National Television & Video Association Silver Stone & Stone Craft Award.

In 2000, South African journalist Rian Malan wrote a feature article for Rolling Stone magazine in which he recounted Solomon Linda's story tracing its history from its first recording by Solomon Linda, a penniless Zulu singer, through the song's adoption by The Weavers, The Tokens and in the movie The Lion King.

The Story of "Mbubé" and the new interest created by the Rolling Stone piece prompted Verster to create his 2002 documentary that told Linda's story, also exposing the workings of the multimillion-dollar corporate music publishing industry about copyright. The film tracks the story of the song "Wimoweh/The Lion Sleeps Tonight" back to its Zulu origin and follows the song's rocky history from South Africa to Brooklyn and back asking why Linda died penniless and his children live in poverty while American artists made millions off the song.

In 2005, it gained prominence when it was screened by PBS on the program Independent Lens receiving the award for "most outstanding cultural and artistic programming".

The publicity also helped Linda's family to find the support to take Disney, which used the song in the movie The Lion King, to court. In February 2006, Abilene Music, which holds the copyright for "Wimoweh/The Lion Sleeps Tonight", settled the case with the Solomon Linda family out of court for an undisclosed sum.

== See also ==
- ReMastered: The Lion's Share, a 2019 film on the same topic
