= Ruby Nash Garnett =

American singer (born 1934)

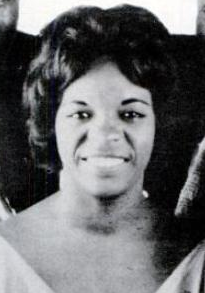
Nash Garnett in 1965

Ruby Nash Garnett (born June 15, 1934) is an American singer who led the rhythm and blues group Ruby & the Romantics.

== Life and career ==
Born in Akron, Ohio, Nash did not start singing until she was a senior in high school. She joined a group of male singers touring as "The Supremes" in 1961. After they got a recording contract with Kapp Records, they changed their name to "Ruby & the Romantics". In 1963, they scored a No. 1 hit with "Our Day Will Come", and had a Top 20 Hit with, "My Summer Love" (#16) and still another hit with "Hey There Lonely Boy" (#27), along with several more charting songs over the next several years, but they never emulated that initial success. The group disbanded in 1971, after 10 years, still with all five original members: Nash, Leroy Fann, Ed Roberts, George Lee and Ron Mosely.

Nash returned to Akron and worked for AT&T. Ruby & The Romantics were given a Pioneer Award by the Rhythm and Blues Foundation in 1997, and were inducted into the Vocal Group Hall of Fame in 2007.

As of 2026, Nash is the only surviving original member.
