= Solomon Linda =

South African musician and performer (1909–1962)

Solomon Linda OIG
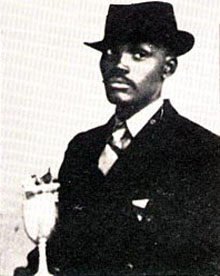
- Linda c. 1941
- Born: 1909; Pomeroy, Colony of Natal
- Died: 8 September 1962 (aged 52–53); Johannesburg, Transvaal, South Africa
- Education: Gordon Memorial School
- Spouse: Regina Madiba (m. 1949)
- Children: 8
- Musical career
- Genres: Isicathamiya
- Instruments: Vocals
- Years active: c. 1931–1959
- Label: Gallo Record Company
- Formerly of: The Evening Birds

Solomon Popoli Linda (1909 – 8 September 1962), also known as Solomon Ntsele, (Note: Linda was his clan name.) was a South African musician, singer, and performer. He composed "Mbube", a defining South African song that revamped the isicathamiya genre and spawned a distinct genre of choral music. "Mbube" would evolve into "The Lion Sleeps Tonight" when it was reimagined by the Tokens in 1961.

== Life ==
=== Early life and career (1909–1939) ===
Solomon Popoli Linda was born near Pomeroy, on the labor reserve Msinga, Umzinyathi District Municipality in Ladysmith in Natal, where he was familiar with the traditions of amahubo and izingoma zomshado (wedding songs) music. He attended the Gordon Memorial mission school, where he learned about Western musical culture, hymns, and participated in choir contests.

In 1931, Linda, like many other young African men at that time, left his homestead to find menial work in Johannesburg, by then a sprawling gold-mining town with a great demand for cheap labour. He worked in the Mayi Mayi Furniture Shop on Small Street and sang in a choir known as the Evening Birds, managed by his uncles, Solomon and Amon Madondo, and which disbanded in 1933.

Linda found employment at Johannesburg's Carlton Hotel and started a new group that retained the Evening Birds name. The members of the group were Solomon Linda (soprano), Gilbert Madondo (alto), Boy Sibiya (tenor), with Gideon Mkhize, Samuel Mlangeni, and Owen Sikhakhane as basses. They were all Linda's friends from Pomeroy.

The group evolved from performances at weddings to choir competitions. Linda's musical popularity grew with the Evening Birds, who presented "a very cool urban act that wears pinstriped suits, bowler hats and dandy two-tone shoes".

=== "Mbube" ===
After Linda started working at the Gallo Record Company's Roodepoort plant as a record packer in 1939, the Evening Birds were noticed by company talent scout Griffith Motsieloa.

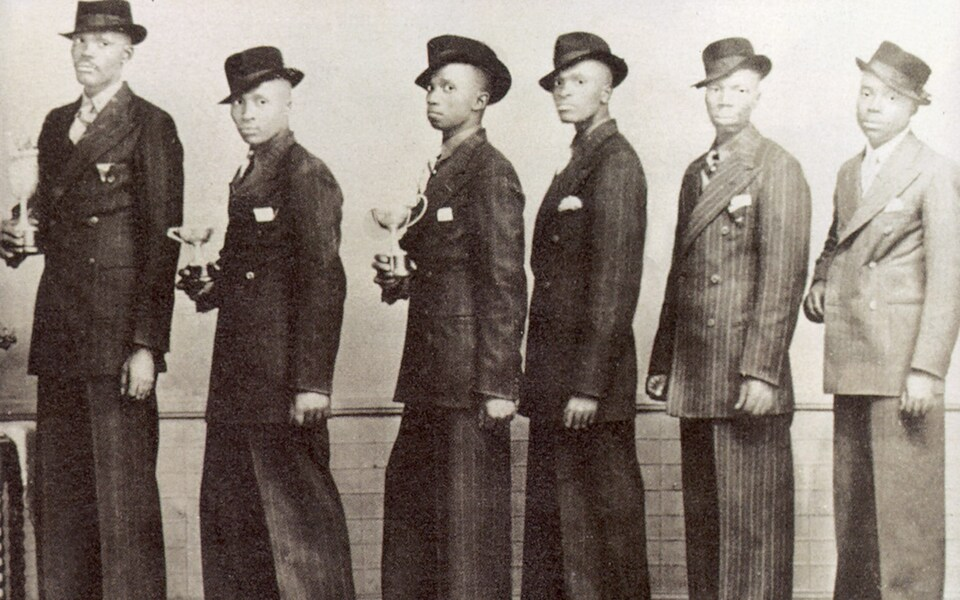
Linda's group the Evening Birds, pictured around 1941

Italian immigrant Eric Gallo owned what at that time was sub-Saharan Africa's only recording studio. In 1939, while recording a number of songs in the studio, Linda improvised the song "Mbube". (Note: "Mbube" is Zulu for "lion", or "the lion".) "Mbube" was a major success for Linda and the Evening Birds, reportedly selling more than 100,000 copies in South Africa over nine years. While the song proved a monumental success, Linda did not profit, as he sold his rights to "Mbube" to Eric Gallo for ten shillings (Note: Ten shillings in 1939 is worth $70 in 2025 (a shilling then being a twentieth of a pound, and a pound being worth $140.97 in 2025, the latter value was halved and rounded down).) just after the recording session. Seeing that Linda could not read and had no understanding of royalties, a court would later deem this deal unfair. Gallo also paid Linda the equivalent of $2 for the first run of a few hundred records.

=== Later years: 1948–1962 ===
In 1948, the Evening Birds disbanded, and a year later Linda married Regina Madiba. While raising a family he continued to perform. His song "Mbube" had made him well known in South Africa.

In 1959, Linda collapsed onstage, which doctors ruled a result of kidney failure. He died three years later aged 53. At the time of his death, his bank account contained roughly $40 in today's money. (Note: Different figures are suggested. Sharon Lafraniere writes that Linda died with $22 in his account, worth $35.08 in 2025, but Simon Robinson denotes $25, worth $42.54.) His family could not afford a tombstone.

== Musical analysis and impact ==
"Mbube" (1939)
A brief clip of "Mbube", performed by Linda and the Evening Birds

Linda is credited with a number of musical innovations that came to dominate the isicathamiya genre. Instead of using one singer per voice part, the Evening Birds used a number of bass singers. He introduced the falsetto main voice, which incorporated female vocal texture into male singing. His group was the first known to use striped suits to indicate that they were urban sophisticates. At the same time, their bass singing retained some musical elements indicative of traditional choral music.

The journalist Rian Malan comments on his music: "He has songs about work, songs about crime, songs about how banks rob you by giving you paper in exchange for real money, songs about how rudely the whites treat you when you go to get your pass stamped." Linda's song "Yetulisigqoko" ("Take off your hat") is interpreted by Erlmann as a protest song against the British regime of class and racial oppression; the song recalls treatment by Pass Office officials and ends with the words "Sikhalela izwe lakithi" ("We mourn for our country"). Such expressions were an occasional feature of mbube songs.

== Legacy ==
=== "Wimoweh" and "The Lion Sleeps Tonight" ===
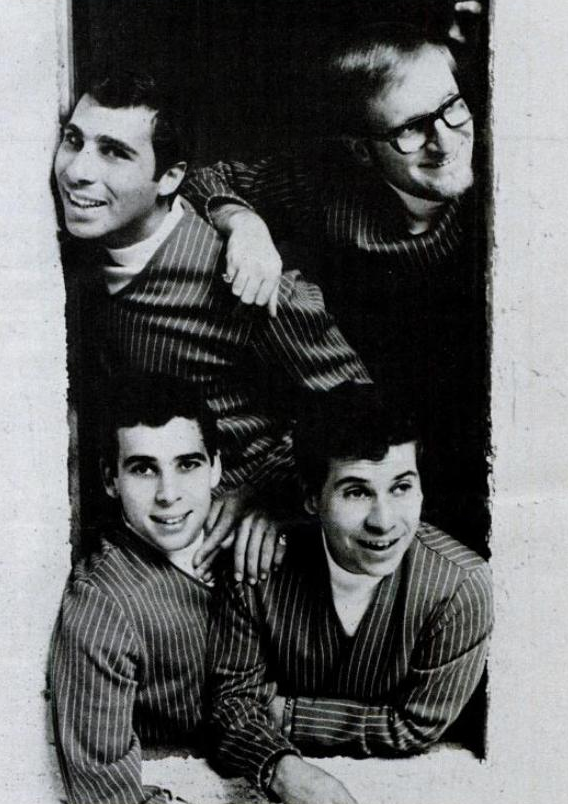
The Tokens, who adapted the Weavers' cover of "Mbube" into "The Lion Sleeps Tonight", pictured in 1967

Years after "Mbube" found success in South Africa, Gallo sent some records to Decca Records in the United States, included in which was "Mbube". Alan Lomax found them and sent them to the folk singer Pete Seeger of the Weavers. "Mbube" intrigued Seeger, and he transcribed it word for word, although he misheard the chorus as wimoweh. In December 1951, the Weavers released a cover of "Mbube" named "Wimoweh", which, as Malan writes, "was faithful to the Zulu original in almost all respects save for the finger-popping rhythm." Linda received no credit. Some years later, the Tokens, a New York-based doo-wop group, decided to record their own version. They solicited the help of George David Weiss, who gave the song English lyrics and a modern feel, making the final improvised notes ("a haunting skein of fifteen notes") the new tune. It was released in October 1961 as a B-side, and Linda, again, received no credit.

"The Lion Sleeps Tonight" surged to No. 1 in the US charts and in numerous other countries. Many covers of the song found similar success in the years to come. In 1994, it featured in the Disney film The Lion King. The film would gross nearly $1 billion and produce many soundtrack CDs. By the mid-2000s, "The Lion Sleeps Tonight" had been recorded by over 150 artists worldwide and had a role in more than thirteen movies.

=== Rediscovery ===
In spite of the song's immense fame, Linda's family had earned very little in royalties, and Linda himself had been all but forgotten. At the turn of the century, Linda's family was still desperately poor, living in "a tiny township house of three rooms, an outside toilet, and an asbestos roof without a ceiling." Five of his eight children had died. Due to this, in 2000, the South African journalist Rian Malan penned an essay for Rolling Stone which shed light on the origins of "The Lion Sleeps Tonight". He told the story of "Mbube", its eventual rise to success, and the struggles faced by Linda's daughters, and concluded that "The Lion Sleeps Tonight" had earned some $15 million in royalties. Two years later, fellow South African François Verster composed a documentary about Linda and "Mbube", A Lion's Trail. Both Malan's essay and Verster's documentary greatly publicised Linda's history.

The history of "The Lion Sleeps Tonight" and the plight of Linda's daughters have been chronicled. Beyond Malan's essay and Vester's documentary, they were covered in the 2019 Netflix film ReMastered: The Lion's Share. Moreover, Beyoncé's 2020 musical film Black Is King partially came into being after she learned of how Linda was not recognised for his contributions to "The Lion Sleeps Tonight". In the film, the original "Mbube" rather than the Tokens' version is used. In 2022, Linda's hometown Pomeroy was renamed to Solomon Linda.

=== Legal turmoil ===
Covers of "Mbube" have been plagued by disputes over songwriting credits and royalties since the 1950s. In fact, the journalists Simon Robinson and David Browne deem the song one of the most contentious in pop music. Around 1951, Pete Seeger began demanding Linda receive his fair share of revenue from "Wimoweh", but it was only until two decades later that The Richmond Organization (TRO), which owned the rights to "Mbube", conceded some of the earnings to Linda's family. They also recognized the Weavers' cover as being based on "Mbube". After the Tokens' cover became a global hit, TRO and George David Weiss' team locked horns in court. Weiss' team would retain rights over "The Lion Sleeps Tonight", but they were ordered to send ten percent of performance royalties to Linda's family. (Note: Performance royalties are profits made whenever the song is broadcast.)

In 2004, Linda's descendants sued Disney for $1.5 million for its use of "The Lion Sleeps Tonight" in The Lion King. (Note: $1.5 million in 2004 are worth $2.57 million in 2025.) (Note: BBC News gives the figure at $1.6 million, instead, equating to $2.74 million in 2025.) Their lawyer Owen Dean argued that, from 1991 to 2000, they received some $15,000 in royalties, while the song earned an estimated total of $15 million. The case attracted global attention. Before a trial could take place, however, the case was settled. Abilene Music, which held the US copyright to "The Lion Sleeps Tonight", agreed to pay the family a lump sum representing royalties earned from 1987 onward and grant them a share of future income until 2017. The family's lawyers expressed satisfaction at these concessions. Furthermore, Linda received recognition for his work as well as a cowriting credit on "The Lion Sleeps Tonight". Nonetheless, the song continued stirring up legal conflict. Since the Linda family's settlement with Disney became void in 2017, they could not profit from the song's use in the 2019 film The Lion King.

== Partial discography ==
During his musical career, Solomon Linda recorded numerous songs, some of which were never released, at Gallo Recording Studio, accompanied by his vocal group, The Evening Birds.

- "Makasani" / "Mfo Ka Linda" (1938)
- "Ngqo Ngqongo Vula" / "Ngi Boni Sebeni" (1938)
- "Ntombi Ngangiyeshela" / "Hamba Pepa Lami" (1939)
- "Yetulisigqoko" (1939)
- "Mbube'' / "Ngi Hambile" (1939)
- "Sangena Mama" / "Sohlangana" (1939)
- "Sengiyofela Pesheya" / "Ziyekele Mama" (1939)
- "Jerusalema" / "Basibizalonkizwe" (1940)
- "Sigonde 'Mnambiti" / "Bhamporo" (1940)
- "Ngazula Emagumeni" / "Gijima Mfana" (1942)
- "Ndaba Zika Linda" / "Ngiyomutshel'Ubaba" (1942)

== Bibliography ==
=== Books and academic papers ===
- Ansell, Gwen (2005). Soweto Blues: Jazz, Popular Music, and Politics in South Africa. New York City, New York: Continuum International Publishing Group. ISBN 0-8264-1753-1.
- Coplan, David B. (2008). In Township Tonight!: South Africa's Black City Music and Theatre. Chicago, Illinois: The University of Chicago Press. ISBN 978-0-226-11567-2.
- Dean, Owen (April 2006). "The Return of the Lion" (PDF). WIPO Magazine. Geneva, Switzerland. Archived (PDF) from the original on 25 November 2023.
- Erlmann, Veit (1991). "Imbube: The Career of Solomon Linda". African Stars: Studies in Black South African Performance. Chicago, Illinois: The University of Chicago Press. ISBN 0-226-21724-8.
- Erlmann, Veit (1996). "The History of Isicathamiya, 1891–1991". Nightsong: Performance, Power, and Practice in South Africa. Chicago, Illinois: The University of Chicago Press. ISBN 0-226-21721-3.
- Erlmann, Veit (1999). Music, Modernity, and the Global Imagination: South Africa and the West. New York City, New York: Oxford University Press. ISBN 0-19-512367-0.
- Erlmann, Veit (2004). "Fantasies of Home: The antinomies of modernity and the music of Ladysmith Black Mambazo". In Frith, Simon (ed.). Popular Music: Critical Concepts in Media and Cultural Studios. Vol. 4. New York City, New York: Routledge. ISBN 0-415-33270-2.
- Malan, Rian (2012). "In the Jungle". The Lion Sleeps Tonight and Other Stories of Africa. New York City, New York: Grove Atlantic. ISBN 978-0-8021-1990-2.
- Muller, Carol A. (2008). Focus: Music of South Africa (2 ed.). New York City, New York: Routledge. ISBN 978-0-415-96071-7.
- Ovesen, Håvard; Haupt, Adam (October 2011). "Vindicating Capital: Heroes and Villains in A Lion's Trail". Ilha do Desterro (61): 73–107. doi:10.5007/2175-8026.2011n61p073.

=== News articles ===
- Bambalele, Patience (13 September 2022). "KZN town to be renamed after scathamiya pioneer Solomon Linda". The Sowetan. Archived from the original on 15 November 2025.
- Blair, David (30 October 2004). "Penniless singer's family sue Disney for Lion King royalties". The Telegraph. Archived from the original on 1 June 2025.
- Browne, David (7 November 2019). "'The Lion Sleeps Tonight': The Ongoing Saga of Pop's Most Contentious Song". Rolling Stone. Archived from the original on 27 May 2025.
- Connor, Alan (3 July 2018). "The Lion Sleeps Tonight—written by a Zulu migrant worker, made famous by Disney". Financial Times. Archived from the original on 12 February 2025.
- Chanda, Abhik Kumar (2 August 2004). "SA family to go ahead with Disney lawsuit" (PDF). Sunday Times. Archived from the original (PDF) on 8 April 2024 – via Stellenbosch University.
- Contreras, Felix (24 March 2006). "Family of 'Lion Sleeps Tonight' Writer to Get Millions". All Things Considered. NPR. Archived from the original on 23 June 2025.
- Gilmore, Inigo (11 June 2000). "Penniless singer's family sue Disney for Lion King royalties". The Telegraph. Archived from the original on 11 April 2025.
- Khumalo, Fred (2 July 2004). "Wimoweh royalties start to roll" (PDF). The Toronto Star. Archived from the original (PDF) on 8 April 2024 – via Stellenbosch University.
- Lafraniere, Sharon (22 March 2006). "In the Jungle, the Unjust Jungle, a Small Victory". The New York Times. Archived from the original on 2 August 2025.
- Lewis, Randy (14 May 2019). "Who wrote 'The Lion Sleeps Tonight'? A Netflix film seeks answers, and closure". Los Angeles Times. Archived from the original on 22 July 2025.
- Ngema, Zee (10 August 2020). "How the Creator of 'The Lion Sleeps Tonight' Finally Got His Due in 'Black Is King'". OkayAfrica. Archived from the original on 11 April 2025.
- Phillips, Lior (8 May 2023). "The Lion Sleeps Tonight: one song's journey from 1930s South Africa to Disney money-spinner". The Guardian. Archived from the original on 2 August 2025.
- Robinson, Simon (25 October 2004). "It's a Lawsuit, a Mighty Lawsuit". Time. Archived from the original on 2 August 2025.
- Vincent, Roger (3 July 2004). "A Legal Uproar Over Song in 'Lion King'". Los Angeles Times. Archived from the original on 2 August 2025.
- Wilberforce, Mark (29 December 2020). "Seeking justice for Lion Sleeps Tonight composer". BBC News. Archived from the original on 24 July 2025.
- "Disney rebuffs Lion song claim". BBC News. 7 July 2004. Archived from the original on 2 August 2025.
- "Disney settles Lion song dispute". BBC News. 16 February 2006. Archived from the original on 26 January 2025.
- "Family of Wimoweh songwriter should sleep well tonight—the lion must wait" (PDF). Toronto Star. 28 September 2004. Archived from the original (PDF) on 8 April 2024 – via Stellenbosch University.
- "Family sues Disney over Lion song". BBC News. 5 July 2004. Archived from the original on 1 November 2025.
- "'Lion Sleeps Tonight' royalty row". BBC News. 18 June 2003. Archived from the original on 2 August 2025.
- "Lion song settlement nears" (PDF). The Citizen. 28 September 2004. Archived from the original (PDF) on 8 April 2024 – via Stellenbosch University.

=== Other media ===
- Library of Congress Copyright Office. (1952). Catalog of Copyright Entries: Published Music. Vol. 6. Washington, D.C.: United States Government Publishing Office.
- Nye, Eric. "Pounds Sterling to Dollars: Historical Conversion of Currency". University of Wyoming. Archived from the original on 26 July 2025.
- Webster, Ian (17 October 2025). "Inflation Calculator". CPI Inflation Calculator. Archived from the original on 1 July 2025.
- "Billboard Music Week". Billboard Music Week. New York. 23 October 1961.
- "Solomon Linda's Original Evening Birds Mbube / NGI Hambiki". flatinternational. Archived from the original on 18 January 2024.
