= Sad Eyes (Robert John song) =

1979 single by Robert John

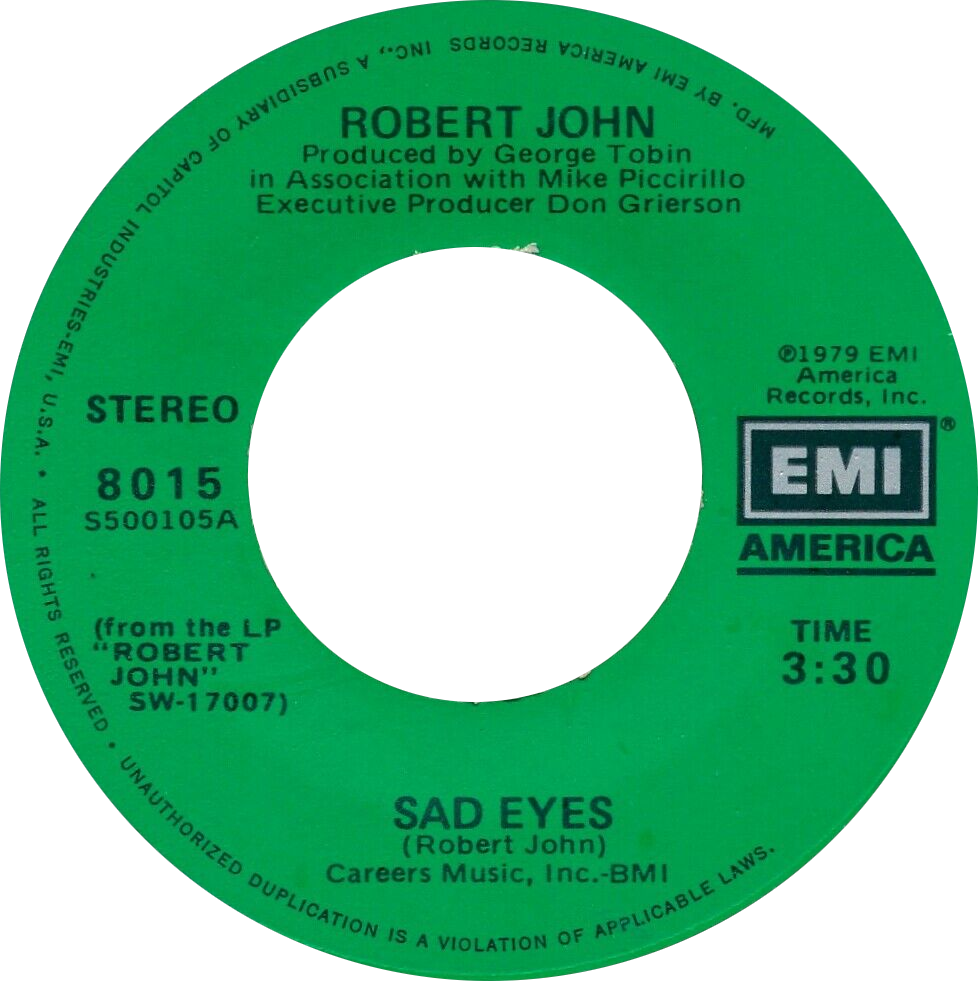
- Side A of US single

Single by Robert John

from the album Robert John
- B-side: "Am I Ever Gonna Hold You Again"
- Released: April 1979
- Recorded: 1979
- Genre: Soft rock; doo-wop
- Length: 4:12 (Album Version); 3:30 (Single Edit)
- Label: EMI America
- Songwriter: Robert John
- Producer: George Tobin in association with Mike Piccirillo

Robert John singles chronology
| "Hushabye" (1972) | "Sad Eyes" (1979) | "Only Time" (1979) |

"Sad Eyes" is a song written and recorded by Robert John, and released in April 1979. It debuted May 19 on the Billboard Hot 100, reaching the top of the chart the week of October 6. It was produced by George Tobin in association with Mike Piccirillo.

Reminiscent of the doo-wop ballads of the 1950s, "Sad Eyes" was released in April 1979. "Sad Eyes" is notable as the song that ended the six-week reign of the biggest smash hit of the year, The Knack's "My Sharona". This song explores the sadness experienced by a woman because her lover is leaving to return to his girlfriend/wife. The lyrics indicate that the relationship was intended from the start to be a temporary one that would end upon the girlfriend’s return. The song is told from the man’s point of view and expresses his efforts to console her.

== Charts ==
=== Weekly charts ===
| Chart (1979) | Peak position |
|---|---|
| Australia (Kent Music Report) | 9 |
| Canadian CRIA Singles | 2 |
| Canada Top Tracks (RPM) | 3 |
| Canada Adult Contemporary (RPM) | 10 |
| UK Singles Chart | 31 |
| US Billboard Hot 100 | 1 |
| US Adult Contemporary (Billboard) | 10 |

=== Year-end charts ===
| Chart (1979) | Rank |
|---|---|
| Australia (Kent Music Report) | 68 |
| Canada Top Tracks (RPM) | 14 |
| US Billboard Hot 100 | 10 |

== Certifications ==
| Region | Certification | Certified units/sales |
|---|---|---|
| Canada (Music Canada) | Gold | 75,000^{^} |
| United States (RIAA) | Gold | 1,000,000^{^} |
^{^} Shipments figures based on certification alone.

== Personnel ==
Album credits list these musicians involved during the sessions from which "Sad Eyes" was recorded.

- Robert John - vocals
- Dennis Belfield - bass
- Ed Greene - drums
- Stewart Levine, Mike Thompson - keyboards
- Darlene Love, George Tobin, Edna Wright - vocals
- Bill Neale - guitar
- Mike Piccirillo - engineer, guitar, vocals
- Ryan Ulyate - engineer
- Howard Lee Wolen - percussion, engineer

== Cover versions ==
A cover by American country music group Trader-Price peaked at number 55 on the Billboard Hot Country Singles chart in 1989. Kyle Vincent also recorded the song, released on Absolutely The Best of the 70s, credited to Bo Donaldson and The Heywoods, and produced by Ron Dante. Another rendition appeared on Robin Lee's album, Black Velvet, released in 1990.
