= My Traitor's Heart =

1990 autobiographical book by Rian Malan

My Traitor's Heart: A South African Exile Returns to Face His Country, His Tribe and His Conscience
- Author: Rian Malan
- Language: English
- Genre: Autobiography, Politics
- Publisher: Atlantic Monthly Press
- Publication date: 1990
- Publication place: South Africa
- Pages: 349
- ISBN: 0-87113-229-X
- OCLC: 20016093
- Dewey Decimal: 968/.00992 B 20
- LC Class: CT1929.M35 A3 1990

My Traitor's Heart is an autobiographical book by Rian Malan first published in 1990 on his return from exile. It is subtitled South African Exile Returns to Face His Country, His Tribe and His Conscience or Blood and Bad Dreams: A South African Exile Explores the Madness in His Country, His Tribe and Himself.

The book describes Malan's experience of growing up in Apartheid-era South Africa in which he explores race relations through prominent murder cases. In addition, he reflects on the history of his family, a prominent Afrikaner clan that migrated to the Cape in the 17th century and included Daniel François Malan, the South African Prime Minister who was a principal ideological force behind Apartheid doctrine.

The book became a best-seller, was translated into 11 languages and was still in print 14 years later. It has been called brilliant.
