= Eddie Holman =

American singer and musician (born 1946)

- Born: June 3, 1946 (age 80); Norfolk, Virginia, U.S.
- Genres: R&B; pop; soul; gospel
- Occupations: Singer; musician; minister; recording artist
- Years active: 1956–present
- Labels: Parkway; Agape; ABC
- Spouse: Sheila Holman (m. 1966–2024)
- Website: eddieholman.com

Eddie Holman (born June 3, 1946) is an American singer, musician, minister, and recording artist, best known for his distinctively high singing voice and his 1969 hit song "Hey There Lonely Girl", an adaptation of "Hey There Lonely Boy" by Ruby & the Romantics. His specialties range from R&B and pop to soul and gospel. He was inducted into the National Rhythm & Blues Hall of Fame in 2016.

In 1962, Holman began his recording career when he earned fame with his first record "What You Don't Know Won't Hurt You" with Leopard Records. In 1966, he recorded his first hit "This Can't Be True", which was followed by "Am I a Loser from the Start", "I Love You" (1969), "Don't Stop Now" (1970), and "Cathy Called" (1970). In 1963, "Hey There Lonely Boy" by Ruby & the Romantics was released. In 1969, Holman received critical acclaim with his ballad "Hey There Lonely Girl", which peaked at number 2 on the Billboard Hot 100 chart.

== Early life ==
Holman was born in Norfolk, Virginia on June 3, 1946. In 1954, at the age of 8, he and his mother Viola moved to New York City after his older sister Margaret moved to Brooklyn at age 21. There, his mother introduced him to the piano, guitar, singing, and the performing arts.

He regularly performed on The Children's Hour on NBC and was nicknamed "Little Eddie Holman" at the time.

== Career ==
In 1962, Holman made his first record "What You Don't Know Won't Hurt You" on Leopard Records. In the Philadelphia soul scene, he developed his trademark style. In college, he recorded his first hit record "This Can't Be True" (1966), which reached number 17 on the Billboard chart.

In 1969, Holman received critical acclaim with his ballad "Hey There Lonely Girl" (originally "Hey There Lonely Boy" by Ruby & the Romantics in 1963), which became his signature song and peaked at number 2 on the Billboard Hot 100 chart. The track peaked at number 4 in the UK Singles Chart in November 1974. It sold over one million copies and was awarded a gold disc from the R.I.A.A. in March 1970.

British journalist Tony Cummings wrote: "Eddie Holman's voice, an astonishing precision instrument which can leap octaves with the speed of mercury and bend notes into shapes unimagined by lesser singers, has assured its possessor a place in soul history."

In 1977, Holman had a brief resurgence in popularity with his last two hit singles "This Will Be a Night to Remember" and "You Make My Life Complete". He has credited such artists as Jackie Wilson and Nat King Cole as a huge influence, the former of whom Holman has said is his biggest influence. Holman said he and Wilson toured from New Haven, Connecticut and down to Tampa, Florida. Wilson had said he wanted Holman to share his dressing room. Holman explains that Wilson had mentored him and gave him helpful advice.

Holman owns his own record label Agape Records and music publishing company Schoochiebug Music Publishing ASCAP.

== Personal life ==
In 1966, Holman married Sheila Frances Ingrum. Together, they had three children and nine grandchildren. On October 13, 2024, Sheila died at Bryn Mawr Hospital of kidney failure at the age of 76.

== Discography ==
- I Love You (1969)
- A Night to Remember (1977)
- United (1985)
- Love Story (2007)

=== Compilations ===
- Eddie Holman and The Larks – Sweet Memories (1989)
- Eddie Holman and The Larks – Eddie's My Name (1993)
- This Can't Be True (2000)
- Hey There Lonely Girl (2014)

== See also ==
- List of 1970s one-hit wonders in the United States
