= Sam Cullman =

American film director

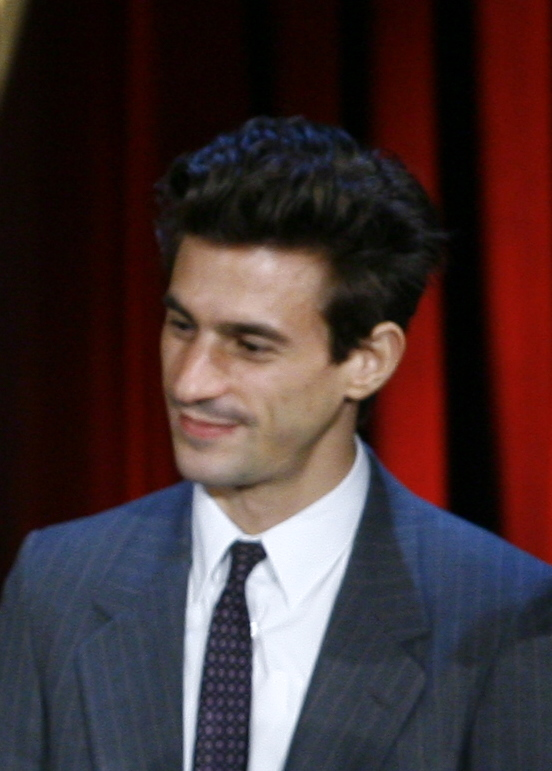
- Born: 1976

Sam Cullman (born 1976) is a cinematographer, director and editor of documentaries, and the founder of Yellow Cake Films, a film production company.

Cullman graduated from Brown University in 1999, receiving a degree in Urban Studies and Visual Arts.

== Career ==
Cullman was one of the camera operators on Why We Fight, which won Sundance's Grand Jury Prize for documentaries in 2005. He was a cinematographer on the 2007 documentary King Corn. Cullman was a producer and director of photography on The House I Live In, which was the Documentary Grand Jury Prize winner at Sundance 2012 and was the recipient of the "React to Film" Award at Silverdocs. He was also a cinematographer on Watchers of the Sky (2014).

On January 24, 2012, Cullman and Marshall Curry were nominated for an Academy Award for Best Documentary Feature for the film If a Tree Falls: A Story of the Earth Liberation Front. At the 84th Academy Awards, their film lost to Undefeated. In 2012, Cullman and Benjamin Rosen made Black Cherokee, a short subject, premiering in November 2012 as part of DOC NYC, a documentary film festival.

Cullman is a director, producer and the cinematographer of Art and Craft (2014), with director and producer Jennifer Grausman and co-director Mark Becker. On December 2, 2014, Art and Craft was shortlisted for an Academy Award for Best Documentary Feature. In 2016 Art and Craft was nominated for an Emmy in the Outstanding Arts and Culture Programming category.

Cullman directed ReMastered: The Lion's Share which won the 2020 Emmy for Outstanding Arts and Culture Documentary.

== Filmography ==
=== As a director ===
- 2011: Why We Fight (with Marshall Curry)
- 2012: Black Cherokee (with Benjamin Rosen)
- 2014: Art and Craft (with Jennifer Grausman and Mark Becker)
- 2018: ReMastered: The Lion's Share

== Personal life ==
Cullman is married to activist Purva Panday Cullman.
