= ReMastered: The Lion's Share =

2019 documentary film

- Film poster
- Directed by: Sam Cullman
- Written by: Jeff Zimbalist; Michael Zimbalist
- Starring: Rian Malan; Solomon Linda; Delphi Linda
- Distributed by: Netflix
- Release date: May 17, 2019
- Running time: 84 minutes
- Country: United States
- Languages: English; Zulu

ReMastered: The Lion's Share is a 2019 documentary film about the search by Rian Malan, a South African journalist, for the original writers of the famous song "The Lion Sleeps Tonight".

== Premise ==
The documentary takes a look at the controversy and legal battles around the song "The Lion Sleeps Tonight", which is one of the most recognisable songs in all pop music. The search for the song's roots in this documentary is done by the South African journalist Rian Malan.

== Cast ==
- Rian Malan
- Solomon Linda
- Delphi Linda
- Elizabeth Linda
- Fildah Linda
- Hanro Friedrich
- Rob Allingham
- Glen Dean
- Owen Dean
- Paul Jenkins, CEO of Johnnic Entertainment, which owns the South African label Gallo Records
- Pallo Jordan
- Mandla Mhlongo
- Nick Motsatse
- Zee Nzama
- Geoff Paynter
