= Robert John =

American singer (1946–2025)

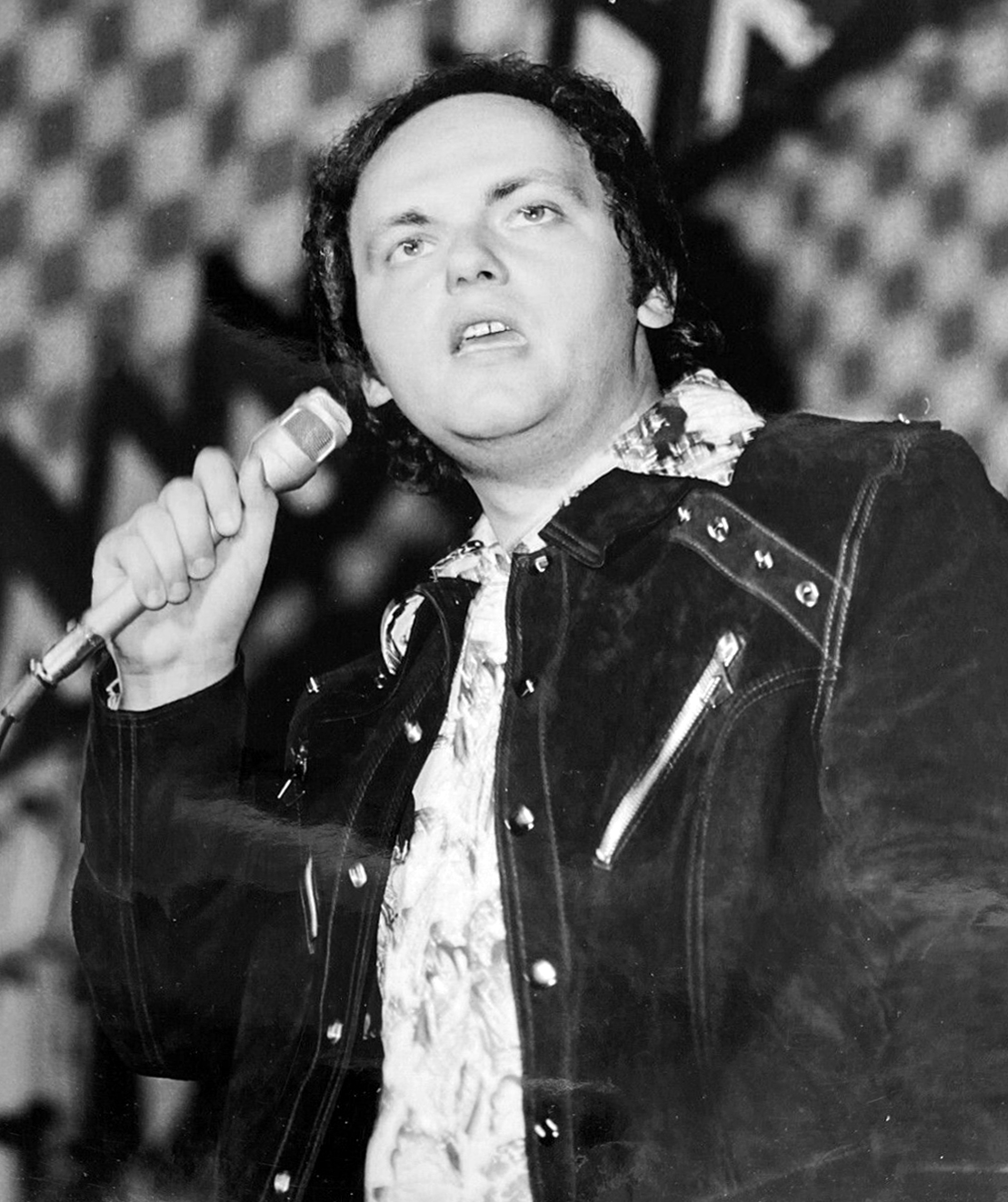
- John c. 1970s–1980s
- Born: Robert John Pedrick, Jr. January 3, 1946; New York City, U.S.
- Died: February 24, 2025 (aged 79); Las Vegas, Nevada, U.S.
- Occupations: Singer, songwriter
- Years active: c. 1950s–1990s

Robert John Pedrick Jr. (January 3, 1946 – February 24, 2025), known professionally as Robert John, was an American singer perhaps best known for his 1979 hit single, "Sad Eyes", which reached number 1 on the US Billboard Hot 100.

== Life and career ==
John was born in Brooklyn, New York, on January 3, 1946. Under the name of Bobby Pedrick, Jr., he first hit the pop chart in 1958 when he was only 12 years old with "White Bucks and Saddle Shoes", written by Doc Pomus and Mort Shuman. As the lead singer of Bobby & The Consoles, he had the minor 1963 hit entitled "My Jelly Bean" on Diamond Records. By 1965, he had changed his name and signed with MGM Records for two ill-fated singles. In 1967, he signed a contract with Columbia Records and released a string of singles with help from writing partner Mike Gately.

After a short tenure from 1970 to 1971 with Herb Alpert's A&M Records, 1971 brought his next hit, a cover version of The Tokens' 1961 hit, "The Lion Sleeps Tonight", which climbed to number 3 on the Billboard Hot 100 in 1972, selling over one million copies and receiving a gold disc awarded by the Recording Industry Association of America on March 15, 1972. John also wrote the track "I Can't Move No Mountains" for jazz rock band Blood, Sweat and Tears, released on their 1972 album New Blood. The song was eventually released as a single but did not chart. Several years later, while working in construction in Long Branch, New Jersey, John was approached by George Tobin, a record producer and songwriter based in California, who wanted to produce a record for John. Tobin recalled in Fred Bronson's The Billboard Book of #1 Hits: "I had him come out and he lived in my house. He was actually a laborer in New Jersey at the time, carrying bricks on a construction job. I was looking for material for him and I heard a song called "My Angel Baby" (by Toby Beau) and said, 'That's the kind of song Robert should be doing.' So we used that as a frame of reference. Robert wrote 'Sad Eyes' and rewrote it for about three months. Every time he'd write it I'd go, 'Nah, change this and change that.' " Eventually signing with EMI America Records, John hit number one with "Sad Eyes", in 1979.

John recorded for Arista Records with guitarist Bobby Mancari and keyboardist Steve Butera, as well as Bread and Butter on Motown in 1984. A re-recorded version of "The Lion Sleeps Tonight" was released on his 1992 greatest hits album.

John died on February 24, 2025, at the age of 79. Several years prior, he had suffered a severe stroke from which he had never fully recovered.

== Select discography ==
=== Albums ===
- 1968: If You Don't Want My Love
- 1971: On the Way Up
- 1979: Robert John – US No. 68, CAN No. 81
- 1980: Back on the Street – US No. 205

=== Singles ===
Year	Title	Chart positions				
Year	Title	US	US AC	Australia	UK	CAN
1958	"White Bucks and Saddle Shoes" (as Bobby Pedrick, Jr.)	74	—	—	—	12
1963	"My Jelly Bean" (as Bobby & The Consoles)	—	—	—	—	—
1968	"If You Don't Want My Love"	49	—	—	42	21
1968	"Don't Leave Me"	108	—	—	—	—
1970	"When the Party is Over"	71	—	—	—	60
1972	"The Lion Sleeps Tonight"	3	6	31	—	15
1972	"Hushabye"	99	—	—	—	70
1979	"Sad Eyes"	1	10	9	31	3
1979	"Only Time"	102	42	—	—	—
1979	"Lonely Eyes"	41	49	—	—	80
1980	"Hey There Lonely Girl"	31	10	—	—	81
1980	"Sherry"	70	—	—	—	—
1983	"Bread and Butter"	68	—	—	—	—
1984	"Greased Lightning"^{*}	—	—	—	—	—

- ^{*}"Greased Lightning" – peaked at No. 60 on the US Dance chart
