= If You Don't Want My Love =

Single by Robert John

from the album If You Don't Want My Love
- B-side: "Don't"
- Released: April 1968
- Genre: Sunshine pop
- Length: 2:25
- Label: Columbia
- Songwriters: Michael Gately, R. Pedrick, L. David
- Producer: David Rubinson

Robert John singles chronology
"White Bucks and Saddle Shoes" (1958)	"If You Don't Want My Love" (1968)	"When the Party Is Over" (1970)

"If You Don't Want My Love" is a song by Robert John from 1968. It became a hit in the U.S. (Billboard number 49, Cash Box number 34) and the UK (number 42). It did best in Canada, where it reached number 21.

The song was written and performed with Michael Gately, as was the B-side of the single, "Don't".

"If You Don't Want My Love" was the first charting hit of John's adult career. At age 12 he had previously had a minor hit in 1958 with "White Bucks and Saddle Shoes" under his given name, Bobby Pedrick Jr.

== Chart history ==
Chart (1968)	Peak position
Canada RPM Top Singles	21
UK (OCC)	42
US Billboard Hot 100	49
US Cash Box Top 100	34
US Record World	65
