= Hey There Lonely Girl =

1969 single by Eddie Holman

"Hey There Lonely Boy"

Single by Ruby & the Romantics

from the album Greatest Hits Album
- B-side: "Not a Moment Too Soon"
- Released: August 1963
- Recorded: 1963
- Genre: R&B, soul
- Length: 2:34
- Label: Kapp
- Songwriters: Leon Carr; Earl Shuman
- Producer: Allen Stanton

Ruby & the Romantics singles chronology
"My Summer Love" (1963)	"Hey There Lonely Boy" (1963)	"Young Wings Can Fly (Higher Than You Know)" (1963)

"Hey There Lonely Girl"

Single by Eddie Holman

from the album I Love You
- B-side: "It's All in the Game"
- Released: December 1969
- Recorded: 1969
- Studio: Virtue Studios, Philadelphia, Pennsylvania
- Genre: Soul
- Length: 3:01
- Label: ABC
- Songwriters: Leon Carr; Earl Shuman
- Producer: Peter De Angelis

Eddie Holman singles chronology
"I Love You" (1969)	"Hey There Lonely Girl" (1969)	"Don't Stop Now" (1970)

"Hey There Lonely Girl" is a song released in 1969 by Eddie Holman. The original version "Hey There Lonely Boy" was recorded in 1963 by Ruby & the Romantics. It was a hit for both of them. It has since been recorded by many other artists.

== Ruby & the Romantics version ==
The group's original 1963 recording was a Top 30 hit, peaking at #27 on the Billboard Hot 100 pop chart. "Hey There Lonely Boy" also reached #5 on Billboard's Middle-road singles chart.

== Eddie Holman version ==
In 1969, Holman released his own version of the song. It peaked at number 2 on the U.S. Billboard Hot 100 pop chart in 1970. On the U.S. soul singles chart, it went to number 4. It peaked at number 1 on the Canadian RPM chart and number 42 on the Australian chart. Four years after its US / Canadian release, the single went to number 4 on the UK Singles Chart; it is his highest charting single in each country.

== Other versions ==
- Shaun Cassidy's 1977 version was a track on his debut LP. It reached # 5 in Australia.
- Robert John, in 1980, for the album Back on the Street (US #31).
- British boy band Big Fun covered the song for their 1990 album A Pocketful of Dreams, produced by Stock Aitken Waterman, and released it as the fourth single in July 1990, peaking at number 62 in the UK chart. The track was subsequently denounced by band member Phil Creswick. David Giles of Music Week panned this version as being the "SAW worst production", noting Big Fun members' "ridiculous whining voices" and deemed it as unlikely to be a hit.

== See also ==
- List of 1960s one-hit wonders in the United States
