= Back on the Street =

Studio album by Robert John
- Released: 1980
- Recorded: 1979–1980
- Studio: Studio Sound Recorders, North Hollywood
- Genre: Pop rock, soft rock
- Label: EMI America Records
- Producer: George Tobin, Mike Piccirillo (associate producer)

Robert John chronology
Robert John (1979)	Back on the Street (1980)

Professional ratings
Review scores
Source	Rating
Allmusic	2/5 stars

Back on the Street is the final major-label album by American singer-songwriter Robert John.

== Track listing ==
1. "(So Long) Since I Felt This Way" (Gary Goetzman, Mike Piccirillo)
2. "Hey There Lonely Girl" (Earl Shulman, Leon Carr)
3. "Just One More Try" (Robert John, Alvin Fields)
4. "On My Own" (Goetzman, Piccirillo)
5. "Give Up Your Love" (Goetzman, Piccirillo)
6. "Sherry" (Bob Gaudio)
7. "Winner Take All" (John, Tom Pedrick)
8. "Hurtin' Doesn't Go Away" (John)
9. "Back on the Street Again" (Goetzman, Piccirilo)
10. "You Could Have Told Me" (John)

== Personnel ==
- Robert John – vocals
- George Tobin in association with Mike Piccirillo – production

== Production ==
- Arranged, produced and mixed by George Tobin and Mike Piccirillo.
- Recorded by Mark Wolfson and H. Lee Wolen.
