= François Verster =

South African film director and documentary maker

- Born: 12 February 1969 (age 57); Bloemfontein, South Africa
- Occupations: Film director documentary maker

François Verster (born 1969) is an independent South African film director and documentary maker.

He has a wide background in writing, music, academia and film. After completing an MA degree with distinction under literature Nobel Prize laureate J. M. Coetzee at the University of Cape Town, he worked with Barenholtz Productions in New York and as crew member on various independent features. Verster's acclaimed debut as documentary director/producer was Pavement Aristocrats: The Bergies of Cape Town.

He takes an observational approach to social issues in his films, which have won local and international awards. Verster has taught documentary directing and film studies, and was the lecturer of the film component of the Communicating the Humanities project, Centre for Humanities Research at the University of the Western Cape. His films are used in seminars on the intersection between creative documentary and social activism.

In 1998, Verster formed Undercurrent Film & Television, a Cape Town-based company that aims to produce quality documentary programmes for local as well as international markets.

In 2006, A Lion's Trail, which Verster directed and co-produced, received an Emmy Award for Outstanding Artistic and Cultural Programming.

== Themes ==
Verster's movies have an "undercurrent" theme of social injustice and people picking up the pieces of their lives. He is not an "in and out" filmmaker but builds up a relationship with his protagonists, allowing his audience a very intimate and empathetic look into their hearts and homes. Working within tight budget constraints, Verster documents their lives, often over a number of years, and is involved with his protagonists past and wellbeing as much as with their future.

Pavement Aristocrats is a work that examines the lives of some of Cape Town’s bergies (a local term for homeless people). It has been described as combining humor with a sympathetic portrayal of its subjects.

The Story of "Mbube" and A Lion's Trail track the story of the song "Wimoweh/The Lion Sleeps Tonight" back to its Zulu composer Solomon Linda and follows the song's rocky history from South Africa to Brooklyn and back asking why Linda died penniless and his children live in poverty while American artists made millions off the song. The movie was screened by PBS and helped Linda's family to find the support to take Disney, which used the song in the movie the Lion King, to court. In February 2006, Abilene Music, which holds the copyright for "Wimoweh/The Lion Sleeps Tonight", settled the case with the Solomon Linda family out of court for an undisclosed sum. In September 2006 A Lion's Trail received the Emmy Award for most outstanding cultural and artistic programming. It is a modern African story of a David and Goliath fight and at the same time a joyful celebration of Solomon Linda's and South African music.

When the War is Over tells a story of two ex-Apartheid activists from the same resistance group who fought for the new democratic South Africa. Their friend has been killed by security police after having been sold out by a police spy within the group. They have won freedom but now they have to make a living in a society which is still haunted by violence, betrayals from the past and poverty. Gori has joined the South African Army, Marlon has become a gangster. While each of them tries to make sense of his life after the struggle, they manage to maintain a friendship despite the different realities their different "career" choices put them in.

The Mothers' House is a record of four years in the life of Miché, a charming, precocious yet troubled teenage girl growing into womanhood in post-Apartheid South Africa. Living with her mother and grandmother in Bonteheuwel, a "coloured" township outside Cape Town, she has to face not only life in a community troubled by gangsterism and drug abuse, but also what it means to break the unbearable cycle of emotional and physical violence imprisoning her own family.

== Selected filmography ==
- Pavement Aristocrats (1998) Director, Producer (1999 Avanti Award Best Documentary & Avanti Craft Award)
- The Story of "Mbube" (1999) (TV) Director, Producer (1999 National Television & Video Association Silver Stone & Stone Craft Award)
- The Man Who Would Kill Kitchener (1999) Director, Producer (1999 NTVA Silver Stone & Stone Craft Award) The life of Fritz Joubert Duquesne, a Boer captain and German spy during both world wars, was the subject of this documentary film.
- The Granite War (2000)
- Guilty (2001) (Cinema film) Director, Writer (2002 NTVA Silver Stone & Stone Craft Award)
- A Lion's Trail (2002) Director, Producer, Camera (2006 Emmy Award) (2003 Best Documentary, Portobello) (2003 Silver Dhow, Best Documentary, Zanzibar International Film Festival) (2003 Special Selection, Parnu) (2003 NTVA Stone & Stone Craft Award)
- When the War is Over (2002) Director, Producer, Camera (2004 Best Documentary, Milan African Film Festival) (2003 Best Film, Norwegian Documentary Film Festival) (2003 Signis Award, Zanzibar) (2003 Official Selection, Fespaco) (2003 NTVA Gold Stone & Stone Craft Award) (2002 Official Selection Silver Wolf Competition, Idfa)
- The Mothers' House (2005) Director, Camera (2006 Best Documentary Apollo Film Festival) (2006 Best Documentary Zimbabwe International Film Festival) (Jury's Special Mention, Norwegian Film Festival) (2005 Best Documentary, Cape Town World Cinema Festival)
- Sea Point Days (2008) Director, Producer, Camera, Editor
- The Dream of Sharazad (2014) Director, Producer, Sound, Camera, Editor (2012 Best Documentary in Progress, Sunny Side of the Doc, 2012 IDFA Forum Selection, 2014 IDFA Masters Selection, 2015 Best Film International Television Competition AVANCA, 2015 Best South African Documentary Durban IFF, 2015 Al-Husseini Abou-Deif prize for Best Film, Freedom Competition, and Golden Mask of Tutankhamen/Artwatch Africa Prize, Luxor African Film Festival, 2016 SAFTA Award Best Documentary, Best Documentary Directing, 2016 Jury Prize Helsinki African Film Festival)
- Whispering Truth to Power (2018) Producer, Camera, Editor. Director Shameela Seedat
- Scenes from a Dry City (2018) Director, Sound, Camera, Co-Editor (2019 Best Mini-Documentary Big Sky Documentary Film Festival, 2019 SAFTA nomination 2019 for Best Short Documentary, Vimeo Staff Pics, 2020 Emmy Nomination Best Short Documentary, 2020 World Press Photo Award (Digital Storytelling), 2019 Best International Short Film Cinemambiente Environmental Film Festival, 2020 Long-listed Academy Awards)
- African Moot (2022) Producer, DOP, Sound, Editor. Director Shameela Seedat (2021 Hot Docs Forum selection, 2022 Hot Docs Official Selection, 2022 Sydney Film Festival Official Selection, 2022 Competition selection, Durban International Film Festival, 2022 International Competition section DocNYC 2022, 2022 Best of Fests IDFA)
- Girl, Taken (2022) Director, Producer, Camera, Sound, Writer, Co-Editor. (2022 Best South African Documentary Durban International Film Festival)
