= The Very Best Of (Alannah Myles album) =

Compilation album by Alannah Myles
- Released: November 12, 1998 (Canada & Europe), April 6, 1999 (USA)
- Recorded: 1988–1998
- Genres: Rock, pop-rock, blues
- Length: 58:38
- Label: Ark 21 Records
- Producer: Various

Alannah Myles chronology
A Rival (1997)	The Very Best Of (1998)	Myles & More (2001)

The Very Best Of is a 1998 compilation album by Canadian singer-songwriter Alannah Myles, her first compilation after four studio albums. It was rated four stars by AllMusic.

== Background ==
Released as a "parting gift" to Myles' former label, Atlantic Records, with whom she had released her first three studio albums, this compilation served to terminate her contract with the label. Released through Ark 21 Records, the label ran by Myles' then-manager Miles Copeland III that had released Myles' fourth album A Rival, the compilation includes material from her four studio albums, with the songs personally hand-picked and sequenced by Myles herself.

Including most of her singles released up to that point, including her best-known hit "Black Velvet", Myles also recorded two new songs for the compilation: a cover of Linda Ronstadt's 1970 hit "Long, Long Time" and the Peter Zizzo & Nicky Holland-written original "Break The Silence". The latter was released as a promotional single, and in 2001 was covered by Russian singer Alsou.

Myles saw no royalties or residuals from the sales of this album and litigated with Copeland for years until reaching an agreement and gaining back the new material from the compilation in 2014. As a result, Myles released "Long Long Time" as a digital single through her own label Fascinate in August 2015.

== Release and reception ==
First released in November 1998 in Canada and Europe, the USA release did not happen until April 1999. The Canadian and USA editions feature 12 tracks, while the European edition has three bonus songs selected by Copeland: "The Great Divide", from 1997's "A Rival", which had been touted at the time as a second single off the album, and two songs from film soundtracks which were released as singles in Europe: "You Love Who You Love" (from the film Two If by Sea) and a duet with Italian singer Zucchero "What Are We Waiting For" (from the film Prince Valiant).

== Track listing ==
The Very Best of Alannah Myles – Standard edition
No.	Title	Writer(s)	Producer(s)	Length
1.	"Black Velvet" (from Alannah Myles, 1989)	Christopher Ward; David Tyson	Tyson	4:49
2.	"Break the Silence"	Nicky Holland; Peter Zizzo	Alannah Myles	5:40
3.	"Everybody's Breaking Up" (from A-lan-nah, 1995)	Pat MacDonald	Pat Moran	4:34
4.	"Love Is" (from Alannah Myles, 1989)	Ward; Tyson	Tyson	3:38
5.	"Song Instead of a Kiss" (from Rockinghorse, 1992)	Myles; Robert Priest; Nancy Simmonds	Tyson	5:04
6.	"Sonny Say You Will" (from Rockinghorse, 1992)	Ward	Tyson	5:05
7.	"Bad 4 You" (from A Rival, 1997)	Myles; Desmond Child; Eric Bazilian	Myles	3:53
8.	"Our World Our Times" (from Rockinghorse, 1992)	Tyson; Ward	Tyson	6:18
9.	"Long, Long Time"	Gary White	Myles	5:13
10.	"Family Secret" (from A-lan-nah, 1995)	Ward; Tyson	Moran	5:16
11.	"Lover of Mine" (from Alannah Myles, 1989)	Myles; Kit Johnson; Ward; Tyson	Tyson	4:35
12.	"Still Got This Thing" (from Alannah Myles, 1989)	Ward	Tyson	4:35

The Very Best of Alannah Myles – European edition
No.	Title	Writer(s)	Producer(s)	Length
1.	"Black Velvet" (from Alannah Myles, 1989)	Christopher Ward; David Tyson	Tyson	4:49
2.	"Break the Silence"	Nicky Holland; Peter Zizzo	Alannah Myles	5:40
3.	"Everybody's Breaking Up" (from A-lan-nah, 1995)	Pat MacDonald	Pat Moran	4:34
4.	"Love Is" (from Alannah Myles, 1989)	Ward; Tyson	Tyson	3:38
5.	"Song Instead of a Kiss" (from Rockinghorse, 1992)	Myles; Robert Priest; Nancy Simmonds	Tyson	5:04
6.	"Sonny Say You Will" (from Rockinghorse, 1992)	Ward	Tyson	5:05
7.	"Our World Our Times" (from Rockinghorse, 1992)	Tyson; Ward	Tyson	6:18
8.	"Long, Long Time"	Gary White	Myles	5:13
9.	"Great Divide" (from A Rival, 1997)	Myles; Maia Sharp; Greg Wells	Myles	4:24
10.	"Family Secret" (from A-lan-nah, 1995)	Ward; Tyson	Moran	5:16
11.	"Lover of Mine" (from Alannah Myles, 1989)	Myles; Kit Johnson; Ward; Tyson	Tyson	4:35
12.	"Bad 4 You" (from A Rival, 1997)	Myles; Desmond Child; Eric Bazilian	Myles	3:53
13.	"What Are We Waiting For" (with Zucchero) (from Prince Valiant (soundtrack), 1997)	Phil Roy; Simon Wilson; Siobhan Maher	David Tickle	3:59
14.	"You Love Who You Love" (from Two if by Sea (soundtrack), 1996)	Carole Sager; Paddy Moloney	Guy Roche	3:56
15.	"Still Got This Thing" (from Alannah Myles, 1989)	Ward	Tyson	4:35
