= Alannah Myles discography =

- Studio albums: 6
- EPs: 1
- Compilation albums: 2
- Singles: 19

This is the discography of Canadian singer-songwriter Alannah Myles.

== Albums ==
=== Studio albums ===
Title	Album details	Peak chart positions										Certifications
Title	Album details	CAN	AUS	AUT	FIN	GER	NZ	SWE	SWI	UK	US	Certifications
Alannah Myles	Released: March 28, 1989; Label: Atlantic; Formats: CD, LP, MC	1	2	2	1	2	5	2	1	3	5	CAN: Diamond; AUS: 3× Platinum; UK: Gold; US: Platinum
Rockinghorse	Released: October 13, 1992; Label: Atlantic; Formats: CD, LP, MC	9	65	40	19	53	—	23	16	—	—	CAN: 2× Platinum
A-lan-nah	Released: August 15, 1995; Label: Atlantic; Formats: CD, LP, MC	47	—	—	—	—	—	—	40	—	—	
A Rival	Released: October 1997; Label: Ark 21; Formats: CD, MC	—	—	—	—	—	—	—	—	—	—	
Black Velvet	Released: April 2008; Label: Linus Entertainment; Formats: CD	—	—	—	—	—	—	—	—	—	—	
85 BPM	Released: 29 April 2014; Label: Fascinate; Formats: CD, digital download	—	—	—	—	—	—	—	—	—	—	
"—" denotes releases that did not chart or were not released in that territory.

=== Compilation albums ===
Title	Album details
The Very Best Of	Released: November 12, 1998; Label: Ark 21; Formats: CD
Myles & More: The Very Best Of	Released: April 2001; Label: Ark 21/Universal; Formats: CD

== EPs ==
Title	EP details
Elvis Tribute EP	Released: August 14, 2007; Label: Linus Entertainment; Formats: digital download

== Singles ==
Title	Year	Peak chart positions										Certifications	Album
Title	Year	CAN	CAN AC	AUS	BEL (FL)	FIN	GER	NL	NZ	UK	US	Certifications	Album
"Love Is"	1989	16	—	12	39	14	45	25	44	61	36	AUS: Gold	Alannah Myles
"Black Velvet"	1989	10	—	3	2	4	2	3	2	2	1	AUS: Platinum; NZ: 3× Platinum; UK: Platinum; US: Gold	Alannah Myles
"Still Got This Thing"	1990	28	—	64	—	—	—	—	26	—	—		Alannah Myles
"Lover of Mine"	1990	2	1	47	40	16	—	61	40	78	—		Alannah Myles
"Song Instead of a Kiss"	1992	1	1	152	—	12	—	35	—	89	—		Rockinghorse
"Tumbleweed" [airplay]	1992	51	—	—	—	—	—	—	—	—	—		Rockinghorse
"Our World Our Times"	1993	27	—	—	—	—	—	—	—	—	—		Rockinghorse
"Living on a Memory"	1993	31	—	—	—	—	—	—	—	—	—		Rockinghorse
"Sonny Say You Will" [airplay]	1993	23	15	—	—	—	—	—	—	—	—		Rockinghorse
"I Never Loved a Man (The Way I Love You)" (with Nine Below Zero)	1994	—	—	—	—	—	—	—	—	—	—		Hot Music for a Cold Night (by Nine Below Zero)
"Family Secret"	1995	10	8	—	—	—	—	—	—	—	—		A-lan-nah
"Blow Wind Blow" [airplay]	1996	64	11	—	—	—	—	—	—	—	—		A-lan-nah
"You Love Who You Love"	1996	—	—	—	—	—	—	—	—	—	—		Two If by Sea: Original Motion Picture Soundtrack
"Bad 4 You"	1997	45	—	—	—	—	—	—	—	—	—		A Rival
"What Are We Waiting For" (with Zucchero)	1998	—	—	—	48	—	—	—	—	—	—		Prince Valiant (soundtrack)
"Break the Silence" [promo]	1998	—	—	—	—	—	—	—	—	—	—		The Very Best Of
"Like Flames"	2000	—	—	—	—	—	98	—	—	—	—		Myles & More: The Very Best Of
"Comment Ça Va" [promo]	2008	—	—	—	—	—	—	—	—	—	—		Black Velvet
"Can't Stand the Rain"	2014	—	—	—	—	—	—	—	—	—	—		85 BPM
"—" denotes releases that did not chart or were not released in that territory.

== Guest appearances ==
- "Give Peace a Chance" (1991 charity single as part of Peace Choir)
- "Don't Give Up" (duet with Saga, released as a B-side to the latter's 2001 single "Money Talks")
- "Try to Live Again" and "I'll Remember You" (both duets with Joe Lynn Turner, from the 2001 Nikolo Kotzev rock opera Nostradamus.
- "I Can't Stand the Rain" (with Jeff Healey, from the 2006 album MTM Music – 10th Anniversary)
- "Back & Forth" (backing vocals, from Tiles' 2008 album Fly Paper)
- "We Got It All" (duet with Kee Marcello, from the latter's 2011 Redux: Melon Demon Divine)
