= List of number-one singles of 1992 (Canada) =

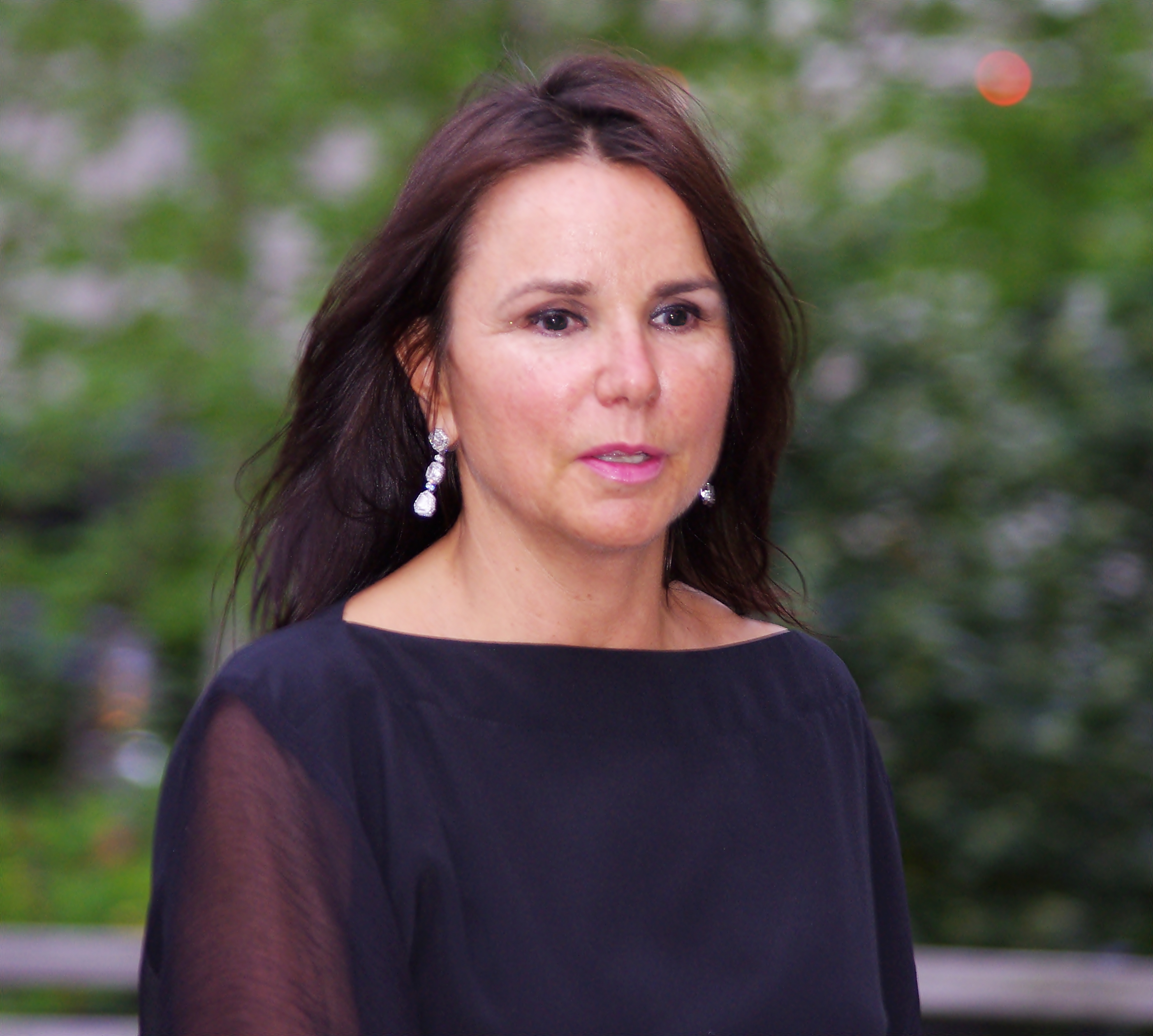
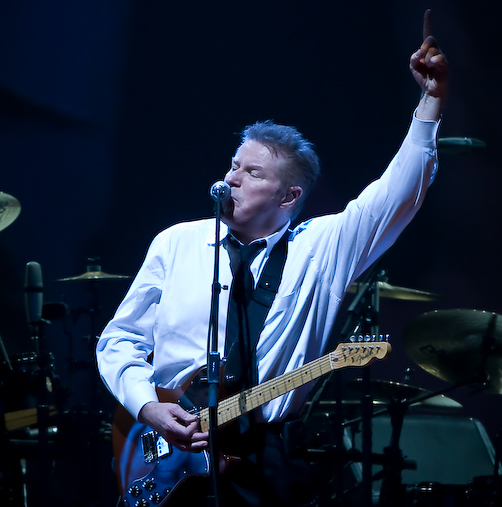
Patty Smyth (top) and Don Henley (bottom) collaborated on "Sometimes Love Just Ain't Enough", the most successful hit in Canada during 1992.

RPM was a Canadian magazine that published the best-performing singles of Canada from 1964 to 2000. A total of twenty singles reached number one on the RPM Singles Chart in 1992. The year began with "No Son of Mine" by Genesis at the top spot and ended with Whitney Houston's "I Will Always Love You" at the summit. Seven acts obtained their first Canadian number-one hit as either a solo or featured artist: Mr. Big, Vanessa Williams, Celine Dion, Trey Lorenz, Patty Smyth, Annie Lennox, and Alannah Myles. Genesis, U2, Elton John, and Eric Clapton each achieved two number-one singles during the year.

The best-performing single of the year in Canada was "Sometimes Love Just Ain't Enough", a duet between Patty Smyth and Don Henley, which topped the chart for seven weeks in September and October. Three Canadian acts scored a number-one single this year: Bryan Adams, Celine Dion, and Alannah Myles. Best known for her 1989 hit "Black Velvet", Myles' highest-charting song in her home country is "Song Instead of a Kiss", which topped the Canadian chart for four weeks in November and December. Celine Dion also picked up her first homeland chart-topper with "If You Asked Me To", which stayed at number one for three nonconsecutive weeks.

U2 remained at number one for six weeks with their two number-one singles—"Mysterious Ways" and "One"—while Elton John and Mr. Big each topped the chart for five weeks with their hit records. Mariah Carey and Trey Lorenz also had a five-week stint at number one with "I'll Be There", and George Michael and Madonna both logged three weeks at the summit this year.

Key
† Indicates best-performing single of 1992

== Chart history ==
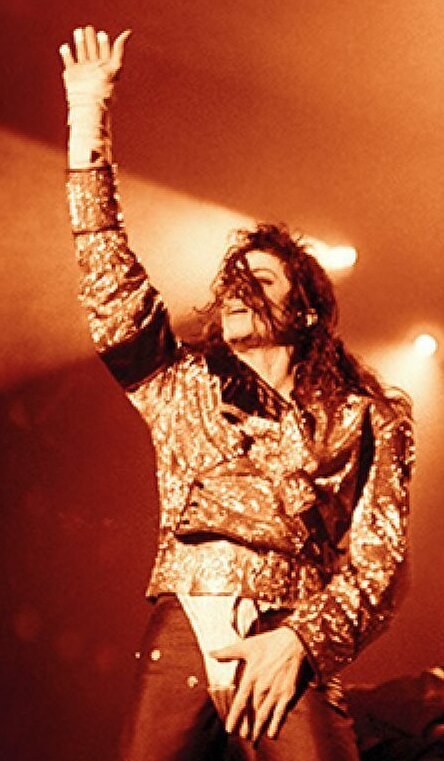
Michael Jackson's "Black or White" stayed at number one for two weeks in January.

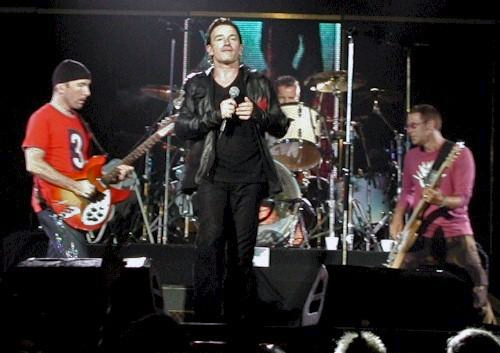
Irish rock band U2 totalled six weeks at number one in 1992 with two songs: "Mysterious Ways" and "One".

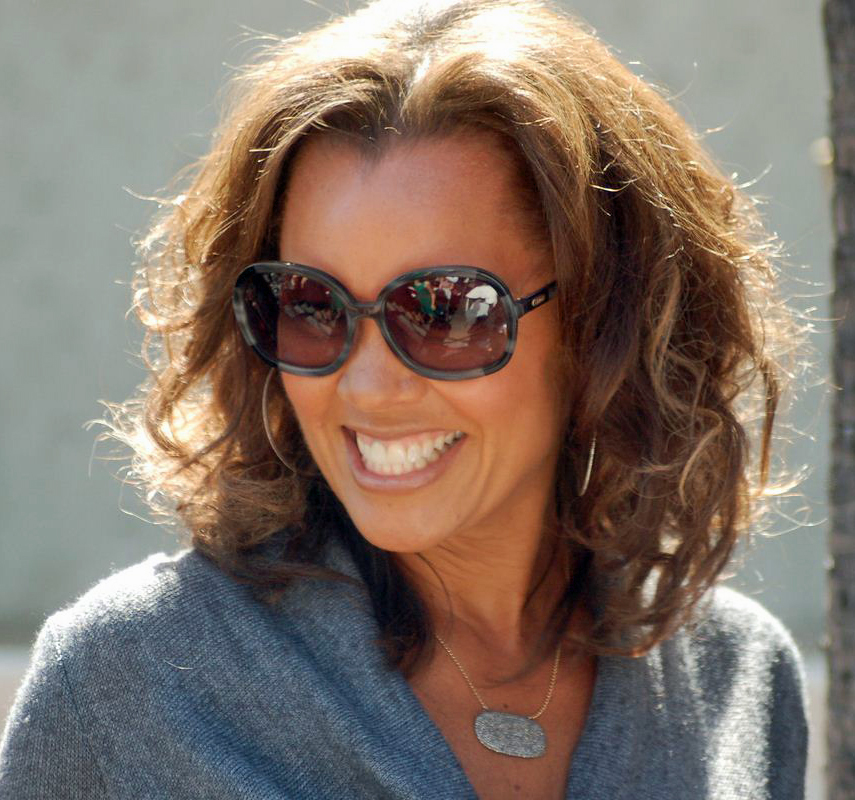
Vanessa Williams held the number-one spot for a week in May with "Save the Best for Last".

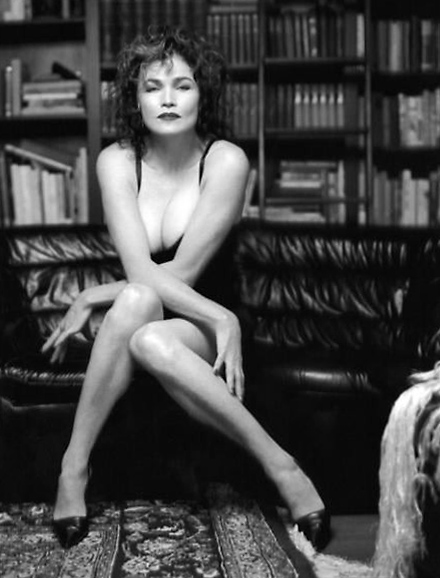
Canadian singer Alannah Myles garnered her first number-one single in her home country with "Song Instead of a Kiss" in late 1992.

Issue date	Song	Artist	Reference
4 January (Note: Due to a three-week break in publication over the 1991/1992 Christmas/New Year period, the weeks of 4 January and 11 January are inferred.)	"No Son of Mine"	Genesis	
11 January	"No Son of Mine"	Genesis	
18 January	"Black or White"	Michael Jackson	
25 January	"Black or White"	Michael Jackson	
1 February	"Mysterious Ways"	U2	
8 February	"Mysterious Ways"	U2	
15 February	"Don't Let the Sun Go Down on Me"	George Michael and Elton John	
22 February	"Don't Let the Sun Go Down on Me"	George Michael and Elton John	
29 February	"Don't Let the Sun Go Down on Me"	George Michael and Elton John	
7 March	"To Be with You"	Mr. Big	
14 March	"To Be with You"	Mr. Big	
21 March	"To Be with You"	Mr. Big	
28 March	"To Be with You"	Mr. Big	
4 April	"To Be with You"	Mr. Big	
11 April	"Tears in Heaven"	Eric Clapton	
18 April	"Tears in Heaven"	Eric Clapton	
25 April	"Thought I'd Died and Gone to Heaven"	Bryan Adams	
2 May	"Save the Best for Last"	Vanessa Williams	
9 May	"One"	U2	
16 May	"One"	U2	
23 May	"One"	U2	
30 May	"One"	U2	
6 June	"If You Asked Me To"	Celine Dion	
13 June	"If You Asked Me To"	Celine Dion	
20 June	"Hold on My Heart"	Genesis	
27 June	"If You Asked Me To"	Celine Dion	
4 July	"You Won't See Me Cry"	Wilson Phillips	
11 July	"I'll Be There"	Mariah Carey featuring Trey Lorenz	
18 July	"I'll Be There"	Mariah Carey featuring Trey Lorenz	
25 July	"I'll Be There"	Mariah Carey featuring Trey Lorenz	
1 August	"I'll Be There"	Mariah Carey featuring Trey Lorenz	
8 August	"I'll Be There"	Mariah Carey featuring Trey Lorenz	
15 August	"This Used to Be My Playground"	Madonna	
22 August	"This Used to Be My Playground"	Madonna	
29 August	"This Used to Be My Playground"	Madonna	
5 September	"The One"	Elton John	
12 September	"The One"	Elton John	
19 September	"Sometimes Love Just Ain't Enough"†	Patty Smyth and Don Henley	
26 September	"Sometimes Love Just Ain't Enough"†	Patty Smyth and Don Henley	
3 October	"Sometimes Love Just Ain't Enough"†	Patty Smyth and Don Henley	
10 October	"Sometimes Love Just Ain't Enough"†	Patty Smyth and Don Henley	
17 October	"Sometimes Love Just Ain't Enough"†	Patty Smyth and Don Henley	
24 October	"Sometimes Love Just Ain't Enough"†	Patty Smyth and Don Henley	
31 October	"Sometimes Love Just Ain't Enough"†	Patty Smyth and Don Henley	
7 November	"Layla"	Eric Clapton	
14 November	"Walking on Broken Glass"	Annie Lennox	
21 November	"Song Instead of a Kiss"	Alannah Myles	
28 November	"Song Instead of a Kiss"	Alannah Myles	
5 December	"Song Instead of a Kiss"	Alannah Myles	
12 December	"Song Instead of a Kiss"	Alannah Myles	
19 December	"I Will Always Love You"	Whitney Houston	
26 December	"I Will Always Love You"	Whitney Houston	

== See also ==
- 1992 in music
- RPM number-one albums of 1992
