= Lover of Mine =

1990 single by Alannah Myles

Single by Alannah Myles

from the album Alannah Myles
- B-side: "Just One Kiss"
- Released: February 1990
- Length: 4:37
- Label: Atlantic
- Songwriters: Alannah Myles; Kit Johnson; Christopher Ward; David Tyson
- Producers: Christopher Ward; David Tyson

Alannah Myles singles chronology
| "Still Got This Thing" (1989) | "Lover of Mine" (1990) | "Song Instead of a Kiss" (1992) |

"Lover of Mine" is a song performed by Canadian singer Alannah Myles, released as the fourth (third in most territories) single from her debut self-titled album. It was the most successful single from the album in Myles' home country, reaching number two on the RPM 100 Singles chart. Myles recorded a new version of the song as a duet with Swedish artist Liny Wood, who had also covered the song on her own in 2012. The duet was released as a bonus track on the digital version of her 2014 album 85 BPM.

== Lyrics ==
The song is about a relationship that is endangered by cheating and infidelity on the man's part, while the woman has expressed her deep love and loyalty for him. The wandering eyes of the man towards other women is obvious to his partner. A breakup is never hinted at in the lyrics of the song.

== Release and reception ==
First released in her native Canada in February 1990, the song debuted on the chart on the same week her previous single, "Still Got This Thing", peaked at number 28. "Lover of Mine", which was released in Canada just as her song "Black Velvet" was released internationally and was becoming a massive worldwide hit, became her biggest hit in her homeland up to that point, peaking at number two in May 1990. The song also topped the Canadian Adult Contemporary charts for 4 weeks in March–April, Myles' first of two number-one adult contemporary hits in her home country. In the year-end charts, the song placed as the 16th biggest hit of that year in Canada.

In most territories "Lover of Mine" was the third single off the album instead of "Still Got This Thing", following "Love Is", except in Australia and New Zealand where they followed the Canadian single releases schedule and it was the fourth single. "Lover of Mine" was released internationally in the late Summer/early Autumn of 1990, charting in several countries, albeit in the lower regions of the charts. It was released in the US, but it failed to reach any Billboard chart.

== Music video ==
The music video, directed by Deborah Samuel, features Myles singing the song on a beach and on seacliffs surrounding it, as well as on fields. It was filmed in Ireland, on the areas of County Clare and The Burren.

== Track listings ==
Canada and Australia 7-inch single

1. "Lover of Mine" – 4:37
2. "Kick Start My Heart" – 2:57

European 12-inch and CD single

1. "Lover of Mine" – 4:37
2. "Just One Kiss" – 3:26
3. "Black Velvet" (edit) – 4:03

== Charts ==
=== Weekly charts ===
| Chart (1990) | Peak position |
|---|---|
| Australia (ARIA) | 47 |
| Belgium (Ultratop 50 Flanders) | 40 |
| Canada Top Singles (RPM) | 2 |
| Canada Adult Contemporary (RPM) | 1 |
| Netherlands (Single Top 100) | 61 |
| New Zealand (Recorded Music NZ) | 40 |
| UK Singles (Official Charts) | 78 |

=== Year-end charts ===
| Chart (1990) | Position |
|---|---|
| Canada Top Singles (RPM) | 16 |
| Canada Adult Contemporary (RPM) | 5 |

== Release history ==
| Region | Date | Format(s) | Label(s) | Ref. |
|---|---|---|---|---|
| Canada | February 1990 | —N/a | Atlantic | |
| Australia | July 2, 1990 | 7-inch vinyl; cassette | Atlantic | |
| United Kingdom | August 6, 1990 | 7-inch vinyl; 12-inch vinyl; CD; cassette | Atlantic | |
