= Black Velvet (Robin Lee album) =

Studio album by Robin Lee
- Released: 1990
- Recorded: 1989
- Studio: Scruggs, Nashville, TN
- Genre: Country
- Length: 34:42
- Label: Atlantic
- Producer: Nelson Larkin

Robin Lee chronology
This Old Flame (1988)	Black Velvet (1990)	Heart on a Chain (1991)

Black Velvet is a studio album by American country music artist Robin Lee, released in 1990. The album's title track is a cover of Alannah Myles' Number One single from 1989. Lee's cover peaked at No. 12 on the Billboard Hot Country Singles & Tracks chart.

== Critical reception ==
Professional ratings
Review scores
Source	Rating
Calgary Herald	C

The Washington Post panned "the selection of such bland, easy-listening ballads" and "Lee's polished but undistinguished voice." The Calgary Herald noted that Lee's "singing talent is just good enough to get her booked into better bowling alley lounges, but either she or her manager has figured the road to success is fast and easy when carbon copies of pop hits are cranked out and peddled as country."

== Track listing ==
No.	Title	Writer(s)	Length
1.	"Black Velvet"	Christopher Ward, David Tyson	4:43
2.	"How About Goodbye"	Thom Schuyler	3:05
3.	"He's Helping Me Get Over You"	Ava Aldridge, Cindy Walker	3:00
4.	"When the Feeling Comes Around"	Rick Cunha	3:30
5.	"Younger Love"	Sunny Russ	2:58
6.	"Love Letter"	Bonnie Hayes	3:56
7.	"Something I Know I'm Gonna Love"	Deborah Allen, Rafe Van Hoy, Eddie Struzick	3:45
8.	"Every Little Bit Hurts"	Walt Aldridge, Tom Brasfield	2:56
9.	"Till I Get It Right"	W. Aldridge, Lisa Angelle	3:09
10.	"Sad Eyes"	R. J. Pedrick	3:40

== Charts ==
=== Weekly charts ===
Chart (1990)	Peak position
US Top Country Albums (Billboard)	23

=== Year-end charts ===
Chart (1990)	Position
US Top Country Albums (Billboard)	71
