= Black Velvet =

Black Velvet may refer to:

== Music and entertainment ==
- The Black Velvets, an English rock band
- "Black Velvet" (song), a 1989 song by Alannah Myles
- "Black Velvet", a song by Ferry Corsten from the 2008 album Twice in a Blue Moon
- "Black Velvet", a song by Gass from the 1970 album Juju
- Black Velvet (Robin Lee album), 1990, featuring a cover of the song "Black Velvet"
- Black Velvet (O'Donel Levy album), 1971
- Black Velvet (revue), a revue at the London Hippodrome in 1939
- "Black Velvet", the former stage name taken by Charles Bradley when he performed as a James Brown impersonator
- Black Velvet (Charles Bradley album)
- Black Velvet (magazine), a British quarterly rock magazine
- Black Velvet or Schwarzer Samt, a 1964 German crime film
- "Don'cha Go 'Way Mad", a song originally recorded in 1949 as an instrumental called "Black Velvet"
- Black Velvet, Estonian band

== Beverages ==
- Black Velvet (whisky), a Canadian whiskey
- Black Velvet (beer cocktail), a mixed drink

== Other uses ==
- Black Velvet, a fabric
- Velvet painting, the application of paint onto velvet fabric
- Black Velvet Travel, which operates a bus company in Eastleigh, Southampton
