= War of the Worlds (1988 TV series) =

Science fiction television series

- Genre: Science fiction
- Created by: Greg Strangis
- Starring: Jared Martin; Lynda Mason Green; Philip Akin (season 1); Richard Chaves (season 1); Adrian Paul (season 2)
- Composers: Billy Thorpe (season 1); Fred Mollin (season 2)
- Countries of origin: Canada; United States
- No. of seasons: 2
- No. of episodes: 44

Production
- Production locations: Toronto, Ontario, Canada
- Running time: 45 minutes
- Production companies: Paramount Domestic Television; Ten Four Productions (season 1); Hometown Films (season 2); Triumph Entertainment

Original release
- Network: First-run syndication
- Release: October 7, 1988 – May 14, 1990

War of the Worlds is a science fiction television series that ran for two seasons, from October 7, 1988 to May 14, 1990. The series is a continuation of the 1953 film The War of the Worlds, a loose adaptation of the 1898 novel of the same title by H. G. Wells, using the same war machine designs and often incorporating aspects from the film, radio adaptation, and the original novel into its mythology.

Though the original film's producer, George Pal, envisioned a TV follow-up sometime in the 1970s, it was not until the late 1980s that a series was finally realized, this time by television producer Greg Strangis. The show was a part of the boom of first-run syndicated television series being produced at the time. It was later shown in reruns on the Sci Fi Channel.

The series was filmed in Toronto, Ontario, Canada.

== Premise ==
According to the series, rather than being killed outright by germs at the end of the 1953 film, the aliens had all slipped into a state of suspended animation. Their bodies were stored away in toxic waste drums and shipped to various disposal sites within the United States (ten such sites are known to exist in the country) and a widespread government cover-up combined with a condition dubbed “selective amnesia” has convinced most people that the invasion had never happened.

Although the original movie narration had explicitly stated that the aliens were Martians (even featuring artwork indicating an alien city on the planet Mars), since 1953 the concept of vastly intelligent life on Mars had lost plausibility. In the series, the aliens are revealed to actually be from Mor-Tax—a garden planet 40 light-years away in the Taurus constellation orbiting a dying sun.

Thirty-five years later, in 1988 (modern day when the series began), a terrorist group calling itself the People's Liberation Party accidentally irradiates the drums containing the aliens while raiding the dumpsite near Fort Jericho. The radiation destroys the bacteria that were keeping the aliens unconscious. Once free, the aliens take possession of the bodies of the six terrorists who overran the site. From there they use a series of human bodies and crudely adapted Earth technology to find means of appropriating the planet, both in removing humanity and developing a permanent means to inoculate themselves against the planet's indigenous bacteria. Their attempt to successfully make Earth into their new homeworld is imperative, for in roughly five years three million colonists from Mor-Tax are expected to arrive.

== Plot ==
=== First season ===
Opening narration (spoken in voice-over by Martin in character as Blackwood):

In 1953, Earth experienced a War of the Worlds. Common bacteria stopped the aliens, but it didn't kill them. Instead, the aliens lapsed into a state of deep hibernation. Now the aliens have been resurrected, more terrifying than ever before. In 1953, the aliens started taking over the world; today, they're taking over our bodies!

Along with other sci-fi/horror series that ran in syndication in the late 1980s (such as Friday the 13th: The Series and Freddy's Nightmares), War of the Worlds constantly pushed the “acceptable content” envelope, regularly featuring violence on par with the R-rated horror movies of the time. Gore is commonplace in the first season: dead aliens and their tossed-away hosts’ bodies melt in a grotesque puddle and the ruthless Mor-Taxans have no compunctions about torturing or mutilating any human who gets in their way. One of their trademark methods of murder would be gouged-out eyes courtesy of the third arm that would often burst out from their chest.

During the first season, the aliens are led by a triumvirate known as the Advocacy. They are a part of their society's ruling class, overseeing the invasion force on Earth while their leaders, the invisible and never heard Council, remain back on Mor-Tax. Outfitted throughout most of the season in contamination suits that pump coolant to counteract the killing heat of the radiation they need, they stay in their base of operation: a cavern in the Nevada desert, which is perfect due to the ambient radiation from atomic bomb tests. Due to the risks to their lives, they rarely venture into the outside world because without the Advocacy the lower classes would have no guidance and be useless.

Their goal is to pick up where they left off in 1953 by making way on Earth for the three million colonists heading in exodus from their dying world. Their major objective in order to accomplish this terraforming is to remove humanity from the planet. The aliens’ hatred of human beings goes beyond simple prejudice. Having come from a planet that can be compared to the Garden of Eden based on its description, the aliens see that humans do nothing but desecrate what they would call a paradise, and most importantly, a new home. Without humans in the way, they can restore the vegetation, and better replicate the conditions of their deceased world. To carry out a successful war, they seek out weapons (some of which are their own left behind from previous visitations), help amass their army, and engage in infiltration and all sorts of acts of warfare. But to make things more problematic, they must also find immunity against the germs that befell them in 1953.

The simplicity of the alien invasion storyline is countered in the first season by the addition of anomalous entities whose motives are only partially explained:

- Quinn: An alien trapped in a human host since the invasion of ’53, mysteriously immune to bacteria, and ready to play both of the major warring factions against each other for his own favor.
- The Qar’To: An unknown alien race represented by a synthetic lifeform sent to Earth, they want the Mor-Taxans dead and humanity preserved, but for sinister reasons.
- Project 9: A shadow government organization much like the Blackwood Project, but more interested in alien research than in resisting or countering the Mor-Taxan invasion plans.

A number of recurring allies are presented for the Blackwood team. Sylvia Van Buren (a character from the George Pal film reprised by the original actress, Ann Robinson), who was a colleague of Dr. Forrester, has since the end of the war developed the ability to sense the aliens and is prone to fairly accurate precognitive visions. The aliens’ scientific arsenal has little power over the supernatural powers of shaman Joseph Lonetree (whose presence is seemingly foreshadowed in the first episode). The team even makes friends with the remaining Grover's Mill militia of 1938 who had their own run-in with the aliens.

A recurring element in the series is the number three. This is an extension of the film, wherein the aliens’ physiology, technology and society are rooted in multiples of three: from their caste system (ruling class, soldiers, and scientists) to their bodies (three arms with three fingers), weaponry (in “The Resurrection”, they make bolas with three weighted ends), and even their mating cycle is every nine years (three times three years). The appearance of the number in some form is sprinkled throughout the season in reference to the aliens.

The episodes all had (often ironic) Biblical titles, such as "The Walls of Jericho", "To Heal the Leper", and "Among the Philistines".

“To Life Immortal” (too doe nakotae as it would be said in the aliens’ native tongue), a phrase by which the aliens seem to sum up their belief system, is a common exchange between aliens, as a pledge to their shared goal or as a battle cry before honorable self-sacrifice. It later became a popular catchphrase among the show's fans.

=== Second season ===
Opening voice-over:

There's rioting breaking out through the city. Fire is continuing to burn everywhere. Troops are shooting people. My God, I... I don't know why! There's a woman dying in front of me, and no one's helping her! There are conflicting reports about who or what started the chaos. Will someone tell me what's happening? This is madness! What is this world coming to?

— Off screen news reporter as the camera flies around a model night-time cityscape

The creative team of Season 1 was replaced, bringing in Frank Mancuso, Jr., who was also busy producing Friday the 13th: The Series. Many aspects of the show were retooled, such as the title sequence and music, and much of the black humor and Biblical references were removed. Norton and Ironhorse, two major characters from the first season, are killed off in the season premiere and replaced by mercenary John Kincaid (Adrian Paul).

The modern-day setting of the first season shifted to a not-too-distant future of "Almost Tomorrow" in which the world has since spiraled into a dismal state with its economy, environment, and government all beaten down. The antagonists of the first season are replaced by the Morthren, from Morthrai; while the first season aliens were said to be from the planet Mor-Tax, there is a half-hearted explanation for this change in the final episode. The Morthren exterminate all the aliens from the first season for their failure to eradicate humanity.

Whereas bacteria and radiation are constant problems for the aliens in the first season, the Morthren have quickly found a cure-all means for this by transmutating into human bodies. With this, they forwent the ability to possess human bodies, retaining only one human body. These bodies are, however, easily damaged; as seen in the series a single bullet wound is enough to cause the aliens' human form to break down, killing them. Their equivalent of body-swapping is a cloning machine that makes exact copies of someone, the only difference being the loyalty of the duplicates to the Morthren cause. Their continued existence is also linked to the original person being kept alive by the aliens, as Ironhorse fatally proves in the first episode of the season. Ironically, as sores are the telltale signs of alien possession in the first season, a lack of scars or any physical flaw was a telltale sign of a clone, as the Morthren are fixated with perfection. While the Eternal is their god, the Morthren are led by Malzor (played by Denis Forest, who had a large part in the Season 1 episode “Vengeance Is Mine”). Just under him was the scientist Mana (Catherine Disher, whose husband also played a major role in a Season 1 episode) with Ardix (Julian Richings who appeared briefly in “He Feedeth Among the Lillies”) as her assistant.

Meanwhile, with General Wilson missing, the Cottage destroyed, and two team members lost in battle, the remnants of the team, with mercenary Kincaid, seek shelter. They take up base in an underground hideout in the sewers. Some of the characters experience shifts, such as Harrison carrying a gun, becoming more sullen and losing his more quirky personality traits. The friction between the militaristic Ironhorse and the other team members was not transferred with Kincaid, who got along well with everyone, who themselves became more militaristic in season 2. The show's theme of warfare between two races, and all the issues that come with it, was replaced by a theme of a bleak life on a desolate world, but with possible hope for the future.

Although the series was canceled after 14 episodes had been broadcast, six more episodes were completed. This gave the production team the time and opportunity to create a finale, "The Obelisk", which offers a conclusive ending to the series as a whole.

== Cast ==
=== Main cast ===
An eclectic group is formed by the government to deal with the new alien threat, and the series follows their missions and adventures (and often failures) in fighting the aliens. The Blackwood Project, named after its central member, consists of the following:

- Dr. Harrison Blackwood (Jared Martin): Astrophysicist whose parents were killed in the 1953 invasion. He was adopted following the events of the film by Dr. Clayton Forrester and Blackwood's character is played very much to resemble Forrester down to his demeanor, dress, and even his speech and appearance. He is a pacifist and a vegetarian, and is often seen practicing many alternative health techniques such as yoga during the first season, but becomes grittier in the second.
- Dr. Suzanne McCullough (Lynda Mason Green): Microbiologist and single mother to Debi. She firmly embraces standard procedure in her work, which causes friction with Blackwood and his chaotic and eccentric work habits.
- Debi McCullough (Rachel Blanchard), Dr. McCullough daughter.
- Norton Drake (Philip Akin, season 1): A long-time friend of Harrison, he is a paraplegic computer genius who is granted mobility via a voice-activated wheelchair named Gertrude. He is often portrayed as being cool and laid back with a good sense of humor. In earlier episodes he had a pseudo-Caribbean accent; this was later dropped.
- Lt. Col. Paul Ironhorse (Richard Chaves, season 1): Lieutenant Colonel, Delta Force. He is career officer, a West Point graduate with 15 years of active duty prior to joining the team. Ironhorse is rather conservative and often clashes with the other members of the team, especially Blackwood who is his political and philosophical opposite.
- John Kincaid (Adrian Paul, season 2): Human resistance member
- Malzor (Denis Forest, season 2): Alien commander
- Mana (Catherine Disher, season 2): Alien scientist

=== Notable guest stars ===
The first season featured some recognisable actors in the series. Aside from getting Ann Robinson to reprise her role as Sylvia van Buren from the film, the series also obtained John Colicos (from Battlestar Galactica and Star Trek) as rogue alien Quinn who, while only appearing twice, was no doubt intended to play an integral part of the series as it went on (the character's power-hungry nature and middleman status between two worlds is noticeably reminiscent of Colicos’ role as Lord Baltar). The list of notable guests begins in the show's very start with John Vernon appearing in the first two episodes as General Wilson. Other guest stars throughout the series: Patrick Macnee, Greg Morris, Jeff Corey, John Ireland, Colm Feore, and James Hong.

The series was also the early working ground for future stars. Chris Potter made his acting debut in the second episode of season one. Singer Alannah Myles appears in the 20th episode of season one, which aired less than three weeks after the release of her platinum-certified eponymous debut album. Aside from exclusive season two star Adrian Paul (of Highlander fame), the second season also featured the first onscreen appearance of Mia Kirshner. The second season also gave more screentime to Rachel Blanchard, who only had minor play in the first season. Julian Richings also makes regular appearances as Ardix, an alien scientist working under Mana.

== Episodes ==
=== Season 1 (1988–89) ===
Note that three episodes ("The Walls of Jericho", "The Good Samaritan", and "Epiphany") are credited to pseudonyms based on the original film characters Clayton Forrester and Sylvia van Buren. These were the first three regular episodes produced, during the 1988 Writers Guild of America strike, and the writers (possibly including series creator Greg Strangis) went uncredited to avoid being charged with strikebreaking.

No. overall	No. in season	Title	Directed by	Written by	Original release date
1	1	"The Resurrection"	Colin Chilvers	Greg Strangis	October 7, 1988
2	2	"The Resurrection"	Colin Chilvers	Greg Strangis	October 7, 1988
In 1953, a worldwide alien invasion would have eliminated humanity had the extraterrestrial invaders not been vulnerable to the indigenous bacteria on the planet. Now an accident at a dumpsite revives the comatose aliens who then shortly attempt to resume the war they started 35 years ago.
3	3	"The Walls of Jericho"	Colin Chilvers	Forrest Van Buren	October 10, 1988
After a period without any further evidence of the aliens' existence, the powers-that-be try to shut down the Blackwood Project. Meanwhile, the aliens try desperately to find a way to combat the threat brought on by the radiation that is killing them.
4	4	"Thy Kingdom Come"	Winrich Kolbe	Herbert Wright	October 17, 1988
The aliens trek to Canada in order to free more of their sleeping brethren. The Blackwood Project's only hope in finding them lies in the scattered mind of War of the Worlds veteran Sylvia Van Buren.
5	5	"A Multitude of Idols"	Neill Fearnley	Tom Lazarus	October 24, 1988
The aliens move toward an operation that will begin integrating themselves into human society, thus developing agents to be active anywhere in the world.
6	6	"Eye for an Eye"	Mark Sobel	Tom Lazarus	October 31, 1988
As Grover's Mill celebrates the 50th anniversary of the radio drama that made it famous, little do they know what really happened that night in 1938, or that the "Martians" have returned.
7	7	"The Second Seal"	William Fruet	David Tynan	November 7, 1988
The aliens begin infiltrating a military base in hopes of possessing a list containing the location of 10,000 of their stored-away comrades.
8	8	"Goliath Is My Name"	George Bloomfield	Tom Lazarus	November 14, 1988
A fantasy game and reality collide for students when the aliens invade a campus to steal a lethal biological substance. Things become even worse when an alien is exposed to the toxin and becomes a mentally unstable rogue.
9	9	"To Heal the Leper"	William Fruet	David Tynan	November 21, 1988
The aliens are in jeopardy, as the Advocacy's collective counsel is crippled from the weakened state of one of the three. It seems that a dark cloud is lifting, but only Harrison believes they remain a threat.
10	10	"The Good Samaritan"	Paul Tucker	Sylvia Clayton	December 26, 1988
The aliens have produced a deadly toxin, and a miraculous new development to feed the world becomes their means of mass poisoning.
11	11	"Epiphany"	Neill Fearnley	Sylvia Van Buren	January 2, 1989
The aliens plan to provoke a nuclear war between the United States and the Soviet Union, taking advantage of humanity's own violent nature in order to speed along its inevitable self-destruction.
12	12	"Among the Philistines"	William Fruet	Patrick Berry	January 9, 1989
A set-up for the aliens by the Blackwood Project is soon spun on its head as an alien manages to infiltrate the Cottage.
13	13	"Choirs of Angels"	Herbert Wright	Durnford King	January 16, 1989
The aliens plant subliminal messages in a musician's recordings to brainwash a brilliant scientist into creating a cure for them against the bacteria on Earth.
14	14	"Dust to Dust"	George Bloomfield	Richard Krizemien	January 23, 1989
The theft of an Indian object provokes disgust from Ironhorse. But it also garners the aliens' interest, as it holds something that belongs to one of their ancient war machines.
15	15	"He Feedeth Among the Lilies"	George Bloomfield	Tom Lazarus	January 30, 1989
To better understand their problem, the aliens begin abducting humans to learn the secret of their immune systems.
16	16	"The Prodigal Son"	George McCowan	Teleplay by : Herbert Wright; Story by : Patrick Berry	February 6, 1989
In 1953, aliens invaded Earth, but were stopped when they fell to the planet's bacteria—except one. Now this rebellious rogue alien uses Blackwood's meeting with the United Nations to help his own plan for global domination.
17	17	"The Meek Shall Inherit"	William Fruet	D.C. Fontana	February 13, 1989
The aliens plan to have human society disorganized by paralyzing its means of communication.
18	18	"Unto Us a Child Is Born"	George Bloomfield	David Braff	February 20, 1989
After a pregnant woman is possessed by an alien and gives birth, the child becomes the focus of a search as it may offer an immunity to Earth's bacteria.
19	19	"The Last Supper"	George McCowan	George Lazarus	March 6, 1989
A secret meeting between countries is conducted in order to evaluate the global alien threat. However, the Advocacy learns of this grouping, and seize it as an opportunity to swiftly crush resistance.
20	20	"Vengeance Is Mine"	George Bloomfield	Arnold Margolin	April 17, 1989
Ironhorse must deal with a mistake that no soldier wants to make: the killing of an innocent civilian. Meanwhile, the aliens resort to robbery to acquire the rubies they need to power a new line of laser weapons.
21	21	"My Soul to Keep"	William Fruet	John Kubichan	April 24, 1989
The time to reproduce, and thus increase their army, has come for the aliens. But the offspring are endangered by radiation and the aliens take a risky move to ensure their future.
22	22	"So Shall Ye Reap"	George Bloomfield	Michael McKormack	May 1, 1989
The aliens infiltrate the illegal drug trade in order to circulate a narcotic that will turn humans into violent killers.
23	23	"The Raising of Lazarus"	Neill Fearnley	Durnford King	May 8, 1989
A strange alien pod is found and taken to a nuclear research facility. The Blackwood Project is summoned to investigate, but their authority is soon overridden by a mysterious Project 9.
24	24	"The Angel of Death"	Herbert Wright	Herbert Wright	May 15, 1989
After more than a year of being resisted by humans, the aliens are finally shaken by the arrival of a familiar enemy that has arrived on Earth. But is the enemy of our enemy our friend?

=== Season 2 (1989–90) ===
No. overall	No. in season	Title	Directed by	Written by	Original release date
25	1	"The Second Wave"	Francis Delia	Teleplay by : Michael Michalian & Jonathan Glassner; Story by : Michael Michalian	October 2, 1989
The Morthren, a new race of aliens from the planet Morthrai, eliminate the Mor-Taxans for their failure and take over the invasion.
26	2	"No Direction Home"	Mark Sobel	Teleplay by : Nolan Powers; Story by : Thomas Baum	October 9, 1989
After the destruction of the Cottage, the team finds a new base of operations to continue the fight against the Morthren.
27	3	"Doomsday"	Timothy Bond	Tony DiFranco	October 16, 1989
When a severe heat wave strikes, the aliens cut off the city's water supply and exploit a local Reverend to drive humans into worshipping the Morthren Eternal.
28	4	"Terminal Rock"	Gabriel Pelletier	John Groves	October 23, 1989
The aliens replace the leader of a punk rock band with a clone, in order to incite humans into killing each other through music.
29	5	"Breeding Ground"	Armand Mastroianni	Alan Moskowitz	October 30, 1989
Harrison goes to the Metro Hospital for medical supplies, and discovers that an old friend of his is being forced to implant alien embryos in human hosts. Ultimately, a human/alien hybrid baby is born and successfully acquired by the Morthren.
30	6	"Seft of Emun"	William Fruet	J.K.E. Rose	November 6, 1989
With their power supply running low, the Morthren revive a high priestess from another world they destroyed, who is able to convert raw materials into energy-generating crystals. She psychically contacts Harrison, urging Blackwood to save her and her son from the Morthren.
31	7	"Loving the Alien"	Otta Hanus	Janet MacLean	November 13, 1989
Tired of hiding underground, Debi McCullough sneaks into the outside world and forms a bond with Ceeto, a rebellious young alien.
32	8	"Night Moves"	Mark Sobel	Lorne Rossman	November 20, 1989
Suzanne and Debi attempt to move to a country farm owned by Suzanne's mother, only to find that the Morthren are using it to incubate alien crops.
33	9	"Synthetic Love"	Francis Delia	Nancy Ann Miller	January 15, 1990
The aliens develop a new drug made from human brain tissue, planning to use it to control human society.
34	10	"The Defector"	Armand Mastroianni	Sandra Berg & Judith Berg	January 22, 1990
When an alien weapon intended to kill humans via computer systems backfires, its creator, Kemo, is maimed in the process and then sentenced to death for his incompetence. Having developed human emotions as a result of his accident, Kemo teams with Kincaid to destroy the weapon.
35	11	"Time to Reap"	Joseph L. Scanlan	Jim Trombetta	January 29, 1990
A rare planetary alignment allows the aliens to create a time portal. Blackwood must stop them from immunizing the Mor-Taxan invaders in 1953.
36	12	"The Pied Piper"	Allan Eastman	Alan Moskowitz	February 5, 1990
The human-alien hybrid boy, Adam, is sent to infiltrate the Creche, a human institution where children with "superior" abilities are genetically engineered. Suzanne forms a bond with Adam and hopes to dissuade him from bringing the other children into the Eternal's grasp.
37	13	"The Deadliest Disease"	William Fruet	Teleplay by : Carl Binder; Story by : William Coneybeare	February 12, 1990
Threatened by Earth's bacteria yet again, the aliens decide to attain a tissue-repairing med-cell. When it is stolen and ends up on the black market, both the aliens and Blackwood provoke a violent gang war.
38	14	"Path of Lies"	Allan Eastman	Teleplay by : Rick Schwartz & Nancy Ann Miller; Story by : Rick Schwartz	February 19, 1990
A newspaper reporter, Marc Traynor, attains photographic evidence of the aliens, and only Blackwood can protect him from termination.
39	15	"Candle in the Night"	Armand Mastroianni	Carl Binder	April 9, 1990
Blackwood diverts his efforts into giving Debi the best birthday possible, while the aliens deal with a runaway probe.
40	16	"Video Messiah"	Gabrielle Pelletier	Norman Snider	April 16, 1990
The aliens infiltrate an advertising agency, planning to brainwash humans via subliminal messages in TV commercials.
41	17	"Totally Real"	William Fruet	Jim Trombetta	April 23, 1990
Debi is caught up in a fight simulation developed by the aliens to study human creativity.
42	18	"Max"	Jorge Montesi	Naomi Janzen	April 30, 1990
Kincaid's dead brother is revived by the aliens as a deadly cyborg and sent to crush Blackwood and the underground military resistance.
43	19	"The True Believer"	Armand Mastroianni	Jim Henshaw	May 7, 1990
The aliens are running low on resources, and Malzor attempts to maintain his standing with the Eternal by turning the human authorities against Blackwood.
44	20	"The Obelisk"	William Fruet	Rick Schwartz & Nancy Ann Miller	May 14, 1990
Malzor plans to release deadly Telesian spores in a desperate last bid to destroy all life on Earth. However, Debi's alien friend Ceeto steals an obelisk containing shocking secrets that bring the war to an unexpected conclusion.

== Releases ==
=== Novelization ===
A novelization of the pilot episode was written by J. M. Dillard. While following the same narrative structure of the episode, the book contains characters from the 1953 film and scenes not included in the final cut of the pilot; it also explores more deeply the aliens' political motivations, and emphasizes denial instead of the "selective amnesia" aspect of the plot.

=== Home media ===
On November 1, 2005, Paramount Home Media Distribution released season 1 on DVD in Region 1. The set's release coincided with the DVD re-release of the 1953 film from which the show was spawned (the updated version from Steven Spielberg being released on DVD later the same month). A common criticism of the DVDs has been the poor image quality; fans in particular also point out the omission of the alien hand animation from the opening credits that had been inexplicably removed from every episode. The set contains no special features. It does, however, allow the viewer to jump to a chapter, which are divided by act, including the opening and closing credits, but are not available via any menu. It also includes closed captioning, but these may not be entirely reliable as there are several clear errors - for example, it is inconsistent in how it spells the name of the aliens' homeworld, neither of which is the canonical spelling. By contrast, however, in a few episodes, the captioning refers to the Advocates by the name of their original host bodies from the pilot episode (i.e. Chambers, Urick, and Einhorn), even in the absence of the original actors.

The second and final season was released on October 26, 2010, nearly five years after the release of the first season.

In Region 2, Revelation Films has released both seasons on DVD in the UK. Season 1 was released on April 30, 2012 and Season 2 was released on August 30, 2012.

On February 6, 2018, CBS Home Entertainment and Paramount Home Media Distribution released seasons 1 and 2 as a single package entitled War of the Worlds: The Complete Series on DVD.
