= Long Long Time =

Single by Linda Ronstadt

from the album Silk Purse
- B-side: "Nobody's"
- Released: June 1970
- Genre: Folk rock
- Length: 2:59 (single edit); 4:18 (album version)
- Label: Capitol
- Songwriter: Gary White
- Producer: Elliot Mazer

Linda Ronstadt singles chronology
"Will You Love Me Tomorrow" (1970)	"Long Long Time" (1970)	"(She's a) Very Lovely Woman" (1971)

"Long Long Time" is a song written by Gary White which became a hit for Linda Ronstadt in 1970. "Long Long Time" is about a lasting love for someone who did not last as a lover.

== Linda Ronstadt version ==
In 1970, Linda Ronstadt released the song as a single and on the album Silk Purse. The single spent 12 weeks on the Billboard Hot 100 chart, peaking at No. 25, while reaching No. 15 on Canada's "RPM 100" (her first single there), No. 8 on Canada's CHUM 30 chart, and No. 20 on Billboard's Easy Listening chart.

In 1971, Ronstadt was nominated for a Grammy Award for Best Contemporary Female Vocal Performance for her rendition of "Long Long Time".

=== Chart performance ===
Chart (1970)	Peak position
Canada - RPM 100	15
Canada - CHUM 30	8
U.S. Billboard Hot 100	25
U.S. Billboard Easy Listening	20
U.S. Cash Box Top 100	26
U.S. Record World 100 Top Pops	21
U.S. Record World Top Non-Rock	12

== Cover versions ==
- In 1973, Harry Belafonte recorded the song as a duet with vocalist Eloise Laws for his album "Play Me".
- In 1974, Cliff Richard recorded the song for his album "The 31st of February Street".
- In 1976, Larry Santos released a cover of the song, which reached No. 38 on Billboard's Easy Listening chart and No. 109 on Billboard's "Bubbling Under the Hot 100".
- Country singer Mindy McCready recorded the song for her 1997 album "If I Don't Stay the Night".
- In 1998 Canadian singer Alannah Myles covered the song as one of two new recordings for her Greatest Hits album The Very Best Of Alannah Myles.

== In popular culture ==
- The song is played during the third episode (which shares the name with the song but adds a comma to the episode title that the song release does not contain) of the 2023 television series The Last of Us, serving as a motif for the relationship between Bill and Frank. After the episode was broadcast, Spotify announced that streams of the song increased by 4,900% over the previous week; several outlets compared it to the 2022 resurgence of Kate Bush's "Running Up That Hill" after its use in the fourth season of Stranger Things. In the period after the episode was broadcast, the song topped three separate Billboard charts, more than 50 years after its release, placing at No. 1 on the Rock Digital Song Sales ranking dated February 11, 2023.
- The song also features in a scene from the 2024 comedy road movie Drive-Away Dolls.
