= Catch Up (Canadian TV series) =

Canadian children's television series

Catch Up is a children's television series that aired on CBC Television in Canada during the 1978–1979 season.

Although the series did not continue past its first year, its hosts would proceed to national careers:

- Margot Pinvidic continued acting on various movie and television productions.
- Catch Up's music segments were performed by the Christopher Ward Band, whose namesake would become one of MuchMusic's first VJs. Ward also became a songwriter for Alannah Myles and other artists.
