= Selective memory =

Selective memory can mean any of the following:

- Selective omission, the tendency to taboo some elements of a collective memory
- Confirmation bias, the tendency to search for, interpret, favor, and recall information in a way that confirms one's preexisting beliefs or hypotheses.
- Lacunar amnesia, the loss of memory about one specific event.
- Selective amnesia, the loss of memory about certain things.
