= Robin Lee (singer) =

American singer-songwriter

- Also known as: Robin Lee Bruce
- Born: Robin Lee Irwin; November 7, 1963 (age 62); Nashville, TN
- Origin: Nashville, Tennessee, U.S.
- Genres: Country
- Occupation: Singer-songwriter
- Instrument: Vocals
- Years active: 1982-present
- Labels: Evergreen; Atlantic
- Spouse: Trey Bruce (divorced)

Robin Lee (née Robin Lee Irwin, born November 7, 1963) is an American country music artist. She recorded in the 1980s and 1990s as Robin Lee for Evergreen and Atlantic Records, charting at number 12 on Hot Country Songs in 1990 with "Black Velvet". After charting her last single in 1994, she began working as a songwriter for other artists.

== Biography ==
Lee's musical interests began in high school, when she would perform at school dances and talent competitions. She later recorded demos for publishing companies, and by 1982, she made her debut on the U.S. Billboard Hot Country Singles & Tracks charts with "Turning Back the Covers (Don't Turn Back the Time)". She charted several more singles throughout the 1980s, but only scraped into the country top 40 once during the decade, with 1986's "I'll Take Your Love Anytime" (which peaked at #37). In 1990, her cover of Alannah Myles' "Black Velvet" peaked at #12 on the country charts, but follow-up singles were not successful, and Lee's career as a recording artist had come to a close by 1994.

Lee has since signed as a songwriter to Chrysalis Music, and has written album cuts for LeAnn Rimes and Jo Dee Messina, as well as single for Lila McCann ("With You"), Tracy Lawrence ("Lonely"), The Clark Family Experience ("Standin' Still"), Katrina Elam ("No End in Sight"), Roxie Dean ("Everyday Girl"), Crystal Shawanda ("My Roots Are Showing"), and Reba McEntire ("While You Were Sleeping").

She was formerly married to songwriter Trey Bruce, son of singer-songwriter Ed Bruce.

== Discography ==
=== Albums ===
| Title | Album details | Peak positions |
| Title | Album details | US Country |
|---|---|---|
| Robin Lee | Release date: March 1986; Label: Evergreen Records; Format: LP, cassette | 57 |
| This Old Flame | Release date: 1988; Label: Atlantic America; Format: CD, LP, cassette | — |
| Black Velvet | Release date: March 20, 1990; Label: Atlantic Records; Format: CD, cassette | 23 |
| Heart on a Chain | Release date: June 25, 1991; Label: Atlantic Records; Format: CD, cassette | — |
| The Best of Robin Lee | Release date: September 19, 2000; Label: Atlantic Records; Format: CD, cassette | — |
"—" denotes releases that did not chart

=== Singles ===
| Year | Single | Peak positions | | Album |
| Year | Single | US Country | CAN Country | Album |
|---|---|---|---|---|
| 1983 | "Turning Back the Covers (Don't Turn Back the Time)" | 87 | — | —N/a |
| 1983 | "Heart for a Heart" | 81 | — | —N/a |
| 1984 | "Angel in Your Arms" | 54 | — | —N/a |
| 1984 | "Want Ads" | 63 | — | —N/a |
| 1984 | "Cold in July" | 62 | — | —N/a |
| 1984 | "I Heard It on the Radio" | 71 | — | —N/a |
| 1985 | "Paint the Town Blue" (with Lobo) | 49 | — | —N/a |
| 1985 | "Safe in the Arms of Love" | 44 | — | Robin Lee |
| 1986 | "I'll Take Your Love Anytime" | 37 | — | Robin Lee |
| 1986 | "If You're Anything Like Your Eyes" | 48 | — | Robin Lee |
| 1988 | "This Old Flame" | 52 | — | This Old Flame |
| 1988 | "Shine a Light on a Lie" | 56 | — | This Old Flame |
| 1988 | "Before You Cheat on Me Once (You Better Think Twice)" | 51 | — | This Old Flame |
| 1990 | "Black Velvet" | 12 | 21 | Black Velvet |
| 1990 | "How About Goodbye" | 70 | — | Black Velvet |
| 1990 | "Love Letter" | 67 | 86 | Black Velvet |
| 1991 | "Nothin' But You" | 51 | 77 | Heart on a Chain |
| 1991 | "Back to Bein' Blue" | — | — | Heart on a Chain |
| 1994 | "When Love Comes Callin'" | 71 | — | —N/a |
"—" denotes releases that did not chart

=== Music videos ===
| Year | Video | Director |
|---|---|---|
| 1988 | "Shine a Light on a Lie" | John Lloyd Miller |
| 1990 | "Black Velvet" | Richard Jernigan |
| 1990 | "Love Letter" | Richard Jernigan |
| 1991 | "Nothin' But You" | —N/a |

== Awards and nominations ==
| Year | Organization | Award | Nominee/Work | Result |
|---|---|---|---|---|
| 1986 | Academy of Country Music Awards | Top New Female Vocalist | Robin Lee | Nominated |
