= A-lan-nah =

Studio album by Alannah Myles
- Released: August 15, 1995
- Studio: Metalworks Studios (Mississauga, Ontario)
- Genres: Pop rock; blues rock
- Length: 49:41
- Label: Atlantic
- Producer: Pat Moran

Alannah Myles chronology
Rockinghorse (1992)	A-lan-nah (1995)	A Rival (1997)

Professional ratings
Review scores
Source	Rating
AllMusic	3/5 stars

A-lan-nah is the third studio album by Canadian singer Alannah Myles. It was in released in 1995 on Atlantic Records. Miles Copeland was credited as the executive producer.

== Track listing ==
No.	Title	Writer(s)	Length
1.	"Mistress of Erzulie"	Alannah Myles; Phil Johnstone	4:49
2.	"Blow Wind Blow"	Myles; Christopher Ward	4:19
3.	"Family Secret"	Ward; David Tyson	5:19
4.	"Mother Nature"	Myles; Johnstone; Kurt Schefter	4:05
5.	"Irish Rain"	Ward	4:23
6.	"Dark Side of Me"	Myles; Pat MacDonald; Rich Wayland	3:43
7.	"Simple Man's Dream"	Myles; Kevin Savigar; Gary Nicholson	4:31
8.	"Lightning in a Bottle"	Myles; Ward; Tyson	4:33
9.	"Keeper of My Heart"	Myles; Schefter; Johnstone	3:55
10.	"Do You Really Wanna Know Me"	Myles; Nancy Simmonds; Cyril Rawson	2:35
11.	"Everybody's Breaking Up"	MacDonald	4:40
12.	"Sally Go 'Round the Roses"	Abner Spector	2:49
Total length:			49:41

== Personnel ==
- Alannah Myles – vocals
- Phil Parlapiano – acoustic piano (1, 4), Wurlitzer electric piano (1, 6), organ (1–3, 5–7, 10), accordion (2, 4, 5, 7, 9–12), mandolin (2), Rhodes electric piano (3), Mellotron (4, 8, 11), keyboards (5), acoustic guitar (8), pump organ (12)
- Kurt Schefter – electric guitars (1–7, 11), backing vocals (1, 2, 9), acoustic guitar (2, 4, 7–10), slide guitar (2)
- David Wipper – acoustic guitar (1–3, 5–9, 11), mandolin (4, 8, 9), banjo (9)
- Armand Sabal-Lecco – bass (1–9, 11)
- Jørn Andersen – drums, backing vocals (1, 2, 9), spoons (4)
- Ray Caldwell – bodhrán (5), tin whistle (5), low whistle (12), Uilleann pipes (12)
- Hugh Marsh – violin (4, 5, 8)
- George Koller – cello (8, 10)
- Jackie Richardson – backing vocals (1, 6, 7)
- Vivienne Williams – backing vocals (1, 7)

== Production ==
- Miles Copeland III – executive producer
- Pat Moran – producer, engineer, mixing
- Ed Krautner – engineer
- Peter Lee – engineer
- Brad Nelson – engineer
- L. Stu Young – engineer
- Paul Offenbacher – engineer
- Luis Quine – assistant engineer
- Andora Studios (Los Angeles, California, USA) – mixing location
- Kit Mitchell – studio manager
- Stephen Marcussen – mastering at Precision Mastering (Hollywood, California, USA)
- Peter Stoynich – production coordinator
- Thomas Bricker – art direction
- Amanda Kavanagh – design
- Deborah Samuel – photography
- Helen Chudoba – hair stylist
- Chris Martin – stylist
- Lisa Panagapka – wardrobe
- Rena Andreoli – make-up
- Feary Bina – color
- Olivia – jewelry
- Firstars, Inc. – management
