= List of Canadian number-one albums of 1992 =

These are the Canadian number-one albums of 1992. The chart was compiled and published by RPM every Saturday.

Issue date	Album	Artist
January 11	Achtung Baby	U2
January 18	Waking Up the Neighbours	Bryan Adams
January 25	Waking Up the Neighbours	Bryan Adams
February 1	Waking Up the Neighbours	Bryan Adams
February 8	Waking Up the Neighbours	Bryan Adams
February 15	Waking Up the Neighbours	Bryan Adams
February 22	Nevermind	Nirvana
February 29	Waking Up the Neighbours	Bryan Adams
March 7	Nevermind	Nirvana
March 14	Waking Up the Neighbours	Bryan Adams
March 21	Waking Up the Neighbours	Bryan Adams
March 28	Waking Up the Neighbours	Bryan Adams
April 4	Wayne's World	Soundtrack
April 11	Wayne's World	Soundtrack
April 18	Adrenalize	Def Leppard
April 25	Adrenalize	Def Leppard
May 2	Adrenalize	Def Leppard
May 9	Adrenalize	Def Leppard
May 16	Classic Queen	Queen
May 23	Classic Queen	Queen
May 30	Classic Queen	Queen
June 6	Classic Queen	Queen
June 13	Classic Queen	Queen
June 20	Classic Queen	Queen
June 27	Classic Queen	Queen
July 4	Classic Queen	Queen
July 11	Classic Queen	Queen
July 18	Classic Queen	Queen
July 25	Blood Sugar Sex Magik	Red Hot Chili Peppers
August 1	Some Gave All	Billy Ray Cyrus
August 8	Some Gave All	Billy Ray Cyrus
August 15	Some Gave All	Billy Ray Cyrus
August 22	Gordon	Barenaked Ladies
August 29	Gordon	Barenaked Ladies
September 5	Gordon	Barenaked Ladies
September 12	Gordon	Barenaked Ladies
September 19	Gordon	Barenaked Ladies
September 26	Gordon	Barenaked Ladies
October 3	Gordon	Barenaked Ladies
October 10	Dance Mix '92	Various artists
October 17	Dance Mix '92	Various artists
October 24	Unplugged	Eric Clapton
October 31	Unplugged	Eric Clapton
November 7	Fully Completely	The Tragically Hip
November 14	Unplugged	Eric Clapton
November 21	Unplugged	Eric Clapton
November 28	Unplugged	Eric Clapton
December 5	Unplugged	Eric Clapton
December 12	Unplugged	Eric Clapton
December 19	The Bodyguard	Soundtrack
December 26	The Bodyguard	Soundtrack

== See also ==
- List of Canadian number-one singles of 1992
