= Rockinghorse =

Studio album by Alannah Myles
- Released: October 13, 1992
- Studios: Brooklyn Recording (New York City) Saturn Sound (Studio City, California) Mad Dog Studios (Burbank, California) The Complex, Westlake Studios and Image Recording Studios (Los Angeles, California) Capitol Studios and A&M Studios (Hollywood, California)
- Genre: Rock
- Length: 50:10
- Label: Atlantic
- Producer: David Tyson

Alannah Myles chronology
Alannah Myles (1989)	Rockinghorse (1992)	A-lan-nah (1995)

Singles from Alannah Myles
- 1. "Song Instead of a Kiss" Released: October 13, 1992

Professional ratings
Review scores
Source	Rating
AllMusic	2.5/5 stars
Entertainment Weekly	B
Orlando Sentinel	1/3 stars

Rockinghorse is the second studio album by Canadian singer-songwriter Alannah Myles, released on October 13, 1992, by Atlantic Records. It spawned three singles and two songs that weren't released as singles, but charted on RPM Top Singles Chart, "Song Instead of a Kiss", "Tumbleweed", "Our World, Our Times", "Living on a Memory", and "Sonny Say You Will" (the first one of which Myles co-wrote). The album was nominated for Best Rock Vocal Performance, Female at the 35th Annual Grammy Awards.

== Track listing ==
No.	Title	Writer(s)	Length
1.	"Our World Our Times"	Christopher Ward; David Tyson	6:25
2.	"Make Me Happy"	Ward; Tyson	5:47
3.	"Sonny Say You Will"	Ward	5:04
4.	"Tumbleweed"	Ward	4:36
5.	"Livin' on a Memory"	Ward; Tyson	5:50
6.	"Song Instead of a Kiss"	Alannah Myles; Robert Priest; Nancy Simmonds	5:03
7.	"Love in the Big Town"	Ward; Tyson	4:45
8.	"The Last Time I Saw William"	Myles; Ward; Tyson	4:12
9.	"Lies and Rumours"	Ward; Tyson	5:06
10.	"Rockinghorse"	Myles; Simmonds; Ward	3:00

== Personnel ==
Musicians

- Alannah Myles – vocals
- David Tyson – keyboards, bass, backing vocals
- Kurt Schefter – guitars
- David Wipper – acoustic guitars, mandolin
- Buzz Feiten – electric guitars (5)
- Will Lee – bass
- Denny Fongheiser – drums, percussion
- Jørn Andersen – additional cymbals (1)
- Larry Williams – saxophones
- Greg Smith – baritone saxophone (2, 4)
- Gary Grant – trumpets
- John Elefante – backing vocals
- Mark Free – backing vocals
- Tommy Funderburk – backing vocals
- Christopher Ward – backing vocals
- Rose Stone – backing vocals

Production

- Christopher Ward – executive producer
- David Tyson – producer
- Brian Foraker – engineer, mixing (6, 10)
- Tom Lord-Alge – mixing (1-5, 7-9)
- Brad Aldredge – additional engineer, assistant engineer
- Richard Benoit – additional engineer
- Bill Dooley – additional engineer
- Peter Willis – additional engineer
- Peter Doell – assistant engineer
- Jeff Graham – assistant engineer
- Efren Herrera – assistant engineer
- Leslie Ann Kones – assistant engineer
- Dominique Schafer – assistant engineer
- Scott Stillman – assistant engineer
- Ben Wallach – assistant engineer
- Stephen Marcussen – mastering at Precision Mastering (Hollywood, California)
- Shari Sutcliffe – production coordinator
- Reisig & Taylor – cover photography
- Alannah Myles – creative director, wardrobe design
- Tom Bricker – art direction, design
- Melanie Nissen – creative director for Atlantic Records
- Lisa Panagapka for Alannahworks – creative design
- Michael Bonneville – make-up
- Helen Chudoba – hair design
- Borman Entertainment – management

== Charts ==
=== Weekly charts ===
Weekly chart performance for Rockinghorse
Chart (1992)	Peak position
Australian Albums (ARIA)	65
Austrian Albums (Ö3 Austria)	40
Canada Top Albums/CDs (RPM)	9
Danish Albums (Hitlisten)	9
European Albums (Music & Media)	58
Finnish Albums (Suomen virallinen lista)	19
German Albums (Offizielle Top 100)	53
Swedish Albums (Sverigetopplistan)	23
Swiss Albums (Schweizer Hitparade)	16

=== Year-end charts ===
Year-end chart performance for Rockinghorse
Chart (1992)	Position
Canada Top Albums/CDs (RPM)	37

== Certifications ==
Certifications for Rockinghorse
Region	Certification	Certified units/sales
Canada (Music Canada)	2× Platinum	200,000^{^}
^{^} Shipments figures based on certification alone.
