= City Limits (TV series) =

Canadian television series

City Limits is a Canadian television series, which aired on Citytv and later MuchMusic in the 1980s and 1990s.

The program premiered on CITY-TV in 1983, as an overnight series on Friday and Saturday nights. Hosted by Christopher Ward, the series originally featured a cross-genre mix of interviews, music news, comedy sketches and music videos, and was essentially the prototype for MuchMusic's overall format. During this era, Mike Myers made several appearances on the program as Wayne Campbell, the character he would later take to Saturday Night Live in the Wayne's World sketches.

After MuchMusic debuted in 1984, the program initially continued as a daily magazine series on the network, but soon became a weekly series with its daily mandate taken over by Rockflash. As a weekly series, its focus shifted more toward alternative music and experimental programming, and its timeslot shifted first to Sunday afternoons and later back to Fridays at midnight. With this programming shift, Ward left the show and it was then hosted by Kim Clarke Champniss, and finally by Simon Evans. In 1990, the program devoted a special episode to the annual CASBY Awards ceremony. In 1991, MuchMusic's programming committee determined that the program's late-night timeslot made it acceptable for the program to play Mitsou's video for "Dis-moi, dis-moi", which had otherwise been banned from rotation on the network as it featured considerable nudity, although as a mainstream pop song incompatible with the show's format the program never played it.

In 1992, MuchMusic introduced the daily alternative rock series The Wedge. At this time City Limits shifted its focus further, with The Wedge playing the most popular alternative rock hits while City Limits played more underground and independent videos. The program was cancelled in 1995, soon after Evans moved into a production role with the network and ceased appearing as an on-air host.
