= Circus Maximus (American band) =

American band

Circus Maximus was an American band in the late 1960s, which combined influences from folk music, rock, and jazz into a form of psychedelic rock.

== History ==
The band, originally called the Lost Sea Dreamers, was formed in 1967 by Bob Bruno and Jerry Jeff Walker. Vanguard Records insisted on a name change, as the initials "LSD" were considered too linked to the drug culture. Bruno's song "Wind", from the band's self-titled first album, became a minor hit in the United States, particularly through airplay on "progressive" FM radio stations. The song received critical acclaim, with one reviewer calling it "pure joy..." and praising the group as "superlative," and another critic saying the song was "particularly absorbing, a classic in mood, time and place."

In late December 1967, the band performed in an unusual pair of "Electric Christmas" concerts together with New York Pro Musica, an ensemble that performed early music. There were two 80-minute performances. The material performed included a reworking of 14th-century composer Guillaume de Machaut's "La douce dame jolie" as an English-language song "Sweet Lovely Lady" arranged by Robert M. Bruno for the ensemble, and Bruno original "Chess Game" that, unbeknownst to Bruno but noted by John White, director of the Pro Musica, strongly echoed the "Romanesca", a piece that first appears in 16th-century Spanish lute books.

The concert was not a critical success. Donal Henahan, writing in The New York Times, said that it "fell somewhat short of being the total-environmental trip that was promised… the night summed up most of the esthetic ideas now in the air: incongruity, simultaneity, games theory, the put-on, the parody, the Trip… and the effort to create a 'Total Environment' in which all the senses can come into play." Henahan asserted that the concert's commercial success showed a breakdown in the separation of classical and popular audiences.

Bruno's interest in jazz apparently diverged from Walker's interest in folk music, and by July 1968 the band had broken up and Walker was appearing at the Bitter End in Greenwich Village, sharing a bill with Joni Mitchell. Bassist Gary White went on to write Linda Ronstadt's first solo hit, "Long, Long Time." By 1972 Bruno was appearing with Noah Howard's groups which included several appearances at the NY Free Jazz Festival. He is on the recording called Noah Howard Live at the Village Vanguard with Noah Howard, Frank Lowe, Earl Freeman, Juma Sultan, and Rashied Ali (Freedom Records, re-released on Iron Man in 2004 as a CD). Robert Shelton included the Circus Maximus album Neverland Revisited in a November 1968 list selected to represent "the breadth… of today's rock".

== Members ==
- Jerry Jeff Walker, rhythm guitar and vocal (credited on some copies of the first album as "Jerry Walker"; died October 23, 2020)
- Bob Bruno, lead guitar, organ, piano, vocal
- David Scherstrom, drums (born June 28, 1946; died February 1, 2017)
- Gary White, bass
- Peter Troutner, vocal and tambourine; also some guitar work (died January 11, 2008)

== Albums ==
- Circus Maximus, Circus Maximus, Vanguard VRS-9260 (mono) and VSD-79260 (stereo) (1967)
  1. "Travelin' Around" (Bob Bruno)
  2. "Lost Sea Shanty" (Jerry Jeff Walker)
  3. "Oops, I Can Dance" (Walker)
  4. "You Know I've Got The Rest Of My Life To Go" (Bruno)
  5. "Bright Light Lover" (Bruno)
  6. "Chess Game" (Bruno)
  7. "People's Games" (Walker)
  8. "Time Waits" (Bruno)
  9. "Fading Lady" (Walker)
  10. "Short-Haired Fathers" (Bruno)
  11. "Wind" (Bruno)
- Circus Maximus, Neverland Revisited, Vanguard VSD-79274 (1968)
  1. "Hello Baby" (Bob Bruno)
  2. "How's Your Sky, Straight Guy Spy" (Bruno)
  3. "Come Outside, Believe In It" (Jerry Jeff Walker)
  4. "Parallel" (Bruno)
  5. "Trying To Live Right" (Walker)
  6. "Lonely Man" (Bruno)
  7. "Mixtures" (Walker)
  8. "Negative Dreamer Girl" (Walker)
  9. "Neverland" (Bruno)
  10. "Neverland Revisited" (Bruno)
  11. "Hansel and Gretel" (Walker)
