= Song Instead of a Kiss =

1992 single by Alannah Myles

Single by Alannah Myles

from the album Rockinghorse
- B-side: "Rockinghorse"
- Released: 18 October 1992
- Genre: Rock
- Length: 5:04 (LP version); 3:57 (edit)
- Label: Atlantic
- Songwriters: Alannah Myles; Robert Priest; Nancy Simmonds
- Producer: David Tyson

Alannah Myles singles chronology
"Lover of Mine" (1990)	"Song Instead of a Kiss" (1992)	"Our World Our Times" (1993)

Music video
- "Song Instead of a Kiss" on YouTube

"Song Instead of a Kiss" is a song by Canadian singer-songwriter Alannah Myles, released in October 1992 by Atlantic Records as the first single from her second album, Rockinghorse (1992). The power ballad was produced by David Tyson and became Myles' first and only number-one single in Canada, topping the RPM 100 Hit Tracks chart for four weeks and ending 1992 as Canada's third-most-successful single. It also became a top-20 hit in Finland but charted weakly in other countries. The accompanying music video was directed by Paul Boyd and filmed in Hollywood, California. In 1994, the song received a SOCAN award in Canada.

== Background ==
The song was co-written by Myles, songwriting partner Nancy Simmonds, and noted Canadian poet Robert Priest. The song's lyrics were a poem by Priest that he had sent to Simmonds, a friend of his and through whom he had met Myles. Simmonds and Myles were in Barbados writing Myles' second album, and after days struggling to write, Simmonds showed Myles the poem and, liking it, she immediately sang the melody over it, which Simmonds duly noted with her guitar. Myles had just finished a romantic relationship with Robert Plant and felt the lyrics expressed her feelings and pain about the split.

Atlantic Records were not pleased with the demo they presented them, but Myles and her producer David Tyson decided to carry on working on it nonetheless. Tyson arranged the song, including the notable minute-and-a-half intro of the song (which was edited out on the single edit), after which Myles cut the final vocals. When they presented the reworked track to Atlantic, they loved it, and, unbeknownst to Myles, sent it to Plant to see if he could duet with her on the song, a move she was furious about. Myles has cited that it is one of her favourite songs from her catalogue.

== Release and reception ==
The song was chosen as the lead single from the Rockinghorse album. While Myles liked the song and found it single-worthy, she was adamant about releasing the uptempo rocker "Our World, Our Times" instead of a ballad as the first single, but was overruled by the record company because they feared the political lyrics of that song would hurt its airplay and chart performance.

The song performed successfully in Myles's native Canada, becoming her first and only number-one hit on the RPM 100 Hit Tracks chart, staying four weeks at number one in November and December 1992. It also topped the RPM Adult Contemporary charts for one week in November 1992, becoming her second number one on that chart after "Lover of Mine" in 1990. In the United States, the record was ignored and did not get much airplay, and it was not released as a commercial single. In Europe and Australia, the record received airplay but was not a substantial hit, achieving minor chart placings in these regions; however, in Finland, it reached the top 20, peaking at number 13 in October 1992 and remaining in the top 30 for three charting periods (six weeks).

Larry Flick from Billboard magazine described the song as a "slow-building power ballad." He added that Myles "offers a strikingly restrained and unaffected vocal, while dramatic synths and acoustic guitars rise and swirl around her. Bodes well for the forthcoming Rockinghorse album." Randy Clark from Cashbox called it "another dark and brooding ballad", adding that "this cut is slightly off the rocker without the thumping bass line that pumped her first hit to the top of the charts, this time opting for an acoustically orchestrated backing."

== Music video ==
The stylish music video for "Song Instead of a Kiss" was directed by Scottish director Paul Boyd and filmed at Capitol Studios in Hollywood. In it, Myles is seen wearing different head coverings and shots of her lying in a bed while singing the song, with emphasis on close-ups on her face and her eyes.

== Awards and accolades ==
In 1993, the song was nominated for two Juno Awards, for Single of the Year, losing to the Celine Dion and Peabo Bryson duet "Beauty and the Beast", and for Best Producer to David Tyson. The song also received a SOCAN award in Canada, in 1994.

== Track listings ==
- Canadian and US cassette single
- UK and European 7-inch single
- Japanese mini-CD single
1. "Song Instead of a Kiss" – 3:57
2. "Rockinghorse" – 3:00
- UK and European CD single
- UK 12-inch maxi-single
1. "Song Instead of a Kiss" (edit) – 4:05
2. "Rockinghorse" – 3:00
3. "Love Is" – 3:39
4. "Song Instead of a Kiss" (LP version) – 5:03

== Charts ==
=== Weekly charts ===
Chart (1992–1993)	Peak position
Australia (ARIA)	152
Canada Top Singles (RPM)	1
Canada Adult Contemporary (RPM)	1
Finland (Suomen virallinen lista)	13
Netherlands (Dutch Top 40)	32
Netherlands (Single Top 100)	35
UK Singles (OCC)	89

=== Year-end charts ===
Chart (1992)	Position
Canada Top Singles (RPM)	3
Canada Adult Contemporary (RPM)	29

Chart (1993)	Position
Canada Top Singles (RPM)	57
Canada Adult Contemporary (RPM)	60

== Release history ==
Region	Date	Format(s)	Label(s)	Ref.
Canada	18 October 1992	Cassette	Atlantic	
Australia	26 October 1992	CD; cassette	Atlantic	
United Kingdom	2 November 1992	7-inch vinyl; CD; cassette	Atlantic	
Japan	10 November 1992	Mini-CD	Atlantic	
