= Love Is (Alannah Myles song) =

1989 single by Alannah Myles

Single by Alannah Myles

from the album Alannah Myles
- B-side: "Rock This Joint"
- Released: April 3, 1989
- Genre: Rock
- Length: 3:36
- Label: Atlantic
- Songwriters: David Tyson, Christopher Ward
- Producer: David Tyson

Alannah Myles singles chronology
"Love Is" (1989)	"Black Velvet" (1989)

"Love Is" is a song by Canadian singer-songwriter Alannah Myles, released in Canada in 1989 as her debut single. In the rest of the world except Australia, it was released as the follow-up to her worldwide hit "Black Velvet" in 1990. The same year, the song was nominated for the Juno Award for Single of the Year and lost to "Black Velvet".

== Release and reception ==
Released as a single in April 1989 in Canada, the song peaked at number 16 in June, establishing Myles's chart presence. In June 1989, it was released in Australia, but did not enter the top 100 chart until November 1989 and did not reach its peak of number 12 until April 1990, after "Black Velvet" had become a top 10 hit there. In the rest of the world, the song was released as the next single after "Black Velvet" in mid-1990 and charted moderately well worldwide but did not achieve the same level of success as "Black Velvet". In the United States, it peaked at number 36 on the Billboard Hot 100, her second top 40 hit on the chart, despite her later reputation as a one-hit wonder in that country, and entered the top 40 in Ireland, the Netherlands and Belgium.

== Music video ==
Two music videos directed by Canadian photographer and film director Deborah Samuel were created for the song: one for the Canadian release and the other in 1990 for the international release. The original 1989 video opens with a shot of Myles' legs walking onstage before she performs the song at a concert with her band. The 1990 video sees Myles and her band performing the song in a studio, intercut with black & white scenes of men and women flirting in a bar and scenes of Myles horseback riding in a desert, followed by an ostrich and a kangaroo. The desert scenes were filmed in Joshua Tree National Park, California.

== Track listings ==
CD maxi; 12-inch maxi

1. "Love Is" – 3:36
2. "Rock This Joint" – 4:00
3. "Hurry Make Love" – 2:15

7-inch single

1. "Love Is" – 3:36
2. "Rock This Joint" – 4:00

== Charts ==
=== Weekly charts ===
Chart (1989–1990)	Peak position
Australia (ARIA)	12
Belgium (Ultratop 50 Flanders)	39
Canada Top Singles (RPM)	16
Ireland (IRMA)	23
Netherlands (Dutch Top 40)	32
Netherlands (Single Top 100)	25
New Zealand (Recorded Music NZ)	44
UK Singles (Official Charts)	61
US Billboard Hot 100	36
US Album Rock Tracks (Billboard)	19
US Cash Box Top 100	32
West Germany (GfK)	45

=== Year-end charts ===
Chart (1990)	Position
Australia (ARIA)	52

== Certifications ==
Region	Certification	Certified units/sales
Australia (ARIA)	Gold	35,000^{^}
^{^} Shipments figures based on certification alone.

== Release history ==
Region	Date	Format(s)	Label(s)	Ref.
Canada	April 3, 1989	—N/a	Atlantic	
Australia	June 5, 1989	7-inch vinyl	Atlantic	
United Kingdom	May 29, 1990	7-inch vinyl; 12-inch vinyl; CD; cassette	Atlantic	
Japan	July 10, 1990	Mini-CD	Atlantic	
