= Selective amnesia =

Type of memory deficit

Selective amnesia is a type of amnesia in which the sufferer loses only certain parts of their memory. Common elements that may be forgotten are relationships, where they live, and certain special abilities and talents (e.g., juggling, whistling, instrumental talents, etc.).

== Factors ==
=== Emotional connotations ===
People may be more susceptible to hypnotic amnesia if the words they are asked to forget (or remember) have significant emotional connotations. Clemes (1964) was able to identify participants’ critical words—words that are linked with inner conflict—and neutral words—words that are not linked with inner conflict. He then placed the participants under hypnosis and listed nine critical words and nine neutral words. Participants were then instructed, under the influence of hypnosis, to forget half of the words they were given. They found that participants are more likely to forget critical words than neutral words. However, a replication study conducted by Stam and colleagues (1980) failed to replicate these results, suggesting that these conclusions may be invalid.

=== Familiarity ===
One's familiarity with a task influences how selective amnesia affects the subject's memories. To study this phenomenon, Lewis and colleagues (1969) taught rats a simple passive avoidance task, a fear-aggravated test used to evaluate learning and memory in rodent models. Some rats were allowed to familiarize themselves with the task while others were only allowed to experience the task once. After the rats had completed their task a pre-determined number of times, the experimenters administered an electroconvulsive shock to the rats meant to induce selective amnesia. These shocks varied in duration, lasting from zero to five seconds. The results of this study showed that only the rats unfamiliar with the task demonstrated selective amnesia 24 hours later. The rats that were familiar with the task seemed to display normal memory for the task. Thus, there might be a particular stage in the memory process that is vulnerable to selective amnesia. The current hypothesis is that this vulnerable stage is located during the transition from active memory to short term memory.

=== Types of memory ===
In an experiment investigating the functional role of the entorhinal cortex pars medialis in memory formation, Hölscher and Schmidt (1994) found that they could produce selective amnesia for specific types of memories by creating lesions that is painful in the brains of rats. In this experiment, both lesioned and non-lesioned rats were placed in an eight-armed maze with food in one of the arms. The rats had to orientate themselves to their surroundings to find the food. Rats with lesions showed significant memory problems, including memory failure and increased memory retrieval times, during trials in which they had to orient themselves using distal cues, the most distant cues. The researcher labeled these memory problems as selective amnesia. They also found that lesion-ed rats had a more difficult time finding the food when it was moved to a different arm. When the lesion-ed rats had to orient themselves in an egocentric test using proprioceptive cue, there were no detectable memory defects. This finding suggests that the type of memory a subject is trying to remember may influence the subject's susceptibility to selective amnesia.

=== Serial position ===
Watanabe and Yanagisawa (2000) found that the serial position effect may determine the task's susceptibility to selective amnesia. In their study, the researchers put mice through a maze with six ‘gates’. Each of these ‘gates’ had three doors, two of them locked and the third unlocked. They found that the mice were better at remembering the position of the unlocked gate if the gate's position was taught at the beginning or end of the trial. These findings provide support for the primacy effect and recency effect of serial positioning. Watanabe and Yanagisawa then took this a step further and injected some of the mice with high and low doses of scopolamine. At low doses, scopolamine intensified the primacy effect of serial positioning, and at high doses, scopolamine created major defects in general learning abilities. Their findings suggest that scopolamine may contain a property which plays a role in selective amnesia, specifically as it relates to serial positioning.

=== Memory consolidation ===
Some research suggests that selective amnesia may be the result of a deficit in memory consolidation. Mathis and colleagues (1992) investigated the effect of protein kinase C (PKC) on the memories of rats and found that they could induce a dose-dependent deficit in memory retention. They classified this memory deficit as selective amnesia. In this experiment, mice were trained to avoid a certain leg of a Y-shaped maze. After training, the experimenters gave a dose of NPC 15437 to the mice and noticed that the mice exhibited selective amnesia for the temporal aspect of the task but not the spatial aspect. The experimenters eliminated the possibly that this amnesia was due to a deficit in memory acquisition and retrieval, concluding that PKC interferes with the mechanisms behind memory consolidation.

== Use in treatment ==
It has been suggested that inducing selective amnesia for particular events or stimuli in patients may be an effective tool in psychotherapy. Alexander (1953) found that administering electroconvulsive therapy (ECT) to patients suffering from a traumatic life event induces selective amnesia for the traumatic event without affecting the patient's surrounding memories. This finding, as well as other similar findings, has been used to form a hypothesis concerning the mechanisms underlying ECT. This hypothesis states that the most decisive effect of ECT is the arousal of the active defensive operations in the brain. They further hypothesize that the arousal of these operations makes ECT an effective treatment for depression and other psychotic disorders in which the brain's defensive operations are ineffective. This hypothesis would also explain why ECT is an ineffective treatment for disorders in which the defensive operations are overactive such as anxiety disorders. Thus, selective amnesia, if utilized under the correct circumstances, may be useful in a therapeutic setting.

=== Hypnosis ===
==== Overview ====
Hypnotic amnesia, or forgetting under hypnosis, appears to be similar to naturally occurring clinical amnesia. However, hypnotic amnesia is distinct from naturally occurring amnesia because forgotten memories can be restored through a hypnotist's prearranged signal. Also, hypnotic amnesia is usually incomplete, meaning that the participants do not forget everything they were instructed to forget. Due to this trait, hypnosis can be used to research selective amnesia through studies that direct attention to the targets, or erased memories, of hypnotic amnesia.

==== Use in memory research ====
Researchers have used the relationship between hypnosis and selective amnesia to study specific memory processes including memory recall and retrieval cues. Bertrand and Spanos (1984) were able to study the process of memory recall by hypnotizing a group of undergraduate students, teaching the students three lists of words, and compelling the students to forget certain parts of these lists. They discovered that clustering related information together during initial learning may play a significant role in memory recall. In another experiment, Davidson and Bower (1991) found that participants with selective amnesia due to hypnosis were able to remember all non-amnesic information with near perfect recall. They also noticed that the participants recalled this information in very structured ways (usually in the same order the information was given). These results suggest that people experiencing hypnosis are still able to attend to important retrieval cues even though they are not able to recall the material specifically targeted by the amnesia.

== In everyday life ==
All people experience selective amnesia in their lives, and this selective amnesia may allow individuals to use their attention more effectively. In these studies, selective amnesia is defined as the phenomena experienced when a participant pays attention to the information given but then almost immediately forgets it. Rodrigues (2011) conducted a study in which participants were put into pairs and each pair was given five minutes to interact with an assigned stimuli. The participants’ actions and speech were recorded during this time. After the five minutes were completed, the experimenter questioned the participants about why the participants made certain decisions or said certain things. Rodrigues found that inattention blindness, attention capture, and selective amnesia all played a role in the participant's overall accuracy. Thus, even though most other forms of amnesia are harmful, selective amnesia may play a practical, and even helpful, role in our lives.

== Case studies ==
Because of the relative rarity of naturally occurring clinical selective amnesia, many case studies have been undertaken to learn more about the cause and course of the disorder.

=== Patient A ===
The following section is a summary of a case study performed by Scheerer and Goldstei in 1966. Patient A was a 36-year-old mechanic, formerly in the Navy, who had a wife and three children. Due to an unfortunate accident, Patient A's frontal lobe experienced significant damage. This brain damage resulted in a slight decrease in cognitive and physical skills as well as a change in personality. There were also some specific memory problems suggestive of selective amnesia. For example, Patient A worked with the same doctor for many years. However, if the doctor was absent for several days, Patient A was unable to remember him or, if Patient A did remember him, he thought the doctor was a Naval officer. Also, Patient A could only vaguely remember events that happened recently. For instance, he could remember if someone had visited him the day before but could not remember who had visited him. He could also report that he had formerly been in the Navy and that he had a wife and children, but there were many gaps and inconsistencies in his memory. While studying these inconsistencies, Scheerer and Goldstei found that Patient A's memory was sharpest for positive memories and weakest for negative memories. The study of Patient A gives evidence to the theory that patients with selective amnesia cling to specific memories, specifically positive memories. However, this fixation on positive memories causes patients to misremember negative or neutral life events, causing their memory to appear disjointed and defective.

=== Patient B ===
The following section is a summary of a case study performed by Sirigu and Grafman in 1996. Patient B was a male in his fifties. He suffered from a heart attack that caused damage to his brain secondary to cerebral anoxia. Due to his injury, he developed severe selective amnesia for the people and dates associated with both personal and public events. Though he could describe what happened during the event as well as the setting of the event, he could not give any information about the event's date or the people involved. His amnesia was temporally limited, affecting only his memories of the last two to three decades. This finding suggests that specific aspects of knowledge is stored separately, allowing for selective amnesia to affect one aspect of an event and not another.
