= Alannah Myles (album) =

Studio album by Alannah Myles
- Released: March 28, 1989
- Recorded: 1988
- Studios: McClear Place, Eastern Sound, Soundtown Studios and Sounds Interchange (Toronto, Canada)
- Genre: Blues rock
- Length: 39:19
- Label: Atlantic
- Producer: David Tyson

Alannah Myles chronology
Alannah Myles (1989)	Rockinghorse (1992)

Singles from Alannah Myles
- 1. "Love Is" Released: April 3, 1989; 2. "Black Velvet" Released: July 26, 1989; 3. "Still Got This Thing" Released: 1990; 4. "Lover of Mine" Released: February 1990

Alannah Myles is the debut album by Canadian singer Alannah Myles, released on March 28, 1989, by Atlantic Records. It includes the hit single "Black Velvet". The album was a commercial success and reached number 1 on the RPM Top Albums chart for two weeks in Myles's native Canada, number 5 on the Billboard 200 in the US, and number 3 in the UK Albums Chart.

== Track listing ==
All tracks written by Christopher Ward and David Tyson, except where noted.

No.	Title	Writer(s)	Length
1.	"Still Got This Thing"	Ward	4:35
2.	"Love Is"		3:39
3.	"Black Velvet"		4:47
4.	"Rock This Joint"	Ward	4:00
5.	"Lover of Mine"	Alannah Myles; Kit Johnson; Ward; Tyson	4:37
6.	"Kick Start My Heart"	Ward; Shirley Eikhard; Chris Waters; Madeline Stone	3:41
7.	"If You Want To"		4:11
8.	"Just One Kiss"		3:34
9.	"Who Loves You"		3:36
10.	"Hurry Make Love"	Nancy Simmonds	2:18

== Personnel ==
Musicians

- Alannah Myles – lead vocals, backing vocals
- David Tyson – keyboards, bass (1), backing vocals (1), synthesized fretless bass (3)
- Scott Humphrey – keyboard programming
- Bob Bartolucci – guitars
- Kurt Schefter – guitars
- David Wipper – acoustic guitars, mandolin
- Steve Webster – bass (1, 2, 4–10)
- Jørn Andersen – drums (1–8, 10)
- Gary Craig – drums (9)
- Michael Sloski – percussion
- John Johnson – saxophones
- Rick Waychesko – trumpet
- Jackie Richardson – backing vocals (1)
- Christopher Ward – backing vocals (1, 2)
- Peter Fredette – backing vocals (4, 6, 7)
- Dean McTaggart – backing vocals (4, 6)
- Lisa Dalbello – backing vocals (6, 8)

Production

- Christopher Ward – executive producer
- David Tyson – producer
- Kevin Doyle – engineer, mixing (2, 3, 6)
- Pete Willis – engineer
- Tom Eymundson – assistant engineer
- Steve Harrison – assistant engineer
- Mike Jones – assistant engineer
- Martin Lee – assistant engineer
- Paul Seeley – assistant engineer
- Paul Shubat – assistant engineer
- Lou Solakofski – assistant engineer
- Paul Lani – mixing (1, 4, 5, 7–10)
- David Dorn – mix assistant
- Atlantic Studios (New York City, New York, USA) – mixing location
- George Marino – mastering at Sterling Sound (New York City, New York)
- Bob Defrin – art direction
- Valerie Sinclair – lettering design
- Deborah Samuel – cover photography

== Charts ==
=== Weekly charts ===
Weekly chart performance for Alannah Myles
Chart (1990)	Peak position
Australian Albums (ARIA)	2
Austrian Albums (Ö3 Austria)	2
Canada Top Albums/CDs (RPM)	1
Dutch Albums (Album Top 100)	9
European Albums (Music & Media)	4
Finnish Albums (Suomen virallinen lista)	1
German Albums (Offizielle Top 100)	2
Icelandic Albums (Tónlist)	4
New Zealand Albums (RMNZ)	5
Norwegian Albums (VG-lista)	1
Swedish Albums (Sverigetopplistan)	2
Swiss Albums (Schweizer Hitparade)	1
UK Albums (Official Charts)	3
US Billboard 200	5

=== Year-end charts ===
1989 year-end chart performance for Alannah Myles
Chart (1989)	Position
Canada Top Albums/CDs (RPM)	5

1990 year-end chart performance for Alannah Myles
Chart (1990)	Position
Australian Albums (ARIA)	9
Austrian Albums (Ö3 Austria)	12
Canada Top Albums/CDs (RPM)	4
Dutch Albums (Album Top 100)	54
European Albums (Music & Media)	12
German Albums (Offizielle Top 100)	13
New Zealand Albums (RMNZ)	7
Norwegian Spring Period Albums (VG-lista)	4
Swiss Albums (Schweizer Hitparade)	4
US Billboard 200	39

== Certifications ==
Certifications for Alannah Myles
Region	Certification	Certified units/sales
Australia (ARIA)	3× Platinum	210,000^{^}
Austria (IFPI Austria)	Gold	25,000^{*}
Finland (Musiikkituottajat)	Platinum	59,694
Germany (BVMI)	Platinum	500,000^{^}
Canada (Music Canada)	Diamond	1,000,000^{^}
New Zealand (RMNZ)	Platinum	15,000^{^}
Sweden (GLF)	Platinum	100,000^{^}
Switzerland (IFPI Switzerland)	Platinum	50,000^{^}
United Kingdom (BPI)	Gold	100,000^{^}
United States (RIAA)	Platinum	1,000,000^{^}
^{*} Sales figures based on certification alone.^{^} Shipments figures based on certification alone.
