= Robert Priest =

Canadian poet and writer (born 1951)

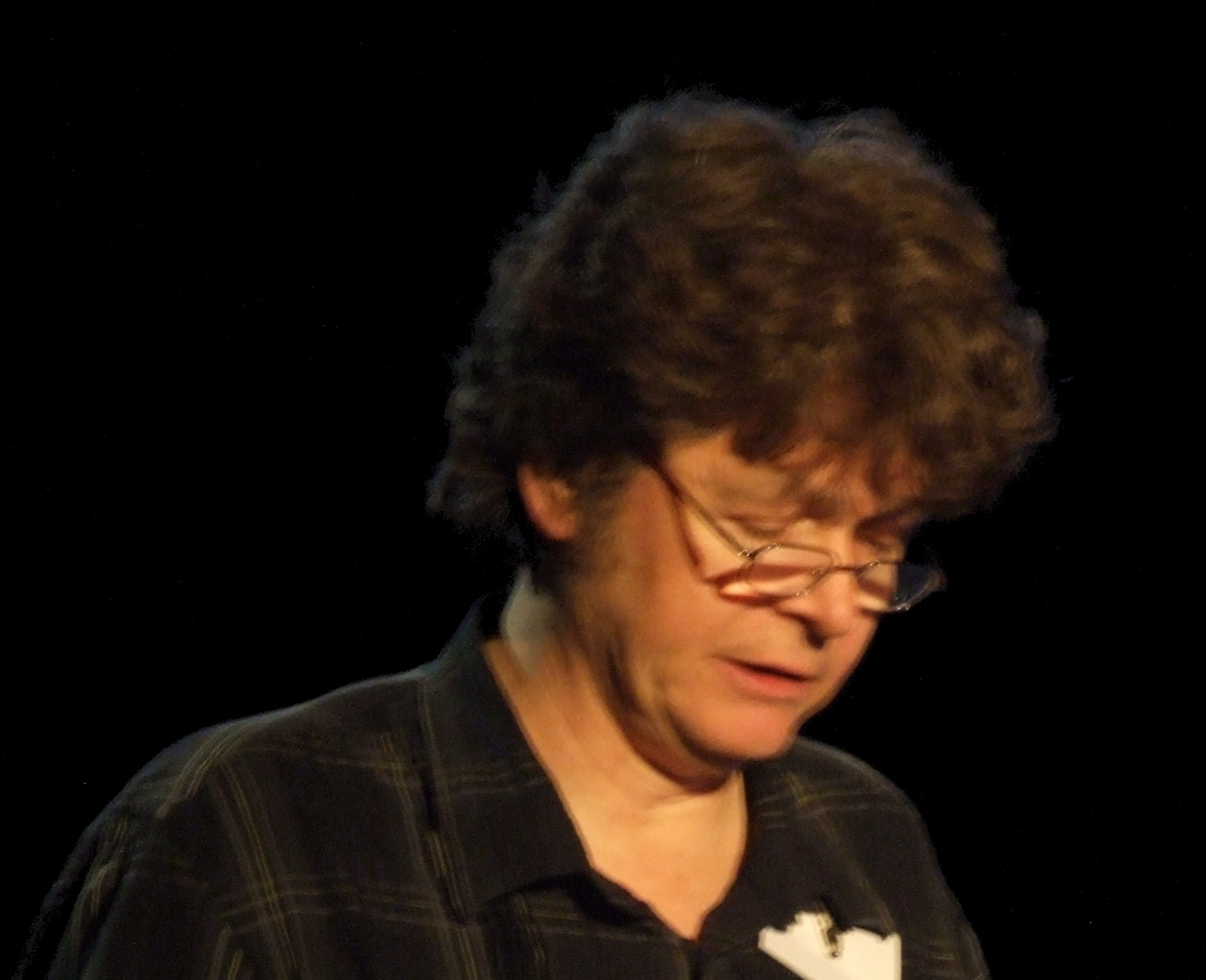
- Robert Priest in 2007
- Born: 10 July 1951 (age 75); Walton-on-Thames, England
- Occupation: Author
- Writing career
- Genre: Children's literature

Robert Priest (born 10 July 1951, in Walton-on-Thames, England) is a Canadian poet, children's author and singer-songwriter. He has written eighteen books of poetry, four children's novels, four children's albums, and six CDs of songs and poems. Under the alias "Dr Poetry", he has also written and performed two seasons of poetry on CBC Radio's spoken-word show "Wordbeat" and is well known for his aphorisms and the No. 1 Alannah Myles hit "Song Instead of a Kiss". Of his adult poetry, The Pacific Rim Review has written "He is certainly one of the most imaginatively inventive poets in the country," while critic Bernice Lever has opined "Robert Priest’s poems will speak to many generations." Robert's children's poetry is also much praised. "His poetry for children is almost miraculous" gushed pre-eminent children's literature critic Michele Landsberg, "It is almost pure celebration." The Toronto Star described his selected poems as "passionate, cocky, alternately adoring and insulting." Priest's plays, novels and songs have earned him awards and recognition in Canadian literary circles and a growing worldwide readership. His 2022 CD of songs Love is Hard produced by Bob Wiseman is currently streaming worldwide and available for download on 'CDbaby'.

== Biography ==
Born in 1951, his family emigrated to Toronto, Canada, at the age of four. His father spent seven years in the British Navy, and his mother, a part-time standup comedian was a member of the Women's Royal Naval Service (WRNS), popularly known as the Wrens. Growing up in Scarborough, Priest developed a love of literature from the fanciful stories his mother often told before bedtime and later from the books available to him from the bookmobile – a mobile public library. By the age of eight, Priest says, he had already begun to dream of becoming a writer. In 1970 he entered the University of Waterloo to study mathematics, but, much more compelled to write poetry dropped out after one semester. Since his first book of poetry (The Visible Man, 1979), he has published eighteen more books of poetry, four plays, four children's/young adult novels and many articles in Toronto's Now Magazine. He is also a singer-songwriter of note, having released six rock albums for adults and three collections of children's music. He also wrote and performed numerous children's songs for CBC radio's Is Anybody Home and for the long-running television show Sesame Street. A song he cowrote with Nancy Simmonds and Alannah Myles was a number one hit in Canada and is still played all around the world. He lives in Toronto with Marsha Kirzner.

== Awards and recognition ==
The author of 23 books of poetry and prose, he won the Milton Acorn Memorial People's Poetry Award for The Mad Hand (1988). Under his "Dr. Poetry" alias, Robert wrote and performed thirteen segments for CBC radio's spoken-word show Wordbeat. As a songwriter, he co-wrote (with Alannah Myles and Nancy Simmonds) the hit, "Song Instead of a Kiss" which rose to the top of the charts for two weeks in Canada and maintained that position for six weeks in Quebec earning Robert a SOCAN airplay award. It still receives considerable airplay all around the world. His aphorisms have appeared in the Farmers' Almanac and Colombo's Canadian Quotations. He is the author of four plays, including The Coming, which was co-written with Leon Rooke. Priest's musical play Minibugs and Microchips received a Chalmers Award. His novel, Knights of the Endless Day (1993) was the recipient of an Our Choice Award from the Canadian Children's Book Centre. Among his volumes of children's poetry, Daysongs Nightsongs and The Secret Invasion of Bananas and Other Poems (2002) are on a recommended reading list compiled by the CBC. His book of poems Reading the Bible Backwards (2008 ECW Press) reached number 2 on the Canadian poetry charts its sales exceeded only by those of Leonard Cohen. His 2013 book of poems for children and young adults Rosa Rose (Wolsak & Wynn) won a Silver Moonbeam Award and was a book of honour in the Lion and the Unicorn award for poetry in the North American category at Johns Hopkins University while its sequelThe Wolf is Back won the Gold Moonbeam Award for best book of children's poems in the Americas. His fantasy trilogy Spell Crossed was the winner of an Our Choice Award and has been described as a modern classic. A collection of songs: 'Love is Hard' produced by Bob Wiseman was released in 2020 and is available world-wide on the streaming services and through CDbaby. In 2022 Robert co-wrote the lead-off single for Julian Taylor's album Beyond the Reservoir, "S.E.E.D.S.", which was a top 5 hit on the CBC's Music Chart. Robert's most recent book of adult poetry If I Didn't Love the River was published in the fall of 2022 by ECW Press. 2024 saw the release of the Jaymz Bee produced collection: People Like You and Me which featured a mix of poems and songs backed by the cream of Toronto's jazz musicians. A new volume of poetry Accidents After Happening will be published in Fall of 2025 by ECW Press.

== Selected bibliography ==
Adult poetry

- The Visible Man (1980) Unfinished Monument
- Sadness of Spacemen (1980) Dreadnaught
- The Man Who Broke Out of the Letter X (1984) Coach House
- The Three Roberts on Childhood (1984; Robert Sward and Robert Zend) ISBN 0-920259-07-3
- The Mad Hand (1988) Coach House
- Scream Blue Living (1992) ISBN 0-920544-92-4
- Resurrection in the Cartoon (1997) ISBN 1-55022-313-5 ECW Press
- Time Release Poems (1997) Ekstasis
- Blue Pyramids:New and Selected Poems (2002) ISBN 1-55022-554-5 ECW Press
- How to Swallow a Pig (2004) ISBN 1-55022-649-5 ECW Press
- Reading the Bible Backwards (Poems: ECW press) (2008) ISBN 978-1-55022-835-9
- Previously Feared Darkness (Poems: ECW press) (2013) ISBN 978-1-77041-164-7
- If I Didn't Love the River (Poems: ECW press) (2022) ISBN 978-1-77041-694 9

Children's Poetry and fiction

- The Short Hockey Career of Amazing Jany (1986) Aya Press
- The Ruby Hat (1987) ISBN 0-920544-47-9 Aya Press
- Knights of the Endless Day (1993)(Penguin Viking)
- A Terrible Case of the Stars (Penguin)(1994)
- The Secret Invasion of Bananas and Other Poems (2002)(Seraphim) ISBN 1-896860-97-4
- Rosa Rose, with illustrator Joan Krygsman. (Wolsak and Wynn, 2013). ISBN 978-1894987738
- The Wolf is Back, with illustrator Joan Krygsman. (Wolsak and Wynn, 2017). ISBN 978-1-928088-29-5
- The Paper Sword (Dundurn, 2014), a young-adult fantasy novel. ISBN 978-1459708266
- Second Kiss, (Dundurn, 2015) ISBN 978-1-4597-3020-5
- Missing Piece, (Dundurn, 2016) ISBN 978-1459730434

Recordings

- The Robert Priest E.P. (Airwave Records) 1982
- Congo Toronto/Rock Awhile (single) Robot Records 1986
- Broken Star/Still Can't Say Goodbye (single) Major Label Records 1987
- Rottweiler Pacifist (songs and poems) Coach House Press/the music Gallery 1990
- Tongue‘n’Groove (‘Spoken Word and song CD’) Artisan Music 1997
- Feeling the Pinch (CDbaby and streaming services) 2012
- BAAM! (CDbaby and streaming services)2017
- Love is Hard (CDbaby and streaming services)2022
- People Like You and Me (CDbaby and streaming services)2024

Children's Music

- Summerlong The Boinks (G-tel) 1984
- Playsongs and Lullabies (children's music) (The Teds) Waterlily Music 1989
- Winterlong (songs & poems for children) (The Teds, Waterlily Music) 1992
- Daysongs Nightsongs ( children's songs and poems) Groundwood 1993
