= David Tyson =

Canadian record producer

David Michael Tyson is a Canadian rock producer and songwriter. He is best known for co-writing Alannah Myles' 1990 single "Black Velvet" (with Christopher Ward), which peaked the Billboard Hot 100, along with producing its parent album. He also co-wrote three hit songs (with Dean McTaggart) from Amanda Marshall's self-titled 1995 debut album.

Tyson has won three Juno Awards for his work, mainly in the 1990s. Most notably he was awarded the Producer of the Year in 1991 for his work on Jude Cole's A View from 3rd Street album, and Songwriter of the Year for his work with Hall & Oates.

== Partial production discography ==
- 1981: Eddie Schwartz - No Refuge - co-producer with Schwartz, as well as co-writer, keyboards
- 1984: Eddie Schwartz - Public Life - co-producer with Schwartz, as well as co-writer, keyboards, bass, glockenspiel, backing vocals
- 1984: The Arrows - Stand Back - also co-writer, keyboards
- 1986: The Arrows - The Lines Are Open
- 1989: Alannah Myles - Alannah Myles
- 1990: Jude Cole - A View from 3rd Street - also keyboards, arrangement
- 1992: Alannah Myles - Rockinghorse
- 1992: Peter Cetera - World Falling Down
- 1995: Amanda Marshall - Amanda Marshall
- 1994: Tina Arena - Don't Ask - also co-writer
- 1997: Tina Arena - In Deep - also co-writer, keyboards
- 2000: Billie Myers - Vertigo - also co-writer
- 2001: Point of Grace - Free to Fly
- 2016: Heather Rankin - A Fine Line - also co-writer

== Awards ==
- 1984 - Nominated - Juno Award for Producer of the Year - for Stand Back
- 1986 - Nominated - Juno Award for Producer of the Year - for The Lines Are Open
- 1990 - Winner - Juno Award for Composer of the Year - for "Black Velvet" (with Christopher Ward)
- 1990 - Nominated - Juno Award for Producer of the Year - for Alannah Myles
- 1991 - Winner - Juno Award for Songwriter of the Year - for Jude Cole's A View from 3rd Street and Hall & Oates' "Don't Hold Back Your Love"
- 1991 - Winner - Juno Award for Producer of the Year - for Jude Cole's A View from 3rd Street
- 1993 - Nominated - Juno Award for Producer of the Year - for Alannah Myles' Rockinghorse
- 1995 - Producer of ARIA Album of the Year - for Tina Arena's Don't Ask
- 1996 - Nominated - Juno Award for Producer of the Year - for Amanda Marshall
- 1998 - Nominated - Juno Award for Songwriter of the Year - for "Dark Horse" (with Dean McTaggart & Amanda Marshall), "Beautiful Goodbye" (with Christopher Ward), "Trust Me This Is Love" (with Dean McTaggart) by Amanda Marshall
- 2003 - Won an International Achievement Award for the song "Begin With Me" at the SOCAN Awards in Toronto.
