= Black Velvet (song) =

1989 single by Alannah Myles

Single by Alannah Myles

from the album Alannah Myles
- B-side: "If You Want To"
- Released: July 1989
- Genre: Blues rock; country rock
- Length: 4:47 (album version); 4:02 (single version)
- Label: Atlantic
- Songwriters: David Tyson; Christopher Ward
- Producer: David Tyson

Alannah Myles singles chronology
| "Love Is" (1989) | "Black Velvet" (1989) | "Still Got This Thing" (1990) |

Music video
- "Black Velvet" on YouTube

"Black Velvet" is a song written by Canadian songwriters Christopher Ward and David Tyson and recorded by Canadian singer-songwriter Alannah Myles. It was released in July 1989 as the second single from Myles' first studio album, Alannah Myles (1989), by Atlantic Records.

"Black Velvet" became a number-one hit on the US Billboard Hot 100 and reached number one on the Billboard Album Rock Tracks chart, as well as number 10 in Myles' native Canada. Outside North America, the song reached number one in Norway, Sweden, and Switzerland and peaked at number two on the UK Singles Chart, becoming a top-10 hit in 16 countries. The accompanying music video, partially shot on Myles's family ranch, was directed by Doug Freel.

Myles won the 1991 Grammy for Best Female Rock Vocal Performance for "Black Velvet" and the 1990 Juno Award for Single of the Year. The song has received substantial airplay receiving a "Millionaire Award" from ASCAP in 2005 for more than four million radio plays.

== Background and writing ==
The song is a paean to Elvis Presley. Co-writer Christopher Ward, Myles's then-boyfriend, was inspired to write the lyrics on a bus full of Elvis fans who were going to Graceland in Memphis in the summer of 1987, on the 10th anniversary of Elvis's death. He brought his idea to Myles and producer David Tyson, who wrote the chords for the bridge. The song was one of three in a demo presented by Myles to Atlantic Records which got her signed to the label.

Atlantic Records also gave the song to country artist Robin Lee to record in the United States. Myles's version was released in December 1989; Lee's version was released two months later, in February 1990. Myles was promoted by Atlantic on pop and rock radio stations and Lee was promoted on country radio stations.

Myles released a new version of the song on a digitally recorded Elvis tribute EP in August 2007 to commemorate 30 years since his death. This version was included on her 2008 Black Velvet CD.

Musical structure: The song is performed in the key of E♭ minor, with a swinging tempo of 92 beats per minute in 4/4 time. Myles' lead vocals span a range from E♭_{3} to E♭_{5} in the song.

== Reception ==
=== Critical reception ===
Music & Media described the song as "a blues ballad featuring some straight-from-the-heart vocals from Myles and inspired guitar playing".

=== Commercial reception ===
As the second single of Myles' debut album, it was first released in her native Canada in July 1989. It peaked at number 10 in September of that year, becoming the first of four top-10 hits for Myles in her homeland. Worldwide, it was released as Myles' debut single. It was released in the United States in December 1989 and worldwide in early 1990, becoming a top-10 hit in most countries where it was released. It peaked at number one in four countries: Norway, Sweden, Switzerland, and the United States and received gold and platinum discs in several countries. This was her biggest hit in the US, leading to her being seen as a one-hit wonder.

== Music video ==
The music video for "Black Velvet", directed by Doug Freel, was partially shot on Myles's family ranch in Buckhorn, Ontario. Myles is seen singing on a cabin porch with her guitarist, Kurt Schefter (Raving Mojos), intercut with scenes from Myles in concert with her band. The concert scene was filmed in Kingston, Ontario, in a bar called Stages.

== Track listings ==
- CD maxi
1. "Black Velvet" – 4:40
2. "If You Want To" – 4:11
3. "Who Loves You" – 3:36
- 7-inch single
1. "Black Velvet" – 4:02
2. "If You Want To" – 4:11
- 12-inch maxi
1. "Black Velvet" – 4:40
2. "If You Want To" – 4:11
3. "Who Loves You" – 3:36

== Charts ==
=== Weekly charts ===
1990 weekly chart performance for "Black Velvet"
| Chart (1989–1990) | Peak position |
|---|---|
| Australia (ARIA) | 3 |
| Austria (Ö3 Austria Top 40) | 2 |
| Belgium (Ultratop 50 Flanders) | 2 |
| Canada Top Singles (RPM) | 10 |
| Denmark (IFPI) | 3 |
| Europe (Eurochart Hot 100) | 2 |
| Finland (Suomen virallinen lista) | 4 |
| France (SNEP) | 24 |
| Ireland (IRMA) | 4 |
| Luxembourg (Radio Luxembourg) | 2 |
| Netherlands (Dutch Top 40) | 3 |
| Netherlands (Single Top 100) | 3 |
| New Zealand (Recorded Music NZ) | 2 |
| Norway (VG-lista) | 1 |
| Sweden (Sverigetopplistan) | 1 |
| Switzerland (Schweizer Hitparade) | 1 |
| UK Singles (Official Charts) | 2 |
| US Billboard Hot 100 | 1 |
| US Adult Contemporary (Billboard) | 7 |
| US Album Rock Tracks (Billboard) | 1 |
| US Top 40/Rock (Billboard) | 1 |
| West Germany (GfK) | 2 |

2010 weekly chart performance for "Black Velvet"
| Chart (2010) | Peak position |
|---|---|
| Denmark (Tracklisten) | 29 |

2022 weekly chart performance for "Black Velvet"
| Chart (2022) | Peak position |
|---|---|
| Poland Airplay (ZPAV) | 90 |

2024 weekly chart performance for "Black Velvet"
| Chart (2024) | Peak position |
|---|---|
| Estonia Airplay (TopHit) | 71 |

=== Year-end charts ===
1989 year-end chart performance for "Black Velvet"
| Chart (1989) | Position |
|---|---|
| Canada Top Singles (RPM) | 81 |

1990 year-end chart performance for "Black Velvet"
| Chart (1990) | Position |
|---|---|
| Australia (ARIA) | 13 |
| Austria (Ö3 Austria Top 40) | 6 |
| Belgium (Ultratop) | 21 |
| Europe (Eurochart Hot 100) | 9 |
| Germany (Media Control) | 11 |
| Netherlands (Dutch Top 40) | 13 |
| Netherlands (Single Top 100) | 15 |
| New Zealand (RIANZ) | 10 |
| Sweden (Topplistan) | 2 |
| Switzerland (Schweizer Hitparade) | 10 |
| UK Singles (OCC) | 18 |
| US Billboard Hot 100 | 18 |
| US Album Rock Tracks (Billboard) | 5 |
| US Cash Box Top 100 | 25 |

2024 year-end chart performance for "Black Velvet"
| Chart (2024) | Position |
|---|---|
| Estonia Airplay (TopHit) | 165 |

2025 year-end chart performance for "Black Velvet"
| Chart (2025) | Position |
|---|---|
| Estonia Airplay (TopHit) | 154 |

== Certifications ==
Certifications for "Black Velvet"
| Region | Certification | Certified units/sales |
|---|---|---|
| Australia (ARIA) | Platinum | 70,000^{^} |
| Austria (IFPI Austria) | Gold | 25,000^{*} |
| Denmark (IFPI Danmark) | Platinum | 90,000^{‡} |
| Germany (BVMI) | Gold | 250,000^{^} |
| New Zealand (RMNZ) | 3× Platinum | 90,000^{‡} |
| Sweden (GLF) | Platinum | 50,000^{^} |
| United Kingdom (BPI) | Platinum | 600,000^{‡} |
| United States (RIAA) | Gold | 500,000^{^} |
^{*} Sales figures based on certification alone.^{^} Shipments figures based on certification alone.^{‡} Sales+streaming figures based on certification alone.

== Release history ==
Release dates and formats for "Black Velvet"
| Region | Date | Format(s) | Label(s) | Ref. |
|---|---|---|---|---|
| Canada | July 1989 | 7-inch vinyl | Atlantic | |
| United States | December 1989 | 7-inch vinyl; cassette | Atlantic | |
| United Kingdom | February 26, 1990 | 7-inch vinyl; 12-inch vinyl; CD; cassette | Atlantic | |
| Japan | April 25, 1990 | Mini-CD | Atlantic | |

== Other versions ==
"Black Velvet"

Single by Robin Lee

from the album Black Velvet
- Released: February 1990
- Genre: Country
- Length: 4:43 (album version)
- Label: Atlantic
- Songwriters: David Tyson, Christopher Ward
- Producer: Nelson Larkin

Robin Lee singles chronology
| "Before You Cheat on Me Once" (1989) | "Black Velvet" (1990) | "How About Goodbye" (1990) |

American country music artist Robin Lee, who was also signed to Atlantic at the time, covered "Black Velvet" in 1990 on her third studio album, also titled Black Velvet. Lee's version peaked at No. 12 on the US Billboard Hot Country Singles & Tracks chart.

Idols South Africa winner Anke Pietrangeli covered the song on her album Tribute to the Great Female Vocalists in 2009.

In 2015, Canadian heavy metal band Kobra and the Lotus recorded the song for their first EP, entitled Words of the Prophets.

In 2021, X Factor winner Sam Bailey recorded the song as her rock debut. The song was released through independent record label Saga Entertainment on August 6, 2021. The song peaked at number one on the Amazon best sellers chart.

In 2022, the Israeli psychedelic trance duo, Infected Mushroom, released a cover of the song featuring Ninet Tayeb. It was released through record label Monstercat and is featured on Infected Mushroom's IM25 album.

=== Charts ===
Weekly chart performance for "Black Velvet" by Robin Lee
| Chart (1990) | Peak position |
|---|---|
| Canada Country Singles (RPM) | 21 |
| US Hot Country Singles & Tracks (Billboard) | 12 |

== See also ==
- List of Billboard Hot 100 number-one singles of 1990
- List of European number-one airplay songs of the 1990s
