= Alannah Myles =

Canadian singer-songwriter (born 1958)

Background information
- Born: Alannah Byles; December 25, 1958 (age 67); Toronto, Ontario, Canada
- Genres: Rock; pop; blues
- Occupations: Singer; songwriter; actress
- Instrument: Vocals
- Years active: 1977–present
- Labels: Atlantic; Fascinate Inc.
- Website: alannahmyles.com

Alannah Myles (née Byles; born December 25, 1958) is a Canadian singer-songwriter who has won both a Grammy and a Juno Award for the song "Black Velvet". The song was a top-ten hit in Canada and a number one hit on the US Billboard Hot 100 in 1990.

== Early life ==
Myles was born Alannah Byles on Christmas Day, 1958 in Toronto, Ontario. She is the daughter of William Douglas Byles, a pioneer in the Canadian broadcasting industry who was inducted into the Canadian Broadcast Hall of Fame in 1997. She is the second of five children. Raised by her parents in Ontario, Myles spent her childhood composing and learning music. Myles began writing songs around age 9 and performed in a songwriting group for the Kiwanis Music Festival in Toronto at age 12.

== Career ==
At the age of 18, she began performing solo gigs in southern Ontario, eventually meeting Christopher Ward, a recording artist and songwriter with Warner Music Group. With Ward's help, she formed her own band and performed cover versions of rock and blues songs while polishing her own material.

Myles changed her surname from Byles at the age of 19 after deciding to pursue a career in entertainment. Appearances in TV commercials paid for music demos that led to numerous rejections in Canada until she recorded masters for three songs; "Who Loves You" and a video demo for "Just One Kiss", directed by photographer Deborah Samuel. With matched financing from her songwriting collaborator, MuchMusic (City TV) and program director Christopher Ward, she signed her first record contract with Atlantic Records in 1987.

Myles was featured in several TV and film productions as a guest host and actor prior to becoming a recording artist. She appeared in a 1984 episode of the television series The Kids of Degrassi Street, in which she played the role of an aspiring singer and single mother. In 1989, she appeared in an episode of War of the Worlds, which aired only three weeks after the release of her self-titled debut album.

Myles was a candidate to be the original host of FashionTelevision, as shared by Jeanne Beker on the Reinvention of the VJ podcast, hosted by Erica Ehm. Beker suggested that Ward was lobbying for Myles to get the role on the new TV program. Beker would eventually become the program's first host.

In late 1987, Warner Music Canada's director of artists and repertoire (A&R), Bob Roper, sent Myles's three-song video package to all of Warner Music Group's US affiliates, which garnered a contract for seven or eight years from Atlantic Records (WMG), given by head of A&R Tunc Erim and Atlantic label founder Ahmet Ertegun. Myles left her acting career and co-wrote and recorded the remainder of her first album with Christopher Ward and producer David Tyson.

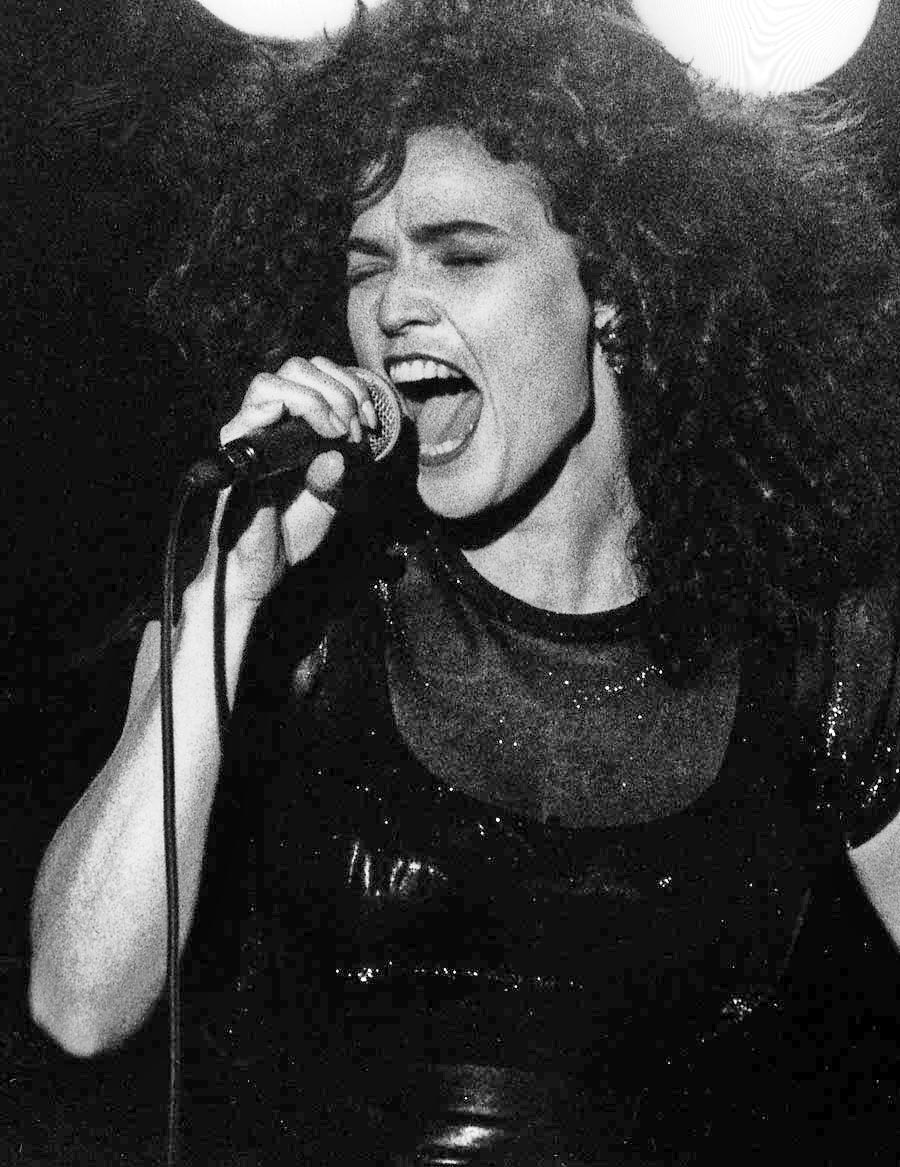
Myles performing

In May 1989, Warner Music in Canada released Alannah Myles, which produced four Top 40 hits, including "Love Is", "Lover Of Mine", "Still Got This Thing" and her number-one song, "Black Velvet". It was ineligible for Grammy nominations until the early 1990 US single release "Black Velvet" became a number-one hit, claiming ASCAP's most played song on radio for 1989 and 1990. By 2005, it had received ASCAP Millionaire Award for over four million radio airplays. "Black Velvet" won Myles the Grammy Award for Best Female Rock Performance in 1991 and three Juno Awards. The album was the first debut album from a Canadian artist to be certified Diamond by the Canadian Recording Industry Association for sales of over one million units, and was reported to have sold more than six million copies internationally.

In 1992, Myles was nominated for a second Grammy award for Best Female Rock Vocal Performance for her second CD Rockinghorse. "Song Instead Of a Kiss", written and composed by Myles, Nancy Simmonds, and Canadian poet Robert Priest, was a 60-piece orchestrated ballad that reached number one on several radio stations around the globe but was met with little response in America, whose audiences were accustomed to "that slow southern style" of "Black Velvet". The album, released that year, included the other hit singles "Our World, Our Times", and "Sonny, Say You Will". Myles received a Grammy nomination for Rockinghorse and several global awards, including a Juno and Much Music's People's Choice Award for "Our World, Our Times".

In 1991, Myles sang "O Canada" at a Major League Baseball game at Skydome in Toronto. It was broadcast on CBS Sports.

In 1995, Myles released her final album on Atlantic Records before being released from the label, granting Warner/Atlantic a Best Of CD after only three records. The A-lan-nah album, which contained no Top 40 singles, included two tracks which made it into the Top 100, namely "Family Secret" and "Blow Wind, Blow".

In 1997, she terminated her eight-record contract with Atlantic Records with the help of her then-manager Miles Copeland III, who immediately signed her to his own Ark 21 Records. On Ark 21, she released Arival, which contained the Top 40 hit "Bad 4 You", written and recorded by Myles, Desmond Child, and Eric Bazilian at Copeland's Castle songwriting retreat at Grand Brassac, France. The Arival album agreement with Miles Copeland III, Ark 21 Records was successfully terminated in 2014 with 100% copyright reversions returned to Alannah Myles by 2015 and re-released on Myles's independently owned label, Fascinate inc.

After the release of Arival, Myles released two Best of compilations, in 1998 and 2001, both featuring two new songs, and then left Ark 21 Records. She maintained a low profile for almost a decade but gigged around Canada and Europe during this time. In 2001, Myles duetted with Saga frontman Michael Sadler on a cover of Peter Gabriel and Kate Bush's "Don't Give Up", released as a B-side to the Saga single "Money Talks". In 2004, she released a cover of "I Can't Stand the Rain", with Jeff Healey on guitar, for a Tina Turner tribute album What's Love? A Tribute to Tina Turner.

In February 2005, together with the Swedish band Kee Marcello's K2, Myles participated in the third semi-final of Melodifestivalen, the Swedish national selection for the Eurovision Song Contest 2005. Their selection, "We Got It All", scored very few points and finished seventh out of eight songs, yet it managed to dominate the leading newspaper and media headlines in Sweden.

Myles' first new solo release in a decade was the Elvis Tribute EP, released on iTunes in August 2007, to commemorate the 30th anniversary of Elvis Presley's death. The EP features a re-recording of her signature song "Black Velvet", as well as two new songs. All three of them were later included on her next album.

In April 2008, Myles released her fifth studio album, Black Velvet, which featured a new recording of her song of the same name, in addition to 10 new studio recordings. Myles financed and co-produced the album.

In early 2008, Myles released the CD Black Velvet on Linus Entertainment, which resulted in a staggered release internationally while the indie label merged with Canada's True North Records, followed by a video for the song "Trouble" featuring a jug band performance. "Trouble" was awarded an 'Honourable Mention' as a finalist in the blues category at the 2009 International Songwriting Contest. Myles won the 15th annual USA Songwriting Competition for both Best Rock/Alternative Song as well as grand prize finalist for a selection, written and composed jointly with Nancy Simmonds for her Black Velvet CD, titled "Give Me Love".

Myles' song "Black Velvet" was one of four selected to be covered on the CBC Television reality television show Cover Me Canada.

After terminating a six-year lease with Canadian indie label Linus Entertainment in August 2013, Myles' Black Velvet album was retitled 85bpm, repackaged for her 25th anniversary with new images photographed by fellow Canadian Deborah Samuel. A newly recorded song written by Anne Peebles, produced by Michael Borkosky, "Can't Stand the Rain" was added to 85bpm, featuring a solo played by Canadian guitarist Jeff Healey, re-released on Myles' independently owned label, Fascinate inc., digitally distributed by Tunecore.com, with audio CDs and a 25th anniversary live concert DVD, both distributed by Amazon.com in the US.

== Discography ==
- Alannah Myles (1989)
- Rockinghorse (1992)
- A-lan-nah (1995)
- Arival (1997)
- Black Velvet (2008)
- 85 BPM (2014)

== Awards and nominations ==
| Award | Year | Nominee(s) | Category | Result | Ref. |
|---|---|---|---|---|---|
| AMOA Jukebox Awards | 1990 | Herself | Rising Star | Nominated | |
| AMOA Jukebox Awards | 1990 | "Black Velvet" | Pop Record of the Year | Nominated | |
| Canadian Music Video Awards | 1990 | "Black Velvet" | Most Popular Female Video | Won | |
| Canadian Music Video Awards | 1993 | "Our World, Our Times" | People's Choice: Favourite Female Artist | Won | |
| Grammy Awards | 1991 | "Black Velvet" | Best Rock Vocal Performance, Female | Won | |
| Grammy Awards | 1993 | Rockinghorse | Best Rock Vocal Performance, Female | Nominated | |
| Juno Awards | 1990 | "Love Is" | Single of the Year | Nominated | |
| Juno Awards | 1990 | "Black Velvet" | Single of the Year | Won | |
| Juno Awards | 1990 | Alannah Myles | Album of the Year | Won | |
| Juno Awards | 1990 | Herself | Most Promising Female Vocalist | Won | |
| Juno Awards | 1991 | Herself | Canadian Entertainer of the Year | Nominated | |
| Juno Awards | 1993 | "Song Instead of a Kiss" | Single of the Year | Nominated | |
| Juno Awards | 1994 | Rockinghorse | Album of the Year | Nominated | |
| Juno Awards | 1994 | Herself | Female Vocalist of the Year | Nominated | |
| Juno Awards | 1997 | Herself | Female Vocalist of the Year | Nominated | |
| MTV Video Music Awards | 1990 | "Black Velvet" | Best New Artist in a Video | Nominated | |
| MTV Video Music Awards | 1990 | "Black Velvet" | Best Female Video | Nominated | |

== See also ==
- Canadian rock
- List of diamond-certified albums in Canada
- Music of Canada
