= Christopher Ward (songwriter) =

Canadian songwriter and broadcaster

- Born: Christopher William Ward; 28 July 1949 (age 77); Toronto, Ontario, Canada
- Genre: Pop
- Occupations: Songwriter; broadcaster; judge; author
- Instruments: Piano; guitar
- Labels: Warner Bros.; Attic
- Website: www.christopherward.ca

Christopher William Ward (born 28 July 1949) is a Canadian songwriter and broadcaster, known as a former long-standing on-air personality at MuchMusic, Canada's music video network, where he and J.D. Roberts were among the first video jockeys in 1984. Ward was a judge on The Next Star which was a Canadian reality television show on YTV.

As a recording artist, Ward charted several singles in Canada between 1976 and 1981. As a songwriter, he achieved notable success with Alannah Myles' recording of "Black Velvet", which reached number 1 on the US charts in 1990. He has also written songs recorded by Diana Ross, Backstreet Boys, Wynonna Judd, Amanda Marshall, Tina Arena, Peter Cetera, Anne Murray and Meredith Brooks, amongst others.

== Early career ==
Born in Toronto, Ontario, Ward began his music career in the early 1970s while attending Trent University in Peterborough, Ontario, where he was a member of the school's campus radio station.

== Broadcasting ==
Some of Ward's early television appearances began in 1978 on the CBC children's series Catch Up, as leader of the show's band. He also played a minor role as a musician in an episode of The Kids of Degrassi Street alongside Alannah Myles in 1984.

Before MuchMusic launched, Ward hosted a weekend, all-night video program called City Limits on CITY-TV in Toronto. On Friday and Saturdays, from midnight to 6 a.m., Ward broke ground as Canada's first "veejay". The show was broadcast from CITY-TV's old Queen Street East studios and apart from playing the latest music videos, hosted guests. Bands such as Bon Jovi and actors like Mike Myers—playing his Wayne's World character long before Saturday Night Live made it famous—added to the prototype of what MuchMusic would become. The show also had "video clip" contest segments which gave winners prizes to special events like movie debuts. Broadcast only in the Toronto region, it was a major way music videos were introduced to the Southern Ontario public. (MTV, the American television network, was not broadcast in Canada due to regulatory laws protecting Canadian content until 2006.) When the Canadian Radio-television and Telecommunications Commission (CRTC) granted a broadcast licence for an all-music channel to begin in 1984, CHUM-CITY won the lucrative rights. The application process to the Commission included Ward's current show as evidence of experience in broadcasting music video entertainment.

During five years on MuchMusic, Ward interviewed artists like Paul McCartney, Tina Turner, Peter Gabriel, Leonard Cohen, and Kate Bush. While with the network, he hosted another show titled City Limits that spotlighted alternative music. Even after his departure from MuchMusic in the late 1980s, he was still involved in the channel off-and-on, most notably as Charles de Camembert, host of the annual Fromage specials.

In 2008, Ward became a judge on YTV's The Next Star for its first four seasons until 2011.

== Songwriting ==
Ward has written many songs for artists such as Hilary Duff, Diana Ross, Backstreet Boys, Wynonna Judd, Amanda Marshall, Tina Arena, Peter Cetera, Anne Murray and Meredith Brooks. His best-known song is the Billboard number one single "Black Velvet", recorded by Alannah Myles. "Black Velvet" was named the No. 49 song in Bob Mersereau's book The Top 100 Canadian Singles. Ward has released several of his own recordings, including the singles "Once in a Longtime" (1977) and "Maybe Your Heart" (1978) (both co-written with his longtime friend Stephen Stohn, executive producer of Degrassi: The Next Generation and Instant Star) and "Boys and Girls" (1987). The music video for "Boys and Girls" featured Alannah Myles, and Mike Myers in an early version of his "Wayne Campbell" character.

The promotional tour for Time Stands Still (released on House of Lords Records/distributed by WEA) included David Wipper on guitar and Billy Idol bassist Steven Webster, and featured pianist Antonio Salci on keyboards.

Starting in 1997, Ward became a member of Ming Tea, the tongue-in-cheek celebrity rock band assembled by fellow Canadian Mike Myers for the first and third Austin Powers films. Group members included Susanna Hoffs and Matthew Sweet and performed the faux-sixties songs "BBC" and "Daddy Wasn't There".

Recent work (much of it in collaboration with Rob Wells Luke McMaster, Greg Johnston and Fred St-Gelais) includes songs for Alexz Johnson in the TV series Instant Star, with soundtrack albums for the four seasons of the show. Along with Rob Wells and Fred St-Gelais, he has worked with Lindsay Robins. Ward songs were featured on two Degrassi – The Next Generation projects, Degrassi Takes Manhattan and Degrassi Goes Hollywood. His songs were featured in Cirque du Soleil's tribute to Vaudeville, 'Banana Shpeel'.

== Bibliography ==
- Mac in the City of Lights (Dundurn Press, 2013)
- Dead Brilliant (Dundurn Press, 2014).

== Discography ==
=== Albums ===
Year	Album
1975	CBC Broadcast Recording – 4 Songs
1978	Spark of Desire
1981	Time Stands Still
1987	Christopher Ward (EP)

=== Singles ===
Year	Single	Chart Positions			Album
Year	Single	CAN AC	CAN	CAN Country	Album
1976	"Lost in a Love Song"	9	69	10	Spark of Desire
1977	"Once in a Long Time"	19	38	—	Spark of Desire
1978	"Maybe Your Heart"	17	47	—	Spark of Desire
1978	"Imagine a Song"	16	96	—	Spark of Desire
1978	"No Time to Cry"	26	74	—	Spark of Desire
1981	"So Long Baby Jane"	17	—	—	Time Stands Still

== See also ==
- List of Canadian musicians
