= Mindy McCready discography =

- Studio albums: 5
- Compilation albums: 6
- Singles: 16
- Music videos: 9

American country music singer Mindy McCready released five studio albums and charted over ten singles on the U.S. Billboard Hot Country Songs charts. Her 1996 debut Ten Thousand Angels was her most commercially successful disc, producing the hit singles "Ten Thousand Angels", "Guys Do It All the Time" and "A Girl's Gotta Do (What a Girl's Gotta Do)".

== Studio albums ==
Title	Album details	Peak chart positions				Certifications (sales threshold)
Title	Album details	US Country	US	CAN Country	CAN	Certifications (sales threshold)
Ten Thousand Angels	Release date: April 30, 1996; Label: BNA Records	5	40	1	93	US: 2× Platinum
If I Don't Stay the Night	Release date: November 4, 1997; Label: BNA Records	12	83	12	—	US: Gold
I'm Not So Tough	Release date: September 14, 1999; Label: BNA Records	17	155	13	—	
Mindy McCready	Release date: March 26, 2002; Label: Capitol Nashville	29	—	—	—	
I'm Still Here	Release date: March 23, 2010; Label: Linus Entertainment	71	—	—	—	
"—" denotes releases that did not chart

== Compilation albums ==
Title	Album details	Peak chart positions		
Title	Album details	US Country	US	CAN Country
CMT Girls' Night Out (with Sara Evans, Martina McBride, and Lorrie Morgan)	Release date: October 12, 1999; Label: BNA Records	30	—	8
Super Hits	Release date: January 11, 2000; Label: BNA Records	46	156	—
Platinum & Gold Collection	Release date: August 19, 2003; Label: RCA Nashville	—	—	—
All American Country	Release date: April 1, 2004; Label: BMG Special Products	—	—	—
All For You	Release date: March 4, 2008; Label: Arist Garage/Capice	—	—	—
Playlist: The Very Best of	Release date: May 21, 2013; Label: Sony Legacy	—	—	—
"—" denotes releases that did not chart

== Singles ==
Year	Single	Peak chart positions				Album
Year	Single	US Country	US	CAN Country	UK	Album
1996	"Ten Thousand Angels"	6	— (Note: "Ten Thousand Angels" did not enter the Billboard Hot 100, but peaked at number 24 on Bubbling Under Hot 100 Singles, which acts as a 25-song extension of the Hot 100.)	13	—	Ten Thousand Angels
1996	"Guys Do It All the Time"	1	72	1	—	Ten Thousand Angels
1996	"Maybe He'll Notice Her Now" (with Richie McDonald)	18	— (Note: "Maybe He'll Notice Her Now" did not enter the Billboard Hot 100, but peaked at number 2 on Bubbling Under Hot 100 Singles, which acts as a 25-song extension of the Hot 100.)	11	—	Ten Thousand Angels
1997	"A Girl's Gotta Do (What a Girl's Gotta Do)"	4	— (Note: "A Girl's Gotta Do (What a Girl's Gotta Do)" did not enter the Billboard Hot 100, but peaked at number 5 on Bubbling Under Hot 100 Singles, which acts as a 25-song extension of the Hot 100.)	4	—	Ten Thousand Angels
1997	"What If I Do"	26	— (Note: "What If I Do" did not enter the Billboard Hot 100, but peaked at number 5 on Bubbling Under Hot 100 Singles, which acts as a 25-song extension of the Hot 100.)	19	—	If I Don't Stay the Night
1998	"You'll Never Know"	19	— (Note: "You'll Never Know" did not enter the Billboard Hot 100, but peaked at number 5 on Bubbling Under Hot 100 Singles, which acts as a 25-song extension of the Hot 100.)	12	—	If I Don't Stay the Night
1998	"The Other Side of This Kiss"	41	—	30	—	If I Don't Stay the Night
1998	"Oh Romeo"	—	—	—	41	If I Don't Stay the Night
1998	"Let's Talk About Love"	68	—	—	—	Country Cares for Kids
1999	"One in a Million" (Note: "One in a Million" is only on the international version of I'm Not So Tough.)	57	—	—	—	I'm Not So Tough
1999	"All I Want Is Everything"	57	—	77	—	I'm Not So Tough
2000	"Scream"	46	—	—	—	Mindy McCready
2002	"Maybe, Maybe Not"	49	—	—	—	Mindy McCready
2002	"Lips Like Yours"	—	—	—	—	Mindy McCready
2008	"I'm Still Here"	—	—	—	—	I'm Still Here
2010	"I Want a Man"	—	—	—	—	I'm Still Here
"—" denotes releases that did not chart

== Guest singles ==
Year	Single	Artist	Album
2009	"Sweeter"	Billy McKnight	Billy McKnight

== Music videos ==
Year	Video	Director
1996	"Ten Thousand Angels"	Jim Hershleder
1996	"Guys Do It All the Time"	Jim Hershleder
1996	"Maybe He'll Notice Her Now" (with Richie McDonald)	Jim Hershleder
1998	"You'll Never Know"	Dean Cain
1998	"The Other Side of This Kiss"	Dean Cain
1998	"Oh Romeo"	Joanna Bailey
1999	"All I Want Is Everything"	Susan Johnson
2000	"Scream"	Roger Pistole
2001	"Maybe, Maybe Not"	
