= Michael Alfonso =

Michael Alfonso may refer to:

- Mike Awesome (Michael Lee "Mike" Alfonso, 1965–2007), American professional wrestler
- Michael Alfonso (murderer) (born 1969), former American fugitive convicted of murder
- Michael Alfonso (politician)
