= Scream (Mindy McCready song) =

Single by Mindy McCready

from the album Mindy McCready
- B-side: "I Just Want Love"
- Released: October 30, 2000
- Genre: Country
- Length: 3:34
- Label: Capitol Nashville
- Songwriter(s): Helen Darling; Jenai
- Producer(s): Billy Joe Walker Jr.

Mindy McCready singles chronology
"All I Want Is Everything" (1999)	"Scream" (2000)	"Maybe, Maybe Not" (2002)

"Scream" is a song by American country music artist Mindy McCready, taken from her eponymous fourth studio album (2002). It was McCready's first single release with Capitol Records Nashville, following her departure from BNA Records. The song was written by Helen Darling and Jenai, with production by Billy Joe Walker Jr. It was released on October 30, 2000, as the lead single from the album. It peaked at number 46 on the Billboard Hot Country Songs chart.

== Critical reception ==
Deborah Evans Price of Billboard gave the song a mixed review, initially starting off positively saying that the song finds McCready in a "sultry, smoky, more mature mode." However, Price comments that McCready "works hard but has a tough time with an obtuse lyric."

== Commercial performance ==
"Scream" debuted on the Billboard Hot Country Songs chart (then titled "Hot Country Singles & Tracks") the week of November 11, 2000, at number 69. The following week, it rose to number 55. The song peaked at number 46 on the chart the week of January 20, 2001, spending 13 weeks in total on the chart.

On the Radio & Records Country Top 50, the song debuted at number 47 on December 8, 2000. The song peaked at number 41 on January 19, 2001. The song spent 6 weeks total on the chart, last charting the week of January 26, 2001.

== Music video ==
Roger Pistole directed the music video for "Scream". The video debuted on CMT the week of October 29, 2000.

== Charts ==
Chart (2000–2001)	Peak position
US Country Top 50 (Radio & Records)	41
US Hot Country Songs (Billboard)	46
