= I Turn to You (album) =

Studio album by Richie McDonald
- Released: June 3, 2008
- Genres: Christian, country
- Label: Stroudavarious
- Producers: Gary Baker; Tommy Lee James; Frank J. Myers

Richie McDonald chronology
If Every Day Could Be Christmas (2007)	I Turn to You (2008)	Slowdown (2010)

I Turn to You is the first solo studio album by American country music artist Richie McDonald, following his departure from the band Lonestar in 2007. It was released on June 3, 2008 by Stroudavarious Records. The album peaked at number 6 on the Billboard Top Christian Albums chart.

== Track listing ==
1. "Carry the Cross" (Richie McDonald, Frank J. Myers, Greg Rausch) – 4:21
2. "I Turn to You" (Jeff Kohen, Myers) – 3:35
3. "Stay with Me Lord" (Myers, Rausch) – 3:41
4. "He's Alive" (McDonald, Myers) – 3:41
5. "Faith" (Jason Eustice, McDonald, Myers) – 3:59
6. "Handle with Prayer" (Steve Diamond, McDonald) – 3:55
7. "What Would He Do" (McDonald, Myers, Rausch) – 4:00
8. "Walls" (Gary Baker, Matt Johnson, Karen Kingsbury, McDonald) – 3:56
9. "Blessed Are the Hands That Give" (Baker, Johnson, McDonald) – 3:51
10. "Hey God" (Tommy Lee James, McDonald) – 3:41
  - acoustic
11. "Measure of a Man" - 4:59 (bonus track on Walmart exclusive edition only)

== Personnel ==
- Tim Akers - Hammond B-3 organ, piano, strings
- Walt Aldridge - acoustic guitar
- Bruce Bouton - steel guitar
- Spady Brannan - bass guitar
- Steve Brewster - drums
- Jim "Moose" Brown - Hammond B-3 organ, piano, strings
- Mickey Buckins - percussion
- Robert Collier - electric guitar
- Eric Darken - percussion
- Billy Davis - background vocals
- Chip Davis - background vocals
- Tommy Harden - drums
- Matt Johnson - background vocals
- Jeff King - electric guitar
- Troy Lancaster - electric guitar
- Paul Leim - drums
- Kevin "Swine" Grantt - bass guitar
- Richie McDonald - lead vocals
- Jerry McPherson - electric guitar
- Greg Morrow - drums
- Jimmy Nichols - Hammond B-3 organ, piano, strings
- Billy Panda - acoustic guitar
- Gary Prim - piano
- Jimmie Lee Sloas - bass guitar
- Doug Stokes - background vocals
- Ilya Toshinsky - acoustic guitar
- Wanda Vick - fiddle
- Jerry Williams - string arrangements, conductor
- John Willis - acoustic guitar

== Chart performance ==
Chart (2008)	Peak position
U.S. Billboard 200	126
U.S. Billboard Top Christian Albums	6
U.S. Billboard Top Country Albums	19
U.S. Billboard Independent Albums	18

== Awards ==
The album was nominated for a Dove Award for Country Album of the Year at the 40th GMA Dove Awards.
