= Maybe He'll Notice Her Now =

Single by Mindy McCready with Richie McDonald

from the album Ten Thousand Angels
- B-side: "Breakin' It" (vinyl); "A Girl's Gotta Do (What a Girl's Gotta Do)" (CD single)
- Released: October 12, 1996
- Recorded: 1995
- Genre: Country
- Length: 3:59
- Label: BNA
- Songwriter: Tim Johnson
- Producer: David Malloy

Mindy McCready singles chronology
"Guys Do It All the Time" (1996)	"Maybe He'll Notice Her Now" (1996)	"A Girl's Gotta Do (What a Girl's Gotta Do)" (1997)

Richie McDonald singles chronology
"Maybe He'll Notice Her Now" (1996)	"God's Still in America" (2007)

"Maybe He'll Notice Her Now" is a song written by Tim Johnson and recorded by American country music artist Mindy McCready featuring Richie McDonald of the band Lonestar, both of whom were signed to BNA Records. It was released in October 1996 as the third single from McCready's double-platinum selling album Ten Thousand Angels. The song reached number 18 on the Billboard Hot Country Singles & Tracks chart.

== Content ==
The song is a ballad about a woman who leaves in order to get her man's attention.

== Critical reception ==
Deborah Evans Price, of Billboard magazine reviewed the song favorably, saying that McCready delivers the song with "warmth and conviction." She goes on to call the lyric "poignant" and states that the performance is "credible" and "beautifully complemented" by Richie McDonald.

== Music video ==
The music video was directed by Jim Hershleder and premiered in October 1996.

== Chart performance ==
"Maybe He'll Notice Her Now" debuted at number 67 on the U.S. Billboard Hot Country Singles & Tracks for the week of October 12, 1996.

Chart (1996–1997)	Peak position
Canada Country Singles (RPM)	11
US Bubbling Under Hot 100 (Billboard)	2
US Hot Country Songs (Billboard)	18
