= What If I Do =

Single by Mindy McCready

from the album If I Don't Stay the Night
- B-side: "If I Don't Stay the Night"
- Released: September 15, 1997
- Recorded: 1997
- Genre: Country-pop; country rock
- Length: 3:13 (album version); 3:08 (radio remix)
- Label: BNA
- Songwriters: David Malloy; Ed Hill; Mark D. Sanders
- Producer: David Malloy

Mindy McCready singles chronology
"A Girl's Gotta Do (What a Girl's Gotta Do)" (1997)	"What If I Do" (1997)	"You'll Never Know" (1998)

"What If I Do" is a song by American country music artist Mindy McCready, taken from her second studio album If I Don't Stay the Night (1997). Written by David Malloy, Ed Hill and Mark D. Sanders, and produced by Malloy, it was released on September 15, 1997, as the lead single from the album.

== Content ==
The song is in the key of D major with a moderate tempo and a vocal range of A3-D5. In it, the female narrator questions whether or not to pursue a further relationship with her date.

== Critical reception ==
Dan Milliken of the blog Country Universe wrote that "McCready gives a fantastically entertaining performance, speak-singing her lines with a bold campiness that most other gals wouldn’t dare."

== Charts ==
"What If I Do" peaked at number 26 on the US Hot Country Songs chart.

Chart (1997)	Peak position
Canada Country Singles (RPM)	19
US Bubbling Under Hot 100 (Billboard)	2
US Hot Country Songs (Billboard)	26
