= You'll Never Know (Kim Richey song) =

Single by Mindy McCready

from the album If I Don't Stay the Night
- B-side: "Long, Long Time"
- Released: January 5, 1998
- Recorded: 1997
- Genre: Country
- Length: 4:04 (album version); 3:39 (Remix)
- Label: BNA
- Songwriters: Kim Richey, Angelo Petraglia
- Producer: David Malloy

Mindy McCready singles chronology
"What If I Do" (1997)	"You'll Never Know" (1998)	"The Other Side of This Kiss" (1998)

"You'll Never Know" is a song written by Kim Richey and Angelo Petraglia, and recorded by Richey for her 1995 debut album Kim Richey. The song was later recorded by Mindy McCready for her 1997 album If I Don't Stay the Night. McCready's version was released as a single on January 20, 1998 and reached number 19 on the Billboard Hot Country Singles & Tracks chart.

== Content ==
The song examines the emotions of a woman who is determined to maintain her emotions after a break up.

== Critical reception ==
Deborah Evans Price, of Billboard magazine reviewed the song favorably, saying that it shows her "maturation as a vocalist." She goes on to call the song "well-written."

== Music video ==
The music video was directed by Dean Cain and premiered in 1998.

== Chart performance ==
"You'll Never Know" debuted at number 52 on the U.S. Billboard Hot Country Singles & Tracks for the week of January 17, 1998. It eventually peaked at #19, becoming McCready's last Top 20 hit.

Chart (1998)	Peak position
Canada Country Singles (RPM)	12
US Bubbling Under Hot 100 (Billboard)	2
US Hot Country Songs (Billboard)	19

=== Year-end charts ===
Chart (1998)	Position
Canada Country Tracks (RPM)	84
