= Maybe, Maybe Not =

- Mindy McCready cover

Single by Mindy McCready

from the album Mindy McCready
- Released: January 14, 2002
- Recorded: 2001
- Studio: Little City Studio; Midtown Tone & Volume; (Nashville, Tennessee)
- Genre: Country pop
- Length: 3:38
- Label: Capitol Nashville
- Songwriters: Mila Mason; Jim Collins
- Producers: Mike Clute; Bobby Huff

Mindy McCready singles chronology
"Scream" (2000)	"Maybe, Maybe Not" (2002)	"Lips Like Yours" (2002)

"Maybe, Maybe Not" is a song by American country music artist Mindy McCready, taken from her eponymous fourth studio album (2002). The track was written by Mila Mason and Jim Collins and produced by Mike Clute and Bobby Huff, one of two tracks on the album not produced by Billy Joe Walker Jr. It was released on January 14, 2002, as the second single from the album and became a minor hit upon its release. Mason would record a version of her own and released it as a single in 2003 from her album Stained Glass Window, although hers did not chart.

== Critical reception ==
Ray Waddell of Billboard magazine, in his review of the album, gave it a mixed review, calling it "sonically busy yet remain[s] interchangeable and [a] vaporous girly anthem(s)."

== Music video ==
A music video for "Maybe, Maybe Not" was filmed in 2001. It began airing in February 2002 to Great American Country. The video takes place entirely in a laundromat as McCready is shown sitting on top of washing machines and being soaked in bubbles.

== Chart performance ==
"Maybe, Maybe Not" debuted on the US Billboard Hot Country Songs chart the week of February 2, 2002 at number 56. The track reached a peak position of number 49 in its fourth week on the chart. It spent 9 weeks in total on the chart and as of 2024, remains McCready's final single to chart on the country charts.

On Radio & Records's country chart, the track debuted at number 50 on February 1, 2002. It rose to number 49 the following week while simultaneously debuting at number 48 on the Country Indicator chart. It peaked at number 45 in its third week on February 15, 2002. Its final week was on February 22, 2002, at number 49.

== Personnel ==
Taken from the album booklet.

- Larry Beaird – acoustic guitar
- Duncan Mullins – bass
- Russ Pahl – dobro
- Bobby Huff – drums, backing vocals
- Dale Oliver – electric guitar
- Aubrey Haynie – fiddle
- Reese Wynans – organ

== Charts ==
=== Mindy McCready version ===
Chart (2002)	Peak position
US Hot Country Songs (Billboard)	49

== Release history ==
Release dates and formats for "Maybe, Maybe Not"
Region	Date	Version	Format(s)	Label(s)	Ref.
United States	January 14, 2002	Mindy McCready	Country radio	Capitol Nashville	
United States	August 25, 2003	Mila Mason	Country radio	Twinbeat; Quarterback	
