= All I Want Is Everything (Mindy McCready song) =

Single by Mindy McCready

from the album I'm Not So Tough
- Released: August 30, 1999
- Studio: Emerald Sound Studios (Nashville, TN)
- Genre: Country; honky tonk
- Length: 2:45 (album version); 2:42 (radio edit)
- Label: BNA
- Songwriters: Matraca Berg; Marshall Chapman
- Producer: Billy Joe Walker, Jr.

Mindy McCready singles chronology
"One in a Million" (1999)	"All I Want Is Everything" (1999)	"Scream" (2000)

"All I Want Is Everything" is a song by American country music recording artist Mindy McCready, released as the second and final single from her third studio album I'm Not So Tough (1999) by BNA Records. The song was written by Matraca Berg and Marshall Chapman, with Billy Joe Walker Jr. providing production for the song. It was released on August 30, 1999, where it would achieve little commercial success. Just a month after the release of its parent album, McCready would be dropped by BNA, marking this her final single released for the label.

== Content ==
"All I Want Is Everything" is a "rockabillyish big beat new wave"-inspired up-beat country song. A "quasi-feminist, modern-girl" song, the song's narrator sings of everything materialistic she wants in a relationship. McCready said of the song in an interview with the Portsmouth Daily Times, "When I first heard it, the lyric reflected so much of my personality. 'All I want is everything' is something I've actually said before."

== Critical reception ==
Billboard, in their review for the album, gave "All I Want Is Everything" a positive review, calling it a "Buddy Holly-esque" song and a "galloping tale of braggadocio." Radio & Records in their review also noted the similarities to Buddy Holly.

== Chart performance ==
"All I Want Is Everything" debuted at number 72 on the US Billboard Hot Country Songs chart the week of August 21, 1999. It hit its peak position of number 57 on October 2, 1999, spending 9 weeks in total on the chart.

== Music video ==
McCready in the music video for "All I Want is Everything".

Susan Johnson directed the video for the song in Los Angeles, California. The video mostly takes place in front of green screens with the exception of a few scenes like the opening shot where McCready is in a rural area on a hill where a man serves her a drink. It was added to CMT's playlists for the week of September 12, 1999.

== Charts ==
Weekly chart performance for "All I Want Is Everything"
Chart (1999)	Peak position
Canada Country Singles (RPM)	77
US Hot Country Songs (Billboard)	58
