= I (Almost) Got Away with It =

American true crime TV series (2010–2016)

- Genre: Documentary
- Narrated by: Bill Ratner
- Country of origin: United States
- No. of seasons: 8
- No. of episodes: 93

Production
- Executive producers: David Frank; Thomas Cutler
- Running time: 42 minutes (excluding commercials)
- Production company: Indigo Films

Original release
- Network: Investigation Discovery
- Release: January 12, 2010 – July 15, 2016

I (Almost) Got Away with It is an American television documentary series on Investigation Discovery. It debuted in 2010, ending after eight seasons, in 2016. The series profiles true stories of people who have committed crimes, and have avoided arrest or capture, but ultimately end up being caught. The series was created by executive producer David M. Frank of Indigo Films.

== Episodes ==
Season	Episodes	Originally released	
Season	Episodes	First released	Last released
1	13	January 12, 2010	April 6, 2010
2	13	October 26, 2010	January 18, 2011
3	13	April 12, 2011	July 19, 2011
4	14	October 6, 2011	January 5, 2012
5	13	April 11, 2012	July 31, 2012
6	8	June 24, 2013	August 12, 2013
7	8	June 2, 2014	July 28, 2014
8	10	May 13, 2016	July 15, 2016

=== Season 1 ===
No. overall	No. in season	Title	Original release date
1	1	"Got Remarried"	January 12, 2010
Michael McGuffey murders his estranged wife in a parking lot in Mt. Vernon, Washington, in front of several witnesses and flees to Texas and from there to Mexico City. After overstaying his visa, McGuffey is returned to the United States, where he receives a 26-year prison sentence in a guilty plea.
2	2	"Got Dumped"	January 19, 2010
Michael Alfonso shoots his ex-girlfriend Sumanear Yang in the head. Nine years later, he shot another girlfriend, Genoveva Velasquez, and fled to Puerto Vallarta, Mexico, finding a job as a bartender. A tip received by the FBI from a man who knew Alfonso put police on a hot trail towards Alfonso's arrest. He was caught going to a barbershop by the FBI, who sent him back to the United States. He pleaded guilty to all three murder charges, and was sentenced to life in prison.
3	3	"Got No Fingerprints"	January 26, 2010
Jerry Bowen, a drywall contractor in Huntsville, Alabama, murders his ex-wife. Her body is discovered two months later in a river, wrapped in plastic and chains. During his trial, Bowen is convicted, but he continues to remain free until sentencing due to his clean record. Before his sentencing, he escapes to Reno, Nevada in a used car and hides under various false identities. Authorities place Bowen on a national crime show. The brother and sister-in-law of the woman he is dating recognize him and call the FBI. He is fingerprinted, sent back to Alabama, and sentenced to life in prison without parole.
4	4	"Got a Video Rental Store"	February 2, 2010
In 1975, Michael Wayne Brown is one of a trio of teens committing a string of burglaries. One night, they are in the process of burglarizing an insurance office when they are surprised to see the owner appear. Brown shoots and kills the owner. In prison, Brown marries a woman named Donna and escapes with her help. They flee to Dayton, Ohio, where they work low-wage jobs until they have enough money to open a video rental store. Brown is featured on the national crime show Unsolved Mysteries. Somebody recognizes him and calls the FBI. When Brown realizes the FBI are hot on their trail, he voluntarily returns to prison, and Donna reunites with her family.
5	5	"Got Two Homes in Mexico"	February 9, 2010
Gonzalo Martinez shoots three people in gang-related violence and is sentenced to 48 years in prison for the attempted murders. Martinez and three other inmates escape and flee to Denver. Martinez makes his way to Mexico, where he assumes a new identity and turns to drug dealing. He is finally arrested in Mexico and extradited back to the United States, where he returns to prison with 12 years tacked onto his sentence.
6	6	"Got the Wrong Four People Killed"	February 16, 2010
Dorsey Sanders III and Scott Burnside hire John Barrett to kill Dorsey's mother Joanne. Barrett botches the hit, instead killing Joanne's new fiancé and three workers in the process of renovating the house. Joanne's son turns himself in voluntarily; Burnside goes on the run. His mother Susan gets him a flight to Washington, DC, where he attempts to start a new life. He changes his appearance, gets a fake passport, and flees to the South Pacific island of Rarotonga. He is arrested after his sister Cheryl decides to cooperate with police. He is returned to Florida and receives four life sentences without parole. Sanders stands trial for the murders a decade later and is acquitted.
7	7	"Got Caught in the Shower"	February 23, 2010
Richard Garber murders his neighbor Janio Moraes over a dispute about money. Garber and his girlfriend Anna then head to Las Vegas. Once in Vegas, Anna reports to police there that he is a murderer, but before the police have a chance to arrest him, Anna has a change of heart and tips him off. Garber heads west to San Jose, California, where he rents an apartment and lays low. He frequently travels back to Vegas, where Anna gives him more cash. On one of his trips back, he is captured after his cousin tips off the police.
8	8	"Got to Sing Karaoke"	March 2, 2010
Joe Crouch of Memphis, Tennessee is a compulsive gambler whose addiction has led him to write bad checks for over $80,000. When he discovers that he is facing criminal charges, he confesses his crimes to his wife. Later that night, while his wife is sleeping, he shoots her to death and flees to Florida. Over the next several months, he finances his life by robbing convenience stores and later banks. When a friend of his recognizes him on a wanted poster, Crouch is arrested in his Daytona Beach condo for the murder and the 40 robberies. Crouch pleads guilty and gets life in prison.
9	9	"Got Revenge"	March 9, 2010
Drug enforcer Marshall Brown is sentenced to life in prison for murdering a witness scheduled to testify against him. After spending 16 years as a model prisoner, he escapes and reenters the drug trade. One day, he runs into Steve Calhoun, the man who originally betrayed him. He shoots Calhoun at point-blank range, beats Calhoun's friend, and leaves him for dead. The others in the van flee. Using various disguises and clever subterfuge, Brown stays on the run for several years. He is arrested by surprise one morning as he is about to head to work. Brown pleads no contest to the murder of Calhoun and is sentenced to 20 years.
10	10	"Got to Rob Banks"	March 16, 2010
Joe Loya lives a double life as a charming man, working as a cook at a restaurant, playing golf, and wearing expensive designer clothes. His friends think highly of him. Meanwhile, he is secretly a career bank robber whom police have dubbed the "Beirut bandit" due to his dark complexion. One day, he is given a tracking pack in a robbery that allows cops to track his location. Police make a felony stop of him and he is arrested. But he is so charming he is allowed to post bail. Once out on bail, he is committing more robberies. His girlfriend agrees to cooperate with police and a sting is arranged on a college campus. He is sentenced to 8½ years in prison. Once out of prison after the sentence, he straightens out his life, gets a career, marries, has children, and forms a good relationship with his family.
11	11	"Got to Go to Canada"	March 23, 2010
Scott Freeburg has been in and out of prison since age 18. While working as an enforcer for a drug dealer, he gets into a fight with his victim, whom he shoots to death with the victim's gun. He then flees to British Columbia, Canada where he begins a new life working in construction. After two years, he has trouble finding work and joins a Vietnamese-Canadian counterfeiting gang as an enforcer. One day, a victim of the gang identifies him as his attempted killer. Vancouver Police arrest him, run his fingerprints with the FBI, and discover he is one of the top American fugitives. He is extradited and sentenced to life in prison for the murder.
12	12	"Got a Gun Made Out of Toilet Paper"	March 30, 2010
Kerry Silvers is serving a 61-year sentence for robbery and other crimes. Four years into his sentence, he and two other inmates escape in a stolen car. Silvers separates from the others, steals another car, and drives it to Louisville, Kentucky, where he has family. He finds work loading vending machines for several weeks until he receives a tip that officers are on his trail. He flees to New Orleans, then Brownsville, Texas, and finally Mexico, where he finds employment near the border growing marijuana for several months. He falls in love, gets married, and discovers a talent for fixing computers. As Silvers' career advances, authorities close in on him.
13	13	"Got to Get Bike Parts"	April 6, 2010
Marvin Carson is a member of a motorcycle gang. One day, a friend who broke up with her boyfriend, a rival biker gang member, asks Carson to go to her ex's house and retrieve her bike. He does so. When the rival biker threatens Carson's friends, Carson shoots one of his rivals. Witnesses identify Carson as the killer and he goes on the run. At one time, he flees to Shreveport, Louisiana, where he attempts to begin a life there and jog to lose weight. But his jogging draws suspicion from local police. When he starts to feel uncomfortable, he moves in with his brother in Atlanta, where he stays for a while and lives off the money from the sale of his bike. He eventually returns to Florida, where police catch Carson while walking to buy a newspaper.

=== Season 2 ===
No. overall	No. in season	Title	Original release date
14	1	"Got Caught By a Cougar"	October 26, 2010
Robert Spencer, a Jacksonville drug dealer, is known for his temper. One day, he gets angry at his girlfriend and fires a series of shots into her window with the intention of scaring her. She is hit and dies. Spencer, afraid of what he is facing, asks a friend for a ride out of town. After hiding in Orlando, San Diego, and Tijuana, he ends up working on a tour boat in Cabo San Lucas. More than 1½ years after the murder, his roommate's mother finds that Spencer is wanted. Upon his return from the beach, Spencer is surprised by an arrest team. He receives 32 years in prison.
15	2	"Got to Roll the Dice"	November 2, 2010
Phillip Anthony Williams of Albuquerque murders his ex-girlfriend as she attempts to get into her car after work. When a local news report names him as the prime suspect, Williams flees to Denver, St. Louis, Brookville, Pennsylvania, Philadelphia, and finally checks into a drug rehab center in Lancaster, Pennsylvania run by the Amish. He is featured on America's Most Wanted. Several leads come in from the Lancaster area. On a hunch, investigators search for him in Philadelphia, where he is arrested and sentenced to 18 years in prison.
16	3	"Got a Dead Man's ID"	November 9, 2010
Michael Hess of Tampa, Florida is sentenced to 35 years in prison for a series of convenience store robberies. After seven years as a model prisoner, he escapes and catches a bus to California. Unable to find employment, he calls the mother of an ex-girlfriend, who buys him a bus ticket to Ocala, Florida. Once there he assumes a new identity, gets a job as a cook at a restaurant, and spends the next 20 years with his girlfriend Ellen. He is arrested at work and forced to return to prison to serve the remainder of his sentence.
17	4	"Got Caught Via Email"	November 16, 2010
Edward Roberson is sentenced to five years in prison for a string of motor vehicle thefts. A failed escape attempt earns him another 10 years. He befriends two other inmates, Keith Carter and Marty Finney, and the three escape together. Carter makes off in a stolen truck, while Roberson and Finney find civilian clothes in a dumpster, then walk a great distance along a railroad. They steal another car and drive it to Colorado, burglarizing homes along the way. In Colorado, they arrive at a motel and find a key card which operates a room that is under construction. They stay in this room. Finney emails a friend from the hotel's computer, and the friend calls police, who find the pair in the process of writing a demand note for a planned bank robbery.
18	5	"Got Plastic Surgery"	November 22, 2010
Courtenay Savage shoots into the home of her former friend and business partner three times, nearly inflicting life-threatening damage. She is charged with attempted murder. While out on bail, she uses the ID of a friend, goes to Mexico, and has plastic surgery. She then flies to New Jersey and hooks up with a former boyfriend. Later, she moves to Oklahoma, where she lives for some time, before her former boyfriend lands a job in Houston, where she lives with him. She is later apprehended there.
19	6	"Got Raps"	November 30, 2010
Recently paroled Raymond Ross steals a car and runs over its owner, teenaged Troy Bowman. Ross takes the stolen car to his hometown of Humboldt, Tennessee, where he strips it for parts. Police see Ross trying to transfer the parts into the truck and become suspicious, but Ross talks his way out of it. The following day, the dashcam video of this event leads police to identify Ross as the suspect who ran over Bowman. Lexington police go to Humboldt to look for Ross, but he has left town and traveled 140 miles to Cape Girardeau, Missouri, where he sells drugs and robs rival dealers. Lexington police arrange for Ross to be featured on a national TV show. A friend tips him off that he is on TV and makes plans to leave town, but before he has a chance, police arrest him at his new girlfriend's house in the middle of the night.
20	7	"Got a Lot of Pot"	December 7, 2010
Marijuana smuggler Steve Lamb and his crew are arrested in the largest marijuana bust in US history. All participants receive 20 years in prison, but are paroled after two years. Lamb continues smuggling until he is charged with violating parole. He makes bail of $30,000 easily, then takes the millions of dollars he has stashed in his mother's backyard and flees to Venezuela on a fake passport. He makes frequent entries into the United States to visit his mother and friends, but officers can never catch him. With his girlfriend, he divides his time between South America and California. One day, he is arrested in California during a sting, extradited to Florida, and serves 34 months for the parole violation.
21	8	"Got Shot Above a Deli"	December 14, 2010
Manhattan drug dealer and aspiring rapper Sean Salley plans to rob a rival dealer with his accomplice, Andre Smith. The pair go to an apartment located above the Carnegie Deli and shoot all of the occupants execution style in order to leave no witnesses behind. Two of the victims survive the shooting and one calls 911. Salley catches a bus to New Orleans, where he hides in motels and friends' houses. One day, he asks an acquaintance to wire him money. The acquaintance instead calls police. Police try and fail to arrest him when he retrieves the wire transfer. Salley makes plans to leave, and assuming that buses and trains are already being watched, he hitchhikes to Miami, where police find him. Salley and Smith are sentenced to 120 years in prison.
22	9	"Got to Lock and Load"	December 21, 2010
The Republic of Texas is a militia group that believes the state of Texas is being held illegally by the United States and supports Texas seceding from the Union. After a contentious hostage situation, police raid the compound for illegal firearms. Two ROT members, Richard Keyes III and Mike Madsen, flee into nearby woods. Police dogs reach Madsen and police give orders to fire. Madsen is shot to death. Keyes takes refuge with ROT branches in New Mexico and Houston, but is kicked out for planning a terrorist attack. Keyes contacts his family and tells his exact location. His family calls the FBI. Keyes is sentenced to 90 years in prison for aggravated kidnapping.
23	10	"Got to Pick Up a Hooker"	December 28, 2010
Drug enforcer Dallas Slettvet gets into a fight at a home where he is sent and stabs the victim to death with his own knife. Realizing he has taken a life, he panics. He remains in town, hiding out in the homes of other drug addicts and finally his sister-in-law's house. After being kicked out of a club, he spends the night asleep in an alley and wakes up the next morning far from his safe house. He hails a cab and asks for a ride back, then passes out in the cab. The cabbie then starts to rob him, and he fights with the cabbie, who pushes him out of the cab. The cabbie calls police. Police spot him nearby and arrest him, leading to the end of his run.
24	11	"Got a Death Certificate"	January 4, 2011
James Clement is selling a boat, and is murdered by two men, the Ellis brothers, posing as potential buyers. The Ellises drive the boat to the Bahamas, where drug dealer Anthony Ragno will sell it on the black market. Once Ragno learns the boat was associated with a murder, he flees the Bahamas and obtains honest employment in Texas. All three are found and prosecuted. When Ragno finds out they will all be in the same prison, he goes on the run again. Ragno, now known as James Collins, becomes an overseas drug dealer in the West Indies. He has occasional brushes with the law and most of the time is arrested under the name James Collins, but one time gives his real name. US Marshals investigating Ragno's cold case find records that he is dead, but are suspicious due to the lack of a death certificate. They find an arrest record under his name years later. They visit many of his last known addresses until they receive a tip to his whereabouts. He serves his original one-year sentence and returns to society.
25	12	"Got a Family Coming After Me"	January 11, 2011
Erick Quesada is wanted for the murder of his best friend turned enemy Michael Newhouse in a drive-by shooting in the suburbs of San Antonio. The day after the shooting, Quesada's mother takes him to a relative in Mexico to stay. Police continue to search the San Antonio area for him until they receive a letter tipping them off he is in Mexico. Federales come to the address to learn he has departed. San Antonio police are helpless without the successful capture by the Federales. After four years of dodging law enforcement, Quesada is captured and sentenced to 75 years in prison.
26	13	"Got Ninth Place at Poker"	January 18, 2011
After four years of marriage, 25-year-old Randall Zandstra and his wife separate. When he finds her with a new boyfriend, Zastra shoots the new boyfriend and flees. He attempts to start over in Atlanta, Las Vegas (where he takes ninth place in a poker competition), Atlantic City, and New York City, but always ends up fleeing his criminal past. United States Marshals find him in Colorado, and are about to arrest him when he flees by car. A high speed chase ensues, his car flips, and he is ejected. After recovering from his injuries, he is sentenced to 9 years in prison for theft from a former employer. The attempted murder charge is dismissed on a technicality.

=== Season 3 ===
No. overall	No. in season	Title	Original release date
27	1	"Got a Country Legend's Tour Bus"	April 12, 2011
Career criminal Christopher Daniel Gay hears his mother is dying and escapes custody again to see her. After spending the night hiding in the woods, Gay steals a pickup truck, abandons it a few hours later, and then steals a Walmart truck. An officer spots Gay getting into the Walmart truck and gives chase. Gay manages to escape and cons his way into a secured lot where musicians park their tour buses. He then makes off in the bus belonging to Crystal Gayle and drives it to Daytona Speedway, where he cons his way to a VIP pass and enjoys a day at the races. On the way out, he is captured when suspicious officers run the plates of the bus.
28	2	"Got That Tough Girl Look"	April 19, 2011
Following the murder of Earl Mason in a Daytona Beach motel, the three perpetrators, Jason Bowman, William McMinn, and Juanita Liebman, flee to Texas. During a routine traffic stop, Liebman, a passenger, is the only one who can produce ID. Bowman is already a suspect in the murder, so he is booked and extradited. Liebman already has burglary warrants in Virginia, and she is booked on them, but she is released after Virginia refuses to accept the extradition. She later catches a bus to Virginia, where her mother lives, where she briefly reunites with her. To stay on the run, she hides out for a while at motels in North Carolina, but after wanted posters circulate the town, she returns to her mother's residence. U.S. Marshals search her mother's residence, where they find her hiding behind boxes.
29	3	"Got a Bad Temper"	April 26, 2011
While awaiting trial in Oklahoma, Aurlieas Dante McClarty robs a taco shop and uses the money to flee to Los Angeles, then Cleveland, Orlando, Laurel, Maryland, and finally North Carolina. Along the way, he supports himself with identity theft and counterfeiting. At one point, McClarty becomes an informant for the US Secret Service, helping to catch other counterfeiters. During this time, the FBI finds out McClarty is responsible for a murder in Orlando and places him on their most wanted list. The FBI is tipped off when McClarty sells a car he had rented and never returned, and the buyer is unable to register the car, as it has been reported stolen. McClarty notices a plumbing truck parked near his house and suspects this is a cover for a vehicle filled with FBI agents. He attempts to flee through the back gate, but is swarmed by FBI agents, and his run is over.
30	4	"Got to Escape in Underwear"	May 3, 2011
After spending three days in a holding cell at the Unicoi County, Tennessee jail, Ricky McCurry begs the lone officer on duty for a shower. The officer opens his cell door while McCurry is dressed in nothing but underpants. McCurry bolts from the facility and finds clothes in a trash can. He hides out with his uncle and aunt in North Carolina until the charges are dropped. Once home, he is caught for drunk driving and flees to Florida. McCurry's alcoholism leads him to armed robbery, more drunk driving, and more escapes from jail. After serving a total of 25 years for his various offenses, McCurry moves back home and lives with his mother.
31	5	"Got a Pen Pal"	May 10, 2011
Brenda Wynn, a drug dealer in Daytona Beach, is robbed by the man she had employed as a driver. Wynn runs him over and leaves him for dead. She is arrested for the battery and posts bail. Before her court hearing, she contacts a pen pal named Glenn from the time she previously spent in prison, and arranges for him to pick her up and take her to his hometown of Williamsport, Pennsylvania. Before leaving, Wynn wants her friend David to accompany them. Once in Williamsport, the three share an apartment. One day, while driving to pick up Glenn from work, she is pulled over for suspicion of drunk driving. She cannot produce ID, and she gives police an alias, making them suspicious. When police take her into custody, they find her ID on her, showing them her real name. Police discover outstanding warrants and Wynn is extradited to Florida, where she is sentenced to two years in prison.
32	6	"Got to Get Revenge"	May 31, 2011
Scott Eizember flees his home state of Michigan after violating a restraining order. He settles in Tulsa, Oklahoma and begins a relationship with a woman named Kathy. When Eizember's violent tendencies destroy this relationship as well, he gets revenge by attacking Kathy's son and mother. Eizember goes on the run and police launch the largest manhunt in Oklahoma history. After a month, Eizember carjacks a vehicle and forces the driver to drive to Arkansas, and then to Texas, where the husband shoots Eizember three times, wounding him. Eizember beats the couple and takes their car. Eizember is stopped by an officer for a routine traffic stop, where police learn the vehicle has been stolen. After recovering, Eizember is extradited to Oklahoma and sentenced to death.
33	7	"Got to Run With My Buddy"	June 7, 2011
In the Clovis, New Mexico jail, Larry McClendon awaits trial for murder. When his childhood friend Michael England comes to jail on a probation violation, the two plan to escape together. When the guards are not looking, they sneak through a large pipe using a stolen key. They come out on the roof and spend several days making a hole in the roof. Once complete, they and six other inmates escape through the hole. The pair go to a friend, who drives them while drunk to a family member's house, where they get civilian clothes and cash. Police are searching for them while they hide in mud. They then find an abandoned building where they hide for several days until they get a ride to Amarillo, Texas. England later returns to Clovis and is captured. McClendon stays in Amarillo, where he is captured by United States Marshals.
34	8	"Got Caught in a Love Triangle"	June 14, 2011
Henry Lee Marshall of Tampa, Florida, stalks his former girlfriend Martha Leathers, who now has a long-term relationship and five children with George O'Neill. When O'Neill and Leathers make plans to move away from Tampa, Marshall murders O'Neill and flees to Dallas, where he takes on the alias "Bennie Thomas" and gets a job as a shoemaker. One year later, he returns to Florida briefly before moving to Atlanta, where he lives out of a van, shining shoes of passersby for income. Several years later, Leathers spots him and phones police. Police send numerous officers to the area in search of him and find him. Marshall insists he is Bennie Thomas and this is a mistake, but Leathers positively identifies him. His trial is delayed for two years due to a stroke he has, but he is later convicted of the murder and sentenced to life.
35	9	"Got a Boyfriend to Support"	June 21, 2011
Steven Jay Russell is fired from his food service job for being gay. He turns to low-level fraud and is sentenced to six months behind bars. After just one month, he escapes and flees to Florida, where he is captured three weeks before his boyfriend dies of AIDS. Upon release, Russell cons his way into a CFO job that pays $85,000/year despite having only a GED. He embezzles $800,000 from the company and receives 40 years in prison, but escapes and makes his way to Phillip Morris, a boyfriend he met while in prison for the fraud case. United States Marshals capture Russell in Biloxi, Mississippi. In prison, Russell fakes having AIDS and is released to a nursing home on medical parole, where he fakes his own death. He tries to free Morris, but ends up fleeing to Florida, where he is captured again. He is now serving 140 years in maximum security on 23-hour lockdown.
36	10	"Got to Impersonate a Guard"	June 28, 2011
While working at an Albertsons in Dallas, Dennis Wayne Hope formulates a plan to rob his employer. By posing as an employee of an armored truck company, Hope collects cash deposits from several Albertsons in the area. After being fired from his job, he turns to armed robberies of other Albertsons until his girlfriend reports him to police and he is sentenced to 80 years in prison. Hope escapes and makes his way to Memphis, where he uses stolen cash to buy a used car and rent an apartment. When his cash supply runs dry, Hope travels back to Dallas and robs three more Albertsons stores, netting $100,000. When Memphis police find the truck Hope used to escape from prison, they realize Hope is living in Memphis and commuting to Dallas to commit robberies. By tracing phone records, police contact Hope's girlfriend's sister, who is shocked to learn he is a fugitive. She invites him to a bar later that evening, where agents capture him. He is sentenced to 140 years in solitary confinement.
37	11	"Got Shot in the Leg"	July 5, 2011
Four friends rob the Jade East restaurant in Memphis, Tennessee, from which one of them has just been fired. During the robbery, they kill the owners, Arthur and Amy Lee, along with employee Kai Yin Chuey, and steal the Lees' jewelry. The sole survivor is 77-year-old Ging Sam Lee, who tells police the story through a translator. While the other three robbers have left town, Duc Phuoc Doan stayed to finish high school. When Doan is taken for questioning, he admits his participation and identifies the three other suspects: Kong Chung Bounnam, Heck Van Tran, and Hung Van Chung. Van Tran is arrested while staying in Houston and admits his guilt to police. Bounnam leaves his uncle's residence in North Carolina and heads to Toronto, Canada, where he is arrested and extradited back to his hometown. Bounnam is sentenced to life plus 25 years for robbery. Van Tran is sentenced to death. Van Chung receive two consecutive life sentences. Doan serves 10 years for his cooperation before being deported back to Vietnam.
38	12	"Got to Hide in a Swamp"	July 12, 2011
After spending 10 months in jail, Dominick Reddick escapes from a transport van after it breaks down along a Florida highway. He hides in the swamp for six hours before hitching a ride to Jacksonville. Reddick's brother drives him to Chatham County, Georgia and drops him off on the side of U.S. Highway 17, where he is spotted by US Marshals. Reddick runs into an apartment complex parking lot and then into the woods. After hiding out in the swamps, search dogs catch Reddick's scent and he is returned to the same prison from which he escaped.
39	13	"Got to Work on a Crab Boat"	July 19, 2011
After robbing a bank in Florida, Kenneth "Speedy" Raulerson flees to Alaska to and gets a job working on a crab boat for a season. Some time later, he begins to miss his family and returns to Florida, planning to keep a low profile and avoid the police. Although he is spotted by police informants shortly after his arrival, Raulerson manages to evade capture for the next six years.

=== Season 4 ===
No. overall	No. in season	Title	Original release date
40	1	"Love on the Run"	October 6, 2011
41	2	"Got to Ride the Rails"	October 6, 2011
In Miami, Florida, Ricky Alan Sleight and his roommate get into an argument. Sleight kills his roommate, sets the man's body on fire, and drives the victim's car to his parents' house in North Carolina. After a brief visit with his parents, he abandons the car, then catches a bus to Chicago. There, he learns about freighthopping. He catches a series of freight trains to Bellingham, Washington and finally to Oceanside, California, where he decides to take a break from traveling. He joins the local homeless community and becomes well known there, including participation in church services. His case makes national news, and a homeless man in the area reports his sighting to local police. A search for him around the town ensues, and he is located.
42	3	"Got to Wear a Pink Shirt"	October 13, 2011
Abraham Cavazos heads to a birthday party dressed in a pink and blue striped shirt. During the party, Rogelio Terrazas and his friends call Cavazos a "faggot". Cavazos first ignores this harassment, but when Terrazas continues to harass him, Cavazos shoots Terrazas twice and he dies. Cavazos and his friends leave the party to go on the run. He meets a gang member, who recommends he go to Ciudad Juárez. Cavazos gets a girlfriend to drive him to Juarez, where he rents a cheap apartment, and makes money by stealing and selling drugs. When officers catch up with him, Cavazos catches a bus to Torreón, where he starts a new life and a family. He spends almost a year there when officers identify him by his tattoos and arrest him. He is extradited and subsequently sentenced to 28 years behind bars.
43	4	"Got to Silence a Witness"	October 20, 2011
44	5	"Got to Copy Movies"	October 27, 2011
Parolee Johnnyray Gasca makes a living by taking a camcorder into theaters where martial arts films are being shown, copying his recordings, and selling them on the streets of New York. This is legal, since these foreign movies are not copyrighted. After his parole is finished, he tries doing the same thing in Los Angeles, where he is caught and his equipment is confiscated. He is charged with federal copyright violations and extortion and is facing 28 years in prison. He is held without bail, but is allowed to leave jail for a few hours a day under the custody of his attorney to retrieve evidence. During one of his trips out of jail, he and his girlfriend escape to Florida, where he continues his operation before being turned in by their roommate. He is later convicted on all counts and receives seven years in prison before his release.
45	6	"Got to Burn a Truck"	November 3, 2011
Jermaine LeBron of Osceola County, Florida lures Larry Neal Oliver into his house offering to sell Oliver custom hubcaps for his truck. LeBron shoots Oliver in the back of his head using his sawed-off shotgun at close range. LeBron steals Oliver's money and stereo equipment. LeBron tells the other house members to burn identification papers and clean up the blood and shotgun shells from the crime scene. They dispose of the body in a rural area near Walt Disney World. LeBron flees to New York City and hides out in his mother's topless bar called Legz Diamond. During his stay, investigators find several drops of dried blood and spent shotgun shells, which they trace to a shotgun used by LeBron. Officers issue an arrest warrant in New York City. While in the parking lot of the bar, LeBron is arrested, extradited back to Florida, and sentenced to death.
46	7	"Got to Pose as a Firefighter"	November 10, 2011
On October 31, 2005, Peter Braunstein goes to the apartment of his ex-girlfriend Jane Larkworthy in Chelsea, Manhattan. He sets two small fires in the lobby, changes into a fireman's uniform, and knocks on Larkworthy's door, telling her that the building is on fire. When Larkworthy opens the door, Braunstein chloroforms her and sexually assaults her several times over the course of the next 13 hours. On November 17, Braunstein is spotted by police at a coffee shop in Brooklyn and flees to Memphis, Tennessee, where he is turned in by students from a local university. Braunstein is extradited back to New York and convicted of sexual abuse, kidnapping, arson, burglary, and robbery. On June 18, 2007, Braunstein is sentenced to 18 years to life in prison.
47	8	"Got to Be a Car Salesman"	November 17, 2011
After spending most of his 38 years in prison for safe-cracking and drug charges, Brian McCollum decides to go straight and gets a job as a car salesman. He stays out of trouble for the next six years until one day he is caught driving while intoxicated. His parole is revoked, and a warrant is issued. McCollum continues working in auto sales while dodging law enforcement. When he is caught, numerous character witnesses testify on his behalf and he is sentenced to 8½ months in a low security prison for alcohol treatment. Afterwards, McCollum is released and resumes selling cars.
48	9	"Got to Steal a Rich Woman's Jewelry"	December 1, 2011
Geneva Kane fires her caregiver Nancy Dean for poor attendance and drinking on the job. Dean's daughter Kaysie Dudley and her boyfriend Michael Sorrentino make a trip to Kane's house, where they steal Kane's rings and Dudley kills Kane. The following day, Kane's body is discovered by a neighbor, and another neighbor reports an unusual car that was nearby, one that was later found to belong to Sorrentino. Dean orders Dudley and Sorrentino to go on the run. Sorrentino flees to California. He is apprehended there after being identified as the suspect. Dudley flees to Gainesville, Georgia, where she gets help hiding from various friends. Finally, one friend turns her in. Sorrentino receives a 25-year sentence for second-degree murder and serves eight years. Dean is convicted of second degree murder, but it is overturned, and she serves no time at all. Dudley receives the death penalty, later commuted to a life sentence.
49	10	"Got to Make a Dummy Out of Sheets"	December 8, 2011
Parolee and frequent prison escapee Chuck Mallos is apprehended while attempting to rob a pharmacy. Once back in prison, he escapes through the window of the prison gym and hops on board a freight train to Panama City, Florida, where he goes by the name "Franky Lee Bass." He is arrested for a string of robberies, but police fail to identify him as Mallos. While awaiting trial in the local jail, he escapes three more times. On the third escape, Mallos breaks into an apartment and takes the resident as a hostage, forcing the hostage to drive him to a nearby town. Mallos is apprehended at a bar after being reported as a suspicious person. He is currently serving multiple life sentences.
50	11	"Got to Escape From The Rock"	December 15, 2011
William Van Poyck is serving a life sentence at Florida State Prison for armed robbery when he is caught with a stash of homemade weapons and transferred to solitary confinement at the more secure Union Correctional Institution, also known as "The Rock". Van Poyck is later transferred into the mainstream prison population, where he and four other inmates form an escape plan. Of the five, only Van Poyck makes it out. He hops a train to St. Petersburg and drives a stolen car to West Palm Beach, where he moves in with a friend. When Van Poyck tries to obtain weapons for a robbery, his friend turns him in. Van Poyck returns to prison and is paroled eight years later. After dabbling in the drug trade and committing some armed robberies, Van Poyck attempts to help his friend escape from custody. During the breakout, Van Poyck's friend kills one of the guards and attempts to kill the other. Both men are captured and given the death penalty after a high speed chase.
51	12	"Got to Run to Mexico With My Kids"	December 22, 2011
Single mother of three Valerie Castellano and her girlfriend Becky Imus decide to rob a bank and flee to Mexico. Valerie holds up the bank while Becky waits with the kids in the car. Once they arrive in Mexico, they celebrate by playing on the beach and buying a variety of drugs. The next day, they argue over many different issues. Imus flies back to the United States and turns herself in, receiving a nine month sentence. While attempting to get her take in the robbery changed to Mexican currency, Castellano is robbed and flees to Mexico City, where she lands a job at a beauty salon. After losing the job, she is arrested for theft and severely injured while escaping from the police. Neighbors help take care of her and the kids during that time. Castellano is arrested and deported and her mother takes the children back home. Castellano receives eight years in prison.
52	13	"Got to Pretend I'm a Priest"	December 29, 2011
Fred Brito is a master conman. As a young man, he impersonates a senior Marine officer, lives off a series of rich lovers (of both sexes), and embezzles $1,000 from his job at a bank. After serving prison time for credit card fraud in both Canada and the United States, Brito cons his way into a series of top white collar positions, including lawyer, CEO, psychiatrist, executive director, and serving on the planning commission for the city of Lancaster, California. While in this position, he is exposed as a fraud and spends a year in prison for parole violations. Once free, Brito embezzles money from a law firm where he is posing as an attorney and flees to Mexico, where he cons his way into the priesthood. Brito serves as a priest in Mexico, Yuma, and Phoenix before being discovered and captured. He serves 18 months for the embezzlement from the law firm.
53	14	"Got to Escape Underground"	January 5, 2012
Drug addict Toby Young of DeKalb County, Tennessee has a history of stealing cars and taking them on joyrides. One day, he crashes a stolen pickup truck he is driving and sets it on fire. He runs into the woods before reaching another farm, where he escapes in a stolen minivan. Young's erratic driving draws attention of police, who stop him after a high speed chase, and Young is booked into the county jail. Two weeks into his stay, Young escapes with another inmate. Young calls a Mexican friend, who drives Young to Guanajuato, Mexico, where he lives in a drug storehouse. Young begins a romantic relationship with his friend's sister Maria and gets a job driving a truck for her family business. Young is frequently stopped by Federales for driving without a license, but always bribes his way out of it. When he is caught with marijuana in the car, the Federales arrest him and send him on a plane back to Tennessee the following day. Young is sentenced to three years in prison.

=== Season 5 ===
No. overall	No. in season	Title	Original release date
54	1	"Got to Hide Out in Suburbia"	April 11, 2012
55	2	"Got to Murder My Own Family"	April 18, 2012
Jamie Wiley of Thermopolis, Wyoming, a straight A student, murders his stepmother and his three brothers in cold blood, then sets the house on fire. He is ruled competent to stand trial and pleads guilty to all counts, and receives the maximum possible sentence, making him never eligible for parole. Four years later, Wiley and another inmate escape from prison and run six miles to the nearby town of Sinclair, where they steal a pickup truck. The truck runs out of gas, leaving them stranded in the wilderness. The other escapee is apprehended the following morning, but Wiley manages to elude authorities, and he finds a truck where he hides in the undercarriage. The truck takes him on a rough ride to Utah along a gravel road, where he is badly bruised by numerous stones. He reaches a rest area where he calls a friend for help. His friend turns him in and, with his father present, Wiley is apprehended.
56	3	"Got to Build a Bridge to Freedom"	April 25, 2012
Nicholas Johnson is sentenced to 90 years in prison for a string of armed robberies in the Portland, Oregon area. While in prison, he befriends another inmate and the pair begin plotting their escape using a set of stolen ladders to scale the fence. Once outside, they run several miles to the nearest town, where they steal a car and drive to Portland. They first hide out at Johnson's aunt's house, then at that of a friend. They rob drug dealers to obtain cash and drugs to sell, and drive to California, where they plan to get into the drug trade. After their first deal goes wrong, Johnson heads back to Portland and makes plans with a friend to rob a gun shop. Officers spot a stolen vehicle and the pair are captured. Johnson serves five more years in maximum security before the remainder of his sentence is overturned on appeal and he is released. He has stayed out of trouble with the law since.
57	4	"Got to Build a Meth Lab"	May 2, 2012
Truck driver Jerry Wayne Wright starts using meth to console himself after his wife leaves him for another man. This progresses to him becoming a meth dealer in Monroe County, Tennessee, the state's top county for meth. When Wright's trailer explodes and his investment is lost, he goes to an associate to claim money he feels he is owed. During the ensuing fight, Wright accidentally kills the man and flees to his sister's house in Ohio. His sister goes to the police and Wright flees back to Tennessee, where police surround the trailer park and apprehend him. After several months in jail, Wright escapes and a friend drives him back to Ohio. When he learns that police are pressuring his family, Wright decides to surrender.
58	5	"Got to Run With My Brother"	May 9, 2012
Brothers Mark and Maverick Maher have been career criminals for most of their lives. Their crimes include auto theft, burglary, and vandalism. While young, they are arrested and each spend about a year in prison. Following their release, they return to their hometown of Jupiter Farms, Florida and later flee to Des Moines, Iowa. Their brother-in-law turns them in and they spend several more years in prison before they are released and return to a life of crime.
59	6	"Got to Break Into Vacation Homes"	May 16, 2012
Career criminal William Alderman falls in love with single mother and bad check writer Christine Lefland and the two go on the run together. Their path takes them through Arkansas, where they steal a car and nearly kill a police officer; Washington, where they steal a gun; and Idaho, where they squat in vacant vacation homes. As Christmas nears, they return to their native Florida and drop in on Alderman's friend Alfred Davis, who boasts that he just received a $1,000 cash bonus from work. While Davis is asleep, Alderman takes the cash, which awakens Davis. Alderman and Lefland tie Davis down with neckties, stuff a sock into his mouth, then place duck tape around his mouth. The restraint kills Davis, leading to the pair being sought for homicide. They spend the loot on Christmas gifts for Lefland's daughter, Emily, before heading back to Idaho. On the way, Emily gets sick and they are forced to stop at a motel, where they are apprehended. Both receive life sentences. Emily is adopted by a loving family. Lefland commits suicide in prison.
60	7	"Got to Run to Costa Rica"	May 23, 2012
To support his drug habit, David Harden begins robbing beachfront condos in his native Florida. When caught, he skips bail and catches a plane to Costa Rica with his new girlfriend. They try and fail to run a bed and breakfast. Harden loses all his money, his girlfriend heads back home, and he starts selling drugs. An argument with his sales partner leads to his arrest and deportation. Once back in the United States, he moves in with his parents, steals his father's credit card, and is sentenced to 15 years in prison. About 1½ years into his sentence, he escapes, but is caught six days later when his girlfriend tips off police.
61	8	"Got to Prey On Tourists"	May 30, 2012
Patsy Jones and two of her friends begin carjacking tourists and robbing them of their cash. When one planned victim, a German tourist, resists, Jones shoots him to death. The murder draws international media attention and sightings of a yellow rental truck used in the robberies are reported in the news. Jones spends several days dodging police before being apprehended.
62	9	"Got to Make It in the Big Easy"	June 6, 2012
Jeremy Woods convinces his fiancé Dawn Wallace to write bad checks for thousands of dollars. When the law catches up with them, Woods murders Dawn and Dawn's infant son Jamie, hides the bodies, and reports them as missing. Woods forms a new relationship with a woman named Shannon and finances the relationship by writing over $100,000 in bad checks. Woods is arrested, but his father bails him out of jail after six weeks. Woods and Shannon go on the run to New Orleans, where Jeremy forms a sugar daddy relationship with an older man named Louis and is employed by his auto repair business. When Shannon disapproves, he plans to murder her and Louis, take Louis's money and car, and run. Shannon turns him in and he is extradited to Montana. Woods is sentenced to 15 years in prison for the check fraud. He is sent to boot camp where successful completion may earn him early release. But the experience also guides him to confess the murders, for which he receives two life sentences.
63	10	"Got to Become a Neo-Nazi"	June 13, 2012
John DiTullio leaves his abusive father and hitchhikes to Milwaukee, where he gets involved in a biker gang, and warrants are issued for his arrest. To dodge the warrants, DiTullio travels to Port Richey, Florida where he becomes involved with the Ku Klux Klan. He discovers a neighbor of the compound is in an interracial marriage and has a gay son. He stabs the woman and a boy who he mistakes for being the gay son. The woman survives; the boy dies. Many other members flee the compound, but he remains in hiding there. A SWAT team arrives, preparing for a gun fight, but he surrenders peacefully. He denies being the killer, but leaves behind incriminating notes, which are used to gain a conviction and life sentence.
64	11	"Got to Take Down My Ex-Boyfriend"	June 20, 2012
Part 1: Roy Betts breaks into a mobile home in Bradenton, Florida to steal three guns and then shoots a man in the arm. He steals a truck, drives along Interstate 4, and is arrested while stopping for a nap. Part 2: Drug dealer Donna Schatz goes on the run after committing several violent assaults while at a party. She supports herself by robbing houses.
65	12	"Got Hammered on a Sailboat"	June 27, 2012
Part 1: Howard Brown and his girlfriend are befriended by a fellow drug addict who lives on a boat. Brown murders the man with a hammer and steals anything on the boat he finds valuable. Brown and his girlfriend flee to St. Petersburg, New York City, and finally Fayetteville, North Carolina, where a friend has promised to help them flee the country to Mexico. While awaiting help from the friend, the pair use the stolen credit card to rent a hotel room, a mistake that leads to their capture. Part 2: Brandon Starks is in a juvenile jail, awaiting trial, when he stages an escape that he gets others involved in. With his mother's help, Starks escapes and spends several weeks on the run. Starks is cornered at the home of a cousin. Police are tipped off when his mother comes to visit and finds him there.
66	13	"Got to Make You a Superstar"	July 31, 2012
Part 1: Jonathan Roda poses as a record producer and convinces aspiring musicians to hand over their life savings. When Roda finds out he is wanted, he moves on to Nashville, where he attempts to con country star Mindy McCready. He takes her to Tucson International Airport, where, seeing a heightened police presence, Roda panics, thinking they are after him. Roda commandeers a limousine and leads police on a high speed chase before he is cornered. Part 2: Rising country singer Tim DeHerrera forms a romantic relationship with a young woman nicknamed "Peaches," a drug addict whose propensity for burglary and violence keeps the pair on the run. Investigators locate them through Peaches' MySpace page and both are sentenced to prison.

=== Season 6 ===
No. overall	No. in season	Title	Original release date
67	1	"Got to Kill My Step-Dad"	June 24, 2013
In Miami, Florida, teenage Randy Baggett is sentenced to 26 years to life in prison for killing his abusive stepfather. He escapes from the high security prison and treks through the woods as police dogs search for him. Baggett gets a job in a shopping mall until the sentencing judge from his case recognizes him. A few weeks later, he goes back to prison and escapes again with his friend, David Huffer. A few days later, Huffer and Baggett are both arrested at a local hotel. Baggett will be eligible for parole when he is 99.
68	2	"Got to Escape Through a Toilet"	July 1, 2013
In Putnam County, Florida, Timothy Wayne Fletcher is sentenced to 10 years in prison for robbery. He escapes with the help of another inmate, Doni Ray Brown. The two steal a pickup truck from a nearby repair shop and drive to the house of Fletcher's step-grandmother, Helen Key Googe's house, with the intent to rob her. The robbery goes wrong and Brown kills Googe by strangling her. Brown and Fletcher steal her car and valuables, and travel to Kentucky. Three days after their escape, the pair are caught by Kentucky state troopers. Brown receives a life sentence without parole while Timothy Fletcher receives the death penalty.
69	3	"Got to Pose as a War Vet"	July 8, 2013
Jerrod Durr writes a series of bad checks under his father's name. After a stint in juvenile prison, he works on improving his scam. Durr obtains a military uniform using his father's name, then courts women online and convinces them to buy things for him. After fraudulently purchasing two automobiles, he is arrested in a sting and spends five months in prison. Upon release, Durr moves on to another girlfriend and purchases a house and a Ford Mustang with more bad checks. The Mustang is entered into the police database as a stolen car, and police catch Durr's friend driving it. The friend leads police to Durr. As of the filming of this episode, he was serving his sentence in a fourth state for fraud.
70	4	"Got to Escape With One Leg"	July 15, 2013
In Florida, Walter Rhodes steals a purse from a woman and flees with police in pursuit. During the ensuing chase, Rhodes is hit by a bullet in his left leg. Police arrest Rhodes and take him to the hospital, where his leg is amputated. Once released from the hospital, he is sent to prison. After two failed attempts at escape, Rhodes is transferred to a maximum security prison where he remains until being paroled after 18 years. After release, he travels to New Mexico, where he marries and lives quietly for almost a decade before violating his parole. Rhodes is extradited back to Florida, where he will remain in prison for the rest of his life.
71	5	"Got to Be the Black Market Maestro"	July 22, 2013
Kylen Padgett is arrested as a minor for stabbing his rival in a knife fight. At trial, Padgett claims self-defense and is acquitted. Once free, Padgett and some friends commit a series of burglaries in an exclusive gated community. Padgett and his friends are caught in the act and nearly arrested, but make it onto their boat and get away. The following day, Heather Striden, one of Padgett's accomplices, is caught after using a stolen cell phone. Fearing a long prison sentence, Striden gives away the identities of all those involved. Padgett is arrested and released once, only to be caught again while riding in a friend's car when that car is stopped for a violation. The officer searches the vehicle, finds Padgett's ID, and Padgett is sent to prison for four years.
72	6	"Got to Rob a Pawn Shop"	July 29, 2013
Brothers Terry and Conan Helsley steal 17 guns and some cash from a pawn shop in Boonville, Indiana while Conan's girlfriend Brandi Lovell waits in the car. After successfully evading capture, Conan and Brandi break into a home and steal a gun. Conan and Brandi are arrested at the Helsley house and taken to Warrick County Jail. After spending a couple months in prison, Conan and inmate Kent Day escape and hide in a warehouse, squeezing inside a cabinet while police search the place. They steal a car and continue their escape until two teenage girls recognize them as wanted men and notify police. After a high speed chase, police search the car and take them into custody. Conan was later transferred to a high-security prison.
73	7	"Got to Be Bonnie and Clyde"	August 5, 2013
Robert Askew and his girlfriend Katrina commit a string of burglaries throughout Virginia and North Carolina. Each time he goes to prison, Askew escapes and resumes his criminal activity.
74	8	"Got to Be the Green Baron"	August 12, 2013
In Fort Lauderdale, Florida, Tony Darwin and his group of 18 friends make their living smuggling marijuana from Jamaica into the United States. All are members of the Ethiopian Zion Coptic Church, which uses marijuana as a sacrament. Darwin buys a mansion in Fort Lauderdale and finds a girlfriend, Elena. Darwin and his associate Carl Swanson board a plane full of marijuana bags and fly low through the Everglades to avoid detection by radar. The plane crashes into a radio tower and flips over, severing Swanson's head from his body. Darwin treks through the Everglades back to his mansion. Once there, he and Elena fly to Australia at 4:00 A.M. in order to evade authorities, who are rapidly closing in. Police arrest all the other Coptics except for Darwin. Elena goes back to the States and steals all of Darwin's money. When Darwin returns to the USA to visit Elena, he is arrested and sentenced to 18 years in prison.

=== Season 7 ===
No. overall	No. in season	Title	Original release date
75	1	"Got to Be a Ladies' Man"	June 2, 2014
76	2	"Got to Fall in Love with a Prison Guard"	June 9, 2014
In Joplin, Missouri, 19-year-old Terry Banks kills his 17-year-old girlfriend's husband with help from his friend Matt Meyers. Meyers gets 67 years in prison, while Banks is sentenced to life without the possibility of parole. While incarcerated at Crossroads Correctional Center, Banks falls in love with prison guard Lynette Williams, who helps him escape. The couple head for Banks' father's home, where Terry, his father Charlie, and Williams decide to leave for South America. They take a bus to Victoria, Texas for the first leg of their trip. When word of the two fugitives hits national television, police receive a tip leading them to Victoria. They follow Charlie home from work and surround the trailer where Banks and Williams are hiding out. Williams is sentenced to five years in prison, while Banks adds five years to his life sentence. Charlie spends a year in jail for aiding and abetting.
77	3	"Got a Rich Widow"	June 16, 2014
Tired of receiving bad treatment from his wealthy clients, country club tennis instructor Brian Maurice Fuller decides to start robbing them. On his first try, Fuller is arrested while driving across state lines with a car full of stolen artwork and serves time in federal prison. Upon release, Fuller and his coworker, Timothy Eric Walters, begin robbing wealthy older women of their expensive wedding rings. He is arrested when someone recognizes him after being featured on national television.
78	4	"Got to Be Part of the Texas Seven"	June 30, 2014
At John B. Connally Unit, a maximum-security prison near Kennedy, Texas, seven inmates craft and execute an elaborate plan for escape. Once free, the escapees hide out in a Dallas-Fort Worth area motel. Five days later, they rob an Oshman's Sporting Goods while dressed as security guards, taking the staff hostage and stealing more than 40 guns. When police arrive, the robbers open fire, shooting the officer 11 times and killing him. The group leave the scene and head to Colorado, where they buy an RV and head to a park, passing themselves off as a church group. A suspicious park ranger alerts law enforcement that he has spotted the "Texas Seven," as the group has come to be known. Six of the Seven are taken alive, but Larry James Harper shoots himself in the chest with a pistol inside the RV.
79	5	"Got to Pose As Katrina Refugee"	July 7, 2014
On October 19, 2005, Scott Webb kills his mother Margaret while in a drug-fueled rage. Scott and his wife Michelle, both hardened addicts, steal a truck from Scott's former work and go on the run. Upon reaching the Mississippi/Louisiana border, they are stopped at a checkpoint which has been set up in the wake of Hurricane Katrina. Scott places a sign in the window saying "relief truck" and they are allowed to continue onward. Meanwhile, the murder has been discovered and Scott is the top suspect. Scott and Michelle head across the country, posing as Katrina refugees and playing on people's sympathies in order to obtain prescription drugs and bus tickets. On November 21, 2005, the Webbs are arrested in Seattle, Washington. Scott was convicted of a second degree murder and sentenced to 15–18 years behind bars while Michelle received four years as an accessory.
80	6	"Got to Escape Through an Air Duct"	July 14, 2014
Rondell Reed is released from prison in 2010 after serving 21 years there. Reed moves to Kentucky and finds work in an auto repair shop. On April 16, 2011, Reed's boss pulls a gun on him during an argument. Reed grabs the gun and shoots his boss twice in the chest, then steals the dead man's car and heads for Indiana, where he has family. While evading police, Reed crashes the car and spends the next four months recovering from his injuries. While at the hospital, he confesses to the murder, is extradited to Florida, and spends the rest of his recovery time in prison. On October 24, 2011, Reed and another inmate escape by squeezing through an air duct. Reed passes through Georgia, Tennessee, and Ohio in a series of stolen cars. After a high speed chase, Reed's car crashes and he is returned to Florida to face two life sentences for second-degree murder, vehicle theft, and burglary.
81	7	"Got to Watch Those Country Girls"	July 21, 2014
In February 2003, brothers Roger and David DeLucenay are both incarcerated in Elkhart County Jail. They work together to escape and drive six hours to Bowling Green, Kentucky, where they work to raise money to travel and visit their children. When police catch up with them, the DeLucenay brothers spend several days dodging law enforcement before being recaptured. David is sentenced to eight years for his escape and Roger gets 68 years. He will be eligible for parole in 2038.
82	8	"Got to Be MacGuyver"	July 28, 2014
Harold Laird and two of his friends murder Laird's stepfather Red and Red's girlfriend. They plan to go to Pennsylvania, but are arrested when police find them driving a stolen truck. Laird is sentenced to 35 years to life. Laird escapes from prison and walks a few miles before stealing a pickup truck from a barn. When the truck breaks down, Laird sets out on foot again and is picked up by a police officer. He tells the officer he is driving to New Orleans to see his newborn baby. After being dropped off, Laird steals another pickup truck, but is so tired that he falls asleep in a parking lot. The police find him there and call for backup once they discover the truck has been stolen. Laird is extradited back to Texas and 20 years are added to his sentence.

=== Season 8 ===
No. overall	No. in season	Title	Original release date
83	1	"Got to Pretend to Be a Cop"	May 13, 2016
Peter Gibbs of Nashua, New Hampshire started smoking cocaine when he was nine years old. His life of crime includes armed robbery, assault and battery, selling drugs, stabbing a rival drug dealer, auto theft, and a home invasion robbery.
84	2	"Got a Handsome Face"	May 20, 2016
Steven Ray Milam and his friends commit a string of bank robberies in and around Dallas, Texas. Milam is arrested and sentenced to 24 months in prison. Upon release, Milam returns to bank robbery, this time wearing a full head mask, which leads law enforcement to dub him "The Handsome Guy Bandit." When a police officer recognizes Milam, he shoots the officer, runs three miles back home, says goodbye to his girlfriend Lisa, and goes on the run. While driving through Jackson, Mississippi, he is pulled over for tailgating and a high speed chase ensues. Milan is arrested and extradited back to Texas, where he gets 35 years in Styles Unit Prison near Beaumont, Texas for 11 robberies plus 28 years for attempted murder of a police officer.
85	3	"Got to Taunt the Cops"	May 27, 2016
Jimmy Maxwell has spent much of his life in prison for theft, assault, drug possession, and firearms charges. Maxwell is paroled in 2009 and moves in with his wife Cindy, whom he married while in prison. He goes on the run after threatening a friend with a knife during a drunken argument. When police catch up with him, Maxwell tries to goad the police into shooting him, but they hold their fire and apprehend him, sentencing him to 12 years in prison. Three years before his scheduled release, Maxwell escapes from prison and hires a courier to take him out of state. Police trail the truck and the courier pulls over. Maxwell hopes the police will shoot him, and they do, but with beanbag rounds instead of slugs and he is apprehended again. While at Dick Conner Correctional Center in Hominy, Oklahoma, he becomes a member of Gone to the Dogs Rescue Program and publishes the book American Outlaw: Price of Pride detailing his time on the run.
86	4	"Got to Send a Bomb in the Mail"	June 3, 2016
In 1979, while working in the prison furniture shop, convicted murderer Albert Paul makes a bomb made out of flammable fluid extracted from light bulbs. Paul sends the box to the home of attorney Robert A. Marden, who prosecuted one of his cases. When the former prosecutor opens the box, the fluid flashes, but fails to ignite. Marden calls the police and Paul is sent to a maximum security federal prison in Lewisburg, Pennsylvania with 20 years added to his life sentence. Paul escapes by hiding inside a box loaded onto a truck. He steals a car and drives to Minnesota to meet his prison pen pal Stella Day. Paul robs a bank and asks Stella to flee with him to Montreal, but Stella declines. Paul is caught when he stops in Rhinebeck, New York to look for a place to sleep. He is sent back to Maine State Prison and remains there at the time of broadcast.
87	5	"Got to Escape With a Battleaxe"	June 10, 2016
Russell Kerr of Fort Worth, Texas is arrested and sentenced to 60 years in maximum security for an aggravated robbery he claims not to have committed. While in prison, he and another inmate, Christopher Stout, escape using a homemade battleaxe. Stout and Kerr hide in an abandoned warehouse and spend the next few days dodging law enforcement. On New Year's Eve, Kerr stops by a bar hoping to enlist someone to drive him to town. As they prepare to leave, police block them in, arrest Kerr and send him back to prison.
88	6	"Got to Get Home to Mother"	June 17, 2016
Robert Nielsen escapes from a Florida prison, where he has been serving a 25 year sentence for an armed robbery he committed when he was 16. Nielsen catches a bus back to his home state of California, where his mother gives him an alias: "Lonny Patterson," a name she picked out of a magazine. Nielsen's father turns him in by taking him for a ride and leaving him alone while he calls the sheriff's office. Nielsen and his girlfriend Sharon agree he will skip his court date. One day, Sharon and Nielsen go for a motorcycle ride, during which they are hit when Nielsen drives on the wrong side of the road at 82 miles per hour. The driver of the car calls an ambulance and Nielsen is taken to a hospital, where the sheriffs find him. Once he recovers, Nielsen is extradited back to Florida with 15 years added to his sentence for the escape.
89	7	"Got to Get Out of Debt"	June 24, 2016
In South Los Angeles, truck driver Jaime Jones slips and falls at work, suffering a herniated disc in his lower back, forcing him to quit. Facing foreclosure on his home, Jones turns to bank robbery to pay his bills and becomes known as the "Neck Brace Bandit." Jones robs a total of six banks, while his girlfriend Kelcia remains unaware of his crimes until he is caught. Jones is originally sentenced to 15 years, but since his robberies were committed without the use of a firearm, his sentence is reduced to five years. While Jones serves his time, Kelcia and her children lose their home and are forced to go to a homeless shelter. Kelcia gets a job and an apartment. After Jones completes his five-year sentence, he reunites with his family, goes back to driving a truck, and promises never to rob another bank.
90	8	"Got to Crawl My Way to Freedom"	July 1, 2016
In March 2007, Darryl Norris is paroled after serving eight years of his 15-year sentence for two counts of armed robbery. On April 15, 2008, Norris and an accomplice named Robert rob a J&A store, where Robert shoots and kills a store clerk. Both men are arrested and Norris is sent to Waller County Jail to await trial for murder. Norris escapes from the jail and unsuccessfully attempts to contact his friend Jamal. Norris finds out the police are on his trail and sneaks onto a logging truck bound for Houston, Texas. In Houston, Norris rents a motel room and makes contact with Jamal just before the police arrive. At trial, Norris is sentenced to 45 years to life in prison and Robert is sentenced to 75 years.
91	9	"Got to Be Part of the Pittsburgh Six"	July 8, 2016
Andrew Thomas Heim of Pittsburgh is serving 4–10 years in prison for battery and assault. In prison, he recruits five other inmates to form a plan of escape. Leslie Kevin Billingsley digs out through the basement and the "Pittsburgh Six," as they become known, crawl their way to freedom. They steal a car and drive to Dayton, Ohio, where they steal a van, rob a grocery store. and head to a motel in Illinois, then proceed to St. Louis, Missouri, where they take methamphetamine. Thomas Berkelbaugh collapses in the bus terminal and is admitted to a hospital in Houston, where he is captured. Two more of the Six, Carmen Keller and Nuno Pontes, are captured after being pulled over for not wearing seat belts. Pontes escapes, but Keller informs law enforcement of where the group is hiding, forcing the remaining members to flee to a motel. Heim and Billingsley are caught in the hallway of the hotel while getting sodas from a vending machine, while George Conard and Pontes are arrested in the room. All are extradited back to western Pennsylvania.
92	10	"Got to Hit Homes on Halloween"	July 15, 2016
In El Paso, Texas, Michael Kidd and his two friends Kevin Crandall and Marcus Thompson decide to fund their drug habits by robbing homes. On Halloween night, 2011, they burglarize two homes successfully, but when they enter the third home, they are confronted by homeowners Dennis and Karen Collins. Kidd holds the Collinses hostage while Crandall and Thompson steal $1,500 in cash. Kidd and Thompson force Dennis to drive around town to take money from ATMs while Crandall stays behind to ensure Karen doesn't call the police. They return to the Collins home and find police present. Police arrest Thompson and Crandall, while Kidd avoids capture by hiding under some farm equipment. The following morning, Kidd calls his friend Joe to get a ride out of town. An officer follows them as they leave. The officer arrests Kidd when they stop for pedestrians. Eleven months later, Kidd and Thompson are sentenced to 15 years, while Crandall gets 20 years.
