= Christopher Daniel Gay =

American escapee

- Born: 1974 or 1975; Coffee County, Tennessee, U.S.
- Other name: Little Houdini
- Occupation: Car thief
- Known for: Stealing the tour bus of country music singer Crystal Gayle

Christopher Daniel Gay (born 1974 or 1975), also nicknamed Little Houdini, is an American habitual car thief and repeat escapee from custody. He gained notoriety in 2007 after stealing the tour bus of country music singer Crystal Gayle after an escape. After his last escape, Gay was captured in 2009.

== 2007 escape ==
In 2007, Gay escaped to visit his dying mother in Tennessee and while on the run from police he managed to steal the tour bus of country music singer Crystal Gayle (of whom Gay's mother happened to be a fan) and traveled to Daytona International Speedway (where he tried to pass himself off as a member of Tony Stewart's race team). He was apprehended by police after asking for directions from a prostitute who turned out to be part of a police sting (the bus was returned to Crystal Gayle undamaged). Twelve days following Gay's capture, Gay's mother died on February 7, 2007, of cancer. Gay was not allowed to attend her funeral.

This escape inspired country music singer-songwriter Tim O'Brien to write a song about his escape called "The Ballad of Christopher Daniel Gay". It also inspired rapper Sage Francis to write the song called "Little Houdini" on his 2010 album Li(f)e.

== Last escape ==
Gay escaped police custody the afternoon of March 3, 2009, while being transported from Orlando, Florida to Coffee County, Tennessee. He had been arrested and held for larceny of a Wal-Mart truck. When the officers stopped for food at a Waffle House in Kennesaw, Georgia, Gay was able to free himself of his restraints and fled from the car. Gay ran onto the campus of Kennesaw State University, where school officials and campus police locked down the university for approximately two hours.

Gay had previously escaped police custody in South Carolina while being transported to Alabama on charges of stealing an RV.

== In popular culture ==
- Gay's story is the subject of the song "Little Houdini" by rapper Sage Francis. The song includes details of his multiple escapes and tries to humanize his motives. It also mentions how, after visiting his dying father, he turned himself in.
- The story of his 2007 escape to visit his dying mother and his theft of Crystal Gayle's tour bus was featured on World's Dumbest Criminals. Gay's theft of the tour bus and his trip to a Daytona Beach speedway (where he attempted to pass himself off as Tony Stewart's bus driver) were mocked by the show's celebrity commentators. The clip was number one of the episode and given the title 2007: A Dumb Odyssey.
- The case of Gay's 2007 escape was featured on Investigation Discovery's I (Almost) Got Away with It, in an episode titled "Got a Country Legend's Tour Bus". It featured interviews and commentary from those involved with the case, the police, prison officials, Gay's sister, Gay himself, and Crystal Gayle.
- The radio program Radiolab produced a 2012 episode describing Gay's family history.
- Tampa Bay Times published a featured article about Gay.
