= If I Don't Stay the Night =

Studio album by Mindy McCready
- Released: November 4, 1997
- Recorded: 1997
- Studio: Starstruck Studios; Malloy Boys Studios; (Nashville, Tennessee); Mars Studios (Santa Monica, California)
- Genre: Country
- Length: 41:16
- Label: BNA Records
- Producer: David Malloy

Mindy McCready chronology
Ten Thousand Angels (1996)	If I Don't Stay the Night (1997)	I'm Not So Tough (1999)

Singles from If I Don't Stay the Night
- 1. "What If I Do" Released: October 3, 1997; 2. "You'll Never Know" Released: January 5, 1998; 3. "The Other Side of This Kiss" Released: May 22, 1998; 4. "Oh Romeo" Released: July 1998 (UK only)

Professional ratings
Review scores
Source	Rating
AllMusic	4/5 stars
Chicago Tribune	2.5/4 stars
Entertainment Weekly	B+
Los Angeles Times	2.5/4 stars

If I Don't Stay the Night is the second studio album by American country music artist Mindy McCready, released on November 4, 1997, under BNA Records. Following the commercial success of her debut studio album Ten Thousand Angels (1996), McCready returned work with producer David Malloy for this album.

Commercially, the album was a success, debuting at number 12 on the US Top Country Albums chart and becoming certified Gold by the RIAA, despite not spawning a top-ten single at country radio. Four official singles were released in total, including the UK-exclusive "Oh Romeo"; the highest-charting of the three officially released to country radio was "You'll Never Know" which hit number 19 on the US Hot Country Songs chart. The album has sold over 825,000 copies in total. This is McCready's last album to spawn a top-forty country radio hit.

== Track listing ==
If I Don't Stay the Night track listing
No.	Title	Writer(s)	Length
1.	"What If I Do"	Ed Hill; David Malloy; Mark D. Sanders	3:13
2.	"This Is Me"	Malloy; Sunny Russ; Tim Johnson	3:04
3.	"If I Don't Stay the Night"	Russ	3:33
4.	"Cross Against the Moon"	Kris Bergsnes; Brian Dean Maher	4:29
5.	"For a Good Time Call"	Mindy McCready; Johnson; Malloy	3:12
6.	"Oh Romeo"	Matraca Berg; Gary Harrison	4:15
7.	"The Other Side of This Kiss"	Bob DiPiero; Malloy; Sanders	3:04
8.	"You'll Never Know"	Angelo; Kim Richey	4:00
9.	"Fine Art of Holding a Woman"	Leslie Satcher; Kevin "Swine" Grantt	3:58
10.	"Only a Whisper"	Tommy Rocco; Charlie Black; Bobby Fischer	3:54
11.	"Long, Long Time"	Gary White	4:29
Total length:			41:16

International edition
No.	Title	Writer(s)	Length
12.	"Oh Romeo" (UK Remix)	Berg; Harrison	3:28
Total length:			44:44

== Personnel ==
From liner notes.

Musicians

- Bob Bellamy – hammer dulcimer
- Richard "Spady" Brannan – bass guitar
- Kathy Burdick – background vocals
- Larry Byrom – acoustic guitar
- Paul Franklin – pedal steel guitar
- Rob Hajacos – fiddle
- Dann Huff – electric guitar
- Jeff King – electric guitar
- Michael Landau – electric guitar
- Paul Leim – drums, percussion
- B. James Lowry – acoustic guitar
- David Malloy – background vocals
- Larry Marrs – background vocals
- Brent Mason – electric guitar
- Mindy McCready – lead vocals
- Jimmy Nichols – keyboards, background vocals, string arrangements on tracks 7, 9, and 11

Additional background vocals on "Oh Romeo": Cynthia French, Randi Michaels, Kim Parent, Melissa Ashworth

Technical

- Derek Bason – recording
- Kevin Beamish – recording, mixing
- David Malloy – production
- Denny Purcell – mastering

== Charts ==
=== Weekly charts ===
Chart (1997)	Peak position
Canadian Country Albums (RPM)	12
US Billboard 200	83
US Top Country Albums (Billboard)	12
UK Country Albums (OCC)	5

=== Year-end charts ===
Chart (1998)	Position
US Top Country Albums (Billboard)	43
