= Ten Thousand Angels =

Studio album by Mindy McCready
- Released: April 30, 1996
- Recorded: 1995
- Studios: Javelina Recording Studios; Malloy Boys Studios; Sound Stage Studios (Nashville, TN)
- Genre: Country
- Length: 35:20
- Label: BNA
- Producer: David Malloy

Mindy McCready chronology
| Ten Thousand Angels (1996) | If I Don't Stay the Night (1997) |

Singles from Ten Thousand Angels
- 1. "Ten Thousand Angels" Released: February 3, 1996; 2. "Guys Do It All the Time" Released: June 24, 1996; 3. "Maybe He'll Notice Her Now" Released: October 12, 1996; 4. "A Girl's Gotta Do (What a Girl's Gotta Do)" Released: February 24, 1997

Professional ratings
Review scores
| Source | Rating |
|---|---|
| AllMusic | 4/5 stars |
| Entertainment Weekly | B |
| Q | 3/5 stars |

Ten Thousand Angels is the debut studio album by American country music artist Mindy McCready, released on April 30, 1996, by BNA Records. The album peaked at No. 5 on the US Billboard Top Country Albums chart, and produced four singles on the Billboard Hot Country Songs chart. The first single, which was the title track, reached No. 6, and was followed by McCready's only No. 1 hit, "Guys Do It All the Time". Following this single was "Maybe He'll Notice Her Now", featuring backing vocals from Richie McDonald, the lead singer of the band Lonestar. This peaked at No. 18. "A Girl's Gotta Do (What a Girl's Gotta Do)" was the final single, reaching No. 4 in 1997.

== Track listing ==
| No. | Title | Writer(s) | Length |
|---|---|---|---|
| 1. | "Ten Thousand Angels" | Steven Dale Jones; Billy Henderson | 3:25 |
| 2. | "Guys Do It All the Time" | Bobby Whiteside; Kim Tribble | 3:11 |
| 3. | "All That I Am" | Kye Fleming; Mary Ann Kennedy; Deborah Allen | 3:23 |
| 4. | "Maybe He'll Notice Her Now" (duet with Richie McDonald) | Tim Johnson | 3:59 |
| 5. | "A Girl's Gotta Do (What a Girl's Gotta Do)" | Rick Bowles; Robert Byrne | 2:40 |
| 6. | "Have a Nice Day" | Lynn Chater; Kerry Chater | 4:56 |
| 7. | "It Ain't a Party" | Johnson; David Malloy; Kim Williams | 3:04 |
| 8. | "Without Love" | Johnson; Skip Ewing | 4:13 |
| 9. | "Tell Me Something I Don't Know" | Johnson; Malloy | 3:10 |
| 10. | "Breakin' It" | Mark Germino | 3:19 |
| Total length: | | | 35:20 |

== Personnel ==
- Mindy McCready – lead vocals
- Richard "Spady" Brannan – bass guitar
- Kathy Burdick – backing vocals
- Larry Byrom – acoustic guitar
- Paul Franklin – steel guitar
- Sonny Garrish – steel guitar
- Rob Hajacos – fiddle
- Tom Hemby – acoustic guitar
- John Hobbs – piano
- Dann Huff – electric guitar
- Mary Ann Kennedy – mandolin, backing vocals
- Paul Leim – drums
- Terry McMillan – harmonica
- Jimmy Nichols – piano, keyboards, synthesizer strings, backing vocals
- Don Potter – acoustic guitar
- Norro Wilson – backing vocals
- Richie McDonald – backing vocals (track 4)
- Strings performed by the Nashville String Machine; Carl Gorodetzky, concert master. String arrangements by Ronn Huff

== Production ==
- Produced by David Malloy
- Engineers: Kevin Beamish, Tonya Ginnetti, David Malloy, Jimmy Nichols, Warren Peterson, J. Gary Smith
- Assistant engineers: Mark Beronulli, Mark Hagen, Joe Hayden, Mel Jones, King Williams
- Mixing: Kevin Beamish
- Digital editing: Carlos Grier
- Mastering: Denny Purcell, Jonathan Russell

== Charts ==
=== Weekly charts ===
| Chart (1996) | Peak position |
|---|---|
| Canada Top Albums/CDs (RPM) | 93 |
| Canadian Country Albums (RPM) | 1 |
| US Billboard 200 | 40 |
| US Top Country Albums (Billboard) | 5 |
| US Heatseekers Albums (Billboard) | 1 |

=== Year-end charts ===
| Chart (1996) | Position |
|---|---|
| Canadian Country Albums (RPM) | 17 |
| US Billboard 200 | 137 |
| US Top Country Albums (Billboard) | 20 |
| Chart (1997) | Position |
| Canadian Country Albums (RPM) | 33 |
| US Billboard 200 | 144 |
| US Top Country Albums (Billboard) | 16 |
