= A Girl's Gotta Do (What a Girl's Gotta Do) =

Single by Mindy McCready

from the album Ten Thousand Angels
- B-side: "Maybe He'll Notice Her Now"
- Released: February 24, 1997
- Recorded: 1995
- Genre: Country pop
- Length: 2:43
- Label: BNA
- Songwriters: Robert Byrne; Rick Bowles
- Producers: David Malloy; Norro Wilson

Mindy McCready singles chronology
"Maybe He'll Notice Her Now" (1996)	"A Girl's Gotta Do (What a Girl's Gotta Do)" (1997)	"What If I Do" (1997)

Alternative cover
- Promotional cover

"A Girl's Gotta Do (What a Girl's Gotta Do)" is a song by American country music recording artist Mindy McCready. The track, written by Robert Byrne and Rick Bowles and produced by David Malloy and Norro Wilson, was released on February 24, 1997, as the fourth and final single from McCready's debut studio album Ten Thousand Angels (1996). Unlike the previous singles from the album, "A Girl's Gotta Do" did not have a music video.

A commercial success, "A Girl's Gotta Do" peaked at number four on both the Canadian RPM Country Tracks and US Billboard Hot Country Songs charts, becoming her last top-ten hits on both. McCready performed the song at the 32nd ACM Awards in 1997 as part of a "Top New Female Vocalist Medley" alongside nominees Deana Carter and LeAnn Rimes, who performed their hit songs "We Danced Anyway" and "Blue". She performed a shortened version of the single at the Stars of Tomorrow special.

== Content ==
"A Girl's Gotta Do" is performed in the key of B major (with a key change to C# major, with a metronome of 112. It is about a woman being independent following leaving her partner.

== Critical reception ==
The country music website The Boot noted it as a highlight among McCready's songs.

== Charts ==
"A Girl's Gotta Do" debuted at number 59 on the US Billboard Hot Country Songs chart the week of March 1, 1997, becoming McCready's third and final top-ten single.

=== Weekly charts ===
Chart (1997)	Peak position
Canada Country Singles (RPM)	4
US Bubbling Under Hot 100 (Billboard)	5
US Hot Country Songs (Billboard)	4

=== Year-end charts ===
Chart (1997)	Position
Canada Country Tracks (RPM)	83
US Country Songs (Billboard)	41
US Country (Radio & Records)	47
