= Guys Do It All the Time =

Single by Mindy McCready

from the album Ten Thousand Angels
- B-side: "Guys Do It All the Time" (Dance Mix)
- Released: June 24, 1996
- Recorded: 1995
- Genre: Neotraditional country
- Length: 3:11 (album version); 4:18 (Dance Mix)
- Label: BNA
- Songwriters: Bobby Whiteside; Kim Tribble
- Producer: David Malloy

Mindy McCready singles chronology
"Ten Thousand Angels" (1996)	"Guys Do It All the Time" (1996)	"Maybe He'll Notice Her Now" (1996)

"Guys Do It All the Time" is a song by American country music artist Mindy McCready, released as the second single from her debut studio album Ten Thousand Angels (1996) on June 24, 1996 via BNA Records. The track was written by Bobby Whiteside and Kim Tribble.

The track was a huge hit and became McCready's only number one single, hitting the top of the US Billboard Hot Country Songs chart the week of September 14, 1996. The track also became her only chart entry on the Billboard Hot 100, hitting number 72. It was later re-recorded on her fifth and final studio album I'm Still Here (2010) along with "Ten Thousand Angels".

== Content ==
Regarded as a feminist anthem, "Guys Do It All the Time" is a song about the female narrator doing things that guys normally do, like getting home late and using money to wash her truck instead of mowing the front yard, and using it against them, explaining how women should need actual reasons, not excuses. It is performed in the key of C major with a metronome of 84.

== Critical reception ==
Deborah Evans Price of Billboard magazine reviewed the song favorably, saying that its "infectious, uptempo groove and clever lyric should ensure repeated play." She goes on to call McCready's voice "likeable" and says that she "delivers this song about turning the tables on men with sassy style." Kevin John Coyne of Country Universe said "its role reversal storyline is coated with just enough sugar from McCready’s twangy performance to make its cutting gender commentary go down smoothly."

== Chart performance ==
"Guys Do It All the Time" debuted at number 71 on the US Billboard Hot Country Songs chart the week of June 8, 1996, due to unsolicited play as an album track. It quickly rose up the chart and rose to the top on September 14, displacing Rick Trevino's "Learning as You Go". It spent one week before getting displaced by Bryan White's "So Much for Pretending". It spent 20 weeks in total on the chart. The track also charted on the Billboard Hot 100, reaching number 72 on September 21, 1996, and spending 9 weeks in total.

== Track listings and formats ==
US jukebox, CD, and cassette single

1. "Guys Do It All the Time" – 3:11
2. "Guys Do It All the Time" (Dance Mix) – 4:18

German CD single

1. "Guys Do It All the Time" – 3:11
2. "Maybe He'll Notice Her Now" – 3:59
3. "Without Love" – 4:13

== Charts ==
=== Weekly charts ===
Weekly chart performance for "Guys Do It All the Time"
Chart (1996)	Peak position
Canada Country Singles (RPM)	1
US Billboard Hot 100	72
US Hot Country Songs (Billboard)	1
US Country Top 50 (Radio & Records)	2

=== Year-end charts ===
1996 year-end chart performance for "Guys Do It All the Time"
Chart (1996)	Position
Canada Country Tracks (RPM)	32
US Country Songs (Billboard)	30
US Country (Radio & Records)	58

== Parodies ==
- American country music parody artist Cledus T. Judd released a parody of "Guys Do It All The Time" titled "Wives Do It All The Time" on his 1998 album Did I Shave My Back For This?.
