= Richie McDonald =

American singer-songwriter (born 1962)

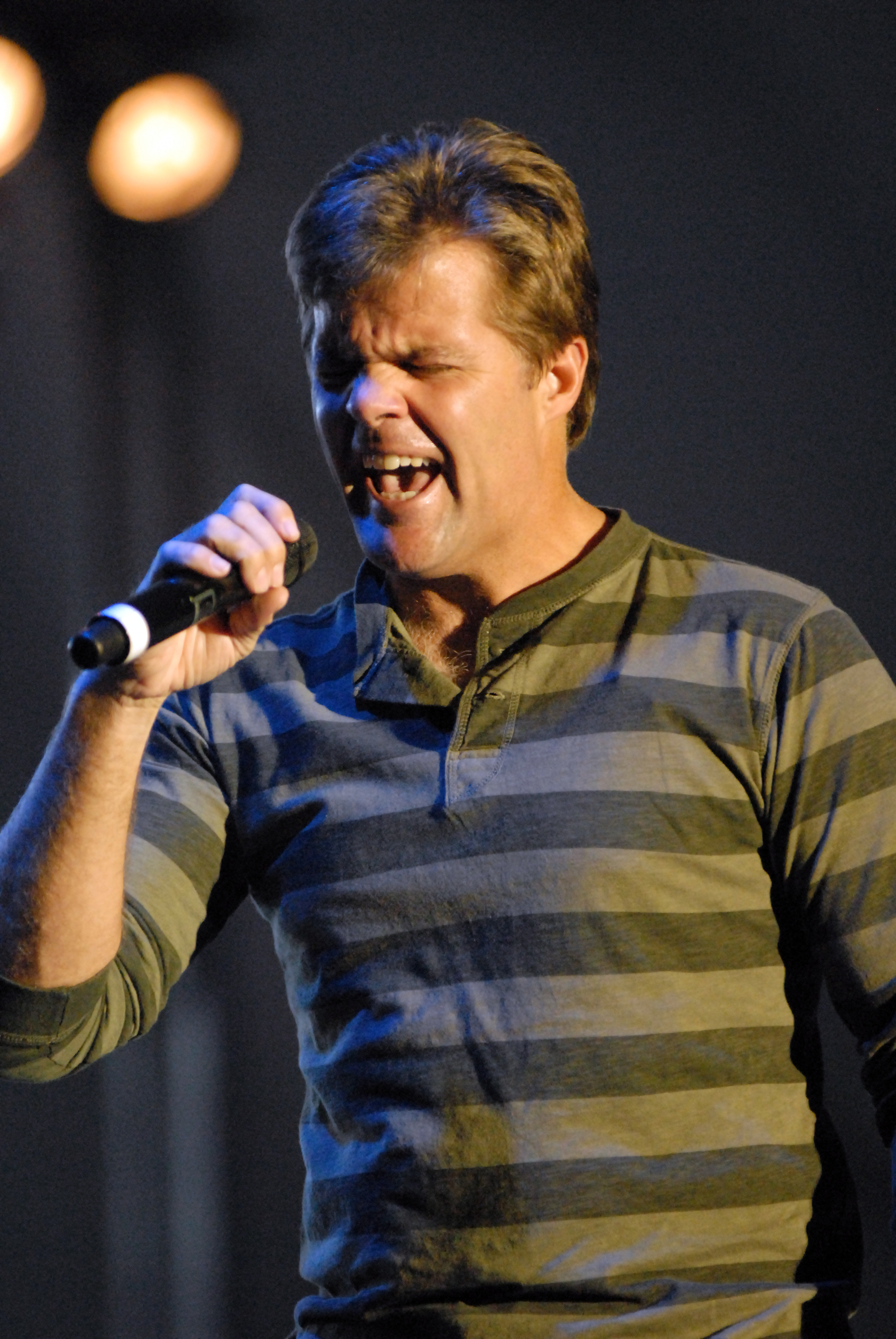
- McDonald in 2007

Background information
- Born: Richard Vance McDonald; February 6, 1962 (age 64)
- Origin: Lubbock, Texas, U.S.
- Genres: Country; Christian
- Occupations: Singer; songwriter
- Instruments: Vocals; acoustic guitar; piano
- Years active: 1981–present
- Labels: BNA; 4 Star; Loremoma; Stroudavarious
- Member of: The Frontmen
- Formerly of: Lonestar
- Website: richiemcdonald.com

Richard Vance McDonald (born February 6, 1962) is an American country music singer and songwriter. From 1994 until his departure in 2007, he was the lead singer of the group Lonestar, which recorded seven studio albums on BNA Records during his tenure as lead vocalist. For the first seven years of the band's existence, he alternated with then-bassist John Rich as vocalist. McDonald became the sole lead vocalist of Lonestar following Rich's departure. McDonald co-wrote several of the band's singles, and sang lead on all but one of them; he would rejoin the band in 2011 before exiting again in 2021 to perform with The Frontmen. Outside Lonestar, he has charted twice as a guest vocalist on others' songs, in addition to releasing two independent albums and four solo singles.

== Biography ==
Richie McDonald was born on February 6, 1962, in Lubbock, Texas He was asked to join the band Lonestar by founding member Dean Sams in 1992. He served as the band's lead vocalist, with other members comprising bass guitarist John Rich (who left in 1998 and was never officially replaced), drummer Keech Rainwater, keyboardist, guitarist, vocals and founding member Dean Sams and guitarist, vocals Michael Britt. Lonestar signed to BNA Records in 1995, and with McDonald as lead vocalist, they released seven studio albums, a Christmas album, and a greatest hits package, and 27 chart singles.

McDonald announced his departure from Lonestar in 2007, with Cody Collins succeeding him as the group's lead vocalist. On November 8, 2007, McDonald released an album of Christmas music, titled If Every Day Could Be Christmas. One of the songs on this album, "Coming Home for Christmas" (a collaboration with Jim Brickman) reached No. 4 on the Hot Adult Contemporary Tracks charts at the end of the year.

McDonald released his solo debut album I Turn to You on June 3, 2008. He signed a deal with Stroudavarious Records a month later. His first single for the label, "How Do I Just Stop", was released in November, but did not chart until the week of January 17, 2009, where it debuted at number 53 on the Hot Country Songs chart and peaked at 51. A second single, "Hey God", which was originally on his I Turn to You album and before that on Lonestar's 2006 album Mountains, was released on March 3, 2009, but was withdrawn from country radio and replaced with "Six Foot Teddy Bear."

McDonald released Slowdown, his second solo album, in 2010. This album included "How Do I Just Stop", which also peaked at number 51. In 2011, he reunited with Lonestar after Collins left. Following his reunion with Lonestar, they recorded two additional albums, Life as We Know It and Never Enders, released in 2013 and 2016, respectively.

In March 2021, McDonald announced that he would again be leaving Lonestar to pursue a career as a member of The Frontmen of Country, which also consists of Tim Rushlow and Larry Stewart, the former lead singers of Little Texas and Restless Heart, respectively. McDonald was succeeded by Drew Womack, lead singer of Sons of the Desert, as Lonestar's new lead vocalist.

== Outside contributions ==
McDonald has sung duet or backing vocals on several artists' albums, including "Maybe He'll Notice Her Now", a single from Mindy McCready's 1996 debut Ten Thousand Angels (a song which peaked at No. 18 on the Hot Country Songs charts in early 1997), "Outside Looking In" on Kellie Coffey's 2002 debut When You Lie Next to Me, and "Havin' a Good Time" on Tommy Shane Steiner's 2002 debut Then Came the Night.

He has also co-written singles for other country music artists, including "She's Always Right" by Clay Walker, "Jimmy's Got a Girlfriend" by The Wilkinsons, "Let Them Be Little" by Billy Dean (which Lonestar itself also recorded), "Coalmine" by Sara Evans, and "Once a Woman Gets a Hold of Your Heart" by Heartland.

== Personal life ==
McDonald lives near Murfreesboro, Tennessee, with his wife, Lorie, and their three children.

== Discography ==
=== Studio albums ===
Title	Album details	Peak chart positions			
Title	Album details	US Christian	US Country	US	US Indie
I Turn to You	Release date: June 3, 2008; Label: Stroudavarious Records	6	19	126	18
Slow Down	Release date: December 1, 2010; Label: Loremoma Music	—	—	—	—
"—" denotes releases that did not chart

=== Christmas albums ===
Title	Album details
If Every Day Could Be Christmas	Release date: November 6, 2007; Label: Loremoma Music

=== Singles ===
Year	Single	Peak positions	Album
Year	Single	US Country	Album
2007	"God's Still in America"	—	We Are Enterprise: The Album to Benefit; Rebuilding of Enterprise High School
2008	"I Turn to You"	—	I Turn to You
2009	"How Do I Just Stop"	51	Slow Down
2009	"Six Foot Teddy Bear"	51	Non-album song
2011	"Footprints on the Moon"	—	Slow Down
"—" denotes releases that did not chart

=== Guest singles ===
Year	Single	Artist	Peak chart positions				Album
Year	Single	Artist	US Country	US Bubbling	US AC	CAN Country	Album
1997	"Maybe He'll Notice Her Now"	Mindy McCready	18	2	—	11	Ten Thousand Angels
2007	"Coming Home for Christmas"	Jim Brickman	—	—	4	—	Homecoming
"—" denotes releases that did not chart

=== Music videos ===
Year	Video	Director
1997	"Maybe He'll Notice Her Now" (with Mindy McCready)	Jim Hershleder
2007	"Coming Home for Christmas" (with Jim Brickman)	Glenn Sweitzer
