= I'm Still Here (album) =

Studio album by Mindy McCready
- Released: March 23, 2010
- Genre: Country
- Length: 40:36
- Label: Linus Entertainment
- Producers: Christopher Jak, Trey Bruce, Jimmy Nichols

Mindy McCready chronology
Mindy McCready (2002)	I'm Still Here (2010)

Singles from I'm Still Here
- 1. "I'm Still Here" Released: 2008; 2. "I Want a Man" Released: 2010

I'm Still Here is the fifth and final studio album by American country music artist Mindy McCready. It was released on March 23, 2010, by Linus Entertainment. The album includes the single "I'm Still Here," as well as re-recordings of her 1996 singles "Guys Do It All the Time" and "Ten Thousand Angels." Mindy performed on Fox & Friends to promote the album in April 2010. This is McCready's final release before her suicide in 2013.

== Critical reception ==
Professional ratings
Review scores
Source	Rating
AllMusic	3/5 stars
Country Weekly	2.5/5 stars
Entertainment Weekly	B
Slant Magazine	2.5/5 stars

Stephen Thomas Erlewine of AllMusic gave the album three out of five stars, stating "the songs are generally a mixed bag, veering from sweetly melancholy to syrupy, but McCready has never been more sensitive as a vocalist, pulling the album through the rough patches and convincingly selling the notion that she’s a sober survivor." Jessica Phillips of Country Weekly magazine rated it two-and-a-half stars out of five, saying that it "peaks" with the title track. She said that McCready's vocals were "confident" but added that the album was a "hodgepodge of songs."

== Track listing ==
No.	Title	Writer(s)	Length
1.	"Wrong Again"	Gary Burr, Helen Darling	3:19
2.	"By Her Side"	Whitney Duncan, Blu Sanders	3:53
3.	"I Want a Man"	McCready, Robin Lee Bruce, Billy Crain	3:35
4.	"I'm Still Here"	McCready, Trey Bruce, Rachel Thibodeau	4:10
5.	"I Want to Love You"	Lisa Carver, Shelly Fairchild, Stephony Smith	3:38
6.	"Songs About You"	Blair Daly, Hillary Lindsey, Troy Verges	3:33
7.	"The Way You Make Me Melt"	McCready, Bruce, Thibodeau	4:25
8.	"The Dance"	Tony Arata	4:10
9.	"I Hate That I Love You"	Ashley Gorley, Wade Kirby, Bryan Simpson	2:39
10.	"Fades"	Kyle Jacobs, Melissa Peirce	3:26
11.	"By Her Side" (Acoustic Version)	Duncan, Sanders	3:48
Total length:			40:36

Bonus tracks
No.	Title	Writer(s)	Length
1.	"Guys Do It All the Time" (Newly Updated Version)	Kim Tribble, Robert Whiteside	3:17
2.	"Ten Thousand Angels" (Newly Updated Version)	Billy Henderson, Steven D. Jones	3:54

== Personnel ==
- Matt Billingslea – drums
- Stevie Blacke – synthesizer strings
- Richard "Spady" Brannan – bass guitar
- Mike Brignardello – bass guitar
- Trey Bruce – electric guitar, percussion
- Pat Buchanan – electric guitar
- Larry Byrom – acoustic guitar
- Smith Curry – pedal steel guitar, dobro
- Paul Franklin – pedal steel guitar
- Jason "Slim" Gambill – electric guitar
- Tony Harrell – keyboards, piano
- Christopher Jak – acoustic guitar, electric guitar, background vocals
- Jeremy Lawton – keyboards, piano
- Robin Lee – background vocals
- Paul Leim – drums
- Mindy McCready – lead vocals
- Jerry McPherson – electric guitar
- Brent Mason – electric guitar
- Stewart Meyers – bass guitar
- Greg Morrow – drums
- Wendy Moten – background vocals
- Jimmy Nichols – keyboards, piano, background vocals
- John Osborne – electric guitar
- Michael Spriggs – acoustic guitar
- Stephanie Lane Stephenson – background vocals
- Crystal Taliaferro – background vocals
- Rachel Thibodeau – background vocals
- Patrick Warren – keyboards, piano
- Charlie Worsham – mandolin
- Jonathan Yudkin – cello, viola, violin
