= I'm Not So Tough =

Studio album by Mindy McCready
- Released: September 14, 1999
- Genres: Country; rock
- Length: 39:34
- Label: BNA Records
- Producers: Csaba Petocz; Billy Joe Walker, Jr.

Mindy McCready chronology
If I Don't Stay the Night (1997)	I'm Not So Tough (1999)	Mindy McCready (2002)

Singles from I'm Not So Tough
- 1. "One in a Million" Released: June 14, 1999; 2. "All I Want Is Everything" Released: August 30, 1999

Professional ratings
Review scores
Source	Rating
Allmusic	3/5 stars
Hartford Courant	(mixed)
People	(favorable)
Q	3/5 stars

I'm Not So Tough is the third studio album by American country music artist Mindy McCready, released September 14, 1999 via BNA Records; it was her last album with the label before getting dropped. The album was produced with new collaborators Billy Joe Walker Jr. and Csaba Petocz.

The album itself received a much more mixed reception from music critics. Furthermore, it was not as commercially successful as her previous two releases; it reached number 17 on the US Top Country Albums chart. Only two singles in total were released from the album, "One in a Million" and "All I Want Is Everything", the former only being included on the international edition of the album. The two singles both hit number 57 on the US Hot Country Songs chart. As of 2013, the album has sold 144,000 copies, a commercial failure compared to her previous albums.

== Content ==
The song "Thunder and Roses" would be covered by Pam Tillis for her 2001 studio album of the same name, where it would be released as a single. The title track was initially recorded by Dutch singer Ilse DeLange in 1998 as her debut single. "Take Me Apart" would be covered by Tina Arena in 2004. The international edition bonus track "I Don't Want You to Go" would be recorded by co-writer Carolyn Dawn Johnson in 2001 for her debut studio album Room with a View, where it became a top-ten hit for her in 2002. Lead single "One in a Million" is only included on non-US editions of the album.

== Track listing ==
North American edition
No.	Title	Writer(s)	Length
1.	"I'm Not So Tough"	Bruce Bouton; Hillary Lindsey; Robert Ellis Orrall	4:11
2.	"Tumble and Roll"	Al Anderson; Kim Carnes; Carolyn Dawn Johnson	3:08
3.	"All I Want Is Everything"	Matraca Berg; Marshall Chapman	2:45
4.	"Two Different Things"	Bouton; H. Lindsey; Gary Burr	4:24
5.	"Dream On"	Mark Selby; Tia Sillers	4:21
6.	"I've Got a Feeling"	Kevin "Swine" Grantt; Leslie Satcher	3:05
7.	"Thunder and Roses"	Marv Green; Chris Lindsey; Aimee Mayo	3:13
8.	"Over and Over"	Mayo; C. Lindsey	3:56
9.	"Lucky Me"	Tommy Lee James; Kim Richey; Jennifer Kimball	3:06
10.	"Hold Me"	Monty Criswell; Lee Thomas Miller	3:27
11.	"Take Me Apart"	Green; Mayo; Fiona Kernaghan	4:00
Total length:			39:34

International Edition
No.	Title	Writer(s)	Length
1.	"I'm Not So Tough"	Bouton; H. Lindsey; Orrall	4:11
2.	"Lucky Me"	James; Richey; Kimball	3:06
3.	"Dream On"	Selby; Sillers	4:21
4.	"Two Different Things"	Bouton; H. Lindsey; Burr	4:24
5.	"I Love You Too" (Bonus track)	Green; C. Lindsey; Mayo
6.	"Thunder and Roses"	Green; C. Lindsey; Mayo	3:13
7.	"I've Got a Feeling"	Grantt; Satcher	3:05
8.	"Tumble and Roll"	Anderson; Carnes; Johnson	3:08
9.	"One in a Million" (Bonus track)	Beth Neilsen Chapman; Annie Roboff	3:25
10.	"I Don't Want You to Go" (Bonus track)	Tommy Polk; Johnson
11.	"Hold Me"	Criswell; Miller	3:27
12.	"All I Want Is Everything"	Berg; Chapman	2:45
13.	"Take Me Apart"	Green; Mayo; Kernaghan	4:00
14.	"Over and Over"	Mayo; C. Lindsey	3:56

== Personnel ==
- Al Anderson – six-string bass guitar, 12-string electric guitar, acoustic guitar
- Eddie Bayers – drums, percussion
- Mike Brignardello – bass guitar
- Larry Byrom – acoustic guitar
- Kim Carnes – background vocals
- Paulinho da Costa – percussion
- Glen Duncan – fiddle
- Thom Flora – background vocals
- Shannon Forrest – drums
- Larry Franklin – fiddle
- Paul Franklin – dobro, steel guitar
- Wes Hightower – background vocals
- Carl Jackson – background vocals
- Carolyn Dawn Johnson – background vocals
- Jeff King – electric guitar
- Paul Leim – drums, percussion
- Randy McCormick – Hammond organ, synthesizer
- Mindy McCready – lead vocals
- Liana Manis – background vocals
- Brent Mason – electric guitar
- Steve Nathan – piano
- Jamie O'Neal – background vocals
- Matt Rollings – Hammond organ, piano
- Brent Rowan – electric guitar
- John Wesley Ryles – background vocals
- Leslie Satcher – background vocals
- Lisa Silver – background vocals
- Michael Spriggs – acoustic guitar
- Chris Stone – recorder
- Biff Watson – acoustic guitar
- Lonnie Wilson – drums
- Glenn Worf – bass guitar

== Charts ==
Chart (1999)	Peak position
Canadian Country Albums (RPM)	13
US Top Country Albums (Billboard)	17
US Billboard 200	155
