= Michael Alfonso (murderer) =

American fugitive (born 1969)

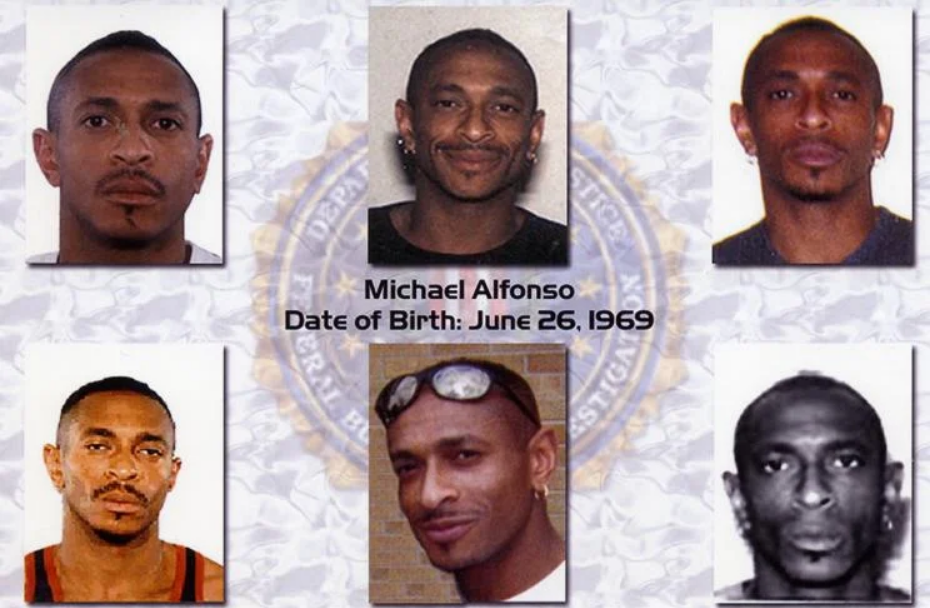
- Born: Michael Johnson; June 26, 1969 (age 57); Illinois, U.S.
- Other names: Michael A. Johnson; Michael Alfonso Johnson; Milton Lenon; Adolfo Ruiz
- Occupation: Laborer
- Known for: Stalking, assaulting, and murdering ex-girlfriends
- Convictions: First degree murder (x2); Intentional homicide of an unborn child Aggravated stalking Kidnapping; Sexual assault (x2); Concealment of homicidal death Criminal possession of a weapon Unlawful possession of a weapon by a felon Aggravated battery
- Penalty: Life imprisonment

Details
- Victims: Sumanear Yang, who was carrying his baby; Genoveva Franco Velasquez
- Span of crimes: 1992–2001
- Country: United States
- State: Illinois
- Locations: DuPage and Kendall County
- Date apprehended: July 15, 2004
- Imprisoned at: Stateville Correctional Center

Michael Alfonso (born Michael Johnson; June 26, 1969) is an American former fugitive who was convicted of multiple felonies, including two counts of murder, in the state of Illinois. In January 2003, a year and half after the second 2001 murder, he was placed on the FBI's "Ten Most Wanted Fugitives" list, with a $50,000 reward for information leading to his arrest. After a year and half of being on the run, he was captured during a manhunt in Mexico and extradited back to the U.S.

Alfonso's murders are disclosed and featured on Fox television series America's Most Wanted, Investigation Discovery series I (Almost) Got Away with It, and the Unsolved Mysteries series twice.

== Prior convictions ==
Alfonso was convicted in 1990 of raping a 17-year-old girl repeatedly in an apartment complex lobby, and required to register as a sex offender.

Five years later in 1995, he was convicted of aggravated battery and possession of a weapon by a felon and was sentenced to four years in prison; he was released in 1998.

== Flight and capture ==
After the second murder, on June 6, 2001, Alfonso went on the run and escaped to Mexico. In January 2003, the Federal Bureau of Investigation (FBI) placed him on the bureau's Ten Most Wanted Fugitives list, as fugitive #476.

The chase lasted over three years and covered three Central American countries, including Mexico, Guatemala and Belize. Within months of his listing on the FBI's Ten Most Wanted Fugitives list, Alfonso's crimes were featured across two episodes of the television show America's Most Wanted. Due to the media coverage, Mexican federal agents and American FBI agents received many tips on Alfonso's whereabouts. Once his location was verified, FBI agents were dispatched to assist Mexican authorities with his capture.

On July 15, 2004, he was captured and extradited back to the U.S. soon after. He was charged with multiple crimes, including stalking, assault, sexual assault, kidnapping, homicide of an unborn child, and murder.

== Conviction and sentencing ==
Alfonso entered a plea of guilty to two counts of first-degree murder for the slayings of Sumanear Yang, 23, and Genoveva "Gena" Franco-Velasquez, 28. In September 1992, Yang, who was pregnant with Alfonso's child, was shot to death on the side of the road whilst in the passenger's seat of Alfonso’s car. Her body was found on November 8, 1992, near Yorkville, Illinois. Years later, in the summer of 2001, Michael Alfonso embarked on a new relationship with recently separated mother, Gena Velasquez. On June 5, 2001, Velasquez informed Alfonso that she and her husband were planning on fixing their marriage and getting back together. On June 6, 2001, Alfonso confronted Velasquez outside a McDonald's restaurant in Carol Stream, Illinois, where Velasquez was employed. An argument ensued, and Alfonso shot Velasquez several times at point blank range, killing her.

The prosecutor believed that Alfonso entered his guilty plea to avoid the possibility of a death sentence.

== In popular media ==
Alfonso's fugitive case was reported on by the American docudrama series Unsolved Mysteries. The series used re-enactments and interviews with key persons to reveal the incidents of real mysteries that at that time were unsolved. (Episode information: season 12, episode 46; titled: "Wanted: Michael Alfonso"; originally aired on October 1, 2001.)

Alfonso was added to the FBI's Ten Most Wanted Fugitives list in January 2003. Within six months of his fugitive listing, the Fox television series America's Most Wanted reported on Alfonso twice in March and May 2004. FBI spokesman Frank Bochte announced, "He was arrested recently after a person in Mexico recognized him from the television show America's Most Wanted and called authorities."

An episode of I (Almost) Got Away with It titled "Got Dumped" (season 1, episode 2), a documentary series on the Investigation Discovery channel, originally aired on January 19, 2010. It reported on Alfonso's murders and violence against multiple women. The documentary also covered his escape to Mexico, where he attempted to start a new life. While on the run, he attempted to live in parts of Mexico, Guatemala and Belize before returning to Mexico, where he was apprehended.

== See also ==
- List of homicides in Illinois
