= Mindy McCready (album) =

Studio album by Mindy McCready
- Released: March 26, 2002
- Recorded: at The Sound Shop Recording Studios, Nashville, Tennessee
- Genre: Country
- Length: 41:23
- Label: Capitol Records Nashville
- Producer: Billy Joe Walker, Jr.; Mike Clute; Bobby Huff

Mindy McCready chronology
I'm Not So Tough (1999)	Mindy McCready (2002)	I'm Still Here (2010)

Singles from Mindy McCready
- 1. "Scream" Released: October 30, 2000; 2. "Maybe, Maybe Not" Released: January 14, 2002; 3. "Lips Like Yours" Released: May 2002

Professional ratings
Review scores
Source	Rating
About.com	(favorable)
Allmusic	3/5 stars
Entertainment Weekly	C

Mindy McCready is the fourth studio album from American country music artist Mindy McCready. It was released on March 26, 2002 by Capitol Records Nashville; it was her only album with the label.

== Content ==
The album included three singles, "Scream", "Maybe, Maybe Not" (later recorded by Mila Mason on her 2003 album Stained Glass Window), and "Lips Like Yours". Steve Mandile, lead singer of the band Sixwire, co-wrote the track "Don't Speak". "The Fire" was originally recorded by Chely Wright on her 1999 album Single White Female.

== Track listing ==
All tracks produced by Billy Joe Walker Jr. except "Maybe, Maybe Not" and "Be With Me", produced by Mike Clute and Bobby Huff

Mindy McCready track listing
No.	Title	Writer(s)	Length
1.	"Maybe, Maybe Not"	Jim Collins; Mila Mason	3:38
2.	"Lips Like Yours"	Alex Call; Bobby Whiteside	3:52
3.	"Lovin' Your Man"	Steve Booker; Robin Lerner	3:54
4.	"Be with Me"	Stephanie Bentley; George Teren	3:51
5.	"The Fire"	Leslie Satcher	3:12
6.	"Scream"	Helen Darling; Tammy "Jenai" Wagoner	3:38
7.	"I Just Want Love"	Jim Daddario; Will Robinson; Aaron Sain	3:44
8.	"Don't Speak"	Steve Mandile; Phil Vassar; Julie Wood	4:12
9.	"If I Feel Your Hand"	Dillon Dixon; Jennifer Hicks	4:00
10.	"You Get to Me"	Brett James; Troy Verges	3:32
11.	"Tremble"	James; Holly Lamar	3:50
Total length:			41:23

== Personnel ==
- Larry Beaird – acoustic guitar
- Larry Byrom – acoustic guitar, electric guitar, slide guitar
- Pat Coil – synthesizer
- Glen Duncan – fiddle
- Thom Flora – background vocals
- Paul Franklin – steel guitar
- David Grissom – electric guitar
- Aubrey Haynie – fiddle, mandolin, laughs
- Wes Hightower – background vocals
- Bobby Huff – drums, background vocals
- Joanna Janét – background vocals
- John Barlow Jarvis – keyboards, Hammond organ, piano, Wurlitzer
- Carolyn Dawn Johnson – background vocals
- Mary Ann Kennedy – background vocals
- Paul Leim – drums, percussion
- B. James Lowry – acoustic guitar
- Mindy McCready – lead vocals
- Brent Mason – electric guitar, gut string guitar
- Gene Miller – background vocals
- Duncan Mullins – bass guitar
- Steve Nathan – keyboards, Hammond organ, piano, synthesizer, Wurlitzer
- Jimmy Nichols – keyboards, piano
- Dale Oliver – electric guitar
- Russ Pahl – Dobro
- Pam Rose – background vocals
- Lisa Silver – background vocals
- Billy Joe Walker Jr. – acoustic guitar, electric guitar
- Biff Watson – acoustic guitar
- Glenn Worf – bass guitar
- Reese Wynans – Hammond organ

== Charts ==
Chart (2002)	Peak position
US Top Country Albums (Billboard)	29
