= Ten Thousand Angels (song) =

Single by Mindy McCready

from the album Ten Thousand Angels
- B-side: "Not Somebody's Fool"
- Released: February 3, 1996
- Recorded: 1995
- Genre: Country
- Length: 3:25
- Label: BNA
- Songwriters: Billy Henderson, Steven Dale Jones
- Producers: David Malloy, Norro Wilson

Mindy McCready singles chronology
"Ten Thousand Angels" (1996)	"Guys Do It All the Time" (1996)

"Ten Thousand Angels" is the debut single by American country music artist Mindy McCready, released in February 1996. It was written by Billy Henderson and Steven Dale Jones and is the title track of her debut album Ten Thousand Angels. The song reached No. 6 on the Billboard Hot Country Singles & Tracks chart. It was later re-recorded for McCready's fifth and final studio album I'm Still Here (2010).

== Content ==
The narrator wishes for 10,000 angels to help her resist a man who has hurt her before.

== Critical reception ==
Deborah Evans Price, of Billboard magazine reviewed the song favorably, saying that McCready has a "pretty voice that shines on this tune about a woman trying to escape temptation that may lead to heartbreak." While she calls it a "nice song", she goes on to say that she should use her voice to record something "a little meatier."

== Music video ==
The music video was directed by Jim Hershleder and premiered in early 1996.

== Chart performance ==
"Ten Thousand Angels" debuted at number 74 on the U.S. Billboard Hot Country Singles & Tracks for the week of February 3, 1996.

Chart (1996)	Peak position
Canada Country Singles (RPM)	13
US Bubbling Under Hot 100 (Billboard)	24
US Hot Country Songs (Billboard)	6

=== Year-end charts ===
Chart (1996)	Position
US Country Songs (Billboard)	50
