= Mindy McCready =

American country music singer (1975–2013)

- McCready in 1996

Background information
- Born: Malinda Gayle McCready; November 30, 1975; Fort Myers, Florida, U.S.
- Origin: Nashville, Tennessee, U.S.
- Died: February 17, 2013 (aged 37) Heber Springs, Arkansas, U.S.
- Cause of death: Suicide by gunshot
- Genre: Country
- Occupation: Singer
- Instrument: Vocals
- Years active: 1995–2013
- Labels: BNA, Capitol Nashville, Iconic

Malinda Gayle McCready (November 30, 1975 – February 17, 2013) was an American country music singer. Active from 1995 until her suicide in 2013, she recorded a total of five studio albums. Her debut album, 1996's Ten Thousand Angels, was released on BNA Records and was certified 2× Platinum by the RIAA, while 1997's If I Don't Stay the Night was certified Gold. 1999's I'm Not So Tough, her final album for BNA, was less successful, and she left the label. A self-titled fourth album followed in 2002 on Capitol Records. McCready's fifth and final studio album, I'm Still Here, was released in March 2010 on Iconic Records.

McCready's first four studio albums yielded twelve singles on the Billboard country singles charts. This figure includes the No. 1 hit "Guys Do It All the Time", as well as the Top 10 hits "Ten Thousand Angels" and "A Girl's Gotta Do (What a Girl's Gotta Do)".

Although she had not charted a single since 2002, McCready received significant media coverage regarding her troubled personal life and suicide attempts and her eventual death by suicide at age 37.

== Career ==
=== Music ===
Born Malinda Gayle McCready in Fort Myers, Florida, McCready began singing in her local Pentecostal church at age 3 and graduated from high school at the age of 16 to begin her music career early.

When she was 18, McCready moved to Nashville, where she was signed by BNA Records. Her debut album, Ten Thousand Angels, was released in 1996 and sold two million copies. The album produced four chart singles on the country charts: the title track at No. 6, followed by her first and only Number One hit, "Guys Do It All the Time". This song, in turn, was succeeded by "Maybe He'll Notice Her Now", a duet with Richie McDonald, then the lead vocalist of Lonestar. The fourth and final single, "A Girl's Gotta Do (What a Girl's Gotta Do)", peaked at No. 4.

In 1997, she was nominated for Top New Female Vocalist at the Academy of Country Music Awards, but lost to LeAnn Rimes.

The next year, McCready released the album If I Don't Stay the Night. The album spawned three singles, "What If I Do", "The Other Side of This Kiss", and "You'll Never Know". The album sold 825,000 copies.

In 1999, McCready released I'm Not So Tough. The first single, "All I Want Is Everything", failed to break the top 50. The album was a commercial failure, selling 144,000 copies. Soon after, McCready's record company dropped her. McCready was then signed by Capitol Records. She released her self-titled album with Capitol in 2002 to disappointing sales and was dropped by Capitol later that year.

In May 2008, McCready released the single "I'm Still Here" via her official website. She also announced that she had been working on a documentary, a new album, and a reality show. McCready's critically acclaimed fifth album, I'm Still Here, was released in March 2010.

On February 18, 2013, the day after McCready's death, her final song, "I'll See You Yesterday" was released.

=== Reality television ===
In June 2009, McCready signed on to appear on the reality series Celebrity Rehab with Dr. Drew. The series aired and depicted her struggle with substance addiction. She later discussed her recovery and possible studio work with Todd Gaither on a March 2010 episode of The View.

In mid-2011, McCready appeared on an episode of each of Celebrity Close Calls and Celebrity Ghost Stories. She also appeared on the December 9, 2011, episode of 20/20, where she discussed her son Zander, her producer boyfriend David Wilson, and new music.

== Personal life ==
In 1997, McCready became engaged to actor Dean Cain; the couple ended their engagement and separated the following year. McCready also dated then-NHL hockey player Drake Berehowsky.

In December 2003, she began dating aspiring singer William Patrick "Billy" McKnight. On May 8, 2005, McKnight was arrested and charged with attempted murder after beating and choking her. After reporting to People magazine that she had cut ties with McKnight, McCready was found unconscious in a hotel lobby in Indian Rocks Beach, Florida, after attempting suicide in July 2005. She was hospitalized for a drug overdose after consuming a large amount of undisclosed drugs with alcohol. Despite this, the couple soon got back together and McCready became pregnant. In September 2005, while she was pregnant with McKnight's child, she attempted suicide again by overdosing on antidepressants. In March 2006, McCready gave birth to a son, Zander Ryan McCready.

On December 17, 2008, paramedics were called to McCready's Nashville home after an apparent suicide attempt; they transported her to a hospital after finding wounds on her wrists.

In 2009, she joined the cast of Celebrity Rehab 3 with Dr. Drew Pinsky.

On May 25, 2010, McCready was hospitalized in Cape Coral, Florida, for a possible drug overdose; she may have had a reaction to Darvocet her mother had given her. She was released later that day and returned home.

A pornographic videotape of McCready and an ex-boyfriend referred to as "Peter" went on sale by Vivid Entertainment in 2010.

In April 2012, McCready gave birth to her second child, a son named Zayne. The child's father, record producer David Wilson, was found dead on January 13, 2013, at McCready's home, of an apparent self-inflicted gunshot wound. The Cleburne County, Arkansas, sheriff's department opened an investigation into Wilson's death. Following Wilson's death, McCready released a statement in which she referred to him as her "soulmate" and "life partner".

=== Roger Clemens affair ===
In April 2008, the New York Daily News reported a possible long-term relationship between McCready and baseball star Roger Clemens that began when she was 15. Clemens' attorney admitted that a relationship existed but described McCready as a "close family friend." He also stated that McCready had traveled on Clemens' plane and that Clemens' wife knew McCready. Clemens issued a statement saying, "I have made mistakes in my personal life for which I am sorry."

In November 2008, McCready spoke in more detail to Inside Edition about her affair with Clemens. She stated that their relationship lasted for a decade, ending when Clemens refused to marry her. Additionally, McCready said that she was 16 when they first met and that the relationship didn't become sexual until several years later.

=== Legal issues ===
In August 2004, McCready was arrested in Tennessee for using a fake prescription to buy the painkiller OxyContin. Although she initially denied the charge, she pleaded guilty and was fined US$4,000 (equivalent to $6,800 in 2025), sentenced to three years of probation, and ordered to perform 200 hours of community service.

In May 2005, McCready was stopped by Nashville police for speeding, then arrested and charged with driving under the influence and driving with a suspended license. A jury later found her not guilty on the charges of DUI but guilty of driving with a suspended license. That July, she was charged in Arizona with identity theft, unlawful use of transportation, unlawful imprisonment, and hindering prosecution. An arrest warrant was issued for her the following month for violation of her probation when she left Tennessee without her probation officer's permission. She was also charged with not reporting to her probation officer during July. She was finally arrested in Florida and returned to Tennessee. She faced a hearing later that year on charges of violating her probation on a drug charge by failing to check in with her probation officer and leaving the state without permission to go to Florida.

In July 2007, McCready was arrested in her hometown of Fort Myers, Florida, and charged with battery and resisting arrest for an apparent scuffle with her mother. The following week, she was taken into custody at the Nashville International Airport for violating probation. In September, McCready was sentenced to a year in jail for violating probation. In addition to the jail time, she was ordered to serve two more years of probation and perform 200 additional hours of community service. She was released from jail in December.

In June 2008, McCready was arrested in Tennessee for violating the terms of her probation set in September 2007. Sentenced to 60 days in jail, McCready turned herself in on September 30, 2008. After serving half of her sentence, she was released early for good behavior on October 30, 2008.

McCready was associated with and allegedly victimized by con man Jonathan Roda. The case was featured on the 2012 episode "Got to Make You a Superstar" of the series I (Almost) Got Away with It.

== Death ==
On February 17, 2013, McCready's neighbors called the Sheriff's Office of Cleburne County, Arkansas, reporting gunshots. McCready was found dead on her front porch from a self-inflicted gunshot wound, the same place where David Wilson, her former boyfriend and the father of her second son, had fatally shot himself one month prior. She was 37 years old. She also shot and killed Wilson's pet dog before her suicide. McCready is interred at Alva Cemetery in Alva, Florida.

== Discography ==
Studio albums

- Ten Thousand Angels (1996)
- If I Don't Stay the Night (1997)
- I'm Not So Tough (1999)
- Mindy McCready (2002)
- I'm Still Here (2010)

== Awards and nominations ==
Year	Organization	Award	Nominee/Work	Result
1997	American Music Awards	Favorite Country New Artist	Mindy McCready	Nominated
1997	Academy of Country Music Awards	Top New Female Vocalist	Mindy McCready	Nominated
1997	TNN/Music City News Country Awards	Female Star of Tomorrow	Mindy McCready	Nominated
