= The Arrows (Canadian band) =

Canadian new wave band

- Origin: Toronto, Ontario, Canada
- Genres: New wave
- Years active: 1981–1986
- Labels: A&M Records, Avion Records, El Mocambo Records, Spontaneous Records
- Members: Dean McTaggart; Michael Sloski; Gabor Szepesi; Hendrik Rilk; Rusty McCarthy; Rob Gusevs; Earl Seymour; Doug Macaskill; Glenn Olive; Bobby Economou

The Arrows were a Canadian new wave band active during the 1980s (and not to be confused with the British band Arrows).

== Biography ==
The Arrows were formed in 1981 by vocalist Dean McTaggart, the group's only consistent member. They recorded a single ("Treat Her Right" b/w "Come On Up") in 1981. The following year, the group issued a 4 song mini-album called Misunderstood which was recorded at Grant Avenue Studios and produced by Daniel Lanois.

In 1984, the band landed a deal with A&M Records. With the help of producer David Tyson, who also became McTaggart's frequent writing partner, the Arrows' 1984 debut album Stand Back was a national success in Canada, providing a top 40 hit with "Meet Me in the Middle". The album sold well, and the band found themselves as the opening act on the UK leg of Chris de Burgh's 1984 tour.

Upon returning home, they went back to the studio for work on their second album The Lines Are Open, which saw its release in October 1985. The singles "Heart of the City", "Talk Talk" and "Chains" all saw success in Canada, but pressures from management for a breakout hit were causing problems within the band, and following a cross-Canada tour, the group called it quits at the end of 1986.

In 1995, a CD compilation Talk Talk: The Best of The Arrows surfaced on a German import label that contained the majority of the tracks from their first two albums. Stand Back was re-issued on CD in 2011, and The Lines Are Open was re-issued in 2013.

McTaggart continued with his songwriting career, writing hit songs for artists such as "Heaven Help My Heart" by Wynonna, and, as co-writer, "Unsung Hero" by Terri Clark and several hits by Amanda Marshall, notably "Birmingham" and her Canadian AC No. 1 hit "Dark Horse", which also became a hit for Mila Mason.

== 1981 line-up ==
This line-up recorded the 1981 debut single "Treat Her Right" b/w "Come On Up"

- Vocals - Dean McTaggart
- Drums and Percussion - Michael Sloski
- Keyboards - Gabor Szepesi
- Bass - Hendrik Rilk
- Guitars - Rusty McCarthy

== 1982 line-up ==
This line-up recorded the 1982 4-song mini-album Misunderstood.

- Vocals - Dean McTaggart
- Drums and Percussion - Michael Sloski
- Keyboards - Rob Gusevs
- Bass - Hendrik Rilk
- Guitars - Rusty McCarthy
- Saxophone - Earl Seymour

== 1984 line-up ==
This line recorded the 1984 album Stand Back.

- Vocals - Dean McTaggart
- Guitars - Doug Macaskill
- Keyboards - Rob Gusevs
- Saxophone - Earl Seymour

With session musicians:

- Bass - Peter Bleakney, Howard Ayee
- Drums - Michael Sloski, Gary Craig
- Percussion - Matt Zimbel
- Keyboards, Vocals – David Tyson
- Backing Vocals – Al Van Wart, Eddie Schwartz

== 1985 line-up ==
This line recorded the 1985 album The Lines Are Open.

- Vocals - Dean McTaggart
- Keyboards - Rob Gusevs
- Saxophone - Earl Seymour
- Guitars - Doug Macaskill
- Bass - Glenn Olive
- Drums - Bobby Economou

With session musicians:

- Alto Saxophone - Vernon Dorge
- Backing Vocals - Charity Brown, David Blamires, John Rutledge, Sharon Lee Williams, David Tyson
- Percussion - Memo Acevedo
- Trumpet - Rick Waychesko, Steve McDade

== Discography ==
=== Studio albums ===
- Stand Back (1984), A&M Records
- The Lines Are Open (1985), Avion Records

=== Compilation albums ===
- Talk Talk: The Best of The Arrows (1995), Long Island Records

=== EPs ===
- Misunderstood (1982), Spontaneous Records

=== Singles ===
- "Treat Her Right" (1981), El Mocambo Records
- "Come On Up" (1981), El Mocambo Records
- "Lovelight" (1982), Spontaneous Records
- "If It's Love" (1982), Spontaneous Records
- "Meet Me in the Middle" (1984), A&M Records - Canada #30
- "Say It Isn't True" (1984), A&M Records
- "Never Be Another One" (1984), A&M Records
- "Girl in 313" (1984), A&M Records
- "Talk Talk" (1985), A&M Records - Canada #47
- "Easy Street" (1985), A&M Records
- "I Owe You" (1985), A&M Records
- "Heart of the City" (1986), A&M Records - Canada #57
- "Tell It To My Heart" (1986), A&M Records
- "Chains" (1986), A&M Records - Canada #93
- "Wild One" (1986), A&M Records
