= That's Enough of That =

Studio album by Mila Mason
- Released: September 17, 1996
- Genre: Country
- Length: 33:25
- Label: Atlantic
- Producer: Blake Mevis

Mila Mason chronology
That's Enough of That (1996)	The Strong One (1998)

Professional ratings
Review scores
Source	Rating
Allmusic	3/5 stars
Country Standard Time	?

That's Enough of That is the debut studio album by American country music artist Mila Mason. It was released in 1996 (see 1996 in country music) on Atlantic Records Nashville. It was produced by Blake Mevis.

The album produced three hit singles, all three of which charted both the Billboard Hot Country Singles & Tracks (now Hot Country Songs) charts and the Canadian RPM country charts. "That's Enough of That", the first, reached number 18 in the US and number 30 in Canada. "Dark Horse" was originally recorded by its co-writer, Amanda Marshall, on her self-titled debut album. Her version was a number 12 on the RPM Top Singles charts in 1996, while Mason's version was a number 21 country hit in the US and number 12 country hit in Canada. "That's the Kinda Love (That I'm Talkin' About)", the final single, was number 59 in the US and 66 in Canada.

== Track listing ==
No.	Title	Writer(s)	Length
1.	"That's What I Call Love"	Mickey Cates, Tommy Lee James	3:35
2.	"Hot to Molly"	Raymond Faulknor, Blake Lasater, Ed Lasater	3:21
3.	"Tonight I Know I Will"	Daniele Alexander, Gary Scruggs	3:23
4.	"That's Enough of That"	Randy Albright, Mark D. Sanders, Lisa Silver	2:44
5.	"I Don't Need a Man to Live With"	Alexander, Karl Hasten	2:53
6.	"Heart Without a Past"	Bob DiPiero, John Scott Sherrill	3:27
7.	"That's the Kinda Love (That I'm Talkin' About)"	Lew Bakey	3:31
8.	"Troublemaker"	Suzi Ragsdale, Verlon Thompson	3:00
9.	"I Do"	Roberta Schiller	2:32
10.	"Dark Horse"	Amanda Marshall, Dean McTaggart, David Tyson	4:59

== Personnel ==
From liner notes.

- Larry Byrom – slide guitar
- Mark Casstevens – acoustic guitar
- Glen Duncan – fiddle
- Sonny Garrish – pedal steel guitar
- John Hobbs – keyboards
- Christopher James – background vocals
- David James – background vocals
- Kirk "Jelly Roll" Johnson – harmonica
- Liana Manis – background vocals
- Brent Mason – electric guitar
- Mila Mason – lead vocals
- Matt Rollings – piano, keyboards
- Billy Joe Walker, Jr. – acoustic guitar
- Lonnie Wilson – drums
- Glenn Worf – bass guitar

== Chart performance ==
Chart (1996)	Peak position
U.S. Billboard Top Country Albums	43
U.S. Billboard Top Heatseekers	37
Canadian RPM Country Albums	20
