= Snow Blankets the Night =

EP by Teddy Geiger
- Released: December 12, 2006
- Recorded: Late 2006
- Genre: Pop
- Length: 25:08 (with music video)
- Label: Sony BMG/Columbia

Teddy Geiger chronology
Underage Thinking (2006)	Snow Blankets the Night (2006)	Living Alone (2010)

Snow Blankets the Night is an EP by the American singer-songwriter Teddy Geiger. Following the success of her debut album Underage Thinking, Geiger released a six song Christmas EP on December 12, 2006 only through the U.S. iTunes.

The EP includes an original Christmas song written by Geiger herself entitled "I Found an Angel" and two other new original songs, "Listen" and "Our Eyes" as well. A cover of Mariah Carey's "All I Want for Christmas Is You" is also featured on the EP, also containing live versions of her singles "These Walls" and "For You I Will (Confidence)" recorded at the Harro East Ballroom in her hometown of Rochester, New York. Also, the music video for "These Walls" is included in the EP.

A promotional CD single of "I Found An Angel" and "All I Want For Christmas Is You" was sent to select US radio stations.

== Track listing ==
1. "I Found an Angel" (Teddy Geiger) – 3:33
2. "Listen" (Geiger) – 3:28
3. "Our Eyes" (Geiger) – 3:51
4. "All I Want for Christmas Is You" (Mariah Carey, Walter Afanasieff) – 2:40
5. "These Walls" [live at Harro East Ballroom]" (Geiger, Beth Cohen, Peter Wallace) – 3:50
6. "For You I Will (Confidence)" [live at Harro East Ballroom]" (Geiger, Billy Mann) – 4:07
7. "These Walls" [music video] – 3:39
