= Underage Thinking =

Studio album by Teddy Geiger
- Released: March 21, 2006
- Recorded: 2005
- Studio: Turtle Sound Studios (Connecticut); Sony Music Studios (New York City); Steakhouse Studios (North Hollywood); Sound Decision (New York City)
- Genre: Pop rock, alternative rock
- Length: 40:53
- Label: Columbia
- Producer: Billy Mann, Paul Pimsler, Christopher Rojas

Teddy Geiger chronology
Step Ladder (EP) (2005)	Underage Thinking (2006)	Snow Blankets the Night (EP) (2006)

Alternative cover
- 'Look Where We Are Now' cover

Singles from Underage Thinking
- 1. "For You I Will (Confidence)" Released: June 27, 2006; 2. "These Walls" Released: September 2006

Professional ratings
Review scores
Source	Rating
AllMusic	4/5 stars
Blender	3/5 stars

Underage Thinking is the debut album by singer-songwriter Teddy Geiger, released on March 21, 2006. Geiger wrote or co-wrote all the songs featured on the album herself, as well as a cover of Avion's "Seven Days Without You".

== Album information ==
The album was produced by Billy Mann, Christopher Rojas and Paul Pimsler.

In its first week in the charts, the album sold over 56,500 copies, enough to debut at number eight (#8) in the Billboard 200. The album has sold 360,000+ copies, and is yet to be certified. The first single released from the album, "For You I Will (Confidence)", which also appears on Geiger's Step Ladder EP as just "Confidence", has been certified platinum according to Billboard.com.

A Japanese edition of the album was released on July 19, 2006, including the two bonus tracks "Do You Even Care" and "Hallelujah".

Geiger re-released the album on October 10, 2006. The special edition with second title 'Look Where We Are Now' includes a bonus DVD that includes the making of and final cuts for the music videos "For You I Will (Confidence)" and "These Walls". A home video of Teddy Geiger and a photo scrapbook are also featured on the DVD. The special edition includes remixes of Geiger's latest singles, a newly recorded track, and some never-before-heard demos that she made before her mainstream success with Underage Thinking. The audio portion of the re-release is available on iTunes and Napster along with the exclusive bonus track "Amazingly Fat Cows", one of the first songs Teddy recorded.

The song "Gentlemen" featured in the film Aquamarine (2006).

== Singles ==
- "For You I Will (Confidence)" is the first single from Underage Thinking. The song was released on September 6, 2005. Later, the song was released as a CD single on June 27, 2006. The song can also be found on her 2005 EP Step Ladder under the name "Confidence". The single version has more rock music influences. The single was certified platinum by RIAA on April 13, 2006.
- "These Walls" is Teddy Geiger's second single from her debut album. The single was released in September 2006 in the US. The song was less successful than "For You I Will".

== Track listings ==
=== Standard album ===
All lyrics are written by Teddy Geiger, except "Seven Days Without You" by Steve Bertrand and Stuart Brawley.

No.	Title	Music	Length
1.	"These Walls"	Geiger, Beth Cohen, Peter Wallace	3:39
2.	"For You I Will (Confidence)"	Geiger, Billy Mann	3:49
3.	"Night Air"	Geiger	3:43
4.	"Thinking Underage"	Geiger, Mann, Christopher Rojas	4:12
5.	"Look Where We Are Now"	Geiger, Mann	3:43
6.	"Air Dry"	Geiger, Mann	3:12
7.	"Seven Days Without You" (Avion cover)	Bertrand, Brawley	3:35
8.	"Try Too Hard"	Geiger	3:19
9.	"A Million Years"	Geiger	3:20
10.	"Possibilities"	Geiger, Mann	3:23
11.	"Gentlemen"	Geiger	4:06
12.	"Love Is a Marathon"	Geiger, Mann	3:52

=== Japanese bonus tracks ===
No.	Title	Length
13.	"Do You Even Care"	3:53
14.	"Hallelujah"	3:59

=== Special edition ===
CD part

All lyrics are written by Teddy Geiger.

No.	Title	Music	Length
13.	"As We Get Older"	Geiger	3:35
14.	"These Walls" (remix) (vs. MachoPsycho)	Geiger, Cohen, Wallace	5:05
15.	"For You I Will (Confidence)" (remix) (vs. MachoPsycho)	Geiger, Mann	5:08
16.	"Our Eyes" (demo)	Geiger	2:01
17.	"Look Where We Are Now" (demo)	Geiger, Mann	4:10
18.	"Gentlemen" (demo)	Geiger	3:37
19.	"Possibilities" (demo)	Geiger, Mann	3:15
20.	"Thousand Years" (demo)	Geiger	3:19
21.	"Amazingly Fat Cows" (hidden track)	Geiger	0:54

DVD part

1. "For You I Will (Confidence)" (video)
2. "For You I Will (Confidence)" (making of video)
3. "For You I Will (Confidence)" (live video)
4. "These Walls" (video)
5. "These Walls" (making of video)
6. A Day in the Life of Teddy Geiger
7. Home videos
8. Photo scrapbook
- Only tracks 14 and 15 and the hidden track were included on the Australian edition of the 'Look Where We Are Now' CD/DVD. This release also differs from the American one in that it is subtitled 'Australian Tour Signature Edition' and comes with Teddy's signature printed on the cover.

== Personnel ==
Adapted from the Underage Thinking media notes.

Musicians

- Teddy Geiger – bass, guitar, percussion, piano, arrangement, programming, vocals
- Billy Mann – bass, guitar, percussion, piano, arrangement, programming, background vocals
- Peter Wallace – bass, guitar, piano, Hammond/Wurlitzer, arrangement, programming
- Christopher Rojas – bass, guitar, piano, arrangement, programming
- Lee Levin – drums
- Dan Warner – guitar ("Million Years", "Possibilities", "Seven Days Without You")
- Paul Pimsler – guitar ("Try Too Hard")

Production

- Billy Mann – executive producer, engineering
- Christopher Rojas – additional production ("Thinking Underage"), engineering
- Peter Wallace – additional production ("Try Too Hard"), engineering
- Paul Pimsler – additional production ("Try Too Hard"), engineering
- Torre Catalano – production coordination
- Lana Israel – production coordination
- Andy Zulla – mixing
- Adam Ayan – mastering

Imagery

- Stephen Danelian – cover photo
- Teddy Geiger – illustrations
- Maria Paula Marulanda – art direction
- Daniel Moss – photography
- Gabrielle Revere – photography

== Charts ==
Chart performance for Underage Thinking
Chart (2006)	Peak position
Australian Albums (ARIA)	27
Canadian Albums (Nielsen SoundScan)	30
US Billboard 200	8
US Indie Store Album Sales (Billboard)	14
