= The Lines Are Open =

Studio album by the Arrows
- Released: 1985
- Studios: Sounds Interchange, Toronto, ON; Grant Avenue Studios, Hamilton, ON
- Genre: Pop/Rock
- Label: A&M
- Producer: David Tyson

The Arrows chronology
| Stand Back (1984) | The Lines Are Open (1985) | Talk Talk: The Best of The Arrows (1995) |

Professional ratings
Review scores
| Source | Rating |
|---|---|
| AllMusic | link |

The Lines Are Open is the second and final album by the Arrows released in 1985. Producer David Tyson was again nominated for the Juno Award for "Producer of the Year", for his work on this album.

The album title is a line from the last song titled "Hampton Avenue". Overall, the album has a more serious tone than the previous one and musically it features a number of tracks with a horn section. This would be the last album from The Arrows - lead vocalist and songwriter Dean McTaggart would go on to write hit songs for other artists including Amanda Marshall.

== Track listing ==
1. "Heart of the City" (McTaggart/Mosby)
2. "Talk Talk" (McTaggart/Tyson)
3. "Bad Reputation" (McTaggart/Tyson)
4. "Tell It to My Heart" (McTaggart)
5. "Wild One" (McTaggart)
6. "I Told You So" (McTaggart/Tyson)
7. "Chains" (McTaggart/Tyson)
8. "I Can't Let Go" (McTaggart/Gusevs/Tyson)
9. "Hampton Avenue" (McTaggart/Tyson)

== Singles ==
The following Canadian singles were released from the album:

- "Talk Talk" (#47, December 1985)
- "Heart of the City" (#57, March 1986)
- "Chains" (#93, May 1986)

== Album credits ==
=== Personnel ===
- Dean McTaggart - vocals, background vocals
- Doug Macaskill - guitars
- Rob Gusevs - keyboards
- Earl Seymour - saxophones, steiner woodwind synthesizer
- Bobby Economou - drums
- Glenn Olive - bass guitar
- Rick Waychenko - trumpet
- Steve McDade - trumpet
- Vernon Dorge - alto saxophone
- Memo Acevedo - percussion
- Gerald O'Brien - emulator programming
- Sharon Lee Williams - background vocals
- Charity Brown - background vocals
- John Rutledge - background vocals
- David Blamires - background vocals
- David Tyson - background vocals
- Paul Shubat - assistant engineer

=== Production ===
- David Tyson - producer, arrangement
- The Arrows - arrangement
- Lindsay Kidd - engineer
- Bob Rock - mixing engineer, at Little Mountain Sound, Vancouver
- Larry Alexander - mixing engineer on "Talk Talk", at Power Station, New York City
- David Moore - executive producer
- Hugh Syme and Dimo Safari - art direction and photography
