= These Walls =

These Walls may refer to:

- "These Walls" (Dream Theater song), a 2005 song by Dream Theater
- "These Walls" (Teddy Geiger song), a 2006 song by Teddy Geiger
- "These Walls" (Kendrick Lamar song), a 2015 song by Kendrick Lamar
- "These Walls" (Dua Lipa song), a 2024 song by Dua Lipa
- "These Walls", a 2002 song by Trapt from the album Trapt (album)
