= Dark Horse (Amanda Marshall song) =

1997 single by Amanda Marshall

Single by Amanda Marshall

from the album Amanda Marshall
- Released: 1997
- Genre: Pop rock
- Length: 5:37
- Label: Epic
- Songwriters: Amanda Marshall; David Tyson; Dean McTaggart
- Producer: David Tyson

Amanda Marshall singles chronology
"Beautiful Goodbye" (1996)	"Dark Horse" (1997)	"Sitting On Top of the World" (1997)

"Dark Horse" is a song by Canadian pop singer Amanda Marshall. Co-written by Dean McTaggart and David Tyson, it was the fifth single released from Marshall's 1995 self-titled debut album and became another hit for her in Canada, reaching number five on the RPM 100 Hit Tracks chart and peaking atop the RPM Adult Contemporary Tracks chart. It also became a minor hit in Australia and Germany. In 1997, American country music singer Mila Mason covered the song for her own debut album, That's Enough of That. Her version reached number 21 on the US Billboard Hot Country Singles & Tracks chart and number 12 on the Canadian RPM 100 Country Tracks chart.

== Critical reception ==
Colin Larkin, in The Encyclopedia of Popular Music, wrote that it was "more personal" than the other story songs on Marshall's album. Jeremy Helligar of Entertainment Weekly said that Marshall "drums up momentum with the gently percussive 'Dark Horse'". Elton John remarked on The Rosie O'Donnell Show that "Dark Horse" was a "guaranteed hit" after he mentioned that he was listening to Amanda Marshall's album.

== Chart performance ==
On Canada's RPM 100 Hit Tracks chart, "Dark Horse" debuted at number 74 on January 13, 1997, and peaked at number five nine weeks later, on the issue of March 17, 1997. The single also peaked at number one on the same publication's Adult Contemporary Tracks chart two weeks later. It was the 27th-most successful song of 1997 in Canada and the third-most successful adult contemporary hit of the year in the country. The song also charted within the lower reaches on the charts of Australia and Germany, making it to numbers 70 and 93 respectively. Despite its low peak on the German chart, it stayed in the top 100 for six nonconsecutive weeks.

== Track listings ==
UK CD single

1. "Dark Horse" (edit)
2. "Let It Rain" (live)
3. "Birmingham" (live)
4. "This Could Take All Night"

European maxi-CD single

1. "Dark Horse" (edit) – 4:29
2. "Let It Rain" (live) – 6:12
3. "Birmingham" (live) – 7:46

== Charts ==
=== Weekly charts ===
Chart (1997)	Peak position
Australia (ARIA)	70
Canada Top Singles (RPM)	5
Canada Adult Contemporary (RPM)	1
Germany (GfK)	93

=== Year-end charts ===
Chart (1997)	Position
Canada Top Singles (RPM)	27
Canada Adult Contemporary (RPM)	3

== Mila Mason version ==
"Dark Horse"

Single by Mila Mason

from the album That's Enough of That
- B-side: "I Do"
- Released: February 1997
- Genre: Country
- Length: 4:59
- Label: Atlantic
- Songwriters: Amanda Marshall; David Tyson; Dean McTaggart
- Producer: Blake Mevis

Mila Mason singles chronology
"That's Enough of That" (1996)	"Dark Horse" (1997)	"That's the Kinda Love (That I'm Talkin' About)" (1997)

Mila Mason's version appears on her 1996 debut album, That's Enough of That. It was the second single from the album, entering the charts in February 1997.

=== Critical reception ===
Brian Wahlert of Country Standard Time described Mason's cover as "the least country song on the album" but said that "Mason's smoky voice works perfectly on the opening lyric […] and the pretty ensuing story of young love that lasted."

=== Chart performance ===
Mason's version of the song spent 20 weeks on the Billboard Hot Country Singles & Tracks chart, peaking at number 21. In Canada, it reached number 12 on the RPM 100 Country Tracks chart on May 12, 1997.

==== Weekly charts ====
Chart (1997)	Peak position
Canada Country Singles (RPM)	12
US Hot Country Singles & Tracks (Billboard)	21

==== Year-end charts ====
Chart (1997)	Position
Canada Country Tracks (RPM)	86
