= Everybody's Got a Story =

Studio album by Amanda Marshall
- Released: November 13, 2001
- Recorded: 2000–2001
- Genre: Pop
- Length: 52:06
- Label: Sony Music/Epic
- Producers: Billy Mann, Peter Asher

Amanda Marshall chronology
| Tuesday's Child (1999) | Everybody's Got a Story (2001) | Intermission: The Singles Collection (2003) |

Professional ratings
Review scores
| Source | Rating |
|---|---|
| Allmusic | link |
| Entertainment Weekly | A- |

Everybody's Got a Story is Amanda Marshall's third studio album. The album was certified platinum by the CRIA selling over 100,000 copies across Canada. It was her last new studio album of original material until the release of Heavy Lifting in 2023.

== Track listing ==
1. "Everybody's Got a Story" (Amanda Marshall, Billy Mann, Marvin Leonard (Molecules)) - 4:11
2. "The Voice Inside" (Marshall, Mann, Peter Asher, Molecules) - 3:01
3. "The Gypsy" (Marshall, Mann, Molecules) - 4:30
4. "Colleen (I Saw Him First)" (Marshall, Mann, Molecules) - 5:10
5. "Double Agent" (Marshall, Mann, Asher, Molecules) - 4:41
6. "Red Magic Marker" (Marshall, Mann, Asher, Molecules) - 3:26
7. "Sunday Morning After" (Marshall, Mann, Asher, Molecules) - 4:44
8. "Love Is My Witness" (Marshall, Mann) - 3:21
9. "Dizzy" (Marshall, Mann, Molecules) - 4:02
10. "Brand New Beau" (Marshall, Mann, Asher, Molecules) - 4:24
11. "Marry Me" (Marshall, Rob Misener) - 3:51
12. "Inside the Tornado" (Marshall, Mann) - 1:43

== Personnel ==
- Amanda Marshall - Vocals, Background Vocals
- Billy Mann - Acoustic & Electric Guitars, Keyboards, Background Vocal Arrangements, Background Vocals
- Molecules - Drum and Percussion Programming
- Peter Asher - Baritone Electric Guitar, Background Vocals
- Steven Wolf - Live Drums and Additional Programming
- Jack Daley - Bass
- Paul Pimsler - Electric Guitars
- Sandy Park - Concertmaster, Contractor, Solo Violin
- David Campbell - Orchestral Arrangements and Conducting
- Jon Clarke - Woodwinds
- Tim Hagans - Additional Keyboards

== Year-end charts ==
Year-end chart performance for Everybody's Got a Story
| Chart (2001) | Position |
|---|---|
| Canadian Albums (Nielsen SoundScan) | 116 |

| Chart (2002) | Position |
|---|---|
| Canadian Albums (Nielsen SoundScan) | 79 |
