= Closer to Heaven (song) =

Single by Mila Mason

from the album The Strong One
- B-side: "Bossa' My Heart"
- Released: November 29, 1997
- Genre: Country
- Length: 4:19
- Label: Atlantic
- Songwriter(s): Aimee Mayo, Bill Luther
- Producer(s): Blake Mevis

Mila Mason singles chronology
"That's the Kinda Love (That I'm Talkin' About" (1997)	"Closer to Heaven" (1997)	"The Strong One" (1998)

"Closer to Heaven" is a song recorded by American country music artist Mila Mason. It was released in November 1997 as the first single from the album The Strong One. The song reached #31 on the Billboard Hot Country Singles & Tracks chart. The song was written by Aimee Mayo and Bill Luther.

== Chart performance ==
Chart (1997–1998)	Peak position
US Hot Country Songs (Billboard)	31
Canadian RPM Country Tracks	45
