= That's Enough of That (song) =

Single by Mila Mason

from the album That's Enough of That
- B-side: "Heart Without a Past"
- Released: August 17, 1996
- Genre: Country
- Length: 2:45
- Label: Atlantic
- Songwriters: Randy Albright, Lisa Silver, Mark D. Sanders
- Producer: Blake Mevis

Mila Mason singles chronology
"That's Enough of That" (1996)	"Dark Horse" (1996)

"That's Enough of That" is a debut song written by Randy Albright, Lisa Silver and Mark D. Sanders, and recorded by American country music artist Mila Mason. It was released in August 1996 as the first single and title track from the album That's Enough of That. The song reached #18 on the Billboard Hot Country Singles & Tracks chart.

== Chart performance ==
Chart (1996)	Peak position
Canada Country Singles (RPM)	34
US Hot Country Songs (Billboard)	18
