= Mila Mason =

American singer-songwriter (born 1963)

- Born: August 22, 1963 (age 62)
- Origin: Dawson Springs, Kentucky, United States
- Genres: Country
- Occupation: Singer-songwriter
- Instrument: Vocals
- Years active: 1996–2015
- Labels: Atlantic, Twinbeat, Plateau Music Nashville

Mila Mason (born August 22, 1963) is an American country music artist. She made her debut in 1996 with her debut album That's Enough of That, which produced three hit singles on the Billboard Hot Country Singles & Tracks (now Country Airplay) charts, including its title track. It was followed by 1998's The Strong One, from which two more singles were released. Mason did not record another album until 2003's Stained Glass Window, on the independent Twinbeat label.

== Biography ==
Mila Mason was born August 22, 1963, in Dawson Springs, Kentucky. Her mother, Diane, was a singer who performed in Las Vegas and toured Europe. When Mason was 17, she and her mother moved to Nashville, Tennessee, and it was there that Mason decided to pursue a career in songwriting. She took up a job as a demo singer before being discovered by record producer Blake Mevis in 1993. Mevis sent some of Mason's material to Bryan Switzer, then the vice president of Atlantic Records.

=== Music career ===
In 1996, Mason was signed to Atlantic Records, and her debut single "That's Enough of That" reached the Top 20 on the Billboard Hot Country Songs charts. An album of the same name followed, producing two more singles: a No. 21-peaking song of Canadian singer-songwriter Amanda Marshall's "Dark Horse", followed by "That's the Kinda Love (That I'm Talking About)" at No. 59.

Mason released her second album, The Strong One, in 1998. It produced a No. 31 in lead-off single "Closer to Heaven" and the title track at No. 57, while "This Heart" failed to chart. Dissatisfied with the direction her career had taken, she left Atlantic in 1998 and took time off to work on her songwriting. She co-wrote Mindy McCready's 2002 single "Maybe, Maybe Not".

In 2003 Mason signed to the independent Twinbeat Records label and recorded the album Stained Glass Window, which included her own version of "Maybe, Maybe Not." She also became one of the first songwriters signed to the Nashville division of the Brumley Music Group, an independent country music and gospel music publishing company.

In late 2010, Mason took a break from recording and touring to head up the Faverett Music Group on Music Row, Nashville. Faverett is home to writer/artists Shane Piaseki, Adam Fears, & Dan Schafer. The catalog also has songs by artists including Chris Gantry, Dennis Matkowsky, Josh Osborne, Sheree Spann/Spoltore, Greg Barnhill, Jimmy Olander(Diamond Rio), Jim Collins, Randy Thomas.

Mason released a new single, "Run Like a Girl," produced by Tony Mantor, in February 2015.

== Discography ==
=== Albums ===
Title	Album details	Peak chart positions		
Title	Album details	US Country	US Heat	CAN Country
That's Enough of That	Release date: September 17, 1996; Label: Atlantic Records	43	37	20
The Strong One	Release date: January 20, 1998; Label: Atlantic Records	38	31	—
Stained Glass Window	Release date: September 23, 2003; Label: Twinbeat	—	—	—
"—" denotes releases that did not chart

=== Singles ===
Year	Single	Peak chart positions		Album
Year	Single	US Country	CAN Country	Album
1996	"That's Enough of That"	18	34	That's Enough of That
1997	"Dark Horse"	21	12	That's Enough of That
1997	"That's the Kinda Love (That I'm Talkin' About)"	59	66	That's Enough of That
1997	"Closer to Heaven"	31	45	The Strong One
1998	"The Strong One"	57	30	The Strong One
1998	"This Heart"	—	—	The Strong One
2003	"Maybe, Maybe Not"	—	—	Stained Glass Window
2006	"God Bless the Children" (with Wayne Warner and the Nashville All-Star Choir)	—	—	Turbo Twang'n
2015	"Run Like a Girl"	—	—	—N/a
"—" denotes releases that did not chart

=== Music videos ===
Year	Video	Director
1996	"That's Enough of That"	Jim Shea
1997	"Dark Horse"	Jim Shea
1997	"Closer to Heaven"	David Abbott
1998	"The Strong One"	Bob Garrison
