= Dean McTaggart =

Canadian singer-songwriter and record producer

Robert Dean McTaggart is a Canadian singer-songwriter and record producer. His most recent album is Drop the Needle in the Groove from 2010.

== Biography ==
McTaggart was the lead vocalist in the Canadian band The Arrows from 1981 to 1986. The Arrows produced two albums and one EP and had popular hits in Canada including "Meet Me in the Middle", "Say It Isn't True", "Heart of the City", "Never Be Another One" and "Talk Talk".

Following this, McTaggart spent a lot of time in Nashville, Tennessee as a staff writer. Four of his songs were featured on Amanda Marshall's self-titled debut album Amanda Marshall. Of these, "Dark Horse" and "Birmingham" were notable hits with the latter reaching No. 43 on the Billboard Hot 100 charts in the U.S. in 1996. McTaggart also wrote successful songs for Wynonna Judd, including "Heaven Help My Heart" from her 1996 album Revelations which reached No. 14 on the Billboard Country charts and "Love's Funny That Way" from 1997's The Other Side.

McTaggart has also written songs for Australian singer Tina Arena including her version of "Heaven Help My Heart" from the 1994 album Don't Ask and "Unsung Hero" from 1997's In Deep. "Unsung Hero" was also recorded by Terri Clark for her 1998 album How I Feel and in 1999 this version reached No. 15 on the Canadian Country charts and No. 47 on the Billboard Country charts in the U.S.

In 1998, McTaggart was nominated for the Juno Award for "Songwriter of the Year" for his works recorded by Amanda Marshall, Wynonna Judd and Tina Arena.

== Discography ==
=== The Arrows ===
- 1982 – Misunderstood (EP)
- 1984 – Stand Back
- 1985 – The Lines Are Open
- 1995 – Talk Talk: The Best of The Arrows

=== Solo ===
- 2002 – Full Moon Howl
- 2005 – Shed My Sin
- 2010 – Drop the Needle in the Groove
