= Tuesday's Child (album) =

Studio album by Amanda Marshall
- Released: June 22, 1999
- Recorded: 1998–99
- Genre: Pop
- Length: 61:16
- Label: Sony Music/Epic
- Producer: Don Was

Amanda Marshall chronology
Amanda Marshall (1995)	Tuesday's Child (1999)	Everybody's Got a Story (2001)

Singles from Tuesday's Child
- 1. "Believe In You"; 2. "Love Lift Me" Released: July 21, 1999; 3. "If I Didn't Have You"; 4. "Shades Of Grey"; 5. "Why Don't You Love Me"

Professional ratings
Review scores
Source	Rating
Allmusic	3/5 stars

Tuesday's Child is Canadian singer-songwriter Amanda Marshall's second album, released in 1999. The album was certified triple platinum by the CRIA selling over 300,000 copies across Canada. The singles off her second album include, "Believe In You", "Love Lift Me", "If I Didn't Have You", "Shades of Grey", and "Why Don't You Love Me". This album produced two top 10 hits in Canada.

== Track listing ==
1. "Believe In You" (Amanda Marshall, Eric Bazilian) 4.31
2. "Love Lift Me" (Marshall, Bazilian, Randy Cantor, John Bettis) 3.47
3. "Why Don't You Love Me?" (Marshall, Bazilian, Desmond Child) 4.12
4. "Too Little, Too Late" (Marshall, Bazilian) 4.36
5. "If I Didn't Have You" (Marshall, Bazilian) 5.33
6. "Ride" (Marshall, Bazilian, Child) 4.27
7. "Right Here All Along" (Marshall, Carole King) 5.14
8. "Wishful Thinking" (Maia Sharp, Cantor) 4.40
9. "Shades of Grey" (Marshall, Bazilian) 5.03
10. "Give Up Giving In" (Marshall, Bazilian) 4.47
11. "Best of Me" (Marshall, Bazilian) 4.26
12. "Never Said Goodbye" (Marshall, Bazilian) 6.24
13. "Out of Bounds" (Marshall, Marti Frederiksen) 3.53
14. "Just Love Me" (Japan bonus track)

== Personnel ==
- Amanda Marshall – vocals, piano, electric piano, Wurlitzer piano, Fender Rhodes, keyboards, percussion
- Eric Bazilian – guitar, bass guitar, mandolin, piano, keyboards, omnichord, background vocals
- Andy Kravitz – drums, percussion, omnichord
- Gota Yashiki – drum loops
- Jamie Muhoberac – acoustic piano, keyboards
- Richie Sambora – electric guitar
- Mark Goldenberg – electric guitar
- Dean Parks – acoustic guitar, mandolin
- Rob Misener – bass guitar
- Steve Jordan – drums
- Benmont Tench – Hammond B3 organ
- Paulinho Da Costa – percussion
- Carole King – keyboards, background vocals
- Paul Jackson Jr. – electric guitar
- Matt Rollings – piano
- John O'Brien – programming
- Kenny Aronoff – drums
- Waddy Wachtel – electric & acoustic guitar
- Joe Sublett – horns
- Darrell Leonard – horns
- Roger Manning – background vocals
- Mark Isham – trumpet
- David Campbell – arranger

== Charts ==
=== Weekly charts ===
Chart (1999)	Peak position
Australian Albums (ARIA)	84
Austrian Albums (Ö3 Austria)	25
Canadian Albums (RPM)	4
Dutch Albums (Album Top 100)	62
German Albums (Offizielle Top 100)	18
Swiss Albums (Schweizer Hitparade)	19
US Heatseekers Albums (Billboard)	30

=== Year-end charts ===
Chart (1999)	Position
German Albums (Offizielle Top 100)	92

Chart (2000)	Position
Canadian Albums (Nielsen SoundScan)	143

== Certifications ==
Region	Certification	Certified units/sales
Canada (Music Canada)	3× Platinum	300,000^{^}
^{^} Shipments figures based on certification alone.
