= Stand Back (The Arrows album) =

Studio album by The Arrows
- Released: 1984
- Studios: Sounds Interchange, Toronto, Ontario, Canada
- Genre: Pop/Rock
- Label: A&M
- Producer: David Tyson

The Arrows chronology
The Arrows (EP) (1982)	Stand Back (1984)	The Lines Are Open (1985)

Professional ratings
Review scores
Source	Rating
Allmusic	not rated, no review link

Stand Back is the first proper album by The Arrows released in 1984, that featured three hit Canadian singles. Producer David Tyson was nominated for a Juno Award in 1984 for "Producer of the Year", for his work on this album.

== Track listing ==
1. "Meet Me in the Middle" (Dean McTaggart, David Tyson) - 4:09
2. "Say It Isn't True" (McTaggart, Tyson) - 4:10
3. "Fallen Angel" - (McTaggart) - 5:40
4. "Never Be Another One" (McTaggart, Tyson, Doug Macaskill) - 4:07
5. "Girl in 313" (McTaggart, Tyson) - 4:38
6. "Stand Back" (McTaggart, Tyson) - 4:26
7. "Enough is Never Enough" (McTaggart, Tyson) - 4:10
8. "I Owe You" (McTaggart, Tyson) - 5:24
9. "Easy Street" (McTaggart, Tyson) - 5:09

== Singles ==
The following Canadian singles were released from the album:

- "Meet Me in the Middle" (#30, July 1984)
- "Say It Isn't True"
- "Never Be Another One"
- "Easy Street"

== Album credits ==
=== Personnel ===
- Dean McTaggart - vocals, background vocals
- Doug Macaskill - guitars
- Rob Gusevs - keyboards
- Earl Seymour - tenor saxophone, bass clarinet
- Peter Bleakney - bass
- Howard Aye - bass
- Michael Sloski - drums
- Gary Craig - drums
- Matt Zimbel - percussion
- Eddie Schwartz - background vocals
- Al Van Wart - background vocals
- David Tyson - keyboards, background vocals

=== Production ===
- David Tyson - producer, arrangement
- The Arrows - arrangement
- Kevin Doyle - Recording Engineer
- Vic Pyle - Assistant Engineer
- Scott Litt - mixing engineer
- David Moore - executive producer
- Howie Weinberg - mastering at Masterdisc, New York
- Dean Motter - art direction and graphics
- Patrick Harbron - photography
- Paul Shubat - assistant engineer
