= The Strong One =

Studio album by Mila Mason
- Released: January 20, 1998
- Genre: Country
- Length: 36:43
- Label: Atlantic
- Producer: Blake Mevis

Mila Mason chronology
That's Enough of That (1996)	The Strong One (1998)	Stained Glass Window (2003)

Professional ratings
Review scores
Source	Rating
AllMusic	4/5 stars

The Strong One is the second studio album by the American country music artist Mila Mason, released in 1998 on Atlantic Records. Like her debut album, it was produced by Blake Mevis.

Her second and final album for the label, it produced two minor chart hits on both the Billboard Hot Country Singles & Tracks (now Hot Country Songs) charts and the Canadian RPM Top Country Tracks charts. The first, "Closer to Heaven", was a #31 in the US and #45 in Canada, while "The Strong One" was a #57 in the US and a #30 in Canada. The third single, "This Heart", failed to chart in either country, and by the end of 1998, Mason had exited Atlantic.

== Track listing ==
No.	Title	Writer(s)	Length
1.	"This Heart"	Al Anderson, Robert Ellis Orrall	3:53
2.	"Closer to Heaven"	Bill Luther, Aimee Mayo	4:19
3.	"The Strong One"	Byron Hill, Cyril Rawson	3:39
4.	"Don't Maybe Me"	Kimberlye Gold, Holly Lamar	3:02
5.	"Let Me Cry"	Buffy Lawson, Tony Marty	4:18
6.	"Bossa' My Heart"	Chapin Hartford	3:15
7.	"One Thing Led to Another"	Don Pfrimmer, Lindy Gravelle	3:17
8.	"You and Only You"	Kostas, Wally Wilson	3:24
9.	"10 Lb. Heart"	Nick Pellegrino, Kenya Walker	4:00
10.	"Blood Simple"	Susan Longacre, Rick Giles	3:36

== Personnel ==
- Mark Casstevens – acoustic guitar
- Glen Duncan – fiddle
- Sonny Garrish – pedal steel guitar
- John Hobbs – piano
- David James – background vocals
- Carl Marsh – strings
- Brent Mason – electric guitar
- Jonell Mosser – background vocals
- Chris Rodriguez – background vocals
- Nan Sumrall – background vocals
- Lonnie Wilson – drums
- Glenn Worf – bass guitar

== Chart performance ==
Chart (1998)	Peak position
U.S. Billboard Top Country Albums	38
U.S. Billboard Top Heatseekers	31
