= Billy Mann =

American music producer and songwriter (born 1968)

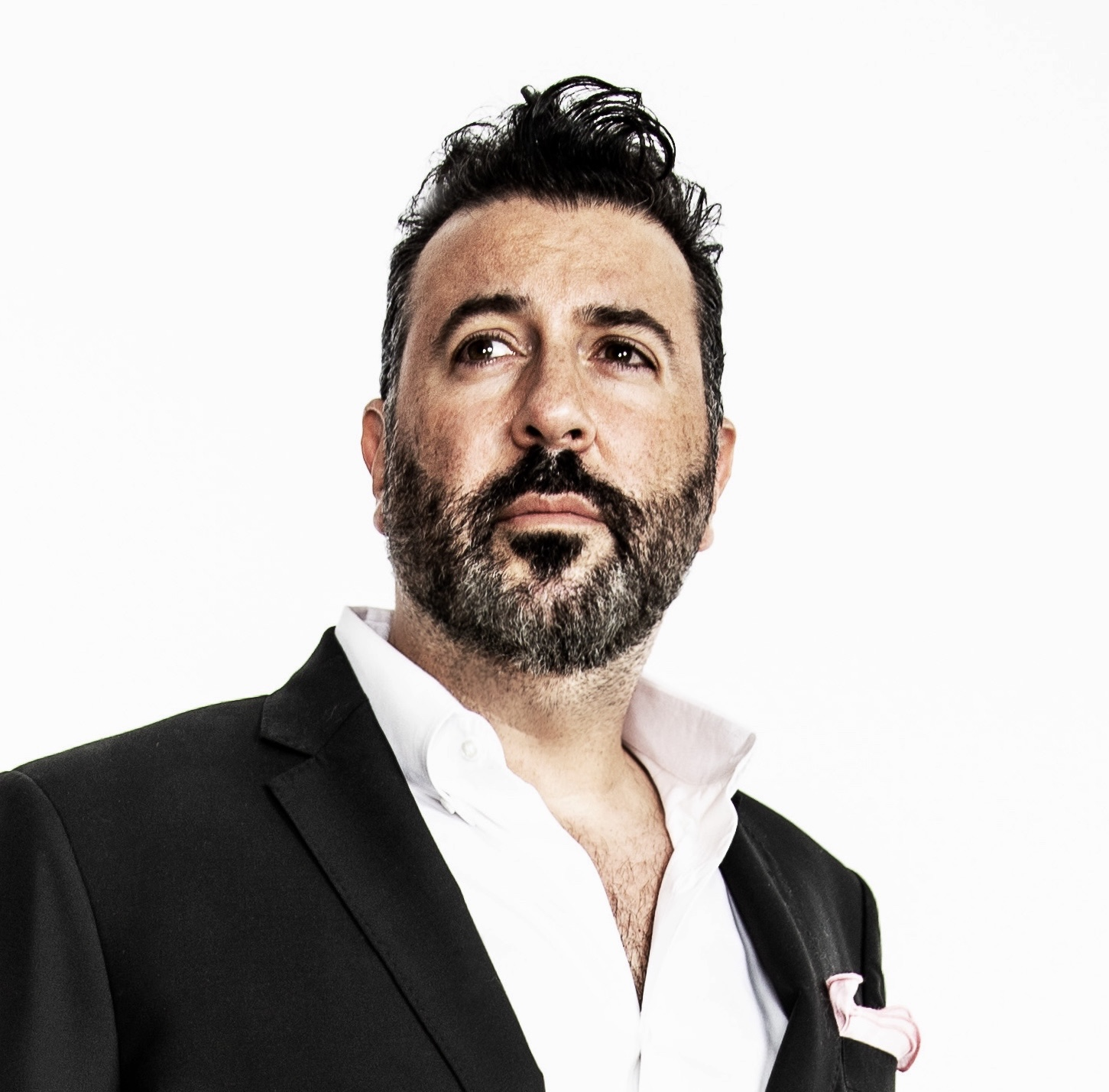
- Mann in 2021

Background information
- Born: William Isaiah Erlichman; December 20, 1968 (age 57); Philadelphia, Pennsylvania, U.S.
- Genres: Pop, rock, dance, urban, country, world
- Occupations: Record producer; songwriter; music publisher
- Years active: 1989-present
- Labels: EMI; BMG; A&M; icons+giants; PolyGram

William Hort-Mann (né Isaiah Erlichman; born December 20, 1968) is an American record producer and songwriter. He is known for producing "3 Is Family" by Dana Dawson in 1995 as well as Billboard Hot 100 top 40 hits such as "For You I Will (Confidence)" by Teddy Geiger, "Stupid Girls" and "Glitter in the Air" by P!nk, and "With You" by Jessica Simpson. He has co-produced or written albums for Backstreet Boys, Delta Goodrem, Kelly Rowland, Diana King, Ricki-Lee Coulter, Lauren Bennett, and Celine Dion, among others.

He founded the music publishing company Green & Bloom/Topline in 2011, and the management firm Manncom in 2012. In 2021, Mann co-founded Proof of Concept, a talent development and creative media services firm, and icons+giants, a record label in partnership with Alternative Distribution Alliance, both with Benton James.

== Early life and education ==
Mann was born in Philadelphia, Pennsylvania, as the youngest of three children. He lived with his mother in Philadelphia’s inner city after his parents' divorce. In early childhood, he began experimenting with songwriting, guitar, piano, bass, harmonica, baritone horn, and flute. By age 12, he had formed bands with other young local musicians, including Steven Wolf, Clayton Sears and Adam Dorn (a.k.a. Mocean Worker).

Mann attended the Philadelphia High School for the Creative & Performing Arts (CAPA) for Vocal Music, and received his diploma in three years. In 1989, he received his Bachelor’s degree from Hampshire College in Amherst, Massachusetts.

== Career ==
=== Artist ===
Mann began his professional career by living in a car for two years as a traveling musician. After stops in Los Angeles, San Francisco, Miami and London, he landed in New York, and met producer Ric Wake, facilitated by songwriter/performer Gregg Wattenberg, led to Mann being signed to Wake for publishing, to Wake’s production company, and to Wake’s imprint DV8 Records, distributed by A&M.

This led to two solo releases: 1996’s Billy Mann and 1998’s Earthbound. Earthbound, co-produced by Mann and David Kershenbaum, featured co-writers with an appearance by Carole King.

=== Songwriter ===
Mann has written songs for artists across genres including pop, rock, dance, R&B, reggae, house, and country. He has publishing credits with Sony/ATV, Warner/Chappell, Verse and BMG Chrysalis. His songwriting collaborators have included Carole King, Rudy Perez, Burt Bacharach, Desmond Child, Graham Lyle and Walter Afanasieff, and Christian Medice, David Spencer and Supah Mario.

Mann has a long-standing collaboration with P!nk, to whom he was introduced in 2002 by her co-manager Craig Logan. They have co-written songs including "God Is a DJ", "Stupid Girls", "Dear Mr. President", "Nobody Knows", "I’m Not Dead", "Crystal Ball", "Glitter in the Air", "Bridge of Light", "The Truth About Love" and "Beam Me Up". They have been nominated for Grammy Awards for "Stupid Girls" and "The Truth About Love". In 2017, Mann co-wrote and produced "I Am Here" on P!nk's album Beautiful Trauma. Variety profiled their partnership after the album's release. P!nk and Mann continued their collaboration in 2019 on Hurts 2B Human with "The Last Song Of Your Life."

=== Record producer ===
About.com named Mann one of the Top 10 Producers of 2006. He has also worked with Peter Asher, Walter Afanasieff, David Foster and James Stroud.

==== Production and writing credits include ====
- P!nk: Try This, I'm Not Dead, Funhouse, Greatest Hits... So Far!!!, The Truth About Love, Beautiful Trauma, Hurts 2B Human, All I Know So Far
- Cher: Closer to the Truth
- Celine Dion: Let’s Talk About Love
- Josh Groban: Closer
- Backstreet Boys: Never Gone, Unbreakable
- Michael Bolton: Only a Woman Like You
- Teddy Geiger: Step Ladder, Underage Thinking, Snow Blankets the Night
- Ricky Martin: Life
- Martina McBride: Emotions
- Robyn: My Truth
- Kelly Rowland: Simply Deep, Ms. Kelly
- Jonas Bros: It’s About Time
- Hall & Oates: Do It for Love
- Jessica Simpson: Irresistible, In This Skin
- Joss Stone: Introducing Joss Stone
- Take That: Beautiful World
- Paul van Dyk: Out There and Back
- Amanda Marshall: Everybody’s Got a Story
- Seeed: Seeed
- Frida Gold: Liebe Ist Meine Religion
- Natalie Imbruglia: Male
- Jennifer Brown: Vera
- Grover Washington Jr., Soulful Strut
- Boyzone, A Different Beat
- Helene Fischer, Helene Fischer
- Draco Rosa, Mad Love
- Jacob Whitesides, A Piece Of Me, Faces On Film, Why?
- Art Garfunkel, Everything Waits To Be Noticed
- Brian Litrell, Welcome Home You
- Oh Honey, Sincerely Yours
- John Legend, Love In The Future
- Tiziano Ferro, El Amor Es Una Cosa Simple, Breathe Gentle
- Dixie D’Amelio, Be Happy
- Alex Aiono, Unloving You, The Gospel At 23
- Delta Goodrem Mistaken Identity (Delta Goodrem album), Last Night On Earth, Title Track
- Tarkan Come Closer

=== Show Producer ===
In the summer of 2021, Mann collaborated with Benton James, Clay Pecorin, Russell Geyser, Jason Halio, and Zak Tanjeloff to create Song House Live, a reality show featuring musical influencers/social media creators creating content and recording music to win a record deal with Capitol Music Group. The experience was live streamed. Tyler Brash won. Mann is also a Consulting Producer of The D'Amelio Show (HULU, September 2021).

=== Podcast ===
During the COVID-19 pandemic, Mann created a podcast about failure featuring successful artists and celebrities. On April 26, 2022, Warner Music Group announced Mann's podcast, launching on their Interval Presents network.

His podcast "Yeah, I F*cked That Up" launched July 11, 2023, with guests including Kelly Rowland, Steven Van Zandt, and Renée Elise Goldsberry.

=== Entrepreneur ===
In 2001, Mann founded Stealth Entertainment in New York City's garment district. Stealth developed artists, songwriters, producers and mixing engineers including Andy Zulla, Christopher Rojas, Teddy Geiger, Esmee Denters, and Pete Wallace. Mann is known for discovering Emma Stone, Teddy Geiger, Jacob Whitesides, Charli D'Amelio and Dixie D'Amelio.

Stealth partnered with Seventeen Magazine, Columbia Records, SonyBMG Special Projects, Target, Levi's and other brands. Stealth was acquired by EMI.

Mann has consulted for Zomba Group, Sony Music Entertainment, Sony Pictures Television, Warner-Chappell, Red Bull Media House, BMG Chrysalis, Bliss Legal and BMG International. He has appeared on The Today Show.

He advises Scenebot Stage and is on the investor board of Angel Ventures, Mexico.

=== Executive ===
In November 2007, Mann joined EMI Music as creative advisor and operating board member. He became chief creative officer.

His time at EMI included developing artists and partnerships, including David Guetta, Pablo Alboran, Helene Fischer, Bebe, Juan Luis Guerra, Tiziano Ferro, Robyn, Panda, Paty Cantu, Belinda, Wind Up and Movic. He also developed artist management initiatives in Spain, Germany, Italy and the United States. He served as non-executive chairman for Stealth Entertainment.

Mann worked under four CEOs at EMI in three years. EMI CEO Roger Faxon announced Mann’s departure.

In January 2011, Mann became president of creative, BMG North America.

In late 2011, Mann founded Manncom Creative Partners and Green & Bloom/Topline (with BMG). BMG later extended its investment in Green & Bloom. By 2019, Green & Bloom/Topline had success with lovelytheband, Supah Mario, Flawless, and Dani Poppitt.
