= These Walls (Teddy Geiger song) =

- Cover from her MySpace

Single by Teddy Geiger

from the album Underage Thinking
- Released: September 2006
- Recorded: 2005–2006
- Genre: Pop rock
- Length: 3:43
- Label: Columbia
- Songwriters: Teddy Geiger, Beth Cohen, Peter Wallace
- Producer: Billy Mann

Teddy Geiger singles chronology
"For You I Will (Confidence)" (2006)	"These Walls" (2006)

"These Walls" is the second single by the American singer-songwriter Teddy Geiger, released in September 2006. The song was used by the Seven Network in Australia to promote the show Prison Break.

== Official versions ==
- "These Walls" (Album Version) - 3:43

== Music video ==
In the video for the song, Geiger puts on earphones attached to her iPod Shuffle, plays a piano in a house, throws playing cards into a fedora hat, and starts singing. Water comes out of nowhere and the walls of the house come down. She is seen on a field with holding hands with a girl.

== Chart performance ==
Chart (2006)	Peak position
Australian ARIA Singles Chart	50
US Adult Pop Airplay (Billboard)	32
US Pop Airplay (Billboard)	34

== Release history ==
Release dates and formats for "These Walls"
Region	Date	Format	Label(s)	Ref.
United States	11 July 2006	Mainstream airplay	Columbia	
