= Amanda Marshall (album) =

Studio album by Amanda Marshall
- Released: October 17, 1995
- Genres: Pop, soft rock, neo-soul
- Length: 49:30
- Label: Sony Music/Epic
- Producer: David Tyson

Amanda Marshall chronology
Amanda Marshall (1995)	Tuesday's Child (1999)

Singles from Amanda Marshall
- 1. "Let It Rain" Released: September 25, 1995; 2. "Birmingham" Released: 1995; 3. "Fall From Grace" Released: 1996; 4. "Beautiful Goodbye" Released: 1996; 5. "Dark Horse" Released: 1997; 6. "Sitting on Top of the World" Released: 1997; 7. "Trust Me (This is Love)" Released: 1997

Professional ratings
Review scores
Source	Rating
AllMusic	4.5/5 stars
Cash Box	(favorable)
Entertainment Weekly	C

Amanda Marshall is the 1995 debut album by Canadian singer Amanda Marshall. The album peaked at number four on the RPM Albums Chart and has also been certified Diamond by the CRIA with over 1,000,000 copies sold in Canada, making it Marshall's best-selling album of her career. In the United States, the album charted at number 156 on the Billboard 200 and sold over 350,000 copies. It was particularly successful in Norway, where it reached number one and received a Platinum certification. The album sold 2 million copies worldwide.

Seven songs from the album were released as singles: "Let It Rain", "Birmingham","Fall From Grace", "Beautiful Goodbye", "Dark Horse", "Sitting on Top of the World", and "Trust Me (This Is Love)". "Birmingham" is Marshall's highest-charting song in Canada, peaking at number three. "Fall from Grace", "Dark Horse", and "Sitting on Top of the World" all reached the top five. "Let It Rain" is her most successful international hit, reaching number three in Norway and the top 30 in Australia and New Zealand; it was certified Gold in Norway.

== Track listing ==
1. "Let It Rain" (Kristen Hall) – 4:33
2. "Birmingham" (Dean McTaggart, David Tyson, Gerald O'Brien) – 5:21
3. "Fall From Grace" (Marc Jordan, Kim Bullard) – 4:20
4. "Dark Horse" (Amanda Marshall, David Tyson, Dean McTaggart) – 5:37
5. "Beautiful Goodbye" (David Tyson, Christopher Ward) – 5:17
6. "Sitting on Top of the World" (Amanda Marshall) – 4:19
7. "Last Exit to Eden" (Dean McTaggart, David Tyson) – 5:24
8. "Trust Me (This is Love)" (Dean McTaggart, David Tyson) – 4:59
9. "Let's Get Lost" (Amanda Marshall, Christopher Ward) – 4:14
10. "Promises" (John Capek, Marc Jordan) – 5:22

=== 2023 Deluxe Remastered Edition bonus tracks ===
11. "Don't Let It Bring You Down" (Neil Young) – 3:35
12. "This Could Take All Night" (Linda Thompson, Steve Dorff) – 3:09
13. "Birmingham (Live Acoustic)" (Dean McTaggart, David Tyson, Gerald O'Brien) – 4:33

== Personnel ==
- Amanda Marshall – vocals, background vocals
- Kenny Aronoff – drums, percussion
- Leland Sklar – bass guitar
- Tommy Byrnes – electric guitars
- David Wipper – acoustic guitars, mandolin
- Tim Pierce – additional acoustic guitar & electric guitars
- Bob Mann – acoustic guitar
- Diana DeWitt – background vocals
- David Tyson – background vocals, keyboards, programming
- Tom "T-Bone" Wolk – accordion
- Peter Kent – violin
- Erica Duke-Kirkpatrick – cello
- Louis Taylor – soprano saxophone

== Charts ==
=== Weekly charts ===
Chart (1995–1997)	Peak position
Australian Albums (ARIA)	15
Austrian Albums (Ö3 Austria)	41
Canada Top Albums/CDs (RPM)	4
Dutch Albums (Album Top 100)	14
German Albums (Offizielle Top 100)	36
New Zealand Albums (RMNZ)	17
Norwegian Albums (VG-lista)	1
Scottish Albums (Official Charts)	78
Swedish Albums (Sverigetopplistan)	25
Swiss Albums (Schweizer Hitparade)	42
UK Albums (Official Charts)	47
US Billboard 200	156

=== Year-end charts ===
Chart (1996)	Position
Dutch Albums (Album Top 100)	75
Norwegian Albums (VG-lista)	14
Chart (1997)	Position
Australian Albums (ARIA)	82
Canadian Albums (SoundScan)	17
Chart (1998)	Position
Canadian Albums (SoundScan)	118

== Certifications ==
Region	Certification	Certified units/sales
Australia (ARIA)	Gold	35,000^{^}
Canada (Music Canada)	Diamond	1,000,000^{^}
Netherlands (NVPI)	Gold	50,000^{^}
Norway (IFPI Norway)	Platinum	50,000^{*}
^{*} Sales figures based on certification alone.^{^} Shipments figures based on certification alone.
