= Let It Rain (Amanda Marshall song) =

1995 single by Amanda Marshall

Single by Amanda Marshall

from the album Amanda Marshall
- B-side: "Sitting on Top of the World"
- Released: 1995
- Genre: Soft rock
- Length: 4:31
- Label: Columbia (Canada); Epic (worldwide)
- Songwriter: Kristen Hall
- Producer: David Tyson

Amanda Marshall singles chronology
"Let It Rain" (1995)	"Birmingham" (1996)

Music video
- "Let It Rain" on YouTube

"Let It Rain" is a song by Canadian pop-rock singer Amanda Marshall from her eponymous debut album (1995). The song was written by American folk rock singer-songwriter Kristen Hall, one of the founding members of Sugarland, and produced by David Tyson. Hall originally recorded the song for her 1994 album, Be Careful What You Wish For.

In Canada, Marshall's version of "Let It Rain" was released in 1995 through Columbia Records as Marshall's debut single. It became a top-10 hit in the latter half of the year, peaking at number seven on the RPM 100 Hit Tracks chart. It was then released worldwide through Epic Records in 1996, becoming a number-three hit in Norway and reaching the top 30 in Australia and New Zealand. It remains Marshall's biggest hit outside Canada.

== Composition ==
"Let It Rain" has a duration of four minutes and thirty-one seconds and is written in the key of E major, with a tempo of 74 beats per minutes. It has a time signature of 4/4.

== Critical reception ==
Scottish newspaper Aberdeen Press and Journal commented, "The obviously talented Amanda Marshall may have to get used to the rain, judging by this lacklustre soft rock effort." A reviewer from Music & Media wrote, "With this single, the Canadian singer/songwriter moves out of Joan Osborne territory into the realm of the Melissa Etheridge rock ballad. This slow track has an anthemic chorus with lots of background vocals and Bryan Adams type rock riffs." Music Week rated it three out of five, adding that the singer "almost strays into Sheryl Crow territory" with a "haunting rendition" from her self-titled album.

== Chart performance ==
"Let It Rain" was released in 1995 in Canada by Columbia Records. It first appeared on the RPM 100 Hit Tracks chart at number 99 on the issue dated September 25, 1995, then took eight weeks to reach its peak of number seven on the November 20 issue. It spent 10 more weeks in the top 20, then descended the chart until making its last appearance in the top 100 on the week of March 26, 1996. It spent 27 weeks on the chart altogether. On the RPM Adult Contemporary Tracks chart, the single debuted at number 50 on September 25, 1995, took 11 weeks to peak at number five, then spent an addition weeks six on the chart. It finished 1995 within the top 60 of the 100 Hit Tracks and Adult Contemporary Tracks year-end charts.

Following its success in Canada, "Let It Rain" was released worldwide in 1996 via Epic Records. It first charted in Norway—the country in which it achieved its highest peak—on the 11th chart week of 1996, then climbed to number three on the 19th chart period. Its success was attributed to the parent album, Amanda Marshall, reaching number one on the Norwegian Albums Chart and earning a platinum certification from IFPI Norway. "Let It Rain" spent 16 weeks in the Norwegian top 20 and earned a gold certification from IFPI. In neighbouring Sweden, the song spent a single week on the Swedish Singles Chart, debuting at number 59 on May 24.

In June, "Let It Rain" charted in New Zealand, reaching a peak of number 23 on June 30 and logging eight weeks in the top 50. It then gained popularity in Australia, debuting at number 49 on July 7 and taking four weeks to peak at number 30, eventually totaling 10 weeks in the top 50. In Germany, the single originally charted between July 15 and September 16, peaking at number 73, then reappeared at number 90 on November 18, 2010. In the United Kingdom, "Let It Rain" appeared on the UK Singles Chart for one week, at number 80, on October 5, 1996. It is Marshall's most successful single outside Canada, where "Birmingham" is her most successful single.

== Track listings ==
UK CD1

1. "Let It Rain" (edit) – 3:53
2. "Last Exit to Eden" (live) – 5:11
3. "Beautiful Goodbye" (live) – 5:40

UK CD2

1. "Let It Rain" (album version) – 4:31
2. "This Could Take All Night" – 3:07
3. "Birmingham" (live) – 7:43

UK cassette single

1. "Let It Rain" (edit) – 3:53
2. "Last Exit to Eden" (live) – 5:11

European CD1

1. "Let It Rain" – 4:31
2. "Sitting on Top of the World" – 4:20

European CD2 and Australian CD single

1. "Let It Rain" – 4:31
2. "Sitting on Top of the World" – 4:20
3. "Don't Let It Bring You Down" – 3:35

Japanese CD single

1. "Let It Rain" – 4:32
2. "Fall from Grace" (live version) – 4:52
3. "This Could Take All Night" – 3:09

== Charts ==
=== Weekly charts ===
Chart (1995–1996)	Peak position
Australia (ARIA)	30
Canada Top Singles (RPM)	7
Canada Adult Contemporary (RPM)	5
Germany (GfK)	73
Netherlands (Dutch Top 40 Tipparade)	20
Netherlands (Single Top 100 Tipparade)	8
New Zealand (Recorded Music NZ)	23
Norway (VG-lista)	3
Sweden (Sverigetopplistan)	59
UK Singles (Official Charts)	80

=== Year-end charts ===
Chart (1995)	Position
Canada Top Singles (RPM)	56
Canada Adult Contemporary (RPM)	59

== Certifications ==
Region	Certification
Norway (IFPI Norway)	Gold

== Release history ==
Region	Date	Format(s)	Label(s)	Ref.
Canada	1995	Radio	Columbia	
Japan	September 21, 1996	CD	Epic	
United Kingdom	September 23, 1996	CD; cassette	Epic	
United States	July 1, 1997	Contemporary hit radio	Epic	
