= For You I Will (Confidence) =

2006 single by Teddy Geiger

- CD single cover

Single by Teddy Geiger

from the album Underage Thinking and the EP Step Ladder
- B-side: "Do You Even Care?"
- Released: January 10, 2006
- Recorded: 2005
- Genre: Pop rock
- Length: 3:48
- Label: Columbia
- Songwriters: Teddy Geiger, Billy Mann
- Producer: Billy Mann

Teddy Geiger singles chronology
"For You I Will (Confidence)" (2006)	"These Walls" (2006)

Alternative cover
- Digital download cover

"For You I Will (Confidence)" is the debut single of American singer-songwriter Teddy Geiger, featured on her debut album Underage Thinking. The song was used as the theme song for the CBS comedy-drama series Love Monkey, on which Geiger played a recurring guest role. The song became a hit despite the show's cancellation and reached number 29 on the Billboard Hot 100.

As of 2024, the song and album has been removed from streaming services and the music video pulled.

== Song information ==
The song describes being in love with someone who is unaware of one’s existence and finding the confidence to overcome that obstacle.

== Release ==
The song can also be found on her 2005 EP Step Ladder under the name "Confidence". The EP version was released on September 6, 2005, but did not receive much airplay then.

Later, the song was re-released in January 2006, in a version that was used as the theme song for Love Monkey and later appeared on Geiger's Underage Thinking album. This "single version" added a stronger folk rock influence and reached number 29 on the Billboard Hot 100.

A CD single was released on June 27, 2006, in Australia and New Zealand, containing the single version of the "For You I Will (Confidence)" song, the B-side "Do You Even Care?", and the music video for the single.

== Music video ==
In the music video, a street-performing musician (Geiger) becomes enamored of a girl (Laguna Beach's Kristin Cavallari) who has a boyfriend. Later, Geiger performs at a poolside party attended by Cavallari and her boyfriend. Cavallari strips to her underwear and jumps into the water. Many partygoers then jump in fully clothed, as does Geiger. Geiger and Cavallari kiss as they come up for air. Geiger finishes a studio recording session, and Cavallari wakes from a nap on a nearby couch.

== Track listings ==
Digital download (February 2006)

1. "For You I Will (Confidence)" – 3:49

CD single (June 2006)

1. "For You I Will (Confidence)" – 3:48
2. "Do You Even Care?" – 3:54
3. "For You I Will (Confidence)" [Video] – 3:53

== Charts ==
=== Weekly charts ===
Chart (2006)	Peak position
Australia (ARIA)	12
Canada CHR/Pop Top 30 (Radio & Records)	20
Canada Hot AC Top 30 (Radio & Records)	17
New Zealand (Recorded Music NZ)	24
US Billboard Hot 100	29
US Adult Contemporary (Billboard)	29
US Adult Pop Airplay (Billboard)	10
US Pop Airplay (Billboard)	18
Venezuela Pop Rock (Record Report)	3

=== Year-end charts ===
Chart (2006)	Position
Australia (ARIA)	74
US Billboard Hot 100	100
US Adult Top 40 (Billboard)	40

== Certifications ==
Region	Certification	Certified units/sales
United States (RIAA)	Gold	500,000^{*}
^{*} Sales figures based on certification alone.

== Release history ==
Release dates and formats for "For You I Will (Confidence)"
Region	Date	Format	Label(s)	Ref.
United States	January 17, 2006	Mainstream airplay	Columbia	
