= Andy Zulla =

American producer, songwriter (b. 1966)

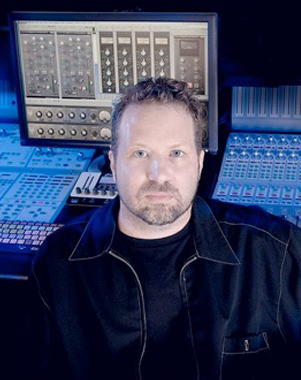
- Zulla in the studio
- Born: 1966 (age 59–60)
- Website: www.andyzullamusic.com

Andy Zulla (born 1966) is an American record mixer, record producer, composer and songwriter. Over the last 20 years, Zulla has been part of a diverse collection of projects including mixing major label and independent albums and singles, producing and composing songs and music for television and film, as well as audio for video sound and post production.

He received the Grammy Award for Best Traditional Pop Vocal Album at the 47th Annual Grammy Awards, a New York Emmy Award for Outstanding Promotional Sports Announcements in 2000, and RIAA gold and platinum albums. He has charted No. 1 on many Billboard charts as a mixer and producer, including Hot 100 singles, Top 200 Albums, Top Soundtrack albums, Top Jazz Albums and also an artist / composer on the new age album chart.

He has mixed for many artists including Rod Stewart, Kelly Clarkson, Jessica Simpson, Backstreet Boys, Clay Aiken, Kenny G, Diana Ross, Michael Bolton, Teddy Geiger and Heather Headley.

As a composer he has written music for FOX, WB, MTV, Sony Pictures, Macy's & Target.

As part of the American Idol team in the early seasons, Zulla recorded and mixed the show's very first single. Kelly Clarkson's “A Moment Like This” went to #1 on the Billboard Hot 100 chart, breaking the Beatle's longstanding record as the quickest climb to #1.

Zulla was the pop music producer for the Steven Spielberg created NBC show “Smash,” producing the cover songs with the show's stars Megan Hilty, Katharine McPhee, Jeremy Jordan and Tony award winners Christian Borle, Leslie Odom Jr. and Bernadette Peters. Working along with Marc Shaiman, he produced the show's Billboard number #1 Soundtrack album.
