= Birmingham (Amanda Marshall song) =

1996 single by Amanda Marshall

Single by Amanda Marshall

from the album Amanda Marshall
- B-side: "Let's Get Lost"
- Released: 1996
- Length: 5:21
- Label: Epic
- Songwriters: David Tyson; Gerald O'Brien; Dean McTaggart
- Producer: David Tyson

Amanda Marshall singles chronology
"Let It Rain" (1995)	"Birmingham" (1996)	"Fall from Grace" (1996)

Music video
- "Birmingham" on YouTube

"Birmingham" is a song by Canadian pop-rock singer Amanda Marshall. It was released in 1996 as the second single from her self-titled debut album (1995). The song is her most successful single in Canada, reaching number three on the RPM 100 Hit Tracks chart, and it became her only song to appear on the US Billboard Hot 100, peaking at number 43.

== Music video ==
The song's music video, directed by Jeth Weinrich, mirrors the song's lyrics by featuring a woman fleeing from an abusive relationship - ostensibly, in Birmingham, Alabama as per the title. Interspersed throughout the video are clips of Amanda Marshall performing the song. Marshall chose for the video to focus on the woman instead of the man, wanting to create a candid storyline for the female protagonist. Wayne Isaak of VH1 gave the video a positive review, calling the subject matter "empowering".

== Track listings ==
Canadian CD single and US cassette single

1. "Birmingham" – 5:21
2. "Let's Get Lost" – 4:13

European maxi-CD single

1. "Birmingham" (radio edit) – 4:09
2. "Beautiful Goodbye" (live at The Spectrum) – 5:51
3. "Promises" – 5:22

Australian maxi-CD single

1. "Birmingham" (radio edit)
2. "Birmingham" (album version)
3. "Let It Rain" (live)
4. "Fall from Grace" (live)
5. "Beautiful Goodbye" (This Could Take All Night)

Japanese CD single

1. "Birmingham" (radio edit)
2. "Last Exit to Eden" (live at the Spectrum, Montreal, Canada)
3. "Beautiful Goodbye" (live at the Spectrum, Montreal, Canada)
4. "Birmingham" (live at the Spectrum, Montreal, Canada)

== Charts ==
=== Weekly charts ===
Chart (1996)	Peak position
Australia (ARIA)	68
Canada Top Singles (RPM)	3
Canada Adult Contemporary (RPM)	4
US Billboard Hot 100	43
US Adult Pop Airplay (Billboard)	14
US Pop Airplay (Billboard)	22
US Cash Box Top 100	31

=== Year-end charts ===
Chart (1996)	Position
Canada Top Singles (RPM)	30
Canada Adult Contemporary (RPM)	28
US Top 40/Mainstream (Billboard)	100

== Release history ==
Region	Date	Format(s)	Label(s)	Ref.
Canada	1996	CD	Epic	
United States	April 2, 1996	Triple A radio	Epic	
United States	August 20, 1996	Contemporary hit radio	Epic	
Japan	May 21, 1997	CD	Epic	
