= Amanda Marshall =

Canadian singer (born 1972)

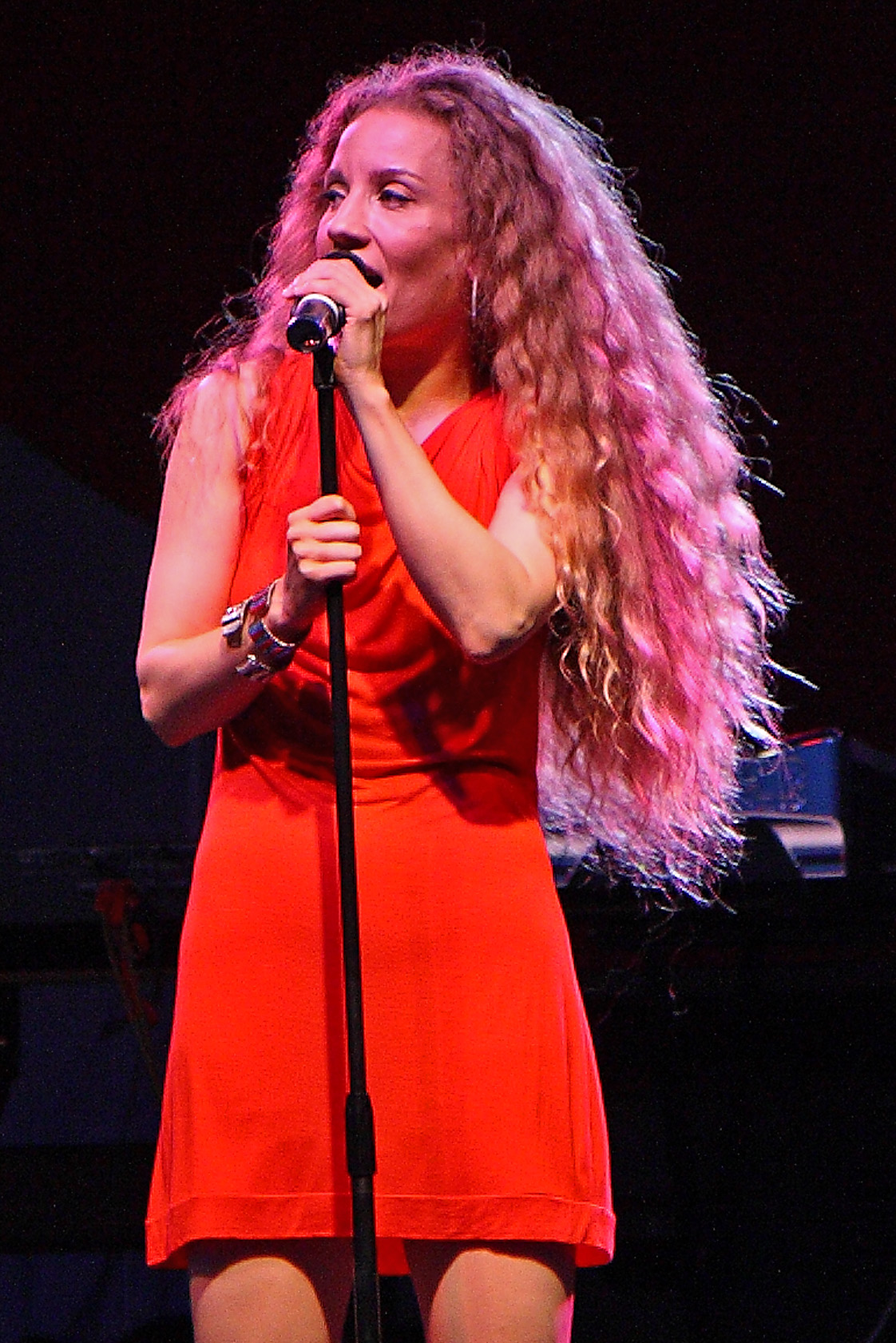
- Marshall in 2009

Background information
- Born: Amanda Meta Marshall; August 29, 1972 (age 53); Toronto, Ontario, Canada
- Genres: Soft rock; R&B; pop rock; pop; adult contemporary
- Years active: 1988–present
- Labels: Sony Music Canada; Epic
- Website: amandamarshall.com

Amanda Meta Marshall (born August 29, 1972) is a Canadian Juno award winning pop-rock singer and songwriter. She has released four studio albums; the first was certified diamond in Canada, with the second and third certified 3× platinum and platinum respectively. She is best known for her 1996 single, "Birmingham", which reached number 3 in Canada and was her only song to reach the US charts.

== Early life ==
Marshall was born in Toronto, Ontario Canada.

She grew up an only child, in her own words, "the product of an interracial marriage": her Trinidadian mother is black, her Canadian father is white. In several of her songs, Marshall has reflected on her racial identity "as a woman who looks white but is actually black".

Marshall studied music extensively during her childhood, including at the Royal Conservatory of Music in Toronto. While performing on the Queen Street West bar scene in her teens, she met guitarist Jeff Healey, who was struck by her powerful voice and took her on tour for a long time.

== Career ==
=== Debut album and critical success ===
Marshall signed a recording contract with Metalblade Records in 1991; however, both parties agreed that they were not a good fit and went their separate ways. In 1994, Marshall signed to Epic Records, and contributed to the Neil Young tribute album Borrowed Tunes: A Tribute to Neil Young the same year. Her debut album Amanda Marshall was released the following year in 1995. The album was a major success in Canada, generating a great deal of airplay and spawning six Top 40 hits—"Let It Rain", "Beautiful Goodbye", "Dark Horse", "Fall From Grace", "Sitting on Top of the World", and "Birmingham", her most successful hit in Canada and the only song to reach the US charts, charting at number 43 on the Billboard Hot 100.

In 1996, Marshall's song "This Could Take All Night" was included in the original soundtrack of Tin Cup. In 1997, Marshall's song "I'll Be Okay" was included in the original soundtrack of My Best Friend's Wedding.

Marshall's career got a huge boost when Elton John named her as an artist he was then-currently listening to when he appeared on The Rosie O'Donnell Show.

=== 1999–2000: Tuesday's Child and further success ===
In 1999, she released a successful follow-up album, Tuesday's Child. It followed in the same vein as her debut, with a mix of soulful pop songs and ballads, characterizing her powerful voice. Her song "Ride" from that album was featured in the film The Replacements and on its soundtrack. In autumn 1999, she supported Whitney Houston on the European leg of her My Love Is Your Love World Tour. Another single from that album, "Believe In You", a differently composed variant remix the second Atlantis level music from the video game Glover, was featured on one episode of Touched by an Angel and on its soundtrack as well as the 2002 direct-to-video film Kermit's Swamp Years, while Richie Sambora of Bon Jovi was the guest guitarist on the track "Why Don't You Love Me". She also co wrote a song "Right Here All Along" with Carole King, who also performed background vocals on the track. She was nominated as best songwriter at the 2000 Juno Awards.

=== 2001–2023: Everybody's Got a Story and further releases ===
In 2001, Marshall released her third album, Everybody's Got a Story. It marked a change in style and sound for Marshall, with a noticeable R&B influence. Her singles "Everybody's Got a Story" and "Sunday Morning After" received some Canadian airplay, and for the album, Marshall worked with the likes of Peter Asher and Billy Mann.

Marshall's absence from the music scene was due to legal battles with her record label after she fired her management in 2002. Those fights were not resolved for about 12 years.

In 2003, she released a greatest hits album entitled Intermission: The Singles Collection, which was followed by another greatest hits album, Collections, in 2006. In 2008, yet another greatest hits album, The Steel Box Collection, was released.

In a 2012 radio interview, Marshall announced that she was working on a new album. In the interview, she explained to the radio host that "a new CD is in the works", and that she was "hopeful" of its release in 2013; however, the album never materialized. In an article, she said that the record was "70% done".

=== 2023–present: Heavy Lifting ===
On March 27, 2023, Marshall announced her new album, Heavy Lifting, which was released on June 9, 2023, with "Rainbows in Gasoline" as the focus track, along with a Canada-wide tour. She released the first single from that album, "I Hope She Cheats", a cover of Marsha Ambrosius's "Hope She Cheats on You (With a Basketball Player)", on March 31, 2023. She then released her second single from that album, "Dawgcatcher", on May 18, 2023. On June 16, 2023, during her tour, Marshall performed 2 nights at Massey Hall in Toronto.

The album won the Juno Award for Adult Contemporary Album of the Year at the Juno Awards of 2024.

== Discography ==
=== Studio albums ===
Year	Album	Chart positions							Certifications
Year	Album	CAN	AUS	GER	NZ	UK	US	US Heat	Certifications
1995	Amanda Marshall	4	15	36	17	47	156	6	CAN: Diamond; AUS: Gold
1999	Tuesday's Child	4	84	18	—	—	—	30	CAN: 3× Platinum
2001	Everybody's Got a Story	15	—	79	—	—	—	—	CAN: Platinum
2023	Heavy Lifting	—	—	—	—	—	—	—	—

=== Compilations ===
Year	Album	CAN
2003	Intermission: The Singles Collection	95
2006	Collections	—
2008	The Steel Box Collection	—

=== Singles ===
Year	Title	Chart positions								Album
Year	Title	CAN	CAN AC	AUS	GER	NED	NZ	UK	US	Album
1995	"Let It Rain"	7	5	30	73	108	23	85	—	Amanda Marshall
1995	"Birmingham"	3	6	68	—	—	—	—	43	Amanda Marshall
1996	"Fall From Grace"	17	2	95	78	—	—	—	—	Amanda Marshall
1996	"Beautiful Goodbye"	5	4	193	—	20	—	79	—	Amanda Marshall
1997	"Dark Horse"	5	1	70	93	—	—	—	—	Amanda Marshall
1997	"Sitting on Top of the World"	5	2	—	—	—	—	—	—	Amanda Marshall
1997	"Trust Me (This Is Love)"	24	5	—	—	—	—	—	—	Amanda Marshall
1998	"Believe in You"	10	3	—	75	—	—	—	—	Tuesday's Child
1999	"Love Lift Me"	10	5	—	—	—	—	—	—	Tuesday's Child
1999	"If I Didn't Have You"	31	11	—	—	—	—	150	—	Tuesday's Child
2000	"Shades of Gray"	25	27	—	—	—	—	—	—	Tuesday's Child
2000	"Why Don't You Love Me?"	42	26	—	—	—	—	—	—	Tuesday's Child
2001	"Everybody's Got a Story"	6	—	—	—	92	—	—	—	Everybody's Got a Story
2002	"Sunday Morning After"	20	—	—	—	—	—	—	—	Everybody's Got a Story
2002	"Marry Me"	19	—	—	—	—	—	—	—	Everybody's Got a Story
2002	"Double Agent"	19	—	—	—	—	—	—	—	Everybody's Got a Story
2003	"The Voice Inside"	—	—	—	—	—	—	—	—	Everybody's Got a Story
2003	"Until We Fall In"	—	—	—	—	—	—	—	—	Intermission: The Singles Collection
2023	"I Hope She Cheats"	—	—	—	—	—	—	—	—	Heavy Lifting
2023	"Dawgcatcher"	—	—	—	—	—	—	—	—	Heavy Lifting

=== Soundtracks and appearances ===
Year	Single	Album
1994	"Don't Let It Bring You Down"	Borrowed Tunes: A Tribute to Neil Young
1996	"Dark Horse"	Two If By Sea: Original Motion Picture Soundtrack
1997	"This Could Take All Night"	Tin Cup: Music from the Motion Picture
1997	"I'll Be Okay"	My Best Friend's Wedding: Music from the Motion Picture
1998	"Believe in You"	Touched by an Angel: The Album
