= List of CMT Crossroads episodes =

This is a list of episodes of CMT Crossroads.

== Episodes ==
No.	Performers	Original release date
1	Lucinda Williams & Elvis Costello	January 13, 2002
Songs performed: "Changed the Locks", "Drunken Angel", "Indoor Fireworks", "Crescent City", "Wild Horses", "Blue", "Poisoned Rose"
2	Hank Williams Jr. & Kid Rock	February 17, 2002
Songs performed: "Midnight Rider", "Cowboy", "The 'F' Word", "Hamburger Steak, Holiday Inn", "Medley", "Whiskey Bent and Hell Bound", "Lonely Road of Faith", "Tee Tot Song", "Family Tradition"
3	Brooks & Dunn & ZZ Top	April 21, 2002
Songs performed: "Tush", "Good Girls Go to Heaven", "Hard Workin' Man", "Rough Boy", "La Grange", "She Loves My Automobile", "I'll Never Forgive My Heart", "Gimme All Your Lovin'"
4	Ryan Adams & Elton John	May 26, 2002
Songs performed: "Daniel", "Answering Bell", "Firecracker", "Oh My Sweet Carolina", "Lovesick Blues", "He'll Have to Go", "Great Balls Of Fire", "Rocket Man"
5	Willie Nelson & Sheryl Crow	June 16, 2002
Songs performed: "Jackson", "Abilene", "City of New Orleans", "Let It Be Me", "It's So Easy", "You Remain", "Crazy", "Everyday Is a Winding Road"
6	Dixie Chicks & James Taylor	October 18, 2002
Songs performed: "Sweet Baby James", "Some Days You Gotta Dance", "Wide Open Spaces", "A Home", "Shower the People", "Carolina in My Mind", "Ready to Run"
7	Travis Tritt & Ray Charles	December 6, 2002
Songs performed: "I'm Movin' On", "Doesn't Anyone Hurt Anymore", "Between an Old Memory and Me", "Georgia On My Mind", "3/4 of the Time", "Leave My Girl Alone"
8	Kenny Chesney & John Mellencamp	October 3, 2003
Songs performed: "Jack & Diane", "Live Those Songs", "Small Town", "Back Where I Come From", "R.O.C.K. in the U.S.A.", "Stones In My Passway", "Young"
9	Dolly Parton & Melissa Etheridge	November 28, 2003
Songs performed: "Come To My Window", "Jolene", "Coat of Many Colors", "I Want to Be in Love", "Bring Me Some Water", "I Will Always Love You", "9 to 5"
10	Martina McBride & Pat Benatar	December 12, 2003
Songs performed: "Promises In The Dark", "Heartbreaker", "Independence Day", "In My Daughter's Eyes", "Hit Me With Your Best Shot", "We Belong", "When God-Fearin' Women Get the Blues"
11	Emmylou Harris & Dave Matthews	January 9, 2004
Songs performed: "Gravedigger", "My Antonia", "Here I Am", "Where Are You Going", "Long Black Veil", "Imagine", "Save Me"
12	Toby Keith's Shock 'n Y'all Super Bowl Party: A CMT Crossroads Special	January 31, 2004
Appearances from Willie Nelson
13	Brad Paisley & John Mayer	May 14, 2004
Songs performed: "Celebrity", "That's Love", "Little Moments", "Come Back to Bed", "Why Georgia", "Bigger than My Body", "Daughters", "Two People Fell in Love"
14	Wynonna Judd & Heart	July 9, 2004
Songs performed: "Magic Man", "Only Love", "Dog and Butterfly", "The Perfect Goodbye", "No One Else on Earth", "Rock and Roll", "Love Hurts"
15	Montgomery Gentry & Lynyrd Skynyrd	December 10, 2004
Songs performed: "Call Me the Breeze", "Hillbilly Shoes", "My Town", "Sweet Home Alabama", "Red White & Blue (Love It or Leave)", "Hell Yeah", "All Night Long"
16	Keith Urban & John Fogerty	February 19, 2005
Songs performed: "Bad Moon Rising", "Walkin' the Country", "Days Go By", "Rambunctious Boy", "Centerfield", "You'll Think Of Me", "Down On The Corner", "Sugar-Sugar (In My Life)", "Somebody Like You"
17	Ronnie Milsap & Los Lonely Boys	June 17, 2005
Songs performed: "Smoky Mountain Rain", "How Far Is Heaven", "Stranger in My House", "More Than Love", "Real Emotions"
18	Sugarland & Bon Jovi	September 16, 2005
Songs performed: "Livin' On A Prayer", "Something More", "It's My Life", "Baby Girl", "Wanted Dead or Alive", "Just Might (Make Me Believe)", "Have A Nice Day", "Who Says You Can't Go Home"
19	Kenny Rogers & Lionel Richie	November 26, 2005
Songs performed: "She Believes in Me", "Easy", "Lady", "My Love", "Sweet Music Man", "Still", "Ruby, Don't Take Your Love To Town", "Stuck on You", "The Gambler"
20	Lyle Lovett & Bonnie Raitt	February 11, 2006
Songs performed: "North Dakota", "Thing Called Love", "My Baby Don't Tolerate", "I Don't Want Anything To Change", "Angel from Montgomery", "Do Right Woman, Do Right Man"
21	Rosanne Cash & Steve Earle	September 15, 2006
Songs performed: "Guitar Town", "Seven Year Ache", "Goodbye", "Burn Down This Town", "House on The Lake", "Western Wall", "Jerusalem", "Big River"
22	Little Big Town & Lindsey Buckingham	December 2, 2006
Songs performed: "Go Your Own Way", "Bones", "The Chain", "Big Love", "Bring It On Home", "Boondocks", "Not Too Late", "Good as Gone"
23	Ricky Skaggs & Bruce Hornsby	February 24, 2007
Songs performed: "The Way It Is", "Uncle Pen", "The Dreaded Spoon", "The Valley Road", "Come on Out", "The End of the Innocence", "Mandolin Rain", "Super Freak"
24	Reba McEntire & Kelly Clarkson	June 24, 2007
Songs performed: "Why Haven't I Heard from You", "Since U Been Gone", "Walk Away", "The Greatest Man I Never Knew", "Because of You", "Fancy" Notes: This episode was filmed at the Ryman Auditorium in Nashville.
25	Trisha Yearwood & Kenneth "Babyface" Edmonds	September 21, 2007
Songs performed: "Walkaway Joe", "When Can I See You", "Fire and Rain", "How Do I Live", "Take A Bow", "Heaven, Heartache, and the Power of Love", "Change The World"
26	LeAnn Rimes & Joss Stone	December 7, 2007
Songs performed: "Good Friend and a Glass of Wine", "Super Duper Love (Are You Diggin' on Me)", "Nothin' Better to Do", "Tell Me 'bout It", "Fell in Love with a Boy", "Summertime", "How Do I Live"
27	Alison Krauss & Robert Plant	February 11, 2008
Songs performed: "Gone, Gone, Gone (Done Moved On)", "The Boy Who Wouldn't Hoe Corn", "When the Levee Breaks", "Black Dog", "Stick With Me Baby", "Rich Woman", "Please Read The Letter", "When You Say Nothing at All"
28	Sara Evans & Maroon 5	May 9, 2008
Songs performed: "This Love", "I Could Not Ask For More", "She Will Be Loved", "Some Things Never Change", "Won't Go Home Without You", "A Real Fine Place to Start"
29	Trace Adkins & 38 Special	September 24, 2008
Songs performed: "Honky Tonk Badonkadonk", "Ladies Love Country Boys", "You're Gonna Miss This", "Chrome", "Rockin' into the Night", "Hold On Loosely", "Caught Up in You", "Muddy Water", "Wild-Eyed Southern Boys"
30	Taylor Swift & Def Leppard	November 7, 2008
Songs performed: "Photograph", "Picture to Burn", "Love Story", "Hysteria", "Teardrops on My Guitar", "When Love & Hate Collide", "Should've Said No", "Pour Some Sugar on Me", "Love", "Our Song" and "Two Steps Behind." Notes: This episode was filmed on October 6, 2008, at The Acuf Theatre in Nashville. It was released on DVD exclusively through Walmart.
31	Jamey Johnson & Shooter Jennings	March 23, 2009
Songs performed: "In Color", "It Ain't Easy", "High Cost of Living", "God Bless Alabama", "Mowing Down the Roses", "Between Jennings and Jones", "Don't You Think This Outlaw Bit's Done Got Out of Hand"
32	Jason Aldean & Bryan Adams	June 26, 2009
Songs performed: "Heaven", "Summer of '69", "Johnny Cash", "She's Country", "Hicktown", "Run to You", "Cuts Like a Knife"
33	Zac Brown Band & Jimmy Buffett	March 19, 2010
Songs performed: "Margaritaville", "Chicken Fried", "Free", "Into the Mystic", "Son of a Son of a Sailor", "Toes", "Nobody From Nowhere", "A Pirate Looks at Forty"
34	Keith Urban & John Mayer	June 18, 2010
Songs performed: "Gravity", "'Til Summer Comes Around", "Sweet Thing", "Faith", "Perfectly Lonely", "If Ever I Could Love", "Hit the Ground Runnin'" Notes: This is Urban and Mayer's second Crossroads appearance.
35	Kenny Chesney & Steve Miller	July 9, 2010
Songs performed: "The Joker", "Abracadabra", "Living In Fast Forward", "You Got Me Dizzy", "Don't Blink", "Jet Airliner", "Fly Like an Eagle", "Rock'n Me", "Summertime", "Got The Rib Back" Notes: This is Chesney's second Crossroads appearance.
36	Martina McBride & Train	July 9, 2010
Songs performed: "Marry Me", "Stay With Me", "A Broken Wing", "Drops of Jupiter", "Hey Soul Sister", "Whatever You Say", "Wrong Baby Wrong Baby Wrong" Notes: This is McBride's second Crossroads appearance.
37	Faith Hill & The Pretenders	February 5, 2011
Songs performed: "This Kiss", "Cry", "I'll Stand By You", "Brass in Pocket", "Middle Of The Road", "Piece Of My Heart", "Back on the Chain Gang", "Breathe" Notes: This episode aired lived from the Pepsi Super Bowl Fan Jam at the Verizon Theatre at Grand Prairie in Grand Prairie, Texas.
38	Luke Bryan & The Doobie Brothers	June 24, 2011
Songs performed: "China Grove", "Country Girl (Shake It for Me)", "Rain Is a Good Thing", "Someone Else Calling You Baby", "Black Water", "Long Train Runnin'"
39	Vince Gill & Sting	November 25, 2011
Songs performed: "If I Ever Lose My Faith in You", "Whenever You Come Around", "Fields of Gold", "Don't Let Our Love Start Slippin' Away", "When I Call Your Name", "Every Breath You Take"
40	Carrie Underwood & Steven Tyler	February 4, 2012
Songs performed: "Just a Dream", "Dream On", "Undo It", "Love in an Elevator", "Born to Be Wild", "Cryin'", "Before He Cheats", "Sweet Emotion", "Walk This Way" Notes: This episode aired live from the Pepsi Super Bowl Fan Jam at the Bankers Life Fieldhouse in Indianapolis.
41	Joe Walsh & Friends	June 23, 2012
Featuring: Kenny Chesney, Sara Evans, Luke Bryan, Brad Paisley, Hunter Hayes and Billy Gibbons; Songs performed: "Life's Been Good", "Rocky Mountain Way", "In The City", "Lucky That Way", "Best of My Love", "Life In The Fast Lane" Notes: This is Chesney's third, and Evans, Bryan, Gibbons, and Paisley's, second appearance.
42	Emmylou Harris and Mumford & Sons	September 20, 2012
Songs performed: "If I Needed You", "Awake My Soul", "The Road", "Angel Band", "The Cave", "Orphan Girl", "Where Are You Now", "The Boxer" Notes: This is Harris' second Crossroads appearance.
43	Randy Travis & The Avett Brothers	November 23, 2012
Songs performed: "Murder in the City", "January Wedding", "Three Wooden Crosses", "I And Love And You", "February Seven", "Forever and Ever, Amen", "Deeper Than the Holler", "He Walked on Water"
44	Rascal Flatts & Journey	February 2, 2013
Songs performed: "Separate Ways", "Life Is a Highway", "Fast Cars and Freedom", "Wheel in the Sky", "Bless the Broken Road", "Faithfully", "What Hurts the Most", "Don't Stop Believin'" Notes: This episode aired live from the New Orleans Sugar Mill and aired the night before Super Bowl XLVII.
45	Willie Nelson & Friends	June 23, 2013
Featuring: Sheryl Crow, Jamey Johnson, Norah Jones, Ashley Monroe, Neil Young and Leon Russell; Songs performed: "Blue Eyes Crying in the Rain", "Long May You Run", "Shotgun Willie", "Red Headed Strager", "Whiskey River", "Roll Me Up and Smoke Me When I Die", "Funny How Time Slips Away" Notes: This is Nelson's third, and Johnson and Crow's second appearance.
46	Lady A & Stevie Nicks	September 13, 2013
Songs performed: "Edge of Seventeen", "Love Don't Live Here", "Need You Now", "Landslide", "Golden", "Stop Draggin' My Heart Around", "Rhiannon", "Gold Dust Woman", "Cold As Stone", "Just A Kiss" Notes: This episode was ninety minutes long instead of the usual sixty minutes. Steven Tyler of Aerosmith makes a guest appearance in the audience at the end of "Stop Draggin' My Heart Around."
47	The Band Perry & Fall Out Boy	November 29, 2013
Songs performed: "Sugar, We're Goin Down", "Better Dig Two", "DONE.", "Alone Together", "My Songs Know What You Did in the Dark (Light Em Up)", "Don't Let Me Be Lonely", "If I Die Young", "Thnks fr th Mmrs"
48	Dierks Bentley & OneRepublic	March 14, 2014
Songs performed: "Apologize", "I Hold On", "Counting Stars", "Home", "I Lived", "Pride (In the Name of Love)", "Good Life", "Up on the Ridge"
49	Kacey Musgraves & Katy Perry	June 13, 2014
Songs performed: "Teenage Dream", "Follow Your Arrow", "Firework", "Here You Come Again", "Step Off", "I Can't Make You Love Me", "Roar", "Merry Go 'Round", "Keep It To Yourself", "Thinking Of You"
50	Lee Ann Womack & John Legend	September 26, 2014
Songs performed: "Ashes by Now", "Save Room", "The Way I'm Livin'", "Green Light", "You & I (Nobody in the World)", "I Hope You Dance", "I May Hate Myself in the Morning", "All of Me"
51	Jason Aldean & Bob Seger	November 28, 2014
Songs performed: "Hollywood Nights", "Tattoos on This Town", "Just Gettin' Started", "Turn the Page", "She's Country", "Night Train", "Against the Wind", "Hey Gypsy" Notes: This is Aldean's second appearance. This episode was filmed on October 28, 2014, at the Factory at Franklin in Franklin, Tennessee.
52	Brantley Gilbert & Lynyrd Skynyrd	June 27, 2015
Songs performed: "What's Your Name?", "Bottoms Up", "Kick It in the Sticks", "Gimme Three Steps", "Simple Man", "One Hell of an Amen", "Country Must Be Country Wide", "Still Unbroken", "Sweet Home Alabama" Notes: This is Lynyrd Skynyrd's second appearance.
53	Sara Evans & REO Speedwagon	September 19, 2015
Songs performed: "Take It on the Run", "A Little Bit Stronger", "A Real Fine Place To Start", "Born to Fly", "Keep On Loving You", "Listen To Her Heart", "Ridin' The Storm Out", "Roll with the Changes", "Slow Me Down" Notes: This is Evans' third appearance.
54	Jennifer Nettles & Cheap Trick	March 24, 2016
Songs performed: "Surrender", "I Want You to Want Me", "Stay", "The Flame", "When I Wake Up Tomorrow", "Unlove You", "Something More" Notes: This is Nettles' second appearance, the first time was with Sugarland.
55	Luke Bryan & Jason Derulo	May 21, 2016
Songs performed: "Want to Want Me", "Strip It Down", "Talk Dirty", "That's My Kind of Night", "Trumpets", "Country Girl (Shake It for Me)", "If It Ain't Love", "Move" Notes: This is Bryan's third appearance.
56	Thomas Rhett & Nick Jonas	June 24, 2016
Songs performed: "T-Shirt", "Chains", "Chainsaw", "Crash and Burn", "Close", "Die a Happy Man", "Jealous", "Make Me Wanna"
57	Charles Kelley & Rob Thomas	July 1, 2016
Songs performed: "Lonely No More", "Lonely Girl", "This Is How a Heart Breaks", "We Owned the Night", "The Driver", "3AM", "Love Don't Live Here", "Pieces", "Smooth" Notes: This is Kelley's second appearance, the first time was with Lady A.
58	Maren Morris & Alicia Keys	December 2, 2016
Songs performed: "Girl on Fire", "Rich", "In Common", "Angel from Montgomery", "My Church", "No One", "80s Mercedes", "If I Ain't Got You"
59	Darius Rucker & John Mellencamp	March 24, 2017
Songs Performed: "If I Told You", "Wagon Wheel", "Hold My Hand", "Pink Houses", "Alright", "Grandview", "Cherry Bomb", "Longest Days"
60	Earth, Wind & Fire & Friends	June 23, 2017
Featuring Sara Evans, Lady A, Martina McBride, Dan + Shay, Drake White, Rascal Flatts and Darius Rucker. Songs Performed: "Boogie Wonderland", "Shining Star", "That's the Way of the World", "Sing a Song", "September", "Let's Groove", "After the Love Has Gone" Notes: this is the fourth Crossroads appearance for Evans, third for McBride and Charles Kelley and the second for Rucker, Rascal Flatts and Lady A. Rucker is the first artist to have back-to-back episodes of the show.
61	Florida Georgia Line & Backstreet Boys	August 30, 2017
Songs Performed: "Smooth", "As Long as You Love Me", "God, Your Mama, and Me", "Dirt", "Everybody (Backstreet's Back)", "All I Have to Give", "Cruise", "I Want It That Way", "H.O.L.Y."
62	Old Crow Medicine Show & Kesha	December 6, 2017
Songs Performed: "Rainy Day Women ♯12 & 35", "Your Love Is My Drug", "Timber", "Old Flames Can't Hold a Candle to You", "Spaceship," "Hunt You Down," "Flicker & Shine", "Woman," "Wagon Wheel", "Tell It To Me"
63	Cam & Smokey Robinson	March 28, 2018
Songs Performed: "The Tears of a Clown", "I Second That Emotion", "Burning House", "Mayday", "Diane", "Cruisin'", "Hungover on Heartache", "Being with You", "You're All I Need to Get By"
64	Luke Combs & Leon Bridges	June 28, 2018
Songs Performed: "Bad Bad News", "Hurricane", "When It Rains It Pours", "Beyond", "Beautiful Crazy", Coming Home", "One Number Away" This episode was at Nashville Toosie Orchid Downtown in Nashville, Tennessee.
65	Brett Eldredge & Meghan Trainor	September 3, 2018
Songs Performed: "All About That Bass", "Islands in the Stream", "Haven't Met You", "No Excuses", "Wanna Be That Song", "Let You Be Right", "Beat of the Music", "Baby, It's Cold Outside"
66	Zac Brown Band & Shawn Mendes	October 24, 2018
Songs Performed: "Mercy", "Homegrown", "Stitches", "Keep Me in Mind", "In My Blood", "Colder Weather", "Man in the Mirror", "Tomorrow Never Comes", "There's Nothing Holdin' Me Back"
67	Brett Young & Boyz II Men	March 27, 2019
Songs Performed: "Motownphilly", "Mercy", "I'll Make Love to You", "Catch", "Amazed", "In Case You Didn't Know", "Water Runs Dry"
68	Brooks & Dunn & Friends	June 28, 2019
Featuring: Luke Combs, Jon Pardi, Midland, Brett Young, Cody Johnson and Lanco. Songs Performed: "My Next Broken Heart", "Mama Don't Get Dressed Up for Nothing", "Brand New Man", "Boot Scootin' Boogie", "My Maria", "Ain't Nothing 'bout You", "You're Gonna Miss Me When I'm Gone", "Red Dirt Road" Notes: This is the second Crossroads appearance for Brooks & Dunn, Combs and Young. This episode was at Nashville Toosie Orchid Downtown in Nashville, Tennessee. Brett Young is the second artist to have back-to-back episodes of the show.
69	Sheryl Crow & Friends	September 27, 2019
Featuring: Emmylou Harris, Jason Isbell, Lucius, Bonnie Raitt, Chris Stapleton and Joe Walsh; Songs performed: "Nobody's Perfect", "Everything Is Broken", "Don't", "Live Wire", "If It Makes You Happy", "Tell Me When It's Over", "Still the Good Old Days", "Walk Away", "Strong Enough" Notes: This is the third appearance for Crow and Harris and the second appearance for and Raitt and Walsh.
70	Chris Young and Gavin DeGraw	December 13, 2019
Songs performed: "I Don't Want to Be", "Not Over You", "Soldier", "Sweeter", "Drowning", "I'm Comin' Over", "Raised on Country", "Hangin' On", "Maybe I'm Amazed"
71	Kelsea Ballerini & Halsey	March 25, 2020
Songs performed: "Bad at Love", "Peter Pan", "Without Me", "Graveyard", "Homecoming Queen?", "Dreams", "Colors", "Miss Me More", "The Other Girl"
72	Margo Price & Nathaniel Rateliff	March 26, 2021
Songs performed: "Say It Louder", "Wrote a Song For Everyone", "Twinkle Twinkle", "A Little Honey", "Hey Child", "Prisoner of the Highway" Notes: Sturgill Simpson appears as a member of the band.
73	Nelly & Friends	September 1, 2021
Featuring: Florida Georgia Line, Kane Brown, Blanco Brown, Breland; Songs Performed: “Lil Bit”, “Cool Again”, “Ride wit Me”, “Cruise (Remix)”, “Country Grammar” “High Horse" This is Florida Georgia Line's second Crossroads appearance.
74	LeAnn Rimes & Friends	April 14, 2022
Featuring: Carly Pearce, Brandy Clark, Ashley McBryde and Mickey Guyton; Songs performed: "Blue", "Nothin' Better to Do", "Swingin'", "I Need You", "One Way Ticket", "Probably Wouldn't Be This Way" ,"Can't Fight the Moonlight", “How Do I Live”, “How Much a Heart Can Hold” Notes: This is the second appearance for Rimes.
75	Mickey Guyton & Black Pumas	June 15, 2022
Songs performed: "Fire", "Colors", "Black Like Me", "Better Than You Left Me", "Confines" Notes: This is the second appearance for Guyton. Guyton is the third artist to have back-to-back episodes of the show.
76	Alison Krauss & Robert Plant	November 29, 2022
Songs performed: "Can't Let Go", "Gone Gone Gone (Done Moved On)", "High and Lonesome", "When the Levee Breaks", "Rock and Roll" Notes: This is the second appearance for Krauss and Plant and the first time ever that two artists have performed together in two episodes of the show.
77	For King & Country & Friends	December 12, 2022
Featuring: Rebecca St. James, Chrissy Metz, Breland and Natalie Grant; Songs performed: "Joy to the World", "O Come, O Come, Emmanuel", "Angels We Have Heard on High", "Go Tell It on the Mountain", "Silent Night", "A Christmas Monologue", "Little Drummer Boy", "O Come, All Ye Faithful" Notes: This is the second appearance for Breland.
78	Jimmie Allen & For King & Country	February 28, 2023
Songs performed: "Relate", "Be Alright", "Unsung Hero", "Harmony", "Down Home", "God Only Knows", "Best Shot", "Joy", "What Are We Waiting For?", "Freedom Was a Highway" Notes: This is the second appearance for For King & Country, and the fourth artist to be featured in back to back episodes
79	Darius Rucker & The Black Crowes	May 16, 2023
Songs performed: "Let Her Cry", "Remedy", "Hard to Handle", "She Talks to Angels", "Wagon Wheel", "Straight to Hell" Notes: This is Rucker's third Crossroads appearance.
80	Maren Morris & Hozier	September 22, 2023
Songs performed: "Take Me to Church", "Work Song", "Eat Your Young", "All Things End", "My Church", "The Bones", "Girl", "The Tree" Notes: This is Morris' second Crossroads appearance.
81	Chris Janson & Bret Michaels	December 20, 2023
Songs performed: “Every Rose Has Its Thorn”, “Talk Dirty To Me”, “Your Mama Don't Dance", “Fix a Drink”, “Good Vibes”, “Buy Me A Boat”, "Nothin' but a Good Time"
82	Hardy & Nickelback	April 6, 2024
Songs performed: "How You Remind Me", "ROCKSTAR", "Truck Bed"
83	Jordan Davis and NEEDTOBREATHE	June 13, 2024
Songs performed: "The Outsiders", "Tucson Too Late", "Banks", "Next Thing You Know", "Brother"

== Appearances ==
4

- Sara Evans

3

- Luke Bryan
- Kenny Chesney
- Sheryl Crow
- Emmylou Harris
- Charles Kelley (two alongside Lady A)
- Martina McBride
- Darius Rucker
- Willie Nelson

2

- Jason Aldean
- Breland
- Luke Combs
- Florida Georgia Line
- For King & Country
- Billy Gibbons (The first time with ZZ Top)
- Mickey Guyton
- Jamey Johnson
- Alison Krauss
- Lady A
- Lynyrd Skynyrd
- John Mayer
- John Mellencamp
- Maren Morris
- Jennifer Nettles (The first time was with Sugarland)
- Brad Paisley
- Robert Plant
- Bonnie Raitt
- Rascal Flatts
- LeAnn Rimes
- Keith Urban
- Joe Walsh
- Brett Young
- Zac Brown Band
