= Tulip Drive =

Studio album by Jimmie Allen
- Released: June 24, 2022
- Studio: Chumba Meadows (Tarzana); Ocean Way (Nashville); Front Stage Studio (Nashville); Rhythm House (Nashville); Sound Stage Studios (Nashville)
- Genre: Country pop
- Length: 53:55
- Label: Stoney Creek
- Producer: Jason Evigan; Gian Stone; Ash Bowers; Jimmie Allen; Vinny Venditto; Vic Martin; Keith Hetrick; Jesse Frasure; Ilya Toshinsky; Eric Torres

Jimmie Allen chronology
Bettie James Gold Edition (2021)	Tulip Drive (2022)

Singles from Tulip Drive
- 1. "Down Home" Released: March 14, 2022; 2. "Be Alright" Released: April 10, 2023

Tulip Drive is the third studio album by American country music artist Jimmie Allen, released June 24, 2022 via Stoney Creek Records/BBR Music Group.

== Background ==
"Down Home" was the first single released from the album. Co-written by Tate Howell, Rian Ball, and Cameron Bedell, the song is about Allen's father. "Down Home" has made the Country Airplay chart. Allen announced the album's release in May 2022, and indicated that it would contain collaborations with Jennifer Lopez and CeeLo Green. According to an interview with CMT, Allen considered every track to be reflective of a personal experience in his life. The last track, "You Won't Be Alone", features Allen's son Aadyn.

== Critical reception ==
Buddy Iahn of The Music Universe stated that "the album’s title is deeply personal to Allen’s family ties – Tulip Drive is the name of the street his late grandmother grew up on".

Stephen Thomas Erlewine of AllMusic rated the album three stars out of five, stating that "generally, Tulip Drive is operating on cruise control on a suburban street: it's a smooth ride but kind of dull."

== Track listing ==
Tulip Drive track listing
No.	Title	Writer(s)	Producer(s)	Length
1.	"Be Alright"	Jimmie Allen; Joel Castillo; Jason Evigan; Gian Stone	Allen; Evigan; Stone	2:54
2.	"What I'm Talkin' 'Bout"	Zach Abend; Seth Ennis; Hardy	Allen; Ash Bowers	3:29
3.	"Kissin' You"	Allen; Zach Crowell; Ashley Gorley	Allen; Bowers	2:53
4.	"Down Home"	Allen; Rian Ball; Cameron Bedell; Tate Howell	Allen; Bowers	3:21
5.	"Settle On Back"	Allen; T. Howell; Tripp Howell; David Pramik	Allen; Bowers	3:20
6.	"Pesos" (featuring T-Pain and CeeLo Green)	Allen; Yannique Barker; Lonny Bereal; Thomas Callaway; Chris Doyle; Edward Martin; T-Pain; Vinny Venditto	Venditto; Vic Martin	3:28
7.	"Love in the Living Room"	Allen; Cary Barlowe; Brandon Day; Jesse Frasure; Alysa Vanderhym	Allen; Frasure	3:10
8.	"On My Way" (featuring Jennifer Lopez)	Ivy Adara; Leroy Clampitt; Michael Pollack	Keith Hetrick	2:57
9.	"Broken Hearted" (featuring Katie Ohh)	Allen; Gorley; Will Weatherly	Allen; Bowers	2:49
10.	"Habits & Hearts"	Jess Cates; Steve McMorran; Derrick Southerland	Allen; Bowers	3:30
11.	"Right Now"	Allen; Matt Rogers; Jordan Schmidt	Allen; Bowers	3:24
12.	"Wouldn't Feel Like Summer"	Vanderhym; Matt McGinn; Jimmie Deeghan	Allen; Bowers	3:00
13.	"Undo"	Breland; Matt McVaney; Rogers	Allen; Bowers	3:01
14.	"Get You a Girl"	Allen; Matt Jenkins	Allen; Ilya Toshinsky	3:12
15.	"Keep 'em Coming"	Allen; Weatherly; Brad Tursi	Allen; Bowers	2:43
16.	"Every Time I Say Amen"	Ross Copperman; Travis Hill; Jon Nite	Allen; Bowers	3:20
17.	"You Won't Be Alone" (featuring Aadyn)	Allen; Justin Ebach	Bowers; Torres	3:24

== Personnel ==
Adapted from the album's liner notes.

Musicians

- Jimmie Allen – lead vocals, background vocals
- Cary Barlowe – electric guitar
- Joel Castillo – background vocals
- David Cohen – keys
- Chris Daniel – drum programming
- David Dorn – piano, keys, synth, B3 organ, keyboards
- Jason Evigan – keyboards, guitar
- Jesse Frasure – keyboards, bass, drums, programming
- CeeLo Green – vocals, background vocals (track 6)
- Lee Hendricks – bass guitar
- Keith Hetrick – all instruments (track 8)
- Mark Hill – bass guitar
- Evan Hutchings – drums, digital programming, percussion
- Vic Martin – background vocals
- Justin Ostrander – electric guitar
- Sol Philcox – electric guitar
- Mark Prentice – electric guitar
- Adam Shoenfeld – electric guitar
- Gian Stone – background vocals
- T-Pain – vocals, background vocals (track 6)
- Eric Torres – acoustic guitar, background vocals
- Ilya Toshinsky – acoustic guitar, electric guitar, mandolin, banjo

Production

- Jim Cooley – mixing (tracks 1–5, 9–16)
- Vinny Venditto – mixing, engineering (track 6)
- Jeff Gunnell – mixing (track 7)
- Trevor Muzzy – mixing, vocal production (track 8)
- Eric Torres – mixing (track 17)
- Adam Ayan – mastering (track 7)
- Andrew Mendelson – mastering
- Eric Torres – engineering (tracks 2–5, 9–17)
- Jason Evigan – engineering, vocal production (track 1)
- Gian Stone – engineering, programming, vocal production (track 1)
- Jesse Frasure – engineering (track 7)
- Evan Hutchings – engineering

Artwork

- Anthony Depree – album design
