= No I in Beer =

2020 song by Brad Paisley

Single by Brad Paisley
- Released: April 15, 2020
- Genre: Country
- Length: 3:36 (album version); 3:09 (radio edit)
- Label: Arista Nashville
- Songwriters: Brad Paisley; Kelley Lovelace
- Producers: Dann Huff; Luke Wooten

Brad Paisley singles chronology
"My Miracle" (2019)	"No I in Beer" (2020)	"Freedom Was a Highway" (2021)

Music video
- "No I in Beer" on YouTube

"No I in Beer" is a song recorded by American country music artist Brad Paisley. It was released on April 15, 2020 by Arista Nashville. The song was written by Paisley and Kelley Lovelace in 2018, produced by Dann Huff and Luke Wooten.

== Background ==
Paisley mentioned in a statement: "People are utilizing this time to connect and to feel solidarity as human beings," "This song wasn't written for this specific moment we are all facing, but it takes on a new meaning for me when I hear it now." Paisley said it takes on a new meaning during the COVID-19 pandemic, and continue mentioned in a news: "If we've ever felt unified as Americans, as citizens of the world, it's in the fact that nobody loves what we're going through, but everybody's willing to do what we have to do. One of those things is, let's be a team."

== Composition ==
The song is in E Major.

== Music video ==
The video premiered on July 30, 2020 during the COVID-19 pandemic. It features Paisley and fans, along with music, sports, and political personalities from more than 39 different countries worldwide, singing along and performing from home, and attempting the viral TikTok "beersketball" challenge. It includes news footage of Paisley Zoom crashing birthdays, cancer-free celebrations, happy hours, nurses’ and teachers’ meetings, and other “virtual” gatherings.

Various Zoom and FaceTime cameos include Carrie Underwood, Tim McGraw, Lindsay Ell, Darius Rucker, Jimmie Allen, Brett Kissel, Kelsea Ballerini, Kimberly Williams-Paisley, Peyton Manning, Alex Rodriguez, Pete Buttigieg, Michael Steele, Fred Armisen, Dan Crenshaw, George Stephanopoulos, and Clayton Kershaw.

== Charts ==
=== Weekly charts ===
Chart (2020)	Peak position
Canada Country (Billboard)	24
US Country Airplay (Billboard)	22
US Hot Country Songs (Billboard)	29

=== Year-end charts ===
Chart (2020)	Position
US Hot Country Songs (Billboard)	86
