= Matt Stell =

American country music singer, guitarist, and songwriter

- Born: Matthew Neal Stell; April 19, 1984 (age 42); Center Ridge, Arkansas, U.S.
- Genres: Country
- Years active: 2006–present
- Labels: 124, Arista Nashville, Records Nashville
- Website: www.mattstell.com

Matthew Neal Stell (born April 19, 1984) is an American country music singer, guitarist, and songwriter. His song "Prayed for You" and his EP Everywhere but On were released in 2019.

== Early life ==
Stell was born in Clinton, Arkansas, and raised in Center Ridge, Arkansas. He played basketball during high school in the Amateur Athletic Union summer league, and from 2002 to 2006, he played college basketball for Drury University for four years on an athletic scholarship.

After college he worked farming and construction jobs while studying for a master's degree in communications at the University of Arkansas. A medical missions trip to Haiti inspired him to apply to a post-baccalaureate premedical program to complete pre-med coursework not taken as a religion and philosophy major. He applied to Harvard University's Extension School part-time pre-med program, and he was accepted. But in 2014, shortly before the program would have begun, he had the opportunity to sign a publishing deal with Wide Open Music, and he chose music over starting the part-time pre-med program.

== Music career ==
In the late 2000s and early 2010s, Stell played as the lead singer of the band The Crashers. During this time, he released three albums independently: The Sound & the Story, Vestibule Blues, and in March 2013, A River Through It, the latter two of which were on the label 124 Records. He continued playing gigs, and opened for major artists including Luke Bryan and Eric Church. He also wrote for other artists, including Bart Crow, Casey Donahew, and the John D. Hale Band. He moved to Nashville in 2014.

Stell released an EP, Last of the Best, on March 16, 2018. He also released the single, "Prayed For You", which he co-wrote with Allison Veltz and producer Ash Bowers. Rolling Stone named "Prayed For You" one of the "10 Best Country Songs to Hear Now". The song captured the attention of Barry Weiss, former president and CEO of Jive Records, who signed Stell to his label, RECORDS, in July 2018. Keith Gale, president of Good Company Entertainment, signed on to promote the song to radio. Also in 2018, Stell was named a CMT Discovery Artist.

In February 2019, "Prayed For You" reached No. 36 on Billboard's Hot Country Songs chart and in March 2019 it reached No. 54 on Billboard's Country Airplay chart. The song received over 15 million plays on Spotify and 44 million altogether within just over a year. The official music video for the song starred reality TV star Savannah Chrisley and her fiancé, hockey player Nic Kerdiles. It premiered at People on July 9, 2018 and received over 4.3 million views on YouTube in its first 10 months.

Matt made his Grand Ole Opry debut on April 27, 2019. The same month, Arista Nashville and Sony Music Nashville joined the team working to promote his career. He makes a return appearance at the Grand Ole Opry on June 12, 2019, with Old Crow Medicine Show and the Del McCoury Band. In May, Taste of Country named him an Artist to Watch. His major label debut EP, the seven-song Everywhere But On, released May 24, 2019, on Records/Arista Nashville, a week after the debut of the music video for the title track. The EP includes a collaboration with Jimmie Allen.

On September 16, 2019, Stell was presented with a RIAA Gold certification for "Prayed for You".

On October 8, 2021, Stell released the song "Boyfriend Season." The song is slated for inclusion alongside the Better Than That EP tracklist on an upcoming album, set to be released in 2022. In 2022, he released the single "Man Made" as well as the promotional single "One of Us".

== Discography ==
=== Studio albums ===
Title	Album details
The Sound & the Story	Release date: March 3, 2009; Label: Independent
Vestibule Blues	Release date: May 11, 2011; Label: 124 Records
A River Through It	Release date: March 19, 2013; Label: 124 Records
Born Lonely	Release date: June 7, 2024; Label: Records

=== Live albums ===
Title	Album details
Live at the Snorty Horse	Release date: 2006; Label: Independent

=== Extended plays ===
Title	EP details	Peak chart positions
Title	EP details	US Country
Last of the Best	Release date: March 16, 2018; Label: Wide Open	—
Everywhere but On	Release date: May 24, 2019; Label: Records, Arista Nashville	32
Better Than That	Release date: October 16, 2020; Label: Records, Arista Nashville	43
One of Us	Release date: February 10, 2023; Label: Records	—
"—" denotes releases that did not chart

=== Singles ===
Year	Title	Peak chart positions				Sales	Certifications	Album/EP
Year	Title	US	US Country	US Country Airplay	CAN Country	Sales	Certifications	Album/EP
2019	"Prayed for You"	36	2	1	23	US: 134,000	RIAA: 2× Platinum	Everywhere but On
2019	"Everywhere but On"	48	11	1	6		RIAA: Gold	Everywhere but On
2021	"That Ain't Me No More"	—	47	35	—			Non-album single
2022	"Man Made"	—	—	36	—			One of Us
2023	"Breakin' In Boots"	—	—	21	48			Born Lonely
"—" denotes a release that did not chart
