= Down Home (Jimmie Allen song) =

Single by Jimmie Allen

from the album Tulip Drive
- Released: March 14, 2022
- Genre: Country
- Length: 3:21
- Label: Stoney Creek
- Songwriters: Jimmie Allen; Rian Ball; Cameron Bedell; Tate Howell
- Producers: Ash Bowers; Jimmie Allen

Jimmie Allen singles chronology
"Freedom Was a Highway" (2020)	"Down Home" (2022)	"Be Alright" (2023)

"Down Home" is a song by American country music singer Jimmie Allen. It was released on March 14, 2022 as the lead single from his third studio album Tulip Drive. Allen co-wrote the song with Rian Ball, Cameron Bedell, and Tate Howell, and co-produced with Ash Bowers.

== Content ==
The song is a tribute to Allen's father, who died in 2019. Allen shot the video at his childhood house. He co-wrote the song during a session with Rian Ball, Cameron Bedell, and Tate Howell, the last of whom is the guitarist in Allen's touring band. Allen said that he often found himself becoming emotional when recording the song, and continued to feel that way in concert. In particular, he cited the line "I got a daughter now" as being a point where he often found difficulty continuing to sing the song in a live setting, as Allen's father never met his daughters.

== Charts ==
=== Weekly charts ===
Weekly chart performance for "Down Home"
Chart (2022–2023)	Peak position
US Billboard Hot 100	61
US Country Airplay (Billboard)	2
US Hot Country Songs (Billboard)	16

=== Year-end charts ===
2022 year-end chart performance for "Down Home"
Chart (2022)	Position
US Country Airplay (Billboard)	58
US Hot Country Songs (Billboard)	68

2023 year-end chart performance for "Down Home"
Chart (2023)	Position
US Country Airplay (Billboard)	49
US Hot Country Songs (Billboard)	94
