= The Future (Nathaniel Rateliff & the Night Sweats album) =

Studio album by Nathaniel Rateliff & the Night Sweats
- Released: November 5, 2021
- Studio: Broken Creek Studio (Colorado)
- Genre: Soul; rock; blues
- Length: 41:51
- Label: Stax
- Producer: Brad Cook; R.M.B.; Elijah Thomson

Nathaniel Rateliff & the Night Sweats chronology
And It's Still Alright (2020)	The Future (2021)	South of Here (2024)

The Future is the third studio album by American rock band Nathaniel Rateliff & the Night Sweats. It was released on November 5, 2021 by Stax Records. The album was produced by Brad Cook and R.M.B. (consisting of Rateliff, Patrick Meese, and James Barone) with additional production by Elijah Thompson.

== Background ==
The band recorded The Future in Rateliff's Broken Creek Studio outside of Denver and wrote songs that reflected on times during the COVID-19 pandemic. In a press release, Rateliff said of the recording process: "When I was writing the record, we were in the middle of a pandemic and our future looked pretty bleak. I just continue to try to write from a place of hope. Then my own neurosis, and maybe being a Libra gets in the way, and I can’t make up my mind. There is this constant back-and-forth battle in me personally and I am sure that comes out in my writing."

== Singles ==
The album's lead single "Survivor" was released on August 18, 2021. The song peaked at number 46 on the Hot Rock & Alternative Songs chart. It served as the theme song for The Jinx: Part Two, the second season of the true crime documentary series The Jinx.

=== Promotional singles ===
The album's first promotional single "Love Don't" was released on September 26, 2021 followed by "What If I" on October 15, 2021.

== Critical reception ==
Professional ratings
Aggregate scores
Source	Rating
AnyDecentMusic?	7.4/10
Metacritic	79/100
Review scores
Source	Rating
AllMusic	4/5 stars
American Songwriter	3.5/5 stars
The Line of Best Fit	8/10
Rolling Stone	3.5/4 stars

Upon its release, The Future received positive reviews from critics. At Metacritic, which assigns a normalized rating out of 100 based on reviews from mainstream publications, the album received an average score of 79 based on 8 reviews, indicating "generally favorable reviews".

== Track listing ==
All tracks are written by Nathaniel Rateliff, except track 2 which was co-written by Rateliff with Sam Cohen and Patrick Meese.

No.	Title	Length
1.	"The Future"	3:41
2.	"Survivor"	4:01
3.	"Face Down in the Moment"	4:39
4.	"Something Ain't Right"	3:34
5.	"Love Me Till I'm Gone"	3:48
6.	"Baby I Got Your Number"	3:31
7.	"What If I"	3:34
8.	"I'm on Your Side"	3:18
9.	"So Put Out"	3:01
10.	"Oh, I"	3:28
11.	"Love Don't"	5:10
Total length:		41:51

== Charts ==
=== Weekly charts ===
Chart performance for The Future
Chart (2021)	Peak position
Belgian Albums (Ultratop Flanders)	116
Belgian Albums (Ultratop Wallonia)	77
Scottish Albums (OCC)	17
UK Albums (OCC)	69
UK Album Downloads (OCC)	27
UK Americana Albums (OCC)	2
US Billboard 200	165
