= Make Me Want To =

Single by Jimmie Allen

from the album Mercury Lane
- Released: February 1, 2019
- Genre: Country
- Length: 2:52
- Label: Stoney Creek
- Songwriters: Jimmie Allen; Paul Sikes; Jennifer Denmark
- Producers: Ash Bowers; Eric Torres

Jimmie Allen singles chronology
"Best Shot" (2018)	"Make Me Want To" (2019)	"This Is Us" (2020)

Music video
- "Make Me Want To" on YouTube

"Make Me Want To" is a song co-written and recorded by American country music singer Jimmie Allen. It is his second single overall, and the second from his 2018 debut album Mercury Lane. Allen wrote the song with Paul Sikes and Jennifer Denmark, and Ash Bowers co-produced it with Eric Torres. "Make Me Want To" gave Allen his second number one hit on the Billboard Country Airplay chart. Its 58-week climb to number one is considered one of the longest climbs in that chart's history. The song also peaked at numbers seven and 49 on both the Hot Country Songs and Hot 100 charts respectively. It was certified Platinum by the Recording Industry Association of America (RIAA), and has sold 34,000 copies in the US as of March 2020. It achieved similar chart prominence in Canada, reaching number five on the Country chart. An accompanying music video for the single, directed by Justin Nolan Key, features Allen casting spells by waving a magical wand.

== Content and history ==
Taste of Country described it as an "easy love song" similar in tone to its predecessor, "Best Shot". Allen himself said of the song that "I'm a sensitive guy. A lot of times I catch feelings fast, maybe too fast. It's a song about a guy that meets a girl and he catches feeling and he's not afraid to tell her".

== Commercial performance ==
"Make Me Want To" reached number one on the Billboard Country Airplay chart dated March 7, 2020. Having topped the chart in its 58th chart week, the song set two records: the longest climb to number one and the longest overall chart run in that chart's history, having surpassed Rodney Atkins's "Caught Up in the Country", which logged 57 weeks in 2018–2019. Both records have since been broken by Travis Denning's single "After a Few", which extended its run on the chart to 60 weeks in May 2020 and reached number one in its 65th chart week in June 2020. On the Billboard Hot 100, it debuted at number 84 the week of January 11. Eight weeks later, it peaked at number 49 the week of February 22, and stayed on the chart for ten weeks. On December 9, 2020, the song was certified platinum by the RIAA in the US, denoting combined sales and streams for over a million units. It has sold 34,000 copies as of March 2020.

== Music video ==
A lyric video for "Make Me Want To" premiered on Allen's YouTube channel on January 29, 2019. The official music video, directed by Justin Nolan Key, premiered in May 2019. The video features Allen casting spells with a magic wand given to him by a fairy godmother. In an interview with CMT, Allen explained that he was a fan of Disney, Harry Potter and The Notebook, and wanted to film something that brought all three of his favorites together, adding that this was "the first of a five-part music video collection."

== Live performance ==
On December 27, 2018, Allen performed "Make Me Want To" on NBC's Today.

== Charts ==
=== Weekly charts ===
Chart (2019–2020)	Peak position
Canada Country (Billboard)	5
US Billboard Hot 100	49
US Country Airplay (Billboard)	1
US Hot Country Songs (Billboard)	7

=== Year-end charts ===
Chart (2019)	Position
US Hot Country Songs (Billboard)	76

Chart (2020)	Position
US Country Airplay (Billboard)	35
US Hot Country Songs (Billboard)	52

== Certifications ==
Region	Certification	Certified units/sales
Canada (Music Canada)	Gold	40,000^{‡}
United States (RIAA)	Platinum	1,000,000^{‡}
^{‡} Sales+streaming figures based on certification alone.
