= Mercury Lane =

Studio album by Jimmie Allen
- Released: October 12, 2018
- Genre: Country
- Length: 46:52
- Label: Stoney Creek
- Producers: Ash Bowers; Eric Torres

Jimmie Allen chronology
Mercury Lane (2018)	Bettie James Gold Edition (2021)

Singles from Mercury Lane
- 1. "Best Shot" Released: February 20, 2018; 2. "Make Me Want To" Released: February 1, 2019

Mercury Lane is the debut studio album by American country music singer Jimmie Allen. It was released on October 12, 2018 via Broken Bow Records' Stoney Creek imprint. The album includes the singles "Best Shot" and "Make Me Want To".

== Content ==
The album is named after the street on which Allen grew up. He wrote over half of the album's 15 tracks. Serving as producer are Eric Torres and Ash Bowers, the latter of whom also formerly recorded on Stoney Creek. Of the album's content, Allen said that it "touches on all of those ideals and truly feels like I’m sharing a piece of my heart with the world. I’ve been working toward this moment for so long; I can’t wait to share it with everyone." The track "Boy Gets a Truck" was previously recorded by Keith Urban on his 2016 album Ripcord.

== Critical reception ==
CelebMix reviewer Laura Klonowski called it "an accomplished, polished record" and "a coming of age country album that firmly puts Jimmie Allen on the map as the most exciting male country artist currently on the scene." Pip Ellwood-Hughes of Entertainment Focus thought that the album was "solid", while praising Allen's vocals on "Wait for It" and "Underdog" and the lyrics of "How to Be Single", but also stating that "he plays it a little too safe opting for songs that are likely to hit on radio rather than connect with the listener." It received 3 out of 5 stars from Stephen Thomas Erlewine of AllMusic, who wrote that "Possessed with a friendly, unassuming voice, Allen is pleasing to hear, but he fades into the background a bit too easily."

== Commercial performance ==
The album debuted at No. 11 on Top Country Albums, with 3,000 copies sold and 7,000 in equivalent album units. It sold a further 900 copies the following week. It has sold 13,800 copies in the United States as of April 2019.

== Track listing ==
No.	Title	Writer(s)	Length
1.	"American Heartbreaker"	Jimmie Allen; Lance Miller; Chris Stevens; Ash Bowers	2:47
2.	"Make Me Want To"	Allen; Paul Sikes; Jennifer Denmark	2:52
3.	"Deserve to Be"	Allen; Danielle Blakey; Tripp Howell	3:40
4.	"How to Be Single"	Natalie Hemby; Shane McAnally; Jimmy Robbins	2:59
5.	"Wait for It"	Bowers; Thom McHugh; Steve Williams	3:12
6.	"High Life"	Miller; Brett Warren; Brad Warren; Stevens	3:16
7.	"21"	Brandon Hood; Josh Jenkins; Bowers	2:48
8.	"Underdogs"	Bowers; Brandon Lay; Jonathan Singleton	2:57
9.	"Like You Do"	Allen; JP Williams; Josh London; Jason Mizell	3:10
10.	"Back of Your Mind"	Allen; Matthew McVaney; Devin Tolentino	2:55
11.	"Boy Gets a Truck"	Bowers; Aaron Scherz	3:27
12.	"County Lines"	Brett Tyler; Ben Burgess; Matt Dragstrem	3:03
13.	"Best Shot"	Allen; Josh London; J.P. Williams	3:16
14.	"Warrior"	Allen; Bowers; Casey Beathard	3:30
15.	"All Tractors Ain't Green"	Allen; Hood; Tim Nichols	3:00
Total length:			46:52

== Personnel ==
Adapted from AllMusic

- Jimmie Allen - lead vocals, background vocals
- Dave Cohen - Hammond B-3 organ, keyboards, piano
- David Dorn - Hammond B-3 organ, keyboards, piano
- Lee Hendricks - bass guitar
- Mark Hill - bass guitar
- Brandon Hood - electric guitar
- Evan Hutchings - drums, programming
- Troy Lancaster - electric guitar
- Gale Mayes - choir
- Rob McNelley - electric guitar
- Andrea Merritt - choir
- Wendy Moten - choir
- Justin Ostrander - electric guitar
- Adam Shoenfeld - electric guitar
- Eric Torres - background vocals
- Ilya Toshinsky - banjo, acoustic guitar, electric guitar, mandolin

== Charts ==
=== Weekly charts ===
Chart (2018)	Peak position
US Billboard 200	128
US Top Country Albums (Billboard)	11

=== Year-end charts ===
Chart (2019)	Position
US Top Country Albums (Billboard)	66
Chart (2020)	Position
US Top Country Albums (Billboard)	85
