= Everywhere but On =

Single by Matt Stell

from the EP Everywhere but On
- Released: December 2, 2019
- Genre: Country
- Length: 3:12
- Label: RECORDS; Arista Nashville
- Songwriters: Matt Stell; Lance Miller; Paul Sikes
- Producers: Matt Stell; Ash Bowers

Matt Stell singles chronology
"Prayed for You" (2019)	"Everywhere but On" (2019)	"That Ain't Me No More" (2021)

"Everywhere but On" is a song recorded by American country music singer Matt Stell. It is the second single from his 2019 EP Everywhere but On.

== Content ==
Stell wrote the song with Lance Miller and Paul Sikes. The song is about a man who is attempting to get through a breakup; according to Stell, he was going through a breakup while writing the song. According to Stell, the idea came when Sikes presented the title lyric "I've moved everywhere but on", after which the three writers decided to build around the title lyric. Stell describes the song as "super personal" because he included details from his own relationship in it. People described the song as "express[ing] how difficult it is to move on".

== Chart performance ==
=== Weekly charts ===
Chart (2019–2020)	Peak position
Canada Hot 100 (Billboard)	92
Canada Country (Billboard)	6
US Billboard Hot 100	48
US Country Airplay (Billboard)	1
US Hot Country Songs (Billboard)	11

=== Year-end charts ===
Chart (2020)	Position
US Country Airplay (Billboard)	32
US Hot Country Songs (Billboard)	42

== Certifications ==
Region	Certification	Certified units/sales
United States (RIAA)	Platinum	1,000,000^{‡}
^{‡} Sales+streaming figures based on certification alone.
