= Prayed for You =

Single by Matt Stell

from the EP Everywhere but On
- Released: May 28, 2019
- Genre: Country
- Length: 3:30
- Label: RECORDS; Arista Nashville
- Songwriters: Matt Stell; Allison Veltz; Ash Bowers
- Producers: Matt Stell; Ash Bowers

Matt Stell singles chronology
"Prayed for You" (2019)	"Everywhere but On" (2019)

"Prayed for You" is a song recorded by American country music singer Matt Stell. It is his debut single and appears on his debut extended play Everywhere but On. Stell co-wrote the song with Ash Bowers, with whom he co-produced it, and Allison Veltz.

== Content ==
Stell wrote the song with Allison Veltz and Ash Bowers. According to Stell, Veltz presented himself and Ash with the lyric "Didn’t know you from Adam, it was more than I could fathom, but I prayed for you" when the two were waiting for Bowers to arrive at a writing session. He told the site PopCulture.com that "We took off from there, and kind of infused it with our own relationship experiences, and not only relationships; the song is about a relationship, but it's also about persevering, in anything, whether it's school, work, family, just hanging in there long enough to allow good things to happen." The song appears on Stell's debut EP, Everywhere but On.

== Critical reception ==
In Digital Journal, Markos Papadatos wrote that, "Stell’s song is meaningful and its lyrics are pure poetry." Robert K. Oermann of MusicRow gave the single a mixed review, stating that "The winsome song is well crafted, and he sings with gusto. The paint-by-numbers production does nothing for me."

== Commercial performance ==
"Prayed for You" reached No. 1 on Billboard's Country Airplay chart dated October 12, 2019. It was certified Platinum by the RIAA on September 18, 2019. The song has sold 134,000 copies in the United States as of December 2019.

== Music video ==
The music video for the song first premiered at People on July 9, 2018 and stars reality TV star Savannah Chrisley and her fiancé, hockey player Nic Kerdiles.

A man in his pickup truck (played by Nic), parked at a church, glances one last time at a photo of him and his ex-girlfriend, before swiftly tossing it out his window. The pastor of the church soon comes out and greets him, and a woman inside (played by Savannah) greets him as well. The pastor instructs the two what needs to be cleaned in the church and leaves. Soon after they begin cleaning, however, the two begin flirting by throwing rags at each other (as well as spraying one another). When the pastor walks in to check on them, the two have thrown rags all over the church, making a mess. The pastor walks away with a stern expression on his face.

The two soon finish cleaning, with the pastor thanking the man, and drive off in the man's pickup truck, holding hands. Later in the evening, the two head to a Matt Stell concert, still holding hands, where he is performing the song. When it ends, the two kiss.

== Charts ==
=== Weekly charts ===
Chart (2019)	Peak position
Canada Country (Billboard)	23
US Billboard Hot 100	36
US Country Airplay (Billboard)	1
US Hot Country Songs (Billboard)	2
US Rolling Stone Top 100	89

=== Year-end charts ===
Chart (2019)	Position
US Country Airplay (Billboard)	17
US Hot Country Songs (Billboard)	19

== Certifications ==
Region	Certification	Certified units/sales
Canada (Music Canada)	Gold	40,000^{‡}
United States (RIAA)	2× Platinum	2,000,000^{‡}
^{‡} Sales+streaming figures based on certification alone.
