= S.O.B. (song) =

Single by Nathaniel Rateliff & the Night Sweats

from the album Nathaniel Rateliff & the Night Sweats
- Released: 2015
- Genre: Soul; rock; gospel
- Length: 4:07
- Label: Stax; Concord
- Songwriter: Nathaniel Rateliff
- Producer: Richard Swift

Nathaniel Rateliff & the Night Sweats singles chronology
"You Should've Seen the Other Guy" (2011)	"S.O.B." (2015)	"Look It Here" (2015)

Music video
- "S.O.B." on YouTube

"S.O.B." is a song by American rock band Nathaniel Rateliff & the Night Sweats. It was released as the lead single from their self-titled debut album. The song gained exposure after the band performed it on Jimmy Fallon's The Tonight Show on August 5, 2015.

== Content ==
Rateliff has said the song is, at heart, a troubled song about drinking one's life away after a break-up, and explained that the lyrics are based on his personal experience with delirium tremens during alcohol withdrawal. He also described it as a "joke song" and said that, originally, his band did not plan to record it but, due to positive reception, did so and released it as a single.

== Music video ==
The music video was released on July 15, 2015. It was directed and edited by Greg Barnes, and produced by Melissa Giles. The video depicts Nathaniel Rateliff and his band performing the song in front of an audience of prisoners and is an homage to the end credits scene of the 1980 film The Blues Brothers.

== Usage in media ==
- In late May 2016 and again in 2017, "S.O.B." was featured on Lipton's iced tea commercials.
- In April 2017, "S.O.B." was featured in the season three premiere of FX's Fargo.
- In May 2017, "S.O.B." was featured in an advertisement for Infiniti's Spring sales campaign.
- In February 2018, "S.O.B." was featured in promos for the second season of the IFC comedy Brockmire.
- "S.O.B." is used as the theme for the BBC sitcom Two Doors Down.
- It was also featured in the first episode of DC Comics “Titans” series in Netflix in October 2018.
- The song features in the Netflix series Atypical, playing in Season 3, Episode 10, titled "Searching for Brown Sugar Man", released 1 November 2019.
- It was featured in Amazon Studios' TV series, Goliath, Billy Bob Thornton.
- It was featured in Netflix' series, Better Things, Season 5 Episode 2.

== Charts and certifications ==
=== Weekly charts ===
Chart (2015–2016)	Peak position
Belgium (Ultratop 50 Flanders)	7
Belgium (Ultratip Bubbling Under Wallonia)	22
Canada Hot 100 (Billboard)	36
Ireland (IRMA)	58
Scottish Singles Sales (Official Charts)	98
Switzerland (Schweizer Hitparade)	9
UK Singles (Official Charts Company)	183
US Adult Alternative Airplay (Billboard)	1
US Alternative Airplay (Billboard)	3
US Hot Rock & Alternative Songs (Billboard)	8
US Mainstream Rock (Billboard)	18
US Rock & Alternative Airplay (Billboard)	3

=== Year-end charts ===
Chart (2015)	Position
US Adult Alternative Songs (Billboard)	34
US Alternative Songs (Billboard)	38
US Hot Rock Songs (Billboard)	31
US Rock Airplay Songs (Billboard)	37
Chart (2016)	Position
Belgium (Ultratop Flanders)	98
Switzerland (Schweizer Hitparade)	75
US Alternative Songs (Billboard)	33
US Hot Rock Songs (Billboard)	38
US Rock Airplay Songs (Billboard)	26

=== Certifications ===
Region	Certification	Certified units/sales
Canada (Music Canada)	4× Platinum	320,000^{‡}
Switzerland (IFPI Switzerland)	Gold	15,000^{‡}
United States (RIAA)	Platinum	1,000,000^{‡}
^{‡} Sales+streaming figures based on certification alone.

== See also ==
- List of Billboard number-one adult alternative singles of the 2010s
