= Bettie James Gold Edition =

Studio album by Jimmie Allen
- Released: June 25, 2021
- Genre: Country, contemporary R&B
- Label: Stoney Creek
- Producer: Jimmie Allen; Ash Bowers

Jimmie Allen chronology
Mercury Lane (2018)	Bettie James Gold Edition (2021)	Tulip Drive (2022)

Singles from Bettie James Gold Edition
- 1. "Freedom Was a Highway" Released: February 1, 2021

Bettie James Gold Edition is the second studio album by American country music singer Jimmie Allen. It was released on June 25, 2021, via BBR Music Group. Prior to the album's release, seven songs from the album were released in 2020 as an extended play titled Bettie James. Both the extended play and full album are entirely composed of collaborations with country, contemporary R&B, and pop music artists. The extended play and album have accounted for two singles: "This Is Us" featuring Noah Cyrus, and "Freedom Was a Highway" featuring Brad Paisley.

== Content ==
Bettie James was originally issued as a seven-song extended play on July 10, 2020. The album's name comes from Allen's father, James Allen, and grandmother, Bettie Snead. Allen co-produced the EP with Ash Bowers, and recorded every track as a duet. Collaborators include Tim McGraw, Darius Rucker, Mickey Guyton, Charley Pride, and The Oak Ridge Boys. The extended play's lead single was "This Is Us", a duet with Noah Cyrus.

In June 2021, BBR Music Group released Bettie James Gold Edition, which consists of all seven songs off the extended play plus nine more. Included in these was the project's second single, the Brad Paisley duet "Freedom Was a Highway". "Boy Gets a Truck" was previously recorded by Australian country singer Keith Urban on his 2016 album Ripcord. Further collaborators in the full album include Monica, Babyface, and Pitbull. In collaboration with the album, Allen also began a publishing company also called Bettie James, to which his bass guitarist Tate Howell has been signed.

== Critical reception ==
Stephen Thomas Erlewine of AllMusic rated the extended play version three out of five stars, writing that "there are tips of the hat to his forefathers, a slight nod to hip-hop, some partying, a lot of ballads, and it's all unified by Allen's nimble navigating of the byways separating country, pop, and R&B." Matt Bjorke of Roughstock gave the whole album a positive review, writing that "It might be an unexpected turn to make for an artist making only their second full-length album, but it is an unexpected turn that actually cements what I’ve thought of Jimmie Allen since I first got a chance to hear and see him play: The man is a superstar."

== Bettie James (extended play) track listing ==
No.	Title	Writer(s)	Featured artist	Length
1.	"Good Times Roll"	Jimmie Allen; Nelly; Zach Kale	Nelly	2:38
2.	"Drunk and I Miss You"	Tommy Cecil; Lauren Larue; Matt McGinn	Mickey Guyton	2:47
3.	"Made for These"	Allen; Riley Biederer; Rob Grimaldi	Tim McGraw	3:45
4.	"Freedom Was a Highway"	Allen; Ash Bowers; Matt Rogers	Brad Paisley	3:32
5.	"Why Things Happen"	Allen; Cary Barlowe; Brandon Day; Tate Howell	Charley Pride and Darius Rucker	3:16
6.	"When This Is Over"	Kale; Jon Nite; Laura Veltz	Tauren Wells, Rita Wilson, and The Oak Ridge Boys	3:41
7.	"This Is Us"	Noah Cyrus; Tyler Hubbard; Dernst Emille II; Ilsey Juber; Jordan Schmidt	Noah Cyrus	3:25

== Bettie James Gold Edition track listing ==
No.	Title	Writer(s)	Featured Artist	Length
1.	"Get Country"	Jimmie Allen; Vinny Venditto; Edward Martin; Walter G. Morgan; Christopher Doyle; Leo Brooks; Armando Christian Perez	LoCash	03:54
2.	"Home Sweet Hometown"	Craig Wiseman; Jake Scherer; James McNair	Lanco	03:50
3.	"Flavor"	Phil Bentley; Taylor Bird; Molly Kate Kestner; Teemu Brunila; Antti Riihimäki; Perez; Allen; Victoria Cristina Lopez	Pitbull, Vikina, and Teamwork	02:57
4.	"Somebody"	Allen; Sean Smalls; Sam Sumner; David Breland	Breland and Lathan Warwick	02:54
5.	"Pray"	Jesse Frasure; Sean Maxwell Douglas; Michael Pollack	Monica and Little Big Town	03:34
6.	"Boy Gets a Truck"	Bowers; Aaron Scherz	Keith Urban	03:43
7.	"Livin' Man"	James Scheffer; Michael Wayne Atha; Venditto; Martin; Caleb Lovely; Allen; Doyle; Morgan Griffin	Neon Union	03:27
8.	"Tequila Talkin'"	Lee Newell; Philip James Bentley; Taylor Bird; Mitch James	Lindsay Ell and Teamwork	03:19
9.	"Forever"	Allen; Kenneth B. Edmonds; Ashley Gorley	Babyface	04:10
10.	"Good Times Roll"		Nelly	02:39
11.	"Drunk and I Miss You"		Mickey Guyton	02:48
12.	"Made for These"		Tim McGraw	03:46
13.	"Freedom Was a Highway"		Brad Paisley	03:33
14.	"Why Things Happen"		Charley Pride and Darius Rucker	03:17
15.	"When This Is Over"		Tauren Wells, Rita Wilson, and The Oak Ridge Boys	03:42
16.	"This Is Us"		Noah Cyrus	03:26
