= And It's Still Alright =

Studio album by Nathaniel Rateliff
- Released: February 14, 2020
- Studios: National Freedom (Cottage Grove, Oregon); Broken Creek (Littleton, Colorado); Crown Lane Studios (Denver)
- Genre: Folk
- Length: 42:13
- Labels: Stax; Concord
- Producers: Patrick Meese; James Barone; Nathaniel Rateliff

Nathaniel Rateliff chronology
Tearing at the Seams (2018)	And It's Still Alright (2020)	The Future (2021)

And It's Still Alright is the third studio album by American singer-songwriter Nathaniel Rateliff. It was released on February 14, 2020, via Stax Records. It is his first solo album in seven years since 2013's Falling Faster Than You Can Run. The record garnered a generally positive reception but critics were mixed on Rateliff's musicianship and overall performance.

== Background ==
The album, Rateliff's first solo album since 2013, was written during a difficult time in his life. Rateliff had recently gotten divorced, and friend and producer Richard Swift suddenly died. The album was written as a tribute to Swift.

== Critical reception ==
Professional ratings
Aggregate scores
Source	Rating
Metacritic	68/100
Review scores
Source	Rating
AllMusic	3.5/5 stars
Exclaim!	8/10
The Guardian	3/5 stars
Pitchfork	5.0/10
PopMatters	8/10 stars
Rolling Stone	3/5 stars

And It's Still Alright received generally positive reviews from music critics. At Metacritic, which assigns a normalized rating out of 100 to reviews from mainstream critics, the album received an average score of 68, based on 11 reviews.

Scott Roos of Exclaim! called it "a slow burn that requires multiple listens in order to fully process and appreciate its artistry", concluding that: "It's a late night listening record set in the candlelit environment of the human psyche and a worthy followup to Nathaniel's Falling Faster Than You Can Run." Timothy Monger of AllMusic gave note of the album utilizing a balance between "tender introspection and a playful sense of confidence" throughout the track listing, saying that "Time Stands" and the title track came across like a retreat to his previous solo record, but praised the trio of "All or Nothing," "Expecting to Lose," and "Tonight #2" for mixing Rateliff's "Night Sweats swagger" with "the poetic savvy of early-'70s Harry Nilsson and Leonard Cohen albums" and the opener "What a Drag" for showcasing "his prowess as an instrumentalist", concluding that "While And It's Still Alright is nearly worth it for those four tracks alone, the quieter folk-based songs have their place, too, and provide the contrast that better reflects life's ups and downs."

Rolling Stone's Jon Dolan wrote that: "In the end, what could be an album of well-earned indulgence ends up being as much about reaching outward than burrowing inward, rendering deep personal suffering with a humane light touch. And It's Still Alright the heartening sound of music pulling him through his pain, and, hopefully, past it into something like solace." Michael Hann of The Guardian felt the record was filled with "half-finished" songs that carried "placeholder" ideas that were never replaced, but gave praise to the closer "Rush On" for its "subdued, sepulchral arrangement" and featuring "Rateliff's most extravagant vocal performance" that capture grief and mourning on music. Stephen Thomas Erlewine, writing for Pitchfork, was critical of Rateliff's attempts at capturing Nilsson's artistry with "doggedly earnest" and authentic musicianship, saying the album "backslides to the gormless balladeering" of his debut In Memory of Loss and repels listeners with his "slurred, mangled phrasing" of his lyrics, concluding that: "With the Night Sweats, he's elevated with grit and muscle, but strumming solo on And It's Still Alright, he gets bogged down in a melancholy murk."

== Track listing ==
All tracks are written by Nathaniel Rateliff.

And It's Still Alright track listing
No.	Title	Length
1.	"What a Drag"	3:34
2.	"And It's Still Alright"	3:55
3.	"All or Nothing"	5:01
4.	"Expecting to Lose"	3:54
5.	"Tonight No. 2"	5:04
6.	"Mavis"	4:12
7.	"You Need Me"	3:30
8.	"Time Stands"	3:52
9.	"Kissing Our Friends"	3:03
10.	"Rush On"	6:08
Total length:		42:13

== Personnel ==
Credits adapted from the album's liner notes.

- Nathaniel Rateliff – vocals, acoustic guitar, slide guitar, electric guitar, bass, congas
- Patrick Meese – engineering, mixing, drums, percussion, vibraphone, bass, keyboards, piano, background vocals, theravox, synths
- Elijah Thomson – bass ("What a Drag", "All or Nothing")
- Luke Mossman – electric guitar ("What a Drag", "Time Stands")
- Daniel Creamer – organ ("And It's Still Alright"), mellotron, piano ("All or Nothing")
- Eric Swanson – pedal steel ("And It's Still Alright", "Mavis")
- James Barone – engineering, mixing, noise synth ("All or Nothing")
- Cat Martino – background vocals ("Mavis")
- Elizabeth Ziman – background vocals ("Mavis")
- Joanna Schubert – background vocals ("Mavis")
- Kelly Winrich – additional recording on "Mavis" (The Cave)
- Joshua Block – additional recording on "Rush On" (Niles City Sound)
- Chris Colbert – mastering (Numberstation)
- Rett Rogers – photography, design
- Emily Philpott – design

== Charts ==
Chart performance for And It's Still Alright
Chart (2020)	Peak position
Belgian Albums (Ultratop Flanders)	14
Belgian Albums (Ultratop Wallonia)	64
Canadian Albums (Billboard)	82
Dutch Albums (Album Top 100)	90
Scottish Albums (Official Charts)	7
Spanish Albums (PROMUSICAE)	72
Swiss Albums (Schweizer Hitparade)	24
UK Albums (Official Charts)	63
US Billboard 200	78
US Top Rock Albums (Billboard)	5
