= South of Here =

2024 studio album by Nathaniel Rateliff & the Night Sweats

Studio album by Nathaniel Rateliff & the Night Sweats
- Released: June 28, 2024
- Studio: Broken Creek Studio (Colorado); Sonic Ranch (Texas)
- Genre: Soul; rock
- Length: 36:42
- Label: Stax
- Producer: Brad Cook

Nathaniel Rateliff & the Night Sweats chronology
The Future (2021)	South of Here (2024)

South of Here is the fourth studio album by American rock band Nathaniel Rateliff & the Night Sweats. It was released on June 28, 2024, by Stax Records. The album was produced by Brad Cook and all songs were written by Nathaniel Rateliff.

== Background ==
Nathaniel Rateliff wrote and recorded the album with his band, the Night Sweats, in two different places: his own studio, Broken Creek, and Sonic Ranch in Texas. According to a note written by Rateliff, the songs explore his "anxiety, insecurity, and also stories of [his] life". He also notes on how Brad Cook inspired him to focus more on writing about what was happening in his life, allowing him to develop more personal works.

== Singles ==
The album's lead single "Heartless" was released on April 19, 2024. The song explores the challenges of life, and Rateliff's optimism to find the strength to overcome his challenges. The song peaked at number 1 on the Adult Alternative Airplay chart.

=== Promotional singles ===
The album's first promotional single "David and Goliath" was released on May 17, 2024, followed by "Get Used to the Night" on June 7, 2024.

== Critical reception ==
Professional ratings
Aggregate scores
Source	Rating
Metacritic	78/100
Review scores
Source	Rating
AllMusic	4/5 stars
Classic Rock Magazine	7/10
Glide Magazine	4/5 stars
Mojo	4/5 stars
Paste Magazine	6.7/10
Rolling Stone	3.5/4 stars
Uncut	4/5 stars

Upon its release, South of Here received primarily positive reviews. At Metacritic, which assigns a normalized rating out of 100 based on reviews from mainstream publications, the album received an average score of 78 based on 8 reviews, indicating "generally favorable reviews".

Reviewing the album for AllMusic, Timothy Monger wrote that, "Rateliff leads his crew through a panoply of '70s-touched roots rock, delivered with warmth, sincerity, and occasional bursts of grit. Even amid its themes of anxiety and overcoming trauma, South of Here manages to stay buoyant, and at times playful."

== Track listing ==
All tracks are written by Nathaniel Rateliff.

No.	Title	Length
1.	"David and Goliath"	3:15
2.	"Heartless"	3:18
3.	"Remember I Was a Dancer"	4:00
4.	"Get Used to the Night"	3:23
5.	"South of Here"	3:07
6.	"Everybody Wants Something"	3:11
7.	"Center of Me"	4:04
8.	"Cars in the Desert"	2:56
9.	"I Would Like to Heal"	3:54
10.	"Call Me (Whatever You Like)"	3:00
11.	"Time Makes Fools of Us All"	2:34
Total length:		36:42

== Personnel ==
Musicians

- Nathaniel Rateliff – vocals, piano, electric guitar, acoustic guitar, slide guitar, banjo, art direction
- Luke Mossman – guitar, pedal steel
- Joseph Pope III – bass
- Mark Shusterman – Hammond B3, piano, muted piano
- Patrick Meese – drums, keyboards, piano, Omnichord
- Daniel Hardaway – trumpet
- Jeff Dazey – tenor saxophone
- Matt Douglas – additional tenor saxophone
- Andreas Wild – baritone saxophone, bass clarinet
- Phil Cook – Dobro, piano

Additional roles

- Brad Cook – production
- Paul Voran – mixing, engineering
- Mario Ramirez – assistant engineering
- Mark Anderson – additional assistant engineering
- Gerardo Ordonez – additional engineering and horns (tracks 5, 7)
- Chris Colbert – mastering
- Rett Rogers – art direction, photography
- Clay Condor – exterior layout
- Telepath Design – interior layout

== Charts ==
Chart performance for South of Here
Chart (2024)	Peak position
Belgian Albums (Ultratop Flanders)	142
Scottish Albums (OCC)	24
Swiss Albums (Schweizer Hitparade)	90
UK Americana Albums (OCC)	8
UK Album Downloads (OCC)	39
US Billboard 200	145
US Top Album Sales (Billboard)	12
US Americana/Folk Albums (Billboard)	16
US Top Alternative Albums (Billboard)	19
US Top Current Album Sales (Billboard)	12
US Independent Albums (Billboard)	23
US Vinyl Albums (Billboard)	7
