= Freedom Was a Highway =

Single by Jimmie Allen and Brad Paisley

from the album Bettie James Gold Edition
- Released: February 1, 2021
- Genre: Country rock
- Length: 3:32
- Label: Stoney Creek
- Songwriters: Ash Bowers; Jimmie Allen; Matt Rogers
- Producers: Ash Bowers; Jimmie Allen

Jimmie Allen singles chronology
| "This Is Us" (2020) | "Freedom Was a Highway" (2021) | "Down Home" (2022) |

Brad Paisley singles chronology
| "No I in Beer" (2020) | "Freedom Was a Highway" (2021) | "City of Music" (2021) |

Music video
- "Freedom Was A Highway" on YouTube

"Freedom Was a Highway" is a song recorded by American country music singers Jimmie Allen and Brad Paisley, released on February 1, 2021, as the second single from Allen's second studio album Bettie James Gold Edition. Allen co-wrote the song with Matt Rogers and Ash Bowers, and co-produced it with the latter.

== Background ==
Allen and Paisley revealed on The Bobby Bones Show that the idea for the duet "was born after a hangout with Allen, Paisley, Darius Rucker and Tim McGraw".

Allen also commented: "When I was writing this song with my co-writers, I imagined myself driving down my favorite roads in Delaware. This song takes me back to simpler moments such as an innocent, childhood crush on the next-door neighbor or feeling freedom in the wind as you drive with the windows down. I've loved this song from the creation." Paisley said: "I was honored when Allen asked me to join him on the song. It's a magical combination – it doesn't sound like a typical record for me at all and when I come in, I try my best not to ruin Jimmie's song, I use my guitar to make a record sort of sound like I'm on it even before you hear me sing, and I love this guitar solo. I'm really proud to be a part of 'Freedom Was A Highway' and I'm excited for people to hear it."

== Critical reception ==
Tom Roland of Billboard commented "Freedom Was a Highway" has a yearning, driving power that would fit the soundtrack of a 1980s coming-of-age movie.

== Music video ==
The music video was released on July 29, 2021, co-directed by Allen and Christopher Beyrooty.

== Chart performance ==
"Freedom Was a Highway" reached number one on the Billboard Country Airplay chart dated February 19, 2022, becoming Allen's third number one single on that chart, and Paisley's twentieth, as well as his first since "Perfect Storm" in January 2015. This accomplishment also tied Paisley with Brooks & Dunn and Toby Keith for the tenth most number one singles on the chart.

== Charts ==
=== Weekly charts ===
Weekly chart performance for "Freedom Was a Highway"
| Chart (2021–2022) | Peak position |
|---|---|
| Australia Country Hot 50 (TMN) | 3 |
| Canada Country (Billboard) | 21 |
| US Billboard Hot 100 | 45 |
| US Country Airplay (Billboard) | 1 |
| US Hot Country Songs (Billboard) | 5 |

=== Year-end charts ===
2021 year-end chart performance for "Freedom Was a Highway"
| Chart (2021) | Position |
|---|---|
| US Country Airplay (Billboard) | 48 |
| US Hot Country Songs (Billboard) | 70 |

2022 year-end chart performance for "Freedom Was a Highway"
| Chart (2022) | Position |
|---|---|
| US Country Airplay (Billboard) | 39 |
| US Hot Country Songs (Billboard) | 54 |
| US Radio Songs (Billboard) | 69 |

== Certifications ==
| Region | Certification | Certified units/sales |
|---|---|---|
| United States (RIAA) | Platinum | 1,000,000^{‡} |
^{‡} Sales+streaming figures based on certification alone.
