= CMT Crossroads =

- Country of origin: United States
- No. of seasons: 16
- No. of episodes: 82 (List of episodes)

Production
- Running time: 60 minutes

Original release
- Network: CMT
- Release: January 13, 2002 – June 13, 2024

CMT Crossroads is an American television program broadcast on Country Music Television (CMT) that pairs country music artists with musicians from other music genres such as alternative rock, pop, R&B, rock, soul and more, frequently trading off performing one another's songs, one cover song and also dueting on some numbers.

== History ==
Crossroads premiered on January 13, 2002, and there have been seventy-six episodes to date.
