= Nathaniel Rateliff & the Night Sweats (album) =

Studio album by Nathaniel Rateliff & the Night Sweats
- Released: August 21, 2015
- Genres: Rock; soul
- Length: 38:13
- Labels: Stax; Concord
- Producer: Richard Swift

Nathaniel Rateliff & the Night Sweats chronology
Falling Faster Than You Can Run (2013)	Nathaniel Rateliff & the Night Sweats (2015)	Tearing at the Seams (2018)

Singles from Nathaniel Rateliff & the Night Sweats
- 1. "S.O.B." Released: 2015

Nathaniel Rateliff & the Night Sweats is the debut studio album by Nathaniel Rateliff & the Night Sweats, released by Stax on August 21, 2015.

== Critical reception ==
Professional ratings
Aggregate scores
Source	Rating
Metacritic	73/100
Review scores
Source	Rating
AllMusic	3.5/5 stars
The Guardian	3/5 stars
Paste	8.1/10
Rolling Stone	3/5 stars

Nathaniel Rateliff & the Night Sweats garnered generally positive reception from music critics. At Metacritic, they assign a "weighted average" score to selected independent ratings and reviews, and based upon twelve reviews, the album has a Metascore of 73 meaning that it received "generally favorable" reviews. At Rolling Stone, Chuck Arnold rated the album three stars out of five, stating that "Rateliff hasn't completely forgotten his folkie past: The wistful "Wasting Time" shows that he can still kill you softly." Thom Jurek of AllMusic rated the album three-and-a-half stars out of five, writing that "Rateliff's world-weary, deeply expressive tenor and lyrics place him on a different level than any of the current crew of revivalists." At The Guardian, Harriet Gibsone rated the album three stars out of five, stating that "Aside from Snake [sic], which brings to mind Paolo Nutini slumped at the back of a strip club, the album is full of the ghosts of songwriting greats like Otis Redding, Chuck Berry and Van Morrison, and sounds like it should establish Rateliff as the breakneck bar brawler of the new soul movement."

== Track listing ==
All tracks are written by Nathaniel Rateliff

No.	Title	Length
1.	"I Need Never Get Old"	4:13
2.	"Howling at Nothing"	3:09
3.	"Trying So Hard Not to Know"	2:50
4.	"I've Been Failing"	3:00
5.	"S.O.B."	4:07
6.	"Wasting Time"	3:44
7.	"Thank You"	3:17
8.	"Look It Here"	3:03
9.	"Shake"	3:38
10.	"I'd Be Waiting"	3:40
11.	"Mellow Out"	3:32
Total length:		38:13

== Personnel ==
- Derek Banach – group member
- Rick Benjamin – group member
- Leah Concialdi – group member
- Eric D. Johnson – group member
- Nick Krier – group member
- Matt Marshall – A&R
- Patrick Meese – engineer, group member, horn engineer
- The Night Sweats – primary artist
- Russ Pahl – group member
- Emily Philpott – package design
- Joseph Pope III – bass
- Nathaniel Rateliff – composer, group member, primary artist
- Rett Rogers – photography
- Starett Rogers – group member
- Glenn Ross – band photo
- Adam Shaffner – group member
- Mark Shusterman – group member
- Richard Swift – engineer, group member, mixing, producer
- TW Walsh – mastering
- Wesley Watkins – group member
- Andreas Wild – group member

== Charts ==
=== Weekly charts ===
Chart (2015–17)	Peak position
Australian Albums (ARIA)	19
Belgian Albums (Ultratop Flanders)	3
Belgian Albums (Ultratop Wallonia)	192
Canadian Albums (Billboard)	7
Dutch Albums (Album Top 100)	20
French Albums (SNEP)	94
Irish Albums (IRMA)	26
Swiss Albums (Schweizer Hitparade)	11
UK Albums (Official Charts)	27
US Billboard 200	17
US Top Alternative Albums (Billboard)	2
US Top Rock Albums (Billboard)	4
US Folk Albums (Billboard)	1

=== Year-end charts ===
Chart (2015)	Position
US Top Rock Albums (Billboard)	51
Chart (2016)	Position
Belgian Albums (Ultratop Flanders)	14
Swiss Albums (Schweizer Hitparade)	50
US Billboard 200	132
US Top Rock Albums (Billboard)	11
Chart (2017)	Position
Belgian Albums (Ultratop Flanders)	45

== Certifications ==
Region	Certification	Certified units/sales
Belgium (BRMA)	Gold	15,000^{*}
Canada (Music Canada)	Platinum	80,000^{‡}
Switzerland (IFPI Switzerland)	Platinum	20,000^{‡}
United Kingdom (BPI)	Silver	66,928
United States (RIAA)	Gold	500,000^{‡}
^{*} Sales figures based on certification alone.^{‡} Sales+streaming figures based on certification alone.
