= Nathaniel Rateliff =

American singer (born 1978)

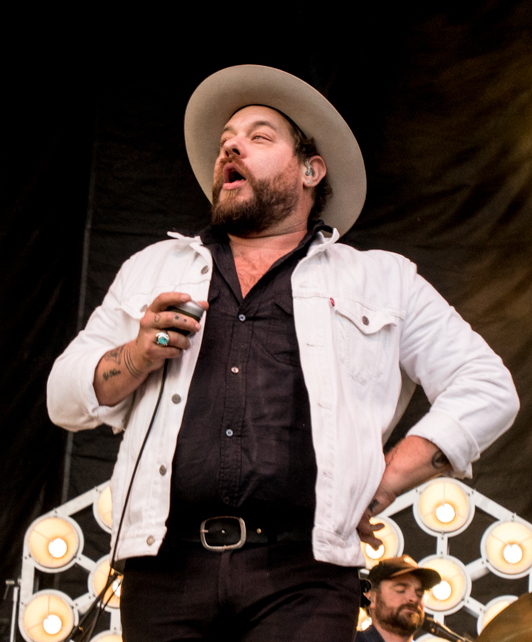
- Rateliff in 2018

Background information
- Born: Nathaniel David Rateliff; October 7, 1978 (age 47); St. Louis, Missouri, U.S
- Origin: Hermann, Missouri and Denver, Colorado
- Genres: Soul; gospel; folk rock; blues rock; cowpunk; Americana; blue-eyed soul
- Years active: 2002–present
- Labels: Stax; Rounder; Decca; Mod y Vi
- Website: nathanielrateliff.com

Nathaniel David Rateliff (born October 7, 1978) is an American singer and songwriter based in Denver, Colorado, whose influences are described as folk, Americana and vintage rhythm & blues. Rateliff has performed with a backing band called the Night Sweats for an R&B side project he formed in 2013. He has released three solo albums, two solo EPs, and one album as Nathaniel Rateliff & the Wheel.

== Life and career ==
Rateliff was born in St. Louis, Missouri on October 7, 1978. He grew up in Hermann, Missouri, learning to play the drums at age seven, often performing at church, where he also assisted his mother with writing hymns. His father died in a car crash in 1993, leaving behind a record collection which Rateliff would eventually discover. In 1996, Rateliff traveled to Denver on a missionary trip, returning to Hermann after. Later, he and his friend and lifetime collaborator Joseph Pope III left Hermann for Denver permanently, forming the band Born in the Flood.

=== 2002–2008: Born in the Flood ===
In 2002, Rateliff formed Born in the Flood, quickly garnering a large following in Denver and headlining local festivals like the Westword Music Showcase. In February 2007, Born in the Flood released their first full-length album, If This Thing Should Spill. Despite increasing success with Born in the Flood, Rateliff turned down an offer from Roadrunner Records, and shifted his focus to a more stripped-down, solo effort, playing somber, singer-songwriter content under his name and "Nathaniel Rateliff & the Wheel".

=== 2007–2014: Nathaniel Rateliff & the Wheel ===
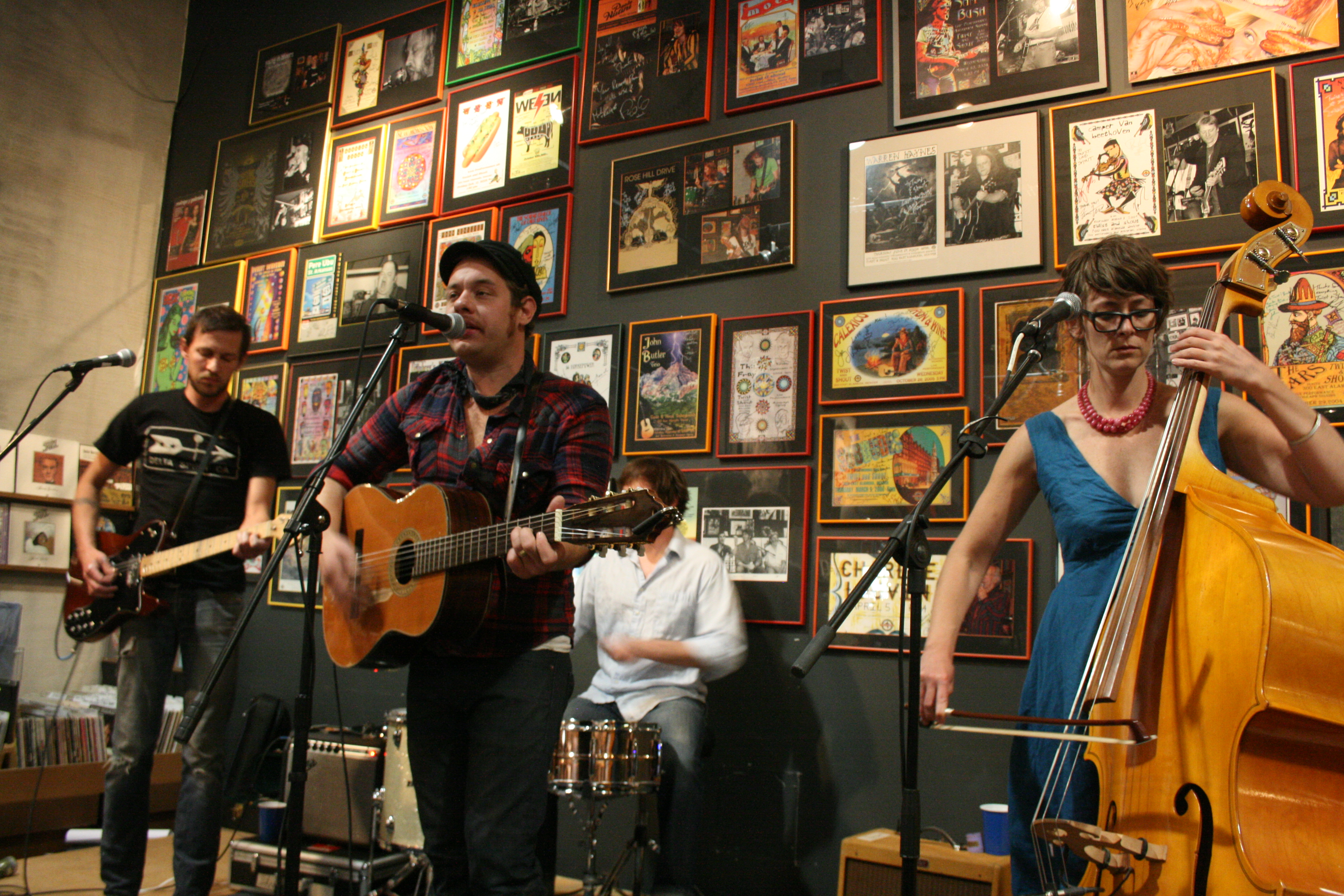
Rateliff performing in Colorado in May 2010

In 2007, while still performing with Born in the Flood, Rateliff began recording and performing more personal, somber content both solo and with BitF bandmate Joseph Pope III (bass/guitar/vibes/organ/harmonica). The project expanded with more live performances, adding Julie Davis (upright bass/vocals), Carrie Beeder (organ/violin), James Han (keys/vibes), and Ben Desoto (drums/flute). Shortly after the breakup of Born in the Flood, Rateliff released Desire and Dissolving Men on Public Service Records. Nathaniel Rateliff then released In Memory of Loss in the USA on Rounder Records in May 2010, and then in the UK on Decca in March 2011. In Memory of Loss was recorded with producer Brian Deck (Iron & Wine). On September 17, 2013, Rateliff released Falling Faster Than You Can Run on Mod y Vi Records. On the same day he set out on a tour with The Lumineers and Dr. Dog, in support of the album.

=== 2013–present: Nathaniel Rateliff & the Night Sweats ===
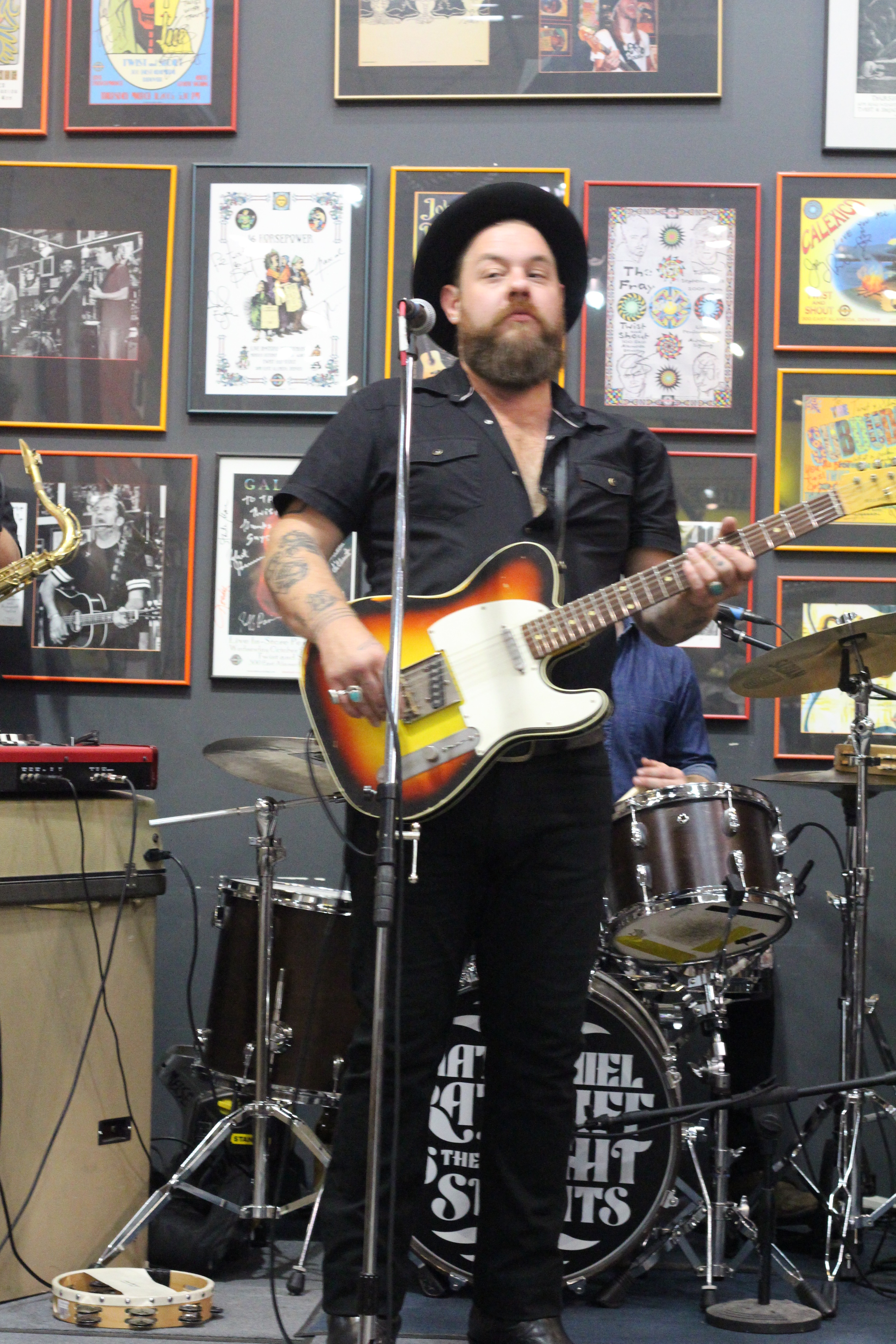
Rateliff and the Night Sweats performing in Colorado in August 2015

Beginning in 2013, while still performing and recording with earlier solo and group projects, Rateliff embarked on a more upbeat, soulful sound with longtime collaborator Joseph Pope III and other collaborators in shows around Denver and Boulder. On June 24, 2015, the self-titled release of Nathaniel Rateliff & the Night Sweats via Stax Records was announced with the lead single being "S.O.B.". The Night Sweats feature Joseph Pope III (bass), Mark Shusterman (keyboards) and Patrick Meese (drums). Other band members include Luke Mossman (guitar), Wesley Watkins (trumpet), and Andy Wild (saxophone). According to the Los Angeles Times, this was "an album Rateliff made as a last-ditch effort before throwing in the towel on his music career, only to see it go viral and turn into a runaway hit."

In November 2016, he released the 8-track EP A Little More From... Nathaniel Rateliff & the Night Sweats released a new album, titled Tearing at the Seams, on March 9, 2018. After spending a week recording 18 songs with his band, Rateliff was not content and returned to the studio for five days with his band's rhythm section and three more days with the horn section, producing seven to eight new songs he felt were "appropriate, the right tempo and the right mood". The band shared the record's lead single, "You Worry Me". Produced by Richard Swift and being offered in 12-track standard and 14-track deluxe editions, the band assembled in Rodeo, New Mexico for the initial writing and recording sessions for the album.

"You Worry Me" is built on an insistent, swaggering pulse, and powered by echo-heavy guitars and throbbing bass and drums, with horns joining midway through as Rateliff sings a message of support and encouragement to someone who appears to be losing faith.

— Randy Lewis, Los Angeles Times

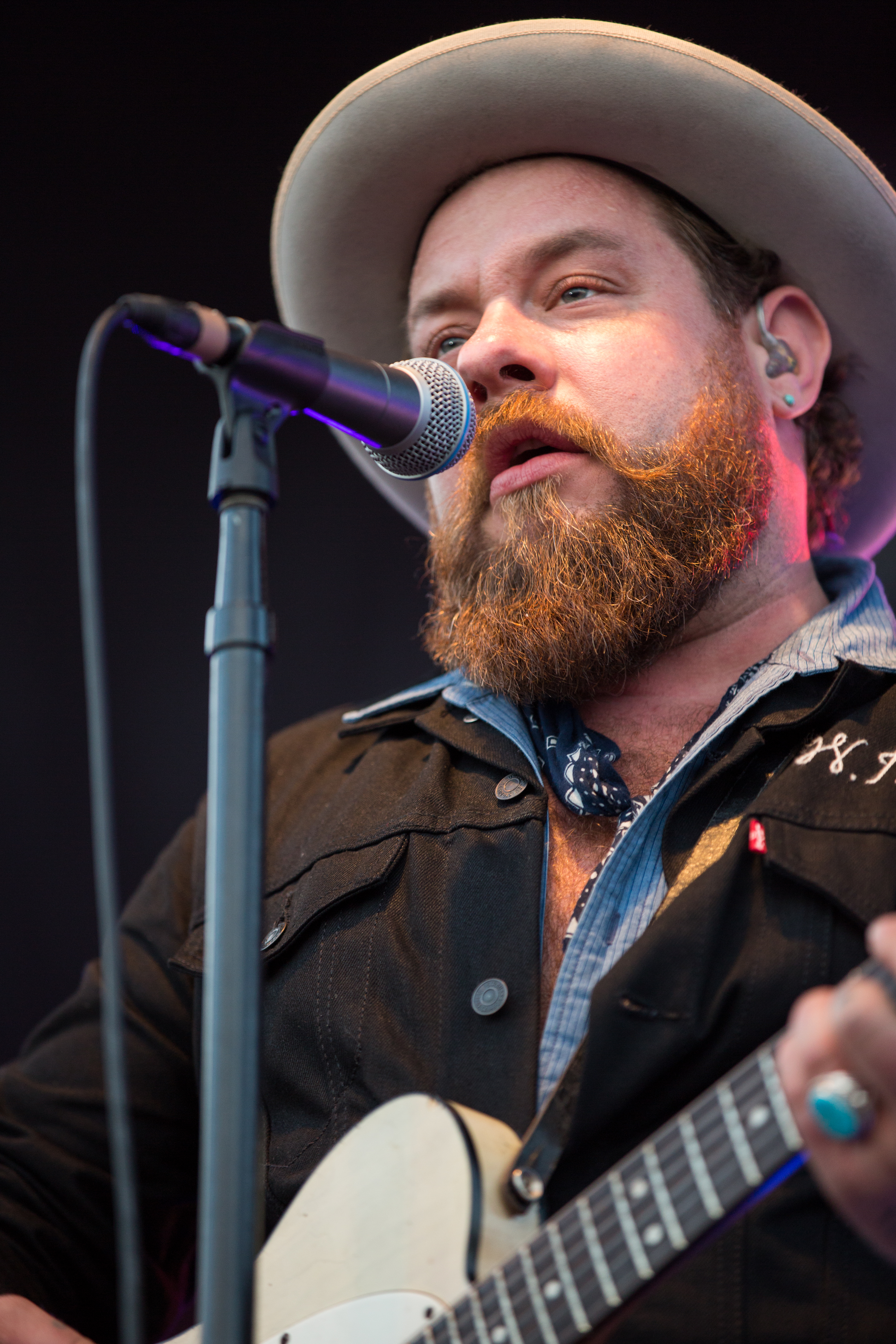
Rateliff performing at the 2017 High Water Festival

In February 2018, "You Worry Me", the lead single from Tearing at the Seams, their second studio album, hit number one on the Adult Alternative Songs charts. It would later hit the top 10 on the Alternative Songs chart in June 2018. Tearing at the Seams was released on March 9, 2018. The album debuted at number 11 on the Billboard 200 for the week of March 24, 2018, and debuted on the Alternative Albums chart at number 5.

In August 2019, Nathaniel Rateliff & The Night Sweats launched a limited cannabis cartridge line titled "Nightstache Collection" in collaboration with Willie's Reserve. The first release was the strain AJ's Cherry AK. The band developed a friendship with Willie Nelson when they met at Farm Aid in 2016.

In November 2019, Rateliff announced a solo tour to support a new solo album via Stax Records. On January 8, 2020, Rateliff announced And It's Still Alright, his first solo album in nearly seven years, which was released February 14 via Stax Records.

Rateliff supported the Bernie Sanders 2020 presidential campaign, and Nathaniel Rateliff & the Night Sweats performed at a campaign rally in Saint Paul, Minnesota.

On December 17, 2020, Rateliff released "Redemption", a new song he wrote for the Apple Original film Palmer. The release came as a surprise to Rateliff's fans, since he did not announce it beforehand.

In early 2021, Rateliff appeared in his first Saturday Night Live performance on February 13. His two-song set included the recently released "Redemption" and "A Little Honey" off of Tearing at the Seams.

On November 5, 2021, Nathaniel Rateliff & The Night Sweats released their third studio album, The Future, via Stax Records. In support of the album, SiriusXM The Spectrum introduced Night Sweats Radio with Nathaniel Rateliff, which debuted October 22, 2021, airing new episodes every Friday. Their fourth studio album, South of Here, was released on Stax Records on June 28, 2024.

== Recognition ==
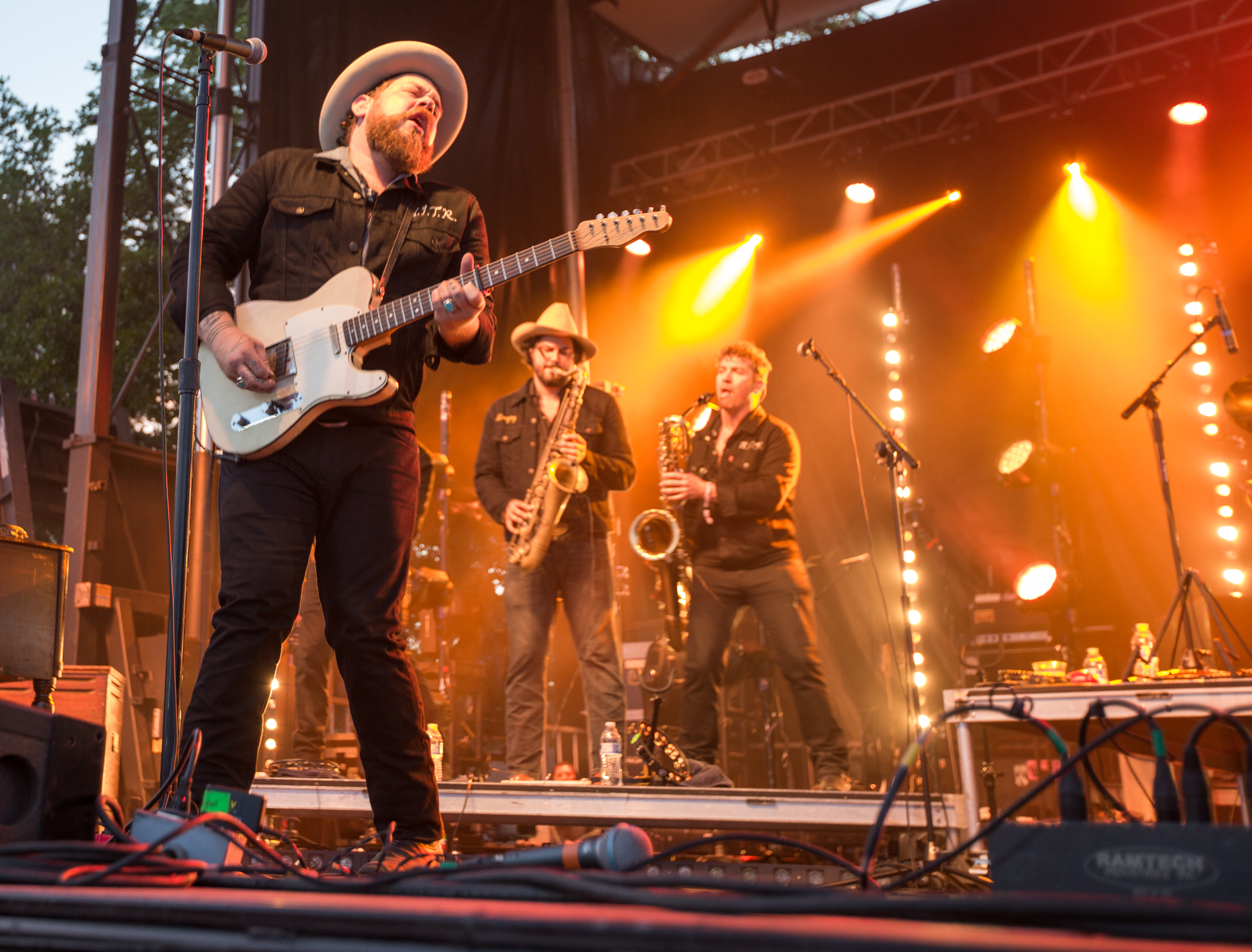
Rateliff performing with the Night Sweats at the 2017 High Water Festival

Rateliff developed a dedicated following within the Denver music community. The New York Times dubbed him a Denver local folk-pop hero. Spin praised his "massive, alluring" voice. Billboard dubbed the unsigned singer-songwriter a "must hear." This wave of acclaim led to a solo tour opening for The Fray, which brought his work to the attention of national and international audiences. Rateliff was featured on the late-night music television series Later... with Jools Holland on BBC in 2011. Rateliff has also shared the stage with artists such as Bon Iver, Mason Jennings, Iron & Wine, Ben Howard, Michael Kiwanuka, The Low Anthem, Mumford & Sons, Laura Marling and Rosanne Cash, and Joe Walsh, among others, including The Lumineers in Denver for the United States presidential election debates, 2012. On August 5, 2015, Nathaniel Rateliff & The Night Sweats made their late-night television debut on The Tonight Show Starring Jimmy Fallon. The band played Ontario's Wayhome festival and Austin City Limits in 2016. Nathaniel Rateliff & The Night Sweats were the featured musical guests on Saturday Night Live on February 13, 2021. Rateliff & The Night Sweats performed their song "Face Down in the Moment" on The Tonight Show. October 3, 2026 Nathaniel Rateliff performed solo at the Power to the People festival in Columbia, Maryland at Merriweather Park.

== Discography ==
=== Albums ===
==== Studio albums ====
As solo artist

List of albums, with selected chart positions
Title	Album details	Peak chart positions									
Title	Album details	US	US Folk	BEL (FL)	BEL (WA)	CAN	NLD	SCO	SPA	SWI	UK
Desire and Dissolving Men (as Nathaniel Rateliff & the Wheel)	Released: November 6, 2007; Label: Public Service Records; Format(s): CD, LP, streaming	—	—	—	—	—	—	—	—	—	—
In Memory of Loss	Released: May 4, 2010; Re-released: May 19, 2017; Label: Rounder (US), Decca (UK); Format(s): CD, LP, streaming	—	—	—	—	—	—	—	—	—	—
Falling Faster Than You Can Run	Released: September 17, 2013; Label: Mod y Vi Records; Format(s): CD, LP, digital download, streaming	—	—	187	—	—	—	—	—	—	—
And It's Still Alright	Released: February 14, 2020; Label: Stax; Format(s): CD, LP, digital download, streaming	78	2	14	64	82	90	7	72	24	63
"—" denotes a recording that did not chart or was not released in that territory.

As Nathaniel Rateliff & the Night Sweats

List of albums, with selected chart positions
Title	Album details	Peak chart positions										Certifications
Title	Album details	US	AUS	BEL (FL)	BEL (WA)	CAN	FRA	IRL	NLD	SWI	UK	Certifications
Nathaniel Rateliff & the Night Sweats	Released: August 21, 2015; Label: Stax; Format(s): CD, LP, digital download, streaming	17	19	3	192	7	94	23	20	11	27	RIAA: Gold; BEA: Gold; BPI: Silver; IFPI SWI: Platinum; MC: Platinum
Tearing at the Seams	Released: March 9, 2018; Label: Stax; Format(s): CD, LP, digital download, streaming	11	47	7	64	12	—	60	78	34	33	MC: Gold
The Future	Released: November 5, 2021; Label: Stax; Format(s): CD, LP, digital download, streaming	165	—	116	77	—	—	—	—	—	69	
South of Here	Released: June 28, 2024; Label: Stax; Format(s): CD, LP, digital download, streaming	145	—	142	—	—	—	—	—	90	— (Note: South of Here did not enter the UK Albums Chart, but peaked at number 27 on the UK Album Sales Chart.)	
"—" denotes a recording that did not chart or was not released in that territory.

==== Live albums ====
As solo artist

List of albums, with selected chart positions
Title	Album details	Peak chart positions	
Title	Album details	US Sales	UK Amer.
Red Rocks 2020	Released: July 16, 2021; Label: Stax; Format(s): CD, LP, digital download, streaming	59	22

As Nathaniel Rateliff & the Night Sweats

List of albums, with selected chart positions
Title	Album details	Peak chart positions			
Title	Album details	US Folk	US Rock Sales	BEL (FL)	UK Amer.
Live at Red Rocks	Released: November 10, 2017; Label: Stax; Format(s): CD, LP, digital download, streaming	18	27	121	22

=== EPs ===
==== As solo artist ====
List of albums, with selected chart positions
Title	EP details
Shroud EP	Released: April 11, 2011; Label: Decca; Format(s): LP
Closer	Released: January 27, 2015; Label: Mod y Vi; Format(s): LP, digital download, streaming

==== As Nathaniel Rateliff & the Night Sweats ====
List of albums, with selected chart positions
Title	EP details	Peak chart positions							
Title	EP details	US	US Alt.	US Folk	US Rock	AUS Hit.	BEL (FL) Mid	UK Amer.	UK Jazz
A Little Something More From...	Released: October 21, 2016; Label: Stax; Format(s): CD, LP, digital download, streaming	149	11	3	21	2	8	8	7
What If I	Released: June 2, 2023; Label: Stax; Format(s): digital download, streaming	—	—	—	—	—	—	—	—
"—" denotes a recording that did not chart or was not released in that territory.

=== Singles ===
==== As solo artist ====
Title	Year	Peak chart positions						Certifications	Album
Title	Year	US DL	US AAA	US Rock	BEL (FL)	BEL (WA)	CAN DL	Certifications	Album
"Early Spring Till"	2010	—	—	—	—	—	—		In Memory of Loss
"You Should've Seen the Other Guy"	2011	—	—	—	—	—	—		In Memory of Loss
"And It's Still Alright"	2020	—	1	33	— (Note: "And It's Still Alright" did not enter the Flanders Ultratop 50, but peaked at number 14 on the Ultratip chart.)	— (Note: "And It's Still Alright" did not enter the Wallonie Ultratop Top 50, but charted as an extra tip on the Wallonie Ultratop Bubbling Under chart.)	—	RIAA: Gold	And It's Still Alright
"What a Drag"	2020	—	—	—	— (Note: "What a Drag" did not enter the Flanders Ultratop Top 50, but charted as an extra tip on the Flanders Ultratop Bubbling Under chart.)	— (Note: "What a Drag" did not enter the Wallonie Ultratop Top 50, but charted as an extra tip on the Wallonie Ultratop Bubbling Under chart.)	—		And It's Still Alright
"Time Stands"	2020	—	6	—	— (Note: "Time Stands" did not enter the Flanders Ultratop Top 50, but charted as an extra tip on the Flanders Ultratop Bubbling Under chart.)	—	—		And It's Still Alright
"Redemption"	2020	21	5	27	— (Note: "Redemption" did not enter the Flanders Ultratop Top 50, but charted as an extra tip on the Flanders Ultratop Bubbling Under chart.)	—	38		Non-album single
"—" denotes a single that did not chart or was not released in that territory.

==== As Nathaniel Rateliff & the Night Sweats ====
Title	Year	Peak chart positions										Certifications	Album
Title	Year	US Bub.	US Rock	BEL (FL)	BEL (WA)	CAN	CAN Rock	IRL	SCO	SWI	UK	Certifications	Album
"Howling at Nothing"	2015	—	—	—	—	—	—	—	—	—	— (Note: "Howling At Nothing" did not enter the UK Singles Chart, but peaked at number 22 on the UK Physical Singles Chart.)		Nathaniel Rateliff & the Night Sweats
"I Need Never Get Old"	2015	—	43	3	— (Note: "I Need Never Get Old" did not enter the Wallonie Ultratop Top 50, but charted as an extra tip on the Wallonie Ultratop Bubbling Under chart.)	—	29	—	—	—	—	RIAA: Gold; BEA: Gold; MC: Gold	Nathaniel Rateliff & the Night Sweats
"Look It Here"	2015	—	— (Note: "Look It Here" did not enter the Rock Songs chart, but peaked at number 50 on the US Rock Airplay chart.)	—	—	—	—	—	—	—	—		Nathaniel Rateliff & the Night Sweats
"S.O.B."	2015	3	8	7	—	36	2	58	98	9	183	RIAA: Platinum; IFPI SWI: Gold; MC: 4× Platinum	Nathaniel Rateliff & the Night Sweats
"Wasting Time"	2016	—	— (Note: "Wasting Time" did not enter the Hot Rock & Alternative Songs chart, but peaked at number 21 on the Adult Alternative Airplay chart.)	—	—	—	—	—	—	—	—		Nathaniel Rateliff & the Night Sweats
"Out on the Weekend"	2016	—	—	— (Note: "Out On The Weekend" did not enter the Flanders Ultratop 50, but peaked at number 6 on the Ultratip chart.)	—	—	—	—	—	—	—		A Little Something More
"Baby, It's Cold Outside"	2017	—	—	— (Note: "Baby, It's Cold Outside" did not enter the Flanders Ultratop Top 50, but charted as an extra tip on the Flanders Ultratop Bubbling Under chart.)	—	—	—	—	—	—	—		Non-album single
"You Worry Me"	2018	—	18	26	— (Note: "You Worry Me" did not enter the Wallonie Ultratop 50, but peaked at number 22 on the Ultratip chart.)	—	1	—	—	—	—	RIAA: Gold; MC: Platinum	Tearing at the Seams
"A Little Honey"	2018	—	— (Note: "A Little Honey" did not enter the Rock Songs chart, but peaked at number 40 on the US Rock Airplay chart.)	— (Note: "A Little Honey" did not enter the Flanders Ultratop Top 50, but charted as an extra tip on the Flanders Ultratop Bubbling Under chart.)	—	—	—	—	—	—	—		Tearing at the Seams
"Coolin' Out" (featuring Lucius)	2018	—	—	— (Note: "Coolin' Out" did not enter the Flanders Ultratop 50, but peaked at number 13 on the Ultratip chart.)	— (Note: "Coolin' Out" did not enter the Wallonie Ultratop Top 50, but charted as an extra tip on the Wallonie Ultratop Bubbling Under chart.)	—	—	—	—	—	—		Tearing at the Seams
"Hey Mama"	2018	—	— (Note: "Hey Mama" did not enter the Rock Songs chart, but peaked at number 35 on the US Rock Airplay chart.)	—	—	—	—	—	—	—	—		Tearing at the Seams
"Say It Louder"	2018	—	—	— (Note: "Say It Louder" did not enter the Flanders Ultratop 50, but peaked at number 32 on the Ultratip chart.)	— (Note: "Say It Louder" did not enter the Wallonie Ultratop Top 50, but charted as an extra tip on the Wallonie Ultratop Bubbling Under chart.)	—	—	—	—	—	—		Tearing at the Seams
"Don't Care Darlin'"	2020	—	— (Note: "Don't Care Darlin'" did not enter the Rock Songs chart, but peaked at number 13 on the Rock Digital Song Sales chart.)	—	—	—	—	—	—	—	—		Fug Yep No. 3
"Survivor"	2021	—	46	—	—	—	2	—	—	—	—		The Future
"Love Don't"	2021	—	—	—	—	—	—	—	—	—	—		The Future
"What If I"	2021	—	—	—	—	—	—	—	—	—	—		The Future
"Face Down in the Moment"	2021	—	— (Note: "Face Down In The Moment" did not enter the Rock Songs chart, but peaked at number 40 on the US Rock Airplay chart.)	—	—	—	—	—	—	—	—		The Future
"I'm on Your Side"	2022	—	— (Note: "I'm On Your Side" did not enter the Hot Rock & Alternative Songs chart, but peaked at number 40 on the Alternative Airplay chart.)	—	—	—	3	—	—	—	—		The Future
"Heartless"	2024	—	— (Note: "Heartless" did not enter the Rock Songs chart, but peaked at number 19 on the US Rock Airplay chart.)	—	—	—	18	—	—	—	—		South of Here
"David and Goliath"	2024	—	—	—	—	—	—	—	—	—	—		South of Here
"Get Used to the Night"	2024	—	—	—	—	—	—	—	—	—	—		South of Here
"Call Me (Whatever You Like)"	2024	—	— (Note: "Call Me (Whatever You Like)" did not enter the Hot Rock & Alternative Songs chart, but peaked at number 31 on the US Rock Airplay chart.)	—	—	—	14	—	—	—	—		South of Here
"South of Here"	2025	—	— (Note: "South of Here" did not enter the Hot Rock & Alternative Songs chart, but peaked at number 31 on the Adult Alternative Airplay chart.)	—	—	—	—	—	—	—	—		South of Here
"—" denotes a single that did not chart or was not released in that territory.

=== Music videos ===
Solo

- "Still Trying" (2014)
- "And It's Still Alright" (2020)
- "What A Drag" (2020)
- "Time Stands" (2020)
- "Mavis" (Live at Red Rocks / September 20, 2020) (2021)
- "Redemption" (2021)
- "Flowers" (with Gregory Alan Isakov) (2025)

as Nathaniel Rateliff & The Night Sweats

- "Look It Here" (2015)
- "Howling at Nothing" (2015)
- "Howling at Nothing" (Director's Cut) (2015)
- "S.O.B." (2015)
- "I Need Never Get Old" (2016)
- "Wasting Time" (2016)
- "A Little Honey" (2018)
- "You Worry Me" (2018)
- "Hey Mama" (2018)
- "Survivor" (2021)
- "Love Don't" (2021)
- "Face Down in the Moment" (2022)
- "Graceland" (w/ Paul Simon) (Live at the Newport Folk Festival) (2022)
- "Get Used to the Night" (2024)
- "Heartless" (2024)
- "South of Here" (2025)
