= Tearing at the Seams =

Studio album by Nathaniel Rateliffe & the Night Sweats
- Released: March 9, 2018
- Genres: Soul; roots rock
- Length: 46:54
- Label: Stax
- Producer: Richard Swift

Nathaniel Rateliffe & the Night Sweats chronology
Nathaniel Rateliff & the Night Sweats (2015)	Tearing at the Seams (2018)	And It's Still Alright (2020)

Professional ratings
Aggregate scores
Source	Rating
AnyDecentMusic?	7.3/10
Metacritic	78/100
Review scores
Source	Rating
AllMusic	3.5/5 stars
The Line of Best Fit	8.5/10
MusicOMH	3.5/5 stars
Paste	7.5/10
PopMatters	8/10

Tearing at the Seams is the second studio album by American band Nathaniel Rateliff & The Night Sweats. It was released on March 9, 2018 under Stax Records.

== Songs ==
=== Singles ===
The single "You Worry Me" was released on January 11, 2018, along with the announcement of the new album. The song charted at Number 1 on Billboard's Canada Rock, number 1 on Adult Alternative Songs, number 18 on Hot Rock & Alternative Songs,

On October 21, 2018, the music video to "A Little Honey" was released. The song charted at Number 2 on Billboard's Adult Alternative Songs, The song was performed live on Jimmy Kimmel Live! on September 6, 2018.

"Hey Mama" was released as a music video on May 9, 2018. The song charted at Number 1 on Billboard's Adult Alternative Songs,

=== Lyrics ===
Rateliff told Vincent Arrieta of The Buffalo News that while he is generally hesitant to divulge the origins and meanings of songs, he did reveal that "Babe I Know" was at least partly inspired by his divorce, saying "I was kind of going through a lot in my personal time and trying to write about that situation and without being too revealing. The words of that whole song [are] sort of like saying goodbye to somebody, but also recognizing that I just wasn't receiving what I really needed – which was to be blown away by somebody and breathless around the person you care about.”

== Critical reception ==
Tearing at the Seams was met with "generally favorable" reviews from critics. At Metacritic, which assigns a weighted average rating out of 100 to reviews from mainstream publications, this release received an average score of 78, based on 11 reviews. Aggregator Album of the Year gave the release a 72 out of 100 based on a critical consensus of 7 reviews.

Stephen Thomas Erlewine of AllMusic said the album "feels very much like a record worked out on the road. It's filled with high-octane grooves and gritty vamps, punctuated by the occasional moment of acoustic reflection. Often, the vibe trumps the songs, which is actually not much of a problem. The Night Sweats know how to re-create classic soul sounds."

== Track listing ==
Tearing at the Seams track listing
No.	Title	Writer(s)	Length
1.	"Shoe Boot"	Nathaniel Rateliff; Mark Shusterman	4:43
2.	"Be There"	Patrick Meese; Nathaniel Rateliff	3:39
3.	"A Little Honey"	Nathaniel Rateliff	3:10
4.	"Say It Louder"	Nathaniel Rateliff	3:23
5.	"Hey Mama"	Nathaniel Rateliff	4:00
6.	"Babe I Know" (featuring Lucius)	Nathaniel Rateliff	3:04
7.	"Intro"	Nathaniel Rateliff	4:19
8.	"Coolin' Out" (featuring Lucius)	Nathaniel Rateliff	4:01
9.	"Baby I Lost My Way, (But I'm Going Home)"	Nathaniel Rateliff	2:55
10.	"You Worry Me"	Nathaniel Rateliff; Luke Mossman	3:34
11.	"Still Out There Running"	Nathaniel Rateliff	4:53
12.	"Tearing at the Seams"	Nathaniel Rateliff	5:13

iTunes Deluxe version
No.	Title	Length
13.	"I'll Be Damned"	2:41
14.	"Boiled Over"	2:30

== Charts ==
=== Weekly charts ===
Chart performance for Tearing at the Seams
Chart (2018)	Peak position
Australian Albums (ARIA)	47
Belgian Albums (Ultratop Flanders)	7
Belgian Albums (Ultratop Wallonia)	64
Canadian Albums (Billboard)	12
Dutch Albums (Album Top 100)	78
German Albums (Offizielle Top 100)	90
Scottish Albums (Official Charts)	13
Swiss Albums (Schweizer Hitparade)	34
UK Albums (Official Charts)	33
UK Americana Albums (Official Charts)	1
US Billboard 200	11
US Top Album Sales (Billboard)	6
US Top Alternative Albums (Billboard)	5
US Americana/Folk Albums (Billboard)	1
US Top Rock Albums (Billboard)	4
US Vinyl Albums (Billboard)	5

=== Year-end charts ===
Year-end chart performance for Tearing at the Seams
Chart (2018)	Position
Belgian Albums (Ultratop Flanders)	79
US Top Rock Albums (Billboard)	88

== Certifications ==
Certifications for Tearing at the Seams
Region	Certification	Certified units/sales
Canada (Music Canada)	Gold	40,000^{‡}
^{‡} Sales+streaming figures based on certification alone.

== Personnel ==
Musicians

- Nathaniel Rateliff – vocals, guitar
- Jeff Dazey – saxophone
- Andreas Wild – saxophone, vocals
- Jess Wolfe – backing vocals
- Mark Shusterman – vocals, piano
- Luke Mossman – guitar
- Joseph Pope III – bass
- Scott Frock – flugelhorn
- Holly Laessig – backing vocals
- Patrick Meese – bass, drums, engineer

Production

- Richard Swift – engineer, producer, vocals
- Christopher Colbert – mastering
- Jamie Mefford – engineer, producer
- Rett Rogers – photography
