= The Driver (Charles Kelley album) =

Studio album by Charles Kelley
- Released: February 5, 2016
- Studio: Shabby Row, Major Bob Studios and Warner Studios (Nashville, Tennessee)
- Genre: Country
- Length: 35:54
- Label: Capitol Nashville
- Producer: Paul Worley

Charles Kelley chronology
The Driver (2016)	Songs for a New Moon (2025)

Singles from The Driver
- 1. "The Driver" Released: October 19, 2015; 2. "Lonely Girl" Released: April 18, 2016

The Driver is the debut solo album by American country music artist Charles Kelley. It was released on February 5, 2016, via Capitol Records Nashville. The lead single (and title track) was released to radio on October 19, 2015.

== Commercial performance ==
The album debuted on the Top Country Albums at No. 2, and No. 35 on the Billboard 200, selling 14,000 copies in its first week. It sold a further 4,900 copies the following week. As of June 2016, the album has sold 38,000 copies in the US.

== Track listing ==
No.	Title	Writer(s)	Length
1.	"Your Love"	Abe Stoklasa, Ashley Ray	4:15
2.	"The Driver" (featuring Dierks Bentley and Eric Paslay)	Charles Kelley, Eric Paslay, Stoklasa	4:35
3.	"Dancing Around It"	C. Kelley, Stoklasa, Daniel Tashian	4:38
4.	"Southern Accents" (featuring Stevie Nicks)	Tom Petty	4:15
5.	"Lonely Girl"	Chris Stapleton, Jesse Frasure	2:59
6.	"The Only One Who Gets Me"	C. Kelley, Nathan Chapman	3:47
7.	"Round in Circles"	C. Kelley, Josh Kelley	4:16
8.	"I Wish You Were Here" (featuring Miranda Lambert)	Jedd Hughes	3:48
9.	"Leaving Nashville"	Stoklasa, Donovan Woods	3:26

== Personnel ==
Musicians

- Charles Kelley – vocals
- Mike Rojas – Wurlitzer electric piano (1), acoustic piano (2–4, 7, 9), Hammond B3 organ (3), synthesizers (3, 5–8), accordion (4)
- Jesse Frasure – keyboards (5), programming (5)
- Josh Kelley – programming (7), acoustic guitar (7)
- Jerry McPherson – electric guitar (1–4, 6–8)
- Mark Trussell – electric guitar (1, 2), acoustic guitar (4)
- Biff Watson – acoustic guitar (1–4, 6–9)
- Paul Worley – electric guitar (1, 3, 5–8)
- Rob McNelley – electric guitar (3, 6–8)
- Daniel Tashian – electric guitar (3)
- Abe Stoklasa – pedal steel guitar (3, 4)
- Justin Schipper – pedal steel guitar (6, 8)
- Jimmie Lee Sloas – bass (1, 2, 4)
- Michael Rhodes – bass (3, 6, 7)
- Craig Young – bass (5, 8)
- Chris Stapleton – electric upright bass (5)
- Chad Cromwell – drums (1–4, 6–8)

Strings (Tracks 5 & 9)

- Kristin Wilkinson – string arrangements and composing
- Stephen Lamb – music preparation
- Sari Reist – cello
- Monisa Angell – viola
- David Davidson – violin
- Karen Winklemann – violin, contractor

Harmony vocals

- Charles Kelley – harmony vocals
- Dierks Bentley – harmony vocals (2)
- Eric Paslay – harmony vocals (2)
- Abe Stoklasa – harmony vocals (2, 3)
- Daniel Tashian – harmony vocals (3)
- Stevie Nicks – harmony vocals (4)
- Chris Stapleton – harmony vocals (5)
- Nathan Chapman – harmony vocals (6)
- Josh Kelley – harmony vocals (7)
- Miranda Lambert – harmony vocals (8)

=== Production ===
- Paul Worley – producer
- Clarke Schleicher – recording, mixing
- Erik Hellerman – vocal overdub recording, recording assistant
- Kevin Harper – additional recording, mix assistant, digital editing
- Mark Farnum – mix assistant
- Brad Winters – mix assistant
- Scott Campbell – vocal recording for Stevie Nicks (4) at The Village Recorder (Los Angeles, California)
- Jeff Garrenbaum – vocal recording assistant (4)
- Andrew Mendelson – mastering at Georgetown Masters (Nashville, Tennessee)
- Andrew Darby – mastering assistant
- Steve Dewey – mastering assistant
- Adam Grover – mastering assistant
- Paige Connors – production coordinator
- Jeremy Witt – production assistant

== Chart performance ==
=== Album ===
==== Weekly charts ====
Chart (2016)	Peak position
Australian Albums (ARIA)	35
Canadian Albums (Billboard)	43
UK Album Downloads (OCC)	78
UK Country Albums (OCC)	4
US Billboard 200	35
US Top Country Albums (Billboard)	2

==== Year-end charts ====
Chart (2016)	Position
US Top Country Albums (Billboard)	56

=== Singles ===
Year	Single	Peak chart positions	
Year	Single	US Country	US Country Airplay
2015	"The Driver"	37	44
2016	"Lonely Girl"	—	52
