= Best Shot =

Single by Jimmie Allen

from the album Mercury Lane
- Released: February 20, 2018
- Genre: Country
- Length: 3:16
- Label: Stoney Creek
- Songwriters: Jimmie Allen; Josh London; J.P. Williams
- Producers: Ash Bowers; Eric Torres

Jimmie Allen singles chronology
"Best Shot" (2018)	"Make Me Want To" (2019)

Music video
- "Best Shot" on YouTube

"Best Shot" is a song co-written and recorded by American country music singer Jimmie Allen. He wrote the song with Josh London and J.P. Williams, and released it in February 2018 via Stoney Creek as his debut single. It appears on his 2018 debut album Mercury Lane. The song is an inspirational anthem about aiming for opportunity each day to better your life. "Best Shot" gave Allen his first number-one hit of his career, spending three non-consecutive weeks atop the Billboard Country Airplay chart. It also peaked at numbers five and 37 on both the Hot Country Songs and Hot 100 charts respectively. It was certified Gold by the Recording Industry Association of America (RIAA), and has sold 146,000 copies in the United States as of April 2019. The song also charted in Canada, reaching number 79 on the Canadian Hot 100. An accompanying music video for the single, directed by Ford Fairchild, features Allen performing the song while surrounded by childhood pictures.

== Content and history ==
Jimmie Allen described the song in an interview with Billboard, saying that the concept of the song is "taking each day as an opportunity to be better for a person you have in your life." He also said that when producing the song, Ash Bowers suggested, ""Why don't we just strip everything back to where people can focus on your voice and what you're saying?" We went in, and you have the version you have now." He also said that the song's central concept of "giving your best shot" came from his grandmother.

== Commercial performance ==
"Best Shot" reached number one on the Billboard Country Airplay chart dated November 24, 2018, where it remained for two weeks. On the chart dated December 8, it fell to number two, while Kane Brown's "Lose It" overtook it at the top. Then, on the chart dated December 15, "Best Shot" returned to number one for a third and final week. As a result, it became the first song to return to number one after falling based on airplay since Jimmy Wayne's "Do You Believe Me Now" spent two non-consecutive weeks at the top in September 2008. The song's three-week run at number one also made for the longest run at the top by a debut single since Florida Georgia Line's "Cruise" also logged three weeks at the top in December 2012, and the longest reign for a solo male artist's debut single since Blake Shelton's "Austin" spent five weeks at number one in 2001. On the Billboard Hot 100, it debuted at number 97 the week of September 29, 2018. Fifteen weeks later, it peaked at number 37 the week of January 12, 2019, and remained on the chart for twenty weeks. On July 17, the song was certified platinum by the RIAA in the US, denoting combined sales and streams for over a million units. It has sold 146,000 copies in the United States as of April 2019.

In Canada, the track debuted at number 91 on the Canadian Hot 100 chart dated December 8, 2018 before leaving the next week. Two weeks later, it reappeared at number 88 before leaving the next week. It peaked at number 79 the week of January 12, 2019, and stayed on the chart for five weeks. "Best Shot" was certified platinum by Music Canada in Canada on October 22, 2020.

== Music video ==
A lyric video for "Best Shot" premiered on Allen's YouTube channel on March 18, 2018. The official music video, directed by Ford Fairchild, features Allen performing the song on a stool, while surrounded by pictures of his childhood.

== Live performance ==
On October 9, 2018, Allen made his national TV debut performing "Best Shot" on NBC's Today.

== Charts ==
=== Weekly charts ===
Chart (2018–2019)	Peak position
Canada (Canadian Hot 100)	79
Canada Country (Billboard)	1
US Billboard Hot 100	37
US Adult Pop Songs (Billboard)	33
US Country Airplay (Billboard)	1
US Hot Country Songs (Billboard)	5

=== Year-end charts ===
Chart (2018)	Position
US Country Airplay (Billboard)	45
US Hot Country Songs (Billboard)	43
Chart (2019)	Position
US Country Airplay (Billboard)	50
US Hot Country Songs (Billboard)	47

== Certifications ==
Region	Certification	Certified units/sales
Australia (ARIA)	Gold	35,000^{‡}
Canada (Music Canada)	Platinum	80,000^{‡}
United States (RIAA)	Platinum	1,000,000^{‡}
^{‡} Sales+streaming figures based on certification alone.
