= Ash Bowers =

American country music singer

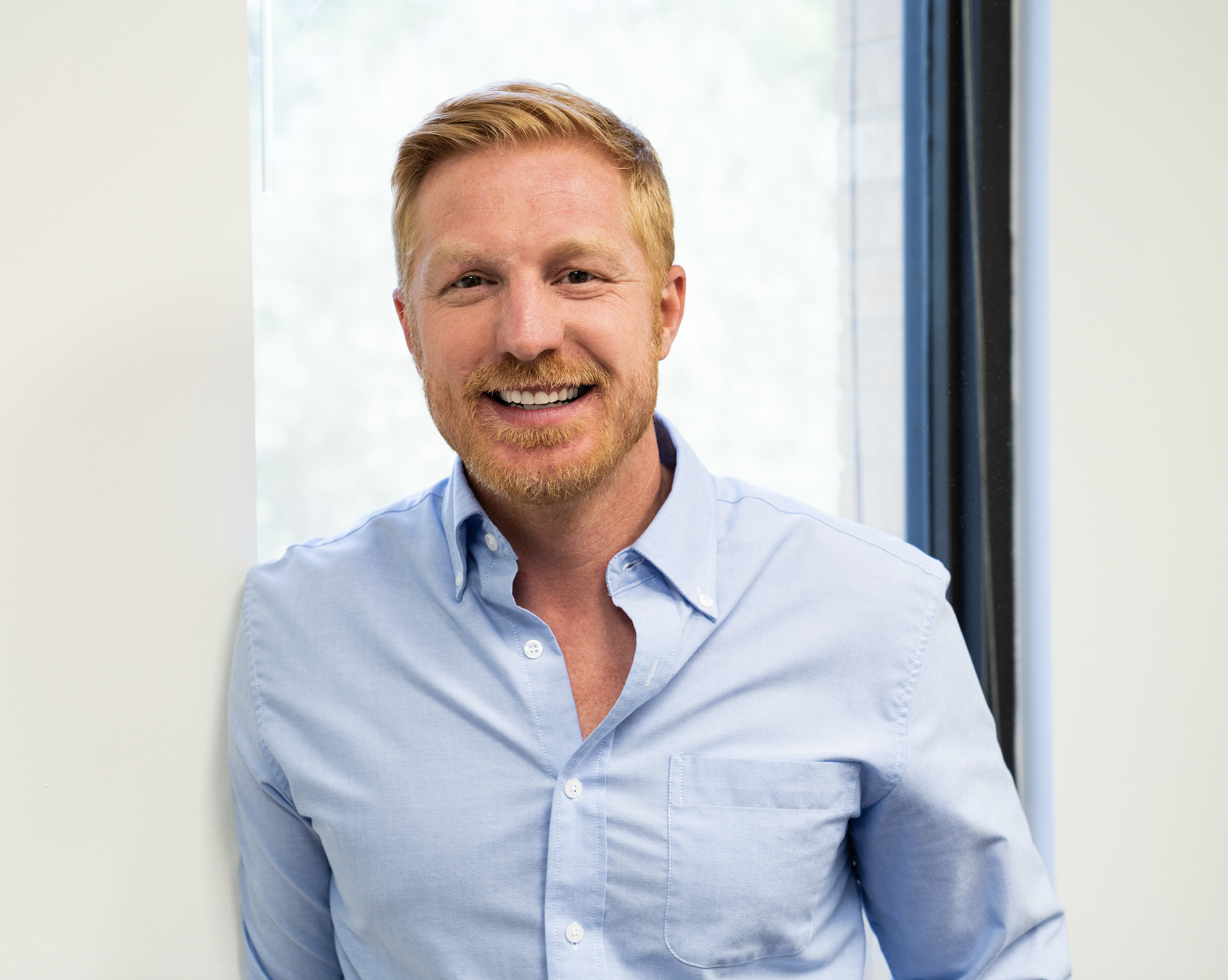
- Ash Bowers in 2019.

Background information
- Born: Ashley Walton Bowers
- Origin: Jackson, Tennessee, United States
- Genres: Country
- Occupations: Singer, songwriter, record producer
- Instrument: Vocals
- Years active: 2003–present
- Labels: Stoney Creek, Wide Open
- Formerly of: Forty5 South

Ashley Walton Bowers is an American country music singer, songwriter, record producer, and manager. Between 2003 and 2013, he was a recording artist: first as the lead singer of the band Forty5 South, then as a solo artist on Broken Bow Records (now BBR Music Group). Three of Bowers' releases as a solo artist made the Billboard Hot Country Songs charts. After leaving his career as a singer, Bowers founded Wide Open Music, an artist management company based in Nashville, Tennessee. Through this he has managed Jimmie Allen and Matt Stell, two country music artists for whom he has also co-written and produced singles.

== History ==
Ashley Bowers was born in Jackson, Tennessee. He was inspired by music from an early age, citing Jerry Lee Lewis and Kenny Chesney among his influences. Bowers initially learned how to play piano in his youth before switching to guitar.

In 2003, he founded the band Forty5 South, of which he was lead vocalist. The band's other members were Jonathon King (drums), Seth Gordon (bass guitar), Phillip Lemmings (guitar, mandolin), and Justin Tapley (guitar). The band toured through Armed Forces Entertainment between 2003 and 2005 and released two albums: Too Much, Too Fast in 2003 and We're Country So We Can in 2005. The latter was produced by Bret Michaels of Poison.

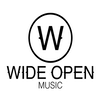
The logo for Wide Open Music

After shortening his first name to Ash, he signed to Stoney Creek Records, a division of Broken Bow Records (now BBR Music Group), in June 2009. In August 2009, Bowers released his debut single "Stuck", written by Frank J. Myers and Billy Montana. It debuted at No. 60 on the U.S. Billboard country singles charts dated for September 19. Matt Bjorke of Roughstock gave a favorable review, saying that he could identify with the song's theme of wanting to leave a small town and adding, "Even if somebody doesn’t leave that hometown they feel ‘stuck’ in, they certainly can use this song as a weekend party anthem". His debut album was to have been produced by Buddy Cannon. Two more singles were released from the project: "Ain't No Stopping Her Now" and "I Still Believe in That". After exiting Stoney Creek, Bowers released two independent singles in 2013: "Red" and "Shake It Off". These were both issued on a studio album also titled Shake It Off, which Bowers released independently in 2013.

After this, Bowers began working as a songwriter. Artists who recorded his material include Montgomery Gentry, Keith Urban, Dustin Lynch, and Randy Houser. This was followed by the foundation of Wide Open Music, a publishing and management venture which he started with Steve Williams. He also began mentoring and managing black country singer Jimmie Allen, and in 2018, the two began writing, recording, and producing songs for what would become Allen's debut album Mercury Lane. The album charted two number-one singles on Country Airplay between late 2018 and 2020: "Best Shot" and "Make Me Want To". Bowers also co-produced Allen's second album, Bettie James Gold Edition. In addition to his work with Allen, Bowers co-wrote and co-produced Matt Stell's "Prayed for You", a number-one single on Country Airplay in 2019.

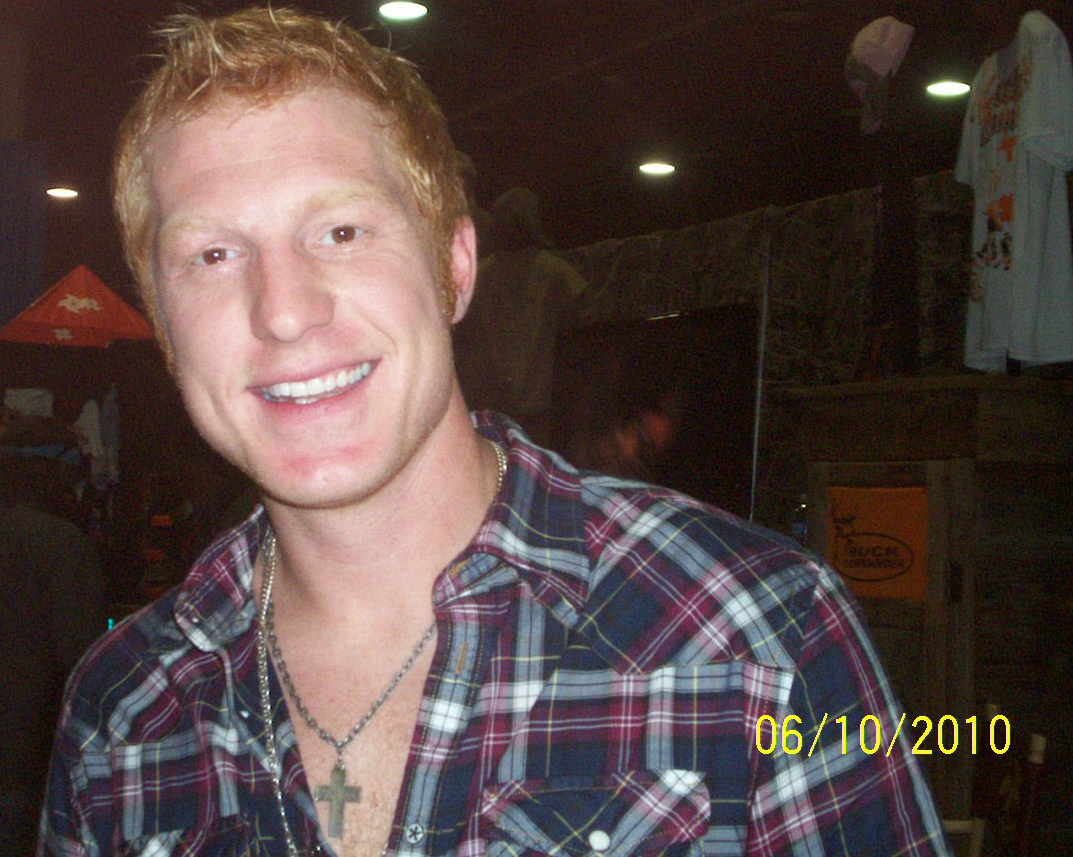
Bowers in 2010.

In 2020, record executive Barry Weiss founded a Nashville division of his record label called RECORDS, and Bowers became president of this branch. He exited the label in July 2021; that same month, he told MusicRow that he left the label because he wanted to put a greater focus on artist management.

== Discography ==
=== Studio albums ===
Title	Album details
Shake It Off	Release date: June 11, 2013; Label: Wide Open Records

=== Singles ===
Year	Single	Peak positions	Album
Year	Single	US Country	Album
2009	"Stuck"	42	—N/a
2010	"Ain't No Stopping Her Now"	44	—N/a
2011	"I Still Believe in That"	60	—N/a
2013	"Red"	—	Shake It Off
2013	"Shake It Off"	—	Shake It Off
"—" denotes releases that did not chart
