= Jimmie Allen =

American singer and songwriter (born 1985)

- Allen playing in the 2022 NBA All-Star Celebrity Game

Background information
- Born: James Edward Allen; June 18, 1985 (age 41); Milton, Delaware, U.S.
- Origin: Nashville, Tennessee, U.S.
- Genre: Country
- Occupations: Singer; songwriter
- Instruments: Vocals; guitar
- Years active: 2011–present
- Label: Stoney Creek

James Edward Allen (born June 18, 1985) is an American country music singer and songwriter. He was signed to Broken Bow Records imprint Stoney Creek, for which he released the two singles "Best Shot" and "Make Me Want To" and the 2018 album Mercury Lane. In 2021, he won the Country Music Association Award for New Artist of the Year, the second black artist to do so (in 2009, Darius Rucker was the first). He is the first black male country artist to be nominated for Best New Artist in Grammy history.

== Early life ==
Allen was born in and raised in Milton, Delaware, United States, but moved to Nashville, Tennessee, in 2007. During most of his first few years in Nashville, he experienced poverty and often lived out of his car. He auditioned for the tenth season of American Idol, but was cut before the live voting rounds. While on American Idol, he performed with Colton Dixon during one of the group rounds and befriended Scotty McCreery, who eventually won the competition that year. Allen and McCreery later reconnected and toured together after the release of Allen's debut album.

== Career ==
Allen signed a publishing deal with Wide Open Music, a songwriting imprint formed by singer-songwriter Ash Bowers, in 2016. After doing a talent showcase for representatives of Broken Bow Records in early 2017, he was signed to that label's Stoney Creek imprint and released his self-titled debut EP, which Bowers produced. The label's executive vice president said that the decision to sign Allen was one of the fastest they ever made at the label. Stephen Thomas Erlewine of AllMusic compared the EP's sound to the "slick, assured style" of Thomas Rhett and Sam Hunt. Similarly, Rolling Stone Country writer Brittney McKenna compared Allen's contemporary R&B influences to those artists and Maren Morris. A track from the EP, "Blue Jean Baby", was added to Spotify's "United States Viral 50 chart".

His first official single, "Best Shot", was released in early 2018. The week of its release, it was the second most-added song to country music radio playlists. The song has made the Hot Country Songs, Country Airplay, and Billboard Hot 100 charts and was made into a music video. Allen said that the song's title and central theme were inspired by his grandmother and his son, who was 4 at the time of the song's release. His debut album, Mercury Lane, was issued in October 2018. Also produced by Bowers, the album takes its name from the street on which Allen lived as a child. "Best Shot" was a Number One hit on the Billboard Country Airplay chart in November 2018, making him the first Black artist to send his debut single to the top of that chart. The album's second single, "Make Me Want To" released to country radio on February 1, 2019, and it also became a Number One hit on the Billboard Country Airplay chart.

Allen also recorded a cover of Lady Gaga and Bradley Cooper's "Shallow" with Abby Anderson in May 2019. The recording was made into a video as well.

In 2020, Allen released "This Is Us", a duet with Noah Cyrus. It was included on his new EP, Bettie James, which was released on July 10, 2020. The project's second single was "Freedom Was a Highway," a duet with Brad Paisley, which was released on February 1, 2021. It became Allen's third Number One hit and Paisley's twentieth on the Billboard Country Airplay in February 2022.

Allen became the first Black solo performer to win New Male Artist of the Year at the 2021 ACM Awards (at which he also performed a duet with Brad Paisley). In September 2021, Allen was announced as one of the celebrities competing on season 30 of Dancing with the Stars. He and his partner Emma Slater were the ninth couple to be eliminated, ultimately placing 7th.

On November 10, 2021, he won New Artist of the Year at the CMA Awards. 15 days later, he performed at the Macy's Thanksgiving Day Parade. In February 2022, Allen announced that he would be a guest mentor on American Idol (season 20).

He also featured on Noah Schnacky's "Don't You Wanna Know" for his 2022 album Thoughtfully Reckless and a duet with Nick Carter in "Easy".

Allen release the lead-off single, "Down Home," to his third studio album Tulip Drive on March 8, 2022. The album was released on June 24, 2022.

In 2023, Allen was a coach and judge on My Kind of Country.

== Personal life ==
Allen married his wife, Alexis Gale, in 2021 after the couple had been dating for two years. At the time of their relationship, Allen had a son from a previous relationship and Gale was pregnant with a second child. In April 2023, Allen stated through social media that he and Gale would be separating, and that Gale was pregnant with a third child.

=== Lawsuit and termination from record company ===
On May 11, 2023, Variety reported that an unnamed former manager of Allen's had filed a lawsuit against him, as well as his management company Wide Open Music and Ash Bowers, who serves as both the owner of Wide Open Music and as Allen's record producer. The manager alleged as part of the claims that Allen had sexually and verbally abused her, and that she had been fired from her role after bringing these allegations to Bowers. As a result, Allen's record label, BBR Music Group, suspended the artist effective immediately. On June 1, 2023, the Western Idaho Fair, held in Boise, Idaho, dropped Allen from scheduled performances on the grandstand lineup and announced that he would not be attending the fair that year. Further reporting from Variety on June 8 published similar reports that a second anonymous woman, who stated that she and Allen had a long-distance relationship for several months that culminated in him sexually assaulting her in a Las Vegas hotel and recording their encounter on his cell phone. Later the same day, Taste of Country confirmed that BBR Music Group dropped him as an artist.

The former manager agreed to drop the sexual assault case against Allen on March 14, 2024.

== Tours ==
Headlining

- Down Home Tour (2022)

Supporting

- Brad Paisley 2021 Tour (2021) (with Brad Paisley)
- The Denim & Rhinestones Tour (2022–23) (with Carrie Underwood)

== Discography ==
=== Albums ===
Title	Details	Peak chart positions		Sales
Title	Details	US	US Country	Sales
Mercury Lane	Release date: October 12, 2018; Label: Stoney Creek; Formats: CD, digital download, streaming	128	11	US: 13,800
Bettie James Gold Edition	Release date: June 25, 2021; Label: Stoney Creek; Formats: CD, digital download, streaming	—	—	
Tulip Drive	Release date: June 24, 2022; Label: Stoney Creek; Formats: CD, digital download, streaming	—	—	
"—" denotes releases that did not chart

=== Extended plays ===
Title	EP details
Jimmie Allen	Release date: October 6, 2017; Label: Stoney Creek; Formats: Digital download, streaming
Bettie James	Release date: July 10, 2020; Label: Stoney Creek; Formats: Digital download, streaming

=== Singles ===
==== As lead artist ====
Year	Title	Peak chart positions						Sales	Certifications	Album
Year	Title	US	US Country Songs	US Country Airplay	US Adult Pop	CAN	CAN Country	Sales	Certifications	Album
2018	"Best Shot"	37	5	1	33	79	1	US: 146,000	RIAA: Platinum	Mercury Lane
2019	"Make Me Want To"	49	7	1	—	—	5	US: 34,000	RIAA: Platinum	Mercury Lane
2020	"This Is Us" (with Noah Cyrus)	—	32	48	—	—	—		RIAA: Gold	Bettie James Gold Edition
2021	"Freedom Was a Highway" (with Brad Paisley)	45	5	1	—	—	21		RIAA: Platinum	Bettie James Gold Edition
2022	"Down Home"	61	16	2	—	—	—			Tulip Drive
2022	"Lose You" (with Cheat Codes)	—	—	—	—	—	—			One Night in Nashville
2023	"Be Alright"	—	—	57	—	—	—			Tulip Drive
"—" denotes releases that did not chart

==== As featured artist ====
Year	Title	Album
2020	"Hometown Heroes" (Moon Taxi featuring Jimmie Allen) (Note: The original version of "Hometown Heroes" is on Moon Taxi's 2020 album "Silver Dream" while this version is not.)	Non-album single

=== Other charted songs ===
Year	Song	Peak chart positions	Certifications	Album
Year	Song	US Country Songs	Certifications	Album
2020	"Good Times Roll" (with Nelly)	31	RIAA: Gold	Bettie James

=== Music videos ===
Year	Video	Director
2018	"Best Shot"	Ford Fairchild
2019	"Shallow" (with Abby Anderson)	
2019	"Make Me Want To"	Justin Key
2020	"This Is Us" (with Noah Cyrus)	Dustin Haney
2021	"Don’t You Wanna Know" (with Noah Schnacky)	Chris Beyrooty
2022	"Down Home"	Chris Beyrooty and Jimmie Allen
