= Chris Janson discography =

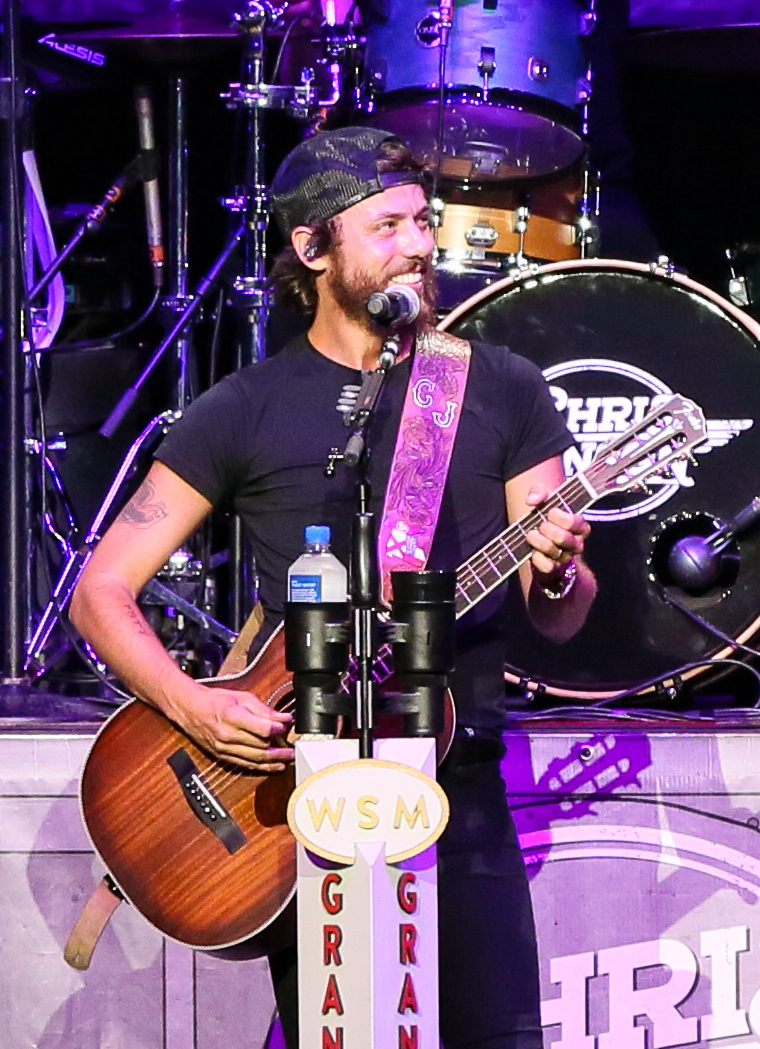
- Janson in 2019
- Studio albums: 5
- EPs: 3
- Singles: 16

American country music singer Chris Janson has released five studio albums, three extended plays, and fourteen singles. He debuted in 2010 with "'Til a Woman Comes Along", released on the former BNA Records. After the closure of BNA, Janson moved to the former Bigger Picture Music Group for a self-titled extended play containing two singles. After Bigger Picture also closed, he signed with Warner Records Nashville, for which he recorded four studio albums: Buy Me a Boat, Everybody, Real Friends, and All In. This was followed in 2023 by The Outlaw Side of Me on Big Machine Records in association with Janson's own label, Harpeth 60. Janson's albums and extended plays have accounted for a total of fourteen charted singles on the Billboard Hot Country Songs and Country Airplay charts, including two number-ones on the latter: "Good Vibes" and "Done".

== Studio albums ==
Title	Details	Peak chart positions		Sales	Certifications
Title	Details	US Country	US	Sales	Certifications
Buy Me a Boat	Release date: October 30, 2015; Label: Warner Nashville	4	18	US: 117,100	RIAA: Gold
Everybody	Release date: September 22, 2017; Label: Warner Nashville	7	53	US: 46,600	
Real Friends	Release date: October 18, 2019; Label: Warner Nashville	12	110	US: 9,900	
All In	Release date: April 29, 2022; Label: Warner Nashville	—	—		
The Outlaw Side of Me	Release date: June 16, 2023; Label: BLMG/Harpeth 60	—	—		
Wild Horses	Release date: August 1, 2025; Label: Warner Nashville	—	—		

== Extended plays ==
Title	Details	Peak chart positions		Sales
Title	Details	US Country	US Heat	Sales
Chris Janson	Release date: September 3, 2013; Label: Bigger Picture Music Group	47	27	—
Take It to the Bank	Release date: February 25, 2014; Label: Columbia Nashville	—	—	US: 5,000
The Fix a Drink EP	Release date: June 9, 2017; Label: Warner Nashville	—	—	US: 900
"—" denotes releases that did not chart

== Singles ==
Year	Title	Peak chart positions					Certifications	Sales	Album
Year	Title	US	US Country Songs	US Country Airplay	CAN	CAN Country	Certifications	Sales	Album
2010	"'Til a Woman Comes Along"	—	52		—	—			Non-album single
2013	"Better I Don't"	—	—	40	—	—			Chris Janson
2013	"Cut Me Some Slack"	—	—	60	—	—			Chris Janson
2015	"Buy Me a Boat"	41	2	3	50	2	RIAA: 5× Platinum; MC: Platinum; RMNZ: Gold	US: 1,084,000	Buy Me a Boat
2015	"Power of Positive Drinkin'"	—	46	35	—	49			Buy Me a Boat
2016	"Holdin' Her"	— (Note: "Holdin' Her" did not enter the US Billboard Hot 100, but peaked at number 15 on the Bubbling Under Hot 100 Singles chart.)	25	20	—	49	RIAA: Gold	US: 168,000	Buy Me a Boat
2017	"Fix a Drink"	67	10	2	—	4	RIAA: Platinum	US: 152,000	Everybody
2017	"Drunk Girl"	79	12	7	—	25	RIAA: Platinum	US: 180,000	Everybody
2019	"Good Vibes"	48	8	1	—	1	RIAA: Platinum	US: 77,000	Real Friends
2019	"Done"	41	8	1	84	3	RIAA: Gold		Real Friends
2020	"Waitin' on 5"	—	—	42	—	—			Real Friends
2021	"Bye Mom"	—	—	38	—	—			All In
2022	"Keys to the Country"	—	—	52	—	—			All In
2023	"All I Need Is You"	98	26	3	—	20			The Outlaw Side of Me
2024	"Whatcha See Is Whatcha Get"	—	—	28	—	58			Non-album single
2025	"Me & a Beer"	— (Note: "Me & a Beer" did not enter the US Billboard Hot 100, but peaked at number 8 on the Bubbling Under Hot 100 chart.)	36	11	—	51			Wild Horses
2026	"Fight for a Girl"	—	—	—	—	—			Wild Horses
2026	"Fun" (featuring David Lee Murphy)	—	—	57	—	—			Non-album single
"—" denotes releases that did not chart

== Other charted songs ==
Year	Title	Peak chart positions
Year	Title	US Country Airplay
2020	"It Is Christmas"	41
2023	"Holiday Road"	41

== Music videos ==
Year	Video	Director
2010	"'Til a Woman Comes Along"	Chris Hicky
2013	"Better I Don't"	Wes Edwards
2015	"Buy Me a Boat"	P. R. Brown
2016	"Power of Positive Drinkin'"	Michael Monaco
2016	"Holdin' Her"	Edgar Esteves
2017	"Fix a Drink"	Michael Monaco
2017	"Redneck Life"	Unlisted
2017	"Drunk Girl" (acoustic live video)	Alex Chaloff
2018	"Drunk Girl"	Jeff Venable
2018	"It Is Christmas"	Justin Key
2019	"Good Vibes"	Michael Monaco
2019	"Done"	Jim Shea
2020	"Waitin' on 5"	Sam Siske
2021	"Bye Mom"	Spidey Smith
2022	"All In"	Unlisted
2022	"Cold Beer Truth"	David Bradley
2022	"Keys to the Country"	David Bradley
2022	"We Did It Anyway"	David Bradley
2022	"Things You Can't Live Without (with Travis Tritt)"	David Bradley
2022	"You, Me & The River (With Eric Church)"	Reid Long
2023	"All I Need Is You"	Josh Daubin
2023	"Tap That"	Josh Daubin
2024	"Whatcha See Is Whatcha Get"	Josh Daubin & Randy Shaffer
