= 47th Academy of Country Music Awards =

US music awards ceremony in 2012

- Date: April 1, 2012
- Location: MGM Grand Garden Arena, Las Vegas, Nevada
- Hosted by: Reba McEntire; Blake Shelton

Highlights
- Most wins: Jason Aldean; Kelly Clarkson; Miranda Lambert; (2 each)
- Most nominations: Jason Aldean (6)

Television/radio coverage
- Network: CBS

The 47th Academy of Country Music Awards were held on April 1, 2012, at the MGM Grand Garden Arena, Las Vegas, Nevada. The ceremony was hosted by Reba McEntire and Blake Shelton.

== Winners and nominees ==
Winners are shown in bold.

Entertainer of the Year (Note: From 2008 to 2015, 'Entertainer of the Year' was decided by a combination of ACM professional membership and fan votes cast online and via text message.)	Album of the Year
**Taylor Swift**; Jason Aldean; Kenny Chesney; Brad Paisley; Blake Shelton	**Four the Record – Miranda Lambert**; Chief – Eric Church; Hemingway’s Whiskey – Kenny Chesney; My Kinda Party – Jason Aldean; Own the Night – Lady Antebellum
Female Artist of the Year	Male Artist of the Year
**Miranda Lambert**; Sara Evans; Martina McBride; Taylor Swift; Carrie Underwood	**Blake Shelton**; Jason Aldean; Kenny Chesney; Brad Paisley; Chris Young
Vocal Group of the Year	Vocal Duo of the Year
**Lady Antebellum**; The Band Perry; Eli Young Band; Rascal Flatts; Zac Brown Band	**Thompson Square**; Love and Theft; Montgomery Gentry; Steel Magnolia; Sugarland
Single of the Year	Song of the Year
**"Don’t You Wanna Stay" – Jason Aldean and Kelly Clarkson**; "Crazy Girl" – Eli Young Band; "Red Solo Cup" – Toby Keith; "Tomorrow" – Chris Young; "You and Tequila" – Kenny Chesney and Grace Potter	**"Crazy Girl" – Lee Brice and Liz Rose**; "Home" – Brett Beavers, Dierks Bentley and Dan Wilson; "Just a Kiss" – Dallas Davidson, Dave Haywood, Charles Kelley and Hillary Scott; "Threaten Me With Heaven" – Amy Grant, Vince Gill, Dillon O'Brian and Will Owsley; "You and Tequila" – Matraca Berg and Deana Carter
Best New Artist of the Year	Video of the Year
**Scotty McCreery**; Hunter Hayes; Brantley Gilbert	**"Red Solo Cup" – Toby Keith**; "Tattoos on This Town" – Jason Aldean; "Homeboy" – Eric Church; "Just a Kiss" – Lady Antebellum; "Mean" – Taylor Swift
Vocal Event of the Year
**"Don't You Wanna Stay" – Jason Aldean and Kelly Clarkson**; "Country Boy" – Aaron Lewis, George Jones, and Charlie Daniels; "Old Alabama" – Brad Paisley and Alabama; "Remind Me" – Brad Paisley and Carrie Underwood; "You and Tequila" – Kenny Chesney and Grace Potter

== Performers ==
Performer(s)	Song(s)
Carrie Underwood	Opening Performance "Good Girl"
Zac Brown Band	"Keep Me In Mind"
The Band Perry	"Postcard from Paris"
Keith Urban	"For You"
Blake Shelton	"Drink On It"
Hunter Hayes	"Storm Warning"
Little Big Town (in partnership with ConAgra)	"Imagine" "Here's Hope"
Jason Aldean	"Fly Over State"
Brantley Gilbert	"Country Must Be Country Wide"
Eric Church	"Springsteen"
Lady Antebellum	"Dancin' Away With My Heart"
Scotty McCreery	"Water Tower Town"
Brad Paisley	"Camouflage"
Rascal Flatts	"Banjo"
Toby Keith	"Red Solo Cup"
Sara Evans	"My Heart Can't Tell You No"
Kenny Chesney; Tim McGraw	"Feel Like A Rockstar"
Miranda Lambert	"Over You"
Zac Brown Band	"Whiskey's Gone"
Dierks Bentley	"Home"
Martina McBride; Pat Monahan	"Marry Me"
Luke Bryan	"I Don't Want This Night to End"
Blake Shelton; Lionel Richie	"You Are"

== Presenters ==
Award	Presenter(s)
Song of the Year	Beth Behrs
Single of the Year	Jake Owen; LeAnn Rimes
Top New Artist of the Year	The Band Perry
Album of the Year	Eli Young Band; Grace Potter
Top Vocal Group of the Year	Kiss
Top Male Artist of the Year	Taylor Swift
Top Female Artist of the Year	Ashton Kutcher
Entertainer of the Year	Lionel Richie
