= Me & a Beer =

2025 single by Chris Janson

Single by Chris Janson

from the album Wild Horses
- Released: April 25, 2025
- Genre: Country
- Length: 2:57
- Label: Harpeth 60; Warner Nashville
- Songwriters: Chris Janson; Andy Sheridan; Ashley Gorley; Taylor Phillips
- Producers: Janson; Sheridan

Chris Janson singles chronology
"Whatcha See Is Whatcha Get" (2024)	"Me & a Beer" (2025)	"Fight for a Girl" (2026)

Music video
- "Me & a Beer" on YouTube

"Me & a Beer" is a song by American country music singer Chris Janson. It was released on April 25, 2025 as the lead single from his sixth studio album Wild Horses (2025). He wrote the song with Andy Sheridan, Ashley Gorley and Taylor Phillips and produced it with Sheridan.

== Background ==
When Chris Janson wrote the song, he aimed to borrow elements from his songs "Fix a Drink" and "Good Vibes". He described it as an anthem for blue-collar workers and the working class, whom he considered the "real people in America."

In an interview on Taste of Country Nights, Janson stated that "Me & a Beer" was one of the hardest songs for him to write, as he began drinking infrequently after marrying and having children.

== Charts ==
Chart performance for "Me & a Beer"
Chart (2025–2026)	Peak position
Canada Country (Billboard)	51
US Bubbling Under Hot 100 (Billboard)	8
US Country Airplay (Billboard)	11
US Hot Country Songs (Billboard)	36
