= Power of Positive Drinkin' =

Single by Chris Janson

from the album Buy Me a Boat
- Released: October 19, 2015
- Genre: Country; country rock
- Length: 3:30
- Label: Warner Bros. Nashville
- Songwriter(s): Chris DuBois; Mark Irwin; Chris Janson
- Producer(s): Chris Janson; Chris DuBois; Brent Anderson

Chris Janson singles chronology
"Buy Me a Boat" (2015)	"Power of Positive Drinkin'" (2015)	"Holdin' Her" (2016)

"Power of Positive Drinkin'" is a song recorded by American country music singer Chris Janson. It was released in October 2015 the second single from his album Buy Me a Boat, which was released in late October 2015. Janson co-wrote the song with Chris DuBois and Mark Irwin.

== Content ==
The song is a mid-tempo about a man who heads to a bar after a multiple misfortunes in life such as a breakup, a broken truck, and a bad day at work.

== Critical reception ==
Website Taste of Country gave the song a positive review, writing that "Chris Janson‘s “Power of Positive Drinkin'” recalls his Warner Nashville debut “Buy Me a Boat” without sounding too familiar. He’s quickly building a brand of blue collar party songs that speak to guys (and women) like him."

== Music video ==
The music video was directed by Michael Monaco and premiered in January 2016.

== Chart performance ==
Chart (2015–2016)	Peak position
Canada Country (Billboard)	49
US Country Airplay (Billboard)	35
US Hot Country Songs (Billboard)	46
