= Cut Me Some Slack (disambiguation) =

"Cut Me Some Slack" is a song by Paul McCartney and the surviving members of rock band Nirvana. The phrase may also refer to:

- "Cut Me Some Slack", a song by Chris Janson from his self-titled debut EP 2013
- "Cut Me Some Slack", a song by Status Quo from Backbone, 2019
