= Keys to the Country =

Keys to the Country may refer to:

- Keys to the Country, a 2021 extended play by Colt Ford, or the title track
- "Keys to the Country", a 2022 song by Chris Janson from the album All In
