= Ashley Gorley =

American songwriter (born 1977)

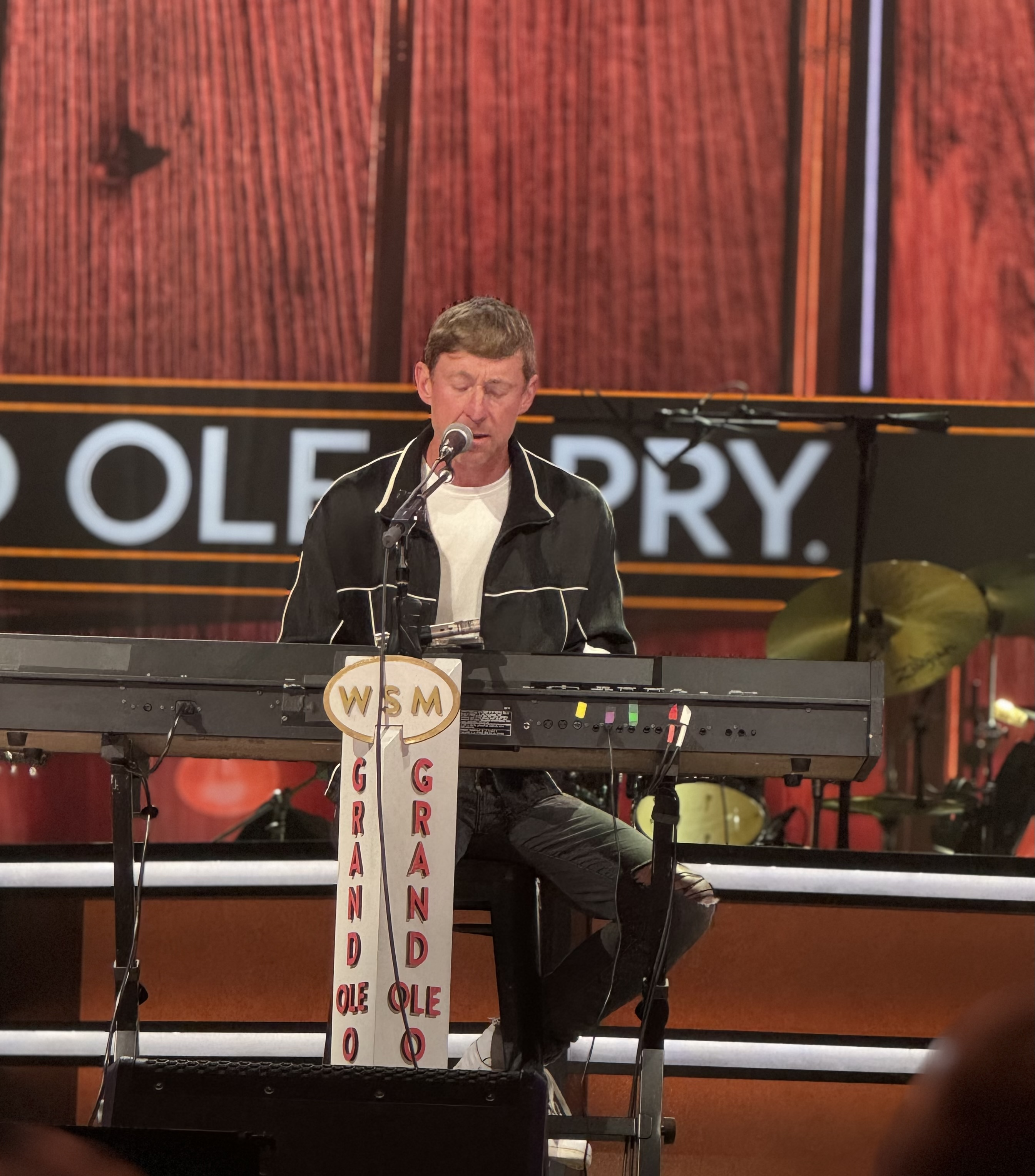
- Gorley performing at Grand Ole Opry

Background information
- Born: April 29, 1977 (age 49)
- Origin: Danville, Kentucky, United States
- Genres: Country; pop
- Occupations: Songwriter; producer
- Instruments: Guitar; piano
- Years active: 2001–present
- Website: www.taperoom.com

Ashley Gorley (born April 29, 1977) is an American songwriter, publisher, and producer from Danville, Kentucky, who is based in Nashville, Tennessee. Gorley has written 81 number 1 songs and has over 400 songs recorded by artists including Luke Bryan, Jason Aldean, Florida Georgia Line, Carrie Underwood, Blake Shelton, Bon Jovi, Nate Smith, Thomas Rhett, Jason Derulo, Kelsea Ballerini, Morgan Wallen, and Dan + Shay.

== Biography ==
Gorley was born in Danville, Kentucky, the son of Glenn and Sandra Gorley (née Alexander). Gorley graduated Belmont University in 1999 with a Music Business degree. He has continuously given back to the university through teaching music publishing (from 2006 to 2008), speaking at seminars, and mentoring current students. In 2022, Gorley signed a global publishing deal with Sony Music Publishing & Domain Capital Group.

Outside of songwriting, Gorley has fought for songwriter rights by meeting with The Library of Congress and promoting the Music Modernization Act.

== Songwriting accolades ==
Year	Awards
2009	ASCAP Country Songwriter of the Year
2013	Billboard Country Songwriter of the Year
2014	ASCAP Country Songwriter of the Year NSAI Songwriter of the Year
2015	ASCAP Country Songwriter of the Year
2016	ASCAP Country Songwriter of the Year Billboard Country Songwriter of the Year; NSAI Songwriter of the Year
2017	ASCAP Country Songwriter of the Year Billboard Country Songwriter of the Year NSAI Songwriter of the Year
2018	ASCAP Country Songwriter of the Year NSAI Songwriter of the Year
2019	ASCAP Country Songwriter of the Year
2020	ASCAP Country Songwriter of the Year NSAI Songwriter of the Year
2021	iHeart Radio Songwriter of the Year
2022	NSAI Songwriter of the Decade (2010–2019) NSAI Songwriter of the Year ASCAP Country Songwriter of the Year
2023	ACM Songwriter of the Year ACM Song of the Year ASCAP Country Songwriter of the Year NSAI Songwriter of the Year
2024	MusicRow's CountryBreakout Songwriter of the Year iHeartRadio Award's Songwriter of the Year ASCAP Country Songwriter of the Year
2025	Songwriters Hall of Fame inductee
2026	American Academy of Achievement's Golden Plate Award

== Tape Room Music ==
In 2011, Gorley created Tape Room Music, a publishing company with a focus on artist development. Writers for Tape Room have already celebrated 40 No. 1 songs, and eight Top 10 singles by artists such as Florida Georgia Line, Charlie Puth, Keith Urban, Dustin Lynch, Jason Derulo, Kane Brown, and Sam Hunt, including the 2018 ASCAP Country Song of the Year, “Body Like A Back Road.”

== Select discography ==
Discography
Year	Artist	Album	Song	Co-written with	Notes
2004	Joe Nichols	Revelation	"I Wish That Wasn't All"	Chris DuBois	
2005	Jace Everett	Jace Everett	"Everything I Want"	Bryan Simpson, Wade Kirby	
2005	Brad Paisley	Time Well Wasted	"Time Well Wasted"	Kelley Lovelace	
2005	George Strait	Somewhere Down in Texas	"If The Whole World Was A Honky Tonk"	Bryan Simpson, Wade Kirby	Platinum
2005	Carrie Underwood	Some Hearts	"Don't Forget to Remember Me"	Morgane Stapleton, Kelley Lovelace	No. 1 single, gold single
2005	Gretchen Wilson	All Jacked Up	"Rebel Child"	Gretchen Wilson, Wade Kirby	
2006	Kenny Rogers	Water & Bridges	"My Petition"	Bryan Simpson, Wade Kirby	
2006	Chris Young	Chris Young	"You're Gonna Love Me"	Bryan Simpson	
2007	Jason Aldean	Relentless	"Laughed Until We Cried"	Kelley Lovelace	Top 5 single, gold single
2007	Trace Adkins	American Man: Greatest Hits Volume II	"You're Gonna Miss This"	Lee Thomas Miller	ACM Single of the Year, ASCAP Song of the Year, No. 1 single, platinum single
2007	Carrie Underwood	Carnival Ride	"All American Girl"	Carrie Underwood, Kelley Lovelace	No. 1 single, platinum single
2008	Kristy Lee Cook	Why Wait	"I Think Too Much"	Kelley Lovelace, Bryan Simpson	
2008	Billy Currington	Little Bit of Everything	"Walk On"	Wade Kirby, Bryan Simpson	
2008	Brad Paisley	Play	"Start a Band" (feat. Keith Urban)	Dallas Davidson, Kelley Lovelace	No. 1 single
2008	Darius Rucker	Learn to Live	"It Won't Be Like This for Long"	Darius Rucker, Chris DuBois	No. 1 single, Gold single
2008	Darius Rucker	Learn to Live	"Drinkin' and Dialin'"	Darius Rucker, Chris DuBois	
2008	Blake Shelton	Startin' Fires	"This is Gonna Take All Night"	Chris DuBois	
2009	Luke Bryan	Doin' My Thing	"I Did It Again"	Luke Bryan, Brent Stenzel	
2009	Joe Nichols	Old Things New	"Believers"	Wade Kirby, Bill Luther	Top 30 single
2009	Brad Paisley	American Saturday Night	"American Saturday Night"	Brad Paisley, Chris DuBois	No. 1 single, gold single
2009	Brad Paisley	American Saturday Night	"Then"	Brad Paisley, Chris DuBois	No. 1 single, gold single
2009	Brad Paisley	American Saturday Night	"Catch All the Fish"	Brad Paisley, Chris DuBois	
2009	Lee Ann Womack	—N/a	"There Is a God"	Chris DuBois	Released as a single
2010	Trace Adkins	Cowboy's Back in Town	"Don't Mind If I Don't" (Trailer Choir)	Luke Laird	
2010	Kenny Chesney	Hemingway's Whiskey	"Where I Grew Up"	Kelley Lovelace, Neil Thrasher	
2010	Jamey Johnson	The Guitar Song	"That's Why I Write Songs"	Jamey Johnson, Chris DuBois	
2010	Sammy Kershaw	Better Than I Used to Be	"Better Than I Used to Be"	Bryan Simpson	
2010	Darius Rucker	Charleston, SC 1966	"Southern State of Mind"	Darius Rucker, Chris DuBois	
2011	Lauren Alaina	Wildflower	"Eighteen Inches"	Carrie Underwood, Kelley Lovelace	Single
2011	Luke Bryan	Tailgates & Tanlines	"I Know You're Gonna Be There"	Luke Bryan	
2011	Joe Nichols	It's All Good	"Take It Off"	Dallas Davidson, Kelley Lovelace	Top 30 single
2011	Jake Owen	Barefoot Blue Jean Night	"Heaven"	Chris DuBois, Matt Jenkins	
2011	Brad Paisley	This Is Country Music	"Working on a Tan"	Brad Paisley, Kelley Lovelace	
2011	Brad Paisley	This Is Country Music	"Love Her Like She's Leaving" (feat. Don Henley)	Brad Paisley, Chris DuBois	
2011	Brad Paisley	This Is Country Music	"Be the Lake"	Brad Paisley, Chris DuBois	
2011	Blake Shelton	Red River Blue	"I'm Sorry" (feat. Martina McBride)	Chris DuBois, Chris Stapleton	
2011	Matthew West	The Heart of Christmas	"One Last Christmas"	Matthew West	Single
2011	Chris Young	Neon	"Lost"	Chris Young, Chris Dubois	
2012	Easton Corbin	All Over the Road	"Dance Real Slow"	Carson Chamberlain, Wade Kirby	
2012	Easton Corbin	All Over the Road	"All Over the Road"	Carson Chamberlain, Wade Kirby	Top 5 single
2012	Chris Cagle	Changed	"Hot in Here"	Kelley Lovelace, Neil Thrasher	
2012	Chris Cagle	Changed	"A Little Home"	Dallas Davidson, Kelley Lovelace	
2012	Florida Georgia Line	Here's to the Good Times... This is How We Roll	"Take It Out on Me"	Shane McAnally, Chris DeStefano	
2012	Jana Kramer	Jana Kramer	"Why Ya Wanna"	Catt Gravitt, Chris DeStefano	Top 5 single, platinum
2012	Tim McGraw	Emotional Traffic	"Better Than I Used to Be"	Bryan Simpson	Top 5 single, platinum
2012	Rascal Flatts	Changed	"Hot in Here"	Kelley Lovelace, Dallas Davidson	
2012	Rascal Flatts	Changed	"A Little Home"	Kelley Lovelace, Neil Thrasher	
2012	Carrie Underwood	Blown Away	"Good Girl"	Carrie Underwood, Chris DeStefano	No. 1 single, 2× platinum single
2012	Carrie Underwood	Blown Away	"Thank God for Hometowns"	Hillary Lindsey, Luke Laird	
2013	Big Time Rush	24/Seven	"Picture This"	Carlos Pena Jr., James Maslow, Chris DeStefano	
2013	Big Time Rush	24/Seven	"Just Getting Started"	Kendal Schmidt; Logan Henderson; Chris DeStefano	
2013	Big Time Rush	24/Seven	"Na Na Na"	Carlos Pena Jr., Chris DeStefano	
2013	Luke Bryan	Crash My Party	"That's My Kind of Night"	Dallas Davidson, Chris DeStefano	No. 1 single, 2× platinum single
2013	Luke Bryan	Crash My Party	"We Run This Town"	Dallas Davidson, Kelley Lovelace	
2013	Luke Bryan	Crash My Party	"I See You"	Luke Bryan, Luke Laird	No. 1 single
2013	Luke Bryan	Crash My Party	"Crash My Party"	Rodney Clawson	No. 1 single, 2× platinum single
2013	Luke Bryan	Crash My Party	"Play It Again"	Dallas Davidson	No. 1 single, platinum single
2013	Luke Bryan	Spring Break...Here to Party	"Little Bit Later On"	Luke Bryan, Luke Laird	
2013	Luke Bryan	Spring Break...Here to Party	"Spring Break-Up"	Luke Bryan	
2013	Billy Currington	We Are Tonight	"Hey Girl"	Rhett Akins, Chris DeStefano	No. 1 single, gold single
2013	Brett Eldredge	Bring You Back	"Don't Ya"	Brett Eldredge, Chris DeStefano	No. 1 single, platinum single
2013	Will Hoge	Never Give In	"Strong"	Will Hoge, Zach Crowell	Single, National Chevy Truck Campaign Two Years
2013	Randy Houser	How Country Feels	"Runnin' Outta Moonlight"	Dallas Davidson, Kelley Lovelace	No. 1 single, platinum single
2013	Scotty McCreery	See You Tonight	"Can You Feel It"	Scotty McCreery, Zach Crowell	
2013	Scotty McCreery	See You Tonight	"See You Tonight"	Scotty McCreery, Zach Crowell	Top 10 single, gold single
2013	Scotty McCreery	See You Tonight	"This is That Night"	Dallas Davidson, Kelley Lovelace	
2013	Joe Nichols	Crickets	"Open Up A Can"	Kelley Lovelace, Dallas Davidson	
2013	Joe Nichols	Crickets	"Yeah"	Bryan Simpson	No. 1 single, gold single
2013	Jake Owen	Days of Gold	"Life of the Party"	Dallas Davidson, Chris DeStefano	
2013	Jake Owen	Days of Gold	"Good Timing"	Dallas Davidson, Zach Crowell	
2013	Jake Owen	Days of Gold	"Ghost Town"	Shane McAnally, Chris DeStefano	
2013	Jake Owen	Days of Gold	"One Little Kiss (Never Killed Nobody)"	Shane McAnally, Jimmy Robbins	
2013	Brad Paisley	Wheelhouse	"Tin Can on a String"	Brad Paisley, Kelley Lovelace	
2013	Parachute	Overnight	"Overnight"	Will Anderson, Chris DeStefano	
2013	Randy Rogers Band	Trouble	"Speak of the Devil"	Jedd Hughes, Sarah Buxton	
2013	Thomas Rhett	It Goes Like This	"In A Minute"	Thomas Rhett, Rhett Akins	
2013	Thomas Rhett	It Goes Like This	"Take You Home"	Rodney Clawson, Chris Tompkins	
2013	Darius Rucker	True Believers	"Radio"	Darius Rucker, Luke Laird	Top 5 single
2013	Chris Young	A.M.	"Aw Naw"	Chris Destefano, Chris DuBois	Top 3 Single
2013	Chris Young	A.M.	"Goodbye"	Chris Young, Chris DeStefano	
2013	Chris Young	A.M.	"A.M."	Chris Young, Chris DeStefano	
2014	Jason Aldean	Old Boots, New Dirt	"Just Gettin' Started"	Chris DeStefano, Rhett Akins	No. 1 single
2014	Jason Aldean	Old Boots, New Dirt	"Tonight Looks Good On You"	Dallas Davidson, Rhett Akins	No. 1 single
2014	Frankie Ballard	Sunshine & Whiskey	"Young & Crazy"	Rhett Akins, Shane McAnally	No. 1 single
2014	Frankie Ballard	Sunshine & Whiskey	"Sober Me Up"	Dallas Davidson	
2014	Lee Brice	I Don't Dance	"That Don't Sound Like You"	Lee Brice, Rhett Akins	Top 10 Single
2014	Lee Brice	I Don't Dance	"Somebody's Been Drinking"	Shane McNally, Hillary Lindsey	
2014	Luke Bryan	Spring Break 6...Like We Ain't Ever	"Night One"	Luke Bryan, Rhett Akins, Ben Hayslip	
2014	Chase Bryant	Chase Bryant	"Little Bit of You"	Derek George, Chase Bryant	Top 10 Single
2014	Dan + Shay	Where It All Began	"Nothin' Like You"	Dan Smyers, Shay Mooney, Chris DeStefano	No. 1 single
2014	Florida Georgia Line	Anything Goes	"Smile"	Dallas Davidson, Chris DeStefano	
2014	Florida Georgia Line	Anything Goes	"Every Night"	Chris DeStefano, Brian Kelley, Tyler Hubbard	
2014	Gloriana	—N/a	"Best Night Ever"	Hillary Lindsey, Luke Laird	Single
2014	Lucy Hale	Road Between	"Thats What I Call Crazy"	Kacey Musgraves, Chris DeStefano	
2014	Lucy Hale	Road Between	"You Sound Good to Me"	Hillary Lindsey, Luke Laird	Single
2014	Lucy Hale	Road Between	"Kiss Me"	Chris DeStefano, Mike Daly, Lindy Robbins	
2014	Love and Theft		"Night That You'll Never Forget"	Dallas Davidson	Single
2014	Dustin Lynch	Where It's At	"Halo"	Matt Jenkins, Jimmy Robbins	
2014	Dustin Lynch	Where It's At	"To the Sky"	Dustin Lynch, Zach Crowell	
2014	Dustin Lynch	Where It's At	"What You Wanna Hear"	Ben Hayslip, Rhett Akins	
2014	Dustin Lynch	Where It's At	"Middle of Nowhere"	Dustin Lynch, Zach Crowell	
2014	Jennifer Nettles & Brandy Clark	His Hands	"His Hands"	Jennifer Nettles, Hillary Lindsey	Single
2014	Rascal Flatts	Rewind	"Rewind"	Chris DeStefano, Eric Paslay	No.1 single, gold single
2014	Chase Rice	Ignite the Night	"Do It Like This"	Dallas Davidson, Chris DeStefano	
2014	Chase Rice	Ignite the Night	"Beer With The Boys"	Dallas Davidson, Chase Rice	
2014	Dallas Smith	Tippin' Point and Lifted	"This Town Ain't A Town"	Rodney Clawson, Chris DeStefano	
2014	Cole Swindell	Cole Swindell	"Swayin"	Chris DeStefano, Rhett Akins	
2014	Trisha Yearwood	PrizeFighter: Hit After Hit	"You Can't Trust The Weatherman"	Bryan Simpson, Wade Kirby	
2015	Luke Bryan	Spring Break...Checkin' Out	"Games"	Luke Bryan	Single
2015	Luke Bryan	Spring Break...Checkin' Out	"Spring Breakdown"	Luke Bryan, Zach Crowell	
2015	Luke Bryan	Kill the Lights	"Kick the Dust Up"	Dallas Davidson, Chris DeStefano	No. 1 single
2015	Luke Bryan	Kill the Lights	"Way Way Back"	Luke Bryan, Rodney Clawson	
2015	Luke Bryan	Kill the Lights	"Scarecrows"	Trevor Rosen, Shane McAnally	
2015	Easton Corbin	About to Get Real	"Clockwork"	Carson Chamberlain, Wade Kirby	Top 50 Single
2015	Billy Currington	Summer Forever	"Don't It"	Ross Copperman, Jaren Johnston	No. 1 Single
2015	Billy Currington	Summer Forever	"Wake Me Up"	Josh Osborne, Jimmy Robbins	
2015	Billy Currington	Summer Forever	"Do I Make You Wanna"	Jerry Flowers, Matt Jenkins, Zach Crowell	No. 1 Single
2015	Reba McEntire	Love Somebody	"That's When I Knew"	Jim Collins	
2015	Thomas Rhett	Tangled Up	"T-Shirt"	Luke Laird, Shane McAnally	No. 1 single
2015	Thomas Rhett	Tangled Up	"Playing with Fire"	Thomas Rhett, Rhett Akins	
2015	Thomas Rhett	Tangled Up	"Learned It From the Radio"	Nicolle Galyon, Shane McAnally, Jimmy Robbins	
2015	Carrie Underwood	Storyteller	"Dirty Laundry"	Hillary Lindsey, Zach Crowell	No. 1 Single
2015	Carrie Underwood	Storyteller	"Heartbeat"	Carrie Underwood, Zach Crowell	No. 1 Single
2016	Jason Aldean	They Don't Know	"Comin' In Hot"	Rodney Clawson, Dallas Davidson	
2016	Dierks Bentley	Black	"Black"	Dierks Bentley, Ross Copperman	No. 1 Single
2016	Dierks Bentley	Black	"Freedom"	Dierks Bentley, Ross Copperman	
2016	Bon Jovi	This House Is Not for Sale	"Roller Coaster"	Bon Jovi, Chris DeStefano	
2016	Chase Bryant	—N/a	"Room to Breathe"	Chase Bryant, Derek George	Single
2016	Eli Young Band	Fingerprints	"Saltwater Gospel"	Ross Copperman, Nicole Galyon	Single
2016	Richard Marx	The Ultimate Collection	"Last Thing I Wanted"	Richard Marx, Ross Copperman	
2016	Jake Owen	American Love	"You Ain't Going Nowhere"	Ross Copperman, Dallas Davidson	
2016	Jake Owen	American Love	"American Country Love Song"	Ross Copperman, Jaren Johnston	No. 1 Single
2016	Jon Pardi	California Sunrise	"Dirt On My Boots"	Rhett Akins, Jesse Frasure	No. 1 Single
2016	Blake Shelton	If I'm Honest	"A Guy with a Girl"	Bryan Simpson	No. 1 Single
2016	Blake Shelton	If I'm Honest	"One Night Girl"	Dallas Davidson	
2016	Brad Paisley	Love And War	"Today"	Brad Paisley, Chris DuBois	No. 1 Single
2016	Dallas Smith	Side Effects	"Sky Stays This Blue"	Ross Copperman, Josh Osborne	No. 1 Single
2016	Dallas Smith	Side Effects	"One Little Kiss"	Shane McAnally, Jimmy Robbins	Top 5 Single
2016	Dallas Smith	Side Effects	"Sleepin' Around"	Rhett Akins, Jimmy Robbins	
2016	Cole Swindell	You Should Be Here	"You Should Be Here"	Cole Swindell	No. 1 Single
2016	Cole Swindell	You Should Be Here	"Middle of a Memory"	Cole Swindell, Zach Crowell	No. 1 Single
2016	Cole Swindell	You Should Be Here	"Broke Down"	Cole Swindell, Michael Carter	
2016	William Michael Morgan	Vinyl	"Vinyl"	Carson Chamberlain Wade Kirby	Single
2017	Luke Bryan	What Makes You Country	"What Makes You Country"	Luke Bryan, Dallas Davidson	No. 1 Single
2017	Luke Bryan	What Makes You Country	"Out Of Nowhere Girl"	Luke Bryan, Dallas Davidson	
2017	Luke Bryan	What Makes You Country	"Like You Say You Do"	Luke Bryan, Michael Carter	
2017	Chase Rice	Lambs and Lions	"Eyes On You"	Chase Rice, Chris DeStefano	No. 1 Single
2017	Chris Janson	Everybody	"Fix A Drink"	Chris Janson, Chris DuBois	No. 1 Single
2017	Thomas Rhett	Life Changes	"Unforgettable"	Thomas Rhett, Jesse Frasure, Shane McAnally	No. 1 Single
2017	Thomas Rhett	Life Changes	"Marry Me"	Thomas Rhett, Jesse Frasure, Shane McAnally	No. 1 Single
2017	Thomas Rhett	Life Changes	"Life Changes"	Thomas Rhett, Jesse Frasure, Shane McAnally, Rhett Akins	No. 1 Single
2017	Blake Shelton	Texoma Shore	"I Lived It"	Rhett Akins, Ben Hayslip, Ross Copperman	Top 5 Single
2017	Blake Shelton	Texoma Shore	"Why Me"	Dallas Davidson, Ross Copperman	
2017	Blake Shelton	Texoma Shore	"When The Wine Wears Off"	Rhett Akins, Ross Copperman	
2017	Lee Brice	Lee Brice (album)	"Rumor"	Lee Brice, Kyle Jacobs	No. 1 Single
2017	Kelsea Ballerini	Unapologetically	"Roses"	Kelsea Ballerini, Zach Crowell	
2017	Carly Pearce	Every Little Thing (album)	"Hide The Wine"	Luke Laird, Hillary Lindsey	Top 20 Single
2017	Eli Young Band	Fingerprints	"Saltwater Gospel"	Nicolle Galyon, Ross Copperman	Single
2018	Cole Swindell	All Of It	"The Ones Who Got Me Here"	Cole Swindell, Jesse Frasure	
2018	Cole Swindell	All Of It	"Her"	Matt Jenkins, Chase McGill, Phil O'Donnell, Wade Kirby	
2018	Brett Young	Ticket To L.A.	"Catch"	Brett Young, Ross Copperman	No. 1 Single
2018	Eli Young Band	This Is Eli Young Band: Greatest Hits	"Love Ain't"	Shane McAnally, Ross Copperman	No. 1 Single
2018	Dierks Bentley	The Mountain	"Living"	Dierks Bentley, Ross Copperman, Jon Nite	No. 1 Single
2018	Dierks Bentley	The Mountain	"Goodbye In Telluride"	Dierks Bentley, Ross Copperman, Scooter Carusoe	
2018	Dierks Bentley	The Mountain	"Travelin' Light"	Dierks Bentley, Jon Nite	
2018	Lanco	Hallelujah Nights	"Born To Love You"	Brandon Lancaster, Josh Osborne, Ross Copperman	
2018	Jason Derulo	2Sides	"Make Up" with Vice featuring Ava Max	Jason Derulo, Eric Aguirre, Charlie Puth, Jason Kasher, Ian Kirkpatrick	
2018	Chris Lane	Laps Around The Sun	"I Don't Know About You"	Michael Hardy, Hunter Phelps, Jameson Rodgers	No. 1 Single
2018	Easton Corbin	—N/a	"A Girl Like You"	Jesse Frasure, Rhett Akins	Top 10 Single
2019	Thomas Rhett	Center Point Road	"Remember You Young"	Thomas Rhett, Jesse Frasure	No. 1 Single
2019	Thomas Rhett	Center Point Road	"Up"	Thomas Rhett, Jesse Frasure, Shane McAnally	
2019	Thomas Rhett	Center Point Road	"Don't Threaten Me With A Good Time"	Thomas Rhett, Karen Fairchild, The Stereotypes, Jesse Frasure	Single
2019	Thomas Rhett	Center Point Road	"VHS"	Thomas Rhett, Jesse Frasure, Amy Wadge	
2019	Thomas Rhett	Center Point Road	"Notice"	Thomas Rhett, Jesse Frasure, Sean Douglas	
2019	Thomas Rhett	Center Point Road	"Things You Do For Love"	Thomas Rhett, Jesse Frasure, Josh Osborne, Luke Laird	
2019	Thomas Rhett	Center Point Road	"Don't Stop Drivin'"	Thomas Rhett, Josh Miller, Zach Crowell	
2019	Thomas Rhett	Center Point Road	"Dream You Never Had"	Thomas Rhett, Rhett Akins, Jesse Frasure	
2019	Thomas Rhett	Center Point Road	"Almost"	Thomas Rhett, Jesse Frasure, Amy Wadge	
2019	Thomas Rhett	Christmas In The Country	"Christmas In The Country"	Chris Tomlin, Thomas Rhett, David Garcia	Single
2019	LOCASH	Brothers	"One Big Country Song"	Jesse Frasure, Michael Hardy	No. 1 Single
2019	Florida Georgia Line	Can't Say I Ain't Country	"Y'all Boys"	Jesse Frasure, Michael Hardy, Brett Tyler	Single
2019	Dustin Lynch	Ridin' Roads EP	"Ridin' Roads"	Dustin Lynch, Zach Crowell	Single
2019	Jake Owen	Greetings from...Jake	"Mexico In Our Minds"	Jaren Johnston, Chris DeStefano	
2019	Easton Corbin	—N/a	"Somebody's Gotta Be Country"	Dallas Davidson, Rhett Akins	Single
2019	Chris Janson	Real Friends	"Good Vibes"	Chris Janson, Zach Crowell	No. 1 Single
2019	Little Big Town	Nightfall	"Over Drinking"	Jesse Frasure, Hillary Lindsey, Cary Barlowe, Steph Jones	Single
2019	Runaway June	Blue Roses	"We Were Rich"	Nicolle Galyon, Ross Copperman	Single
2020	Hardy	A ROCK	"Give Heaven Some Hell"	Hunter Phelps, Michael Hardy, Benjamin Johnson	
2020	Thomas Rhett	Country Again: Side A	"What's Your Country Song"	Thomas Rhett, Jesse Frasure, Parker Welling Nohe,	No. 1 Single
2020	Kelsea Ballerini	Kelsea	"Hole In The Bottle"	Kelsea Ballerini, Hillary Lindsey, Jesse Frasure, Stephanie Jones	No. 1 Single
2020	Sam Hunt	Southside	"Hard to Forget"	Josh Osborne, Shane McAnally, Audrey Grisham, Luke Laird, Mary Jean Shurtz, Russ Hull, Sam Hunt	No. 1 Single
2020	Lee Brice	Hey World	"One of Them Girls"	Ben Johnson, Dallas Davidson, Lee Brice	No. 1 Single
2021	Morgan Wallen	Dangerous: The Double Album	"Sand in My Boots"	Josh Osborne, Michael Hardy	No. 1 Single
2021	Weezer	OK Human	"All My Favorite Songs"	Ben Johnson, Ilsey Juber, Rivers Cuomo	No. 1 Single
2021	Thomas Rhett	Country Again: Side A	"Country Again"	Zach Crowell, Thomas Rhett	No. 1 Single
2021	Parmalee	For You	"Take My Name"	Ben Johnson, Matt Thomas, David Fanning	No. 1 Single
2021	Dylan Scott	Livin' My Best Life	"New Truck"	Ben Johnson, Hunter Phelps, Michael Hardy	No. 1 Single
2021	Dierks Bentley ft. HARDY, Breland		"Beers on Me"	Dierks Bentley, Luke Dick, Ross Copperman, Michael Hardy, Breland	No. 1 Single
2021	Carly Pearce	29: Written in Stone	"What He Didn't Do"	Carly Pearce, Emily Shackleton	No. 1 Single
2022	Jimmie Allen	Tulip Drive	"Kissin' You"	Jimmie Allen, Zach Crowell	
2022	Jimmie Allen	Tulip Drive	"Broken Hearted" (feat. Katie Ohh)	Jimmie Allen, Will Weatherly	
2022	Russell Dickerson	Russell Dickerson	"God Gave Me a Girl"	Zach Crowell, Chase McGill, Russell Dickerson	No. 1 Single
2022	Dierks Bentley	Gravel & Gold	"Gold"	Dierks Bentley, Ross Copperman, Luke Dick	No. 1 Single
2022	Kelsea Ballerini	Subject to Change	"The Little Things"	Kelsea Ballerini, Carey Barlowe	
2022	Dustin Lynch	Blue in the Sky	"Break It on a Beach"	Dustin Lynch, Hunter Phelps, Zach Crowell	
2022	Madeline Merlo	Slide	"I Need a Drink"	Madeline Merlo, Zach Crowell	
2022	Midland	Mr. Saturday Night	"Longneck Way to Go" (feat. Jon Pardi	Jess Carson, Mark Wystrach, Cameron Duddy, Rhett Atkins, Josh Osborne	Single
2022	Joe Nichols	Good Day for Living	"Home Run"	Dallas Davidson, Ross Copperman	
2022	The Reklaws and Jake Owen	Good Ol' Days	"11 Beers"	Hunter Phelps, Michael Hardy	Single, No. 1 (Canada)
2022	Cole Swindell	Stereotype	"She Had Me at Heads Carolina"	Cole Swindell, Jesse Frasure, Thomas Rhett, Mark D. Sanders, Tim Nichols	No. 1 Single, platinum
2022	Cole Swindell	Stereotype	"Single Saturday Night"	Mark Holman, Michael Hardy	No. 1 Single
2022	Carrie Underwood	Denim & Rhinestones	"Burn"	Carrie Underwood, Hillary Lindsey, David Garcia	
2022	Carrie Underwood	Denim & Rhinestones	"Pink Champagne"	Carrie Underwood, Hillary Lindsey, David Garcia	
2023	Easton Corbin	Let's Do Country Right	"I Can't Decide"	Easton Corbin, Wade Kirby, Rhett Atkins	
2023	Easton Corbin	Let's Do Country Right	"Somebody's Gotta Be Country"	Rhett Atkins, Dallas Davidson	
2023	Easton Corbin	Let's Do Country Right	"Real Good Country Song"	Easton Corbin, Wade Kirby, Rodney Clawson	
2023	Chris Janson	The Outlaw Side of Me	"All I Need Is You"	Brad Clawson, Chris Janson	No. 1 Single
2023	Nate Smith	Nate Smith	"World on Fire"	Taylor Phillips, Nate Smith, Lindsay Rimes	No. 1 Single
2023	Dan + Shay	Bigger Houses	"Save Me the Trouble"	Dan Smyers, Jordan Minton, Jordan Reynolds, Shay Mooney	No. 1 Single
2023	Jade Eagleson	Do It Anyway	"Do It Anyway"	Chase McGill, Matt Jenkins	
2023	HARDY	The Mockingbird & the Crow	"Beer"	Michael Hardy, Ben Johnson, Hunter Phelps	
2023	HARDY	The Mockingbird & the Crow	"Truck Bed"	Michael Hardy, Ben Johnson, Hunter Phelps	No. 1 Single
2023	Tyler Hubbard	Tyler Hubbard	"Leave Me Alone"	Tyler Hubbard, Ben Johnson	
2023	Elle King	Come Get Your Wife	"Try Jesus"	Elle King, Ben Johnson, Casey Cathleen Smith, Geoffrey Warburton	
2023	Dallas Smith	Dallas Smith	"How Do You Miss Me"	Michael Hardy, Mark Holman	
2023	Morgan Wallen	One Thing at a Time	"Last Night"	John Byron, Jacob Kasher Hindlin, Ryan Vojtesak	No. 1 Single
2023	Morgan Wallen	One Thing at a Time	"Everything I Love"	Morgan Wallen, Ernest Smith, Ryan Vojtesak, Gregg Allman, Robert Kim Payne	No. 1 Single
2023	Morgan Wallen	One Thing at a Time	"One Thing at a Time"	Morgan Wallen, Ernest Smith, Ryan Vojtesak	Top 5 Single
2023	Morgan Wallen	One Thing at a Time	"Whiskey Friends"	Morgan Wallen, Ernest Smith, Ryan Vojtesak, Josh Thompson	
2023	Morgan Wallen	One Thing at a Time	"You Proof"	Morgan Wallen, Ernest Smith, Ryan Vojtesak	No. 1 Single, 2× platinum
2023	Morgan Wallen	One Thing at a Time	"Me + All Your Reasons"	Morgan Wallen, Ernest Smith, Ryan Vojtesak	
2023	Morgan Wallen	One Thing at a Time	"Tennessee Fan"	Morgan Wallen, Michael Hardy, Mark Holman	
2023	Morgan Wallen	One Thing at a Time	"Thinkin' Bout Me"	John Byron, Taylor Phillips, Ryan Vojtesak	No. 1 Single
2023	Morgan Wallen	One Thing at a Time	"Me to Me"	Morgan Wallen, Ernest Smith, Ryan Vojtesak	
2023	Morgan Wallen	One Thing at a Time	"180 (Lifestyle)"	Mark Holman, Ryan Vojtesak, Bryan Williams, Jeffrey Williams, Ernest Smith, Deqauntes Lamar, London Holmes, Arsenio Archer, Rocky Block, Blake Pendergrass	
2023	Morgan Wallen	One Thing at a Time	"Cowgirls" (feat. Ernest)	Ernest Smith, Ryan Vojtesak, Rocky Block, James Maddocks	
2023	Morgan Wallen	One Thing at a Time	"Good Girls Gone Missin"	Morgan Wallen, James Maddocks, Ernest Smith, Ryan Vojtesak	

== Tape Room discography ==
Discography
Year	Artist	Album	Song	Co-written with	Awards
2013	Keith Urban	Fuse	"Cop Car"	Matt Jenkins, Zach Crowell, Sam Hunt	Top 10 Single
2013	Scotty McCreery	See You Tonight	"See You Tonight"	Zach Crowell, Ashley Gorley, Scotty McCreery	Top 10 Single
2013	Jake Owen	Days of Gold	"Good Timing"	Zach Crowell, Dallas Davidson, Ashley Gorley	
2013	Jake Owen	Days of Gold	"Tipsy"	Matt Jenkins, Shane McAnally, Trevor Rosen	
2013	Lecrae	Gravity	"Confe$$ions"	Zach Crowell, Torrance Esmond, Michael Jefferson, Chris Mackey, Lecrae Moore, Derrick Omondi Okoth, Joseph Prielozny	Grammy for Best Gospel Album
2014	Florida Georgia Line	Anything Goes	"Confession"	Matt Jenkins, Rodney Clawson, Ross Copperman	No. 1 Single
2014	Dustin Lynch	Where It's At	"Where It's At (Yep, Yep)"	Matt Jenkins, Zach Crowell, Cary Barlowe	No. 1 Single
2014	Dustin Lynch	Where It's At	"Hell Of A Night"	Zach Crowell, Adam Sanders, Jaron Boyer	No. 1 Single
2014	Blake Shelton	Bringing Back the Sunshine	"Good Country Song"	Matt Jenkins, Jessi Alexander, Tommy Lee James	
2014	Sam Hunt	Montevallo	"House Party"	Zach Crowell, Jerry Flowers, Sam Hunt	No. 1 Single
2014	Sam Hunt	Montevallo	"Break Up in a Small Town"	Zach Crowell, Sam Hunt, Shane McAnally	Top 5 Single
2014	Sam Hunt	Montevallo	"Single for the Summer"	Zach Crowell, Sam Hunt, Shane McAnally, Josh Osborne	
2014	Sam Hunt	Montevallo	"Cop Car"	Zach Crowell, Matt Jenkins, Sam Hunt	
2014	Sam Hunt	Montevallo	"Raised On It"	Zach Crowell, Matt Jenkins, Sam Hunt	Single
2015	Luke Bryan	Spring Break...Checkin' Out	"Spring Breakdown"	Zach Crowell, Jerry Flowers, Matt Jenkins	
2015	Billy Currington	Summer Forever	"Do I Make You Wanna"	Ashley Gorley, Jerry Flowers, Matt Jenkins, Zach Crowell	
2015	Old Dominion	Meat and Candy	"Song for Another Time"	Matt Jenkins, Brad Tursi, Matthew Ramsey, Trevor Rosen	No. 1 Single
2015	Carrie Underwood	Storyteller	"Church Bells"	Zach Crowell, Brett James, Hillary Lindsey	No. 1 Single
2015	Carrie Underwood	Storyteller	"Heartbeat"	Zach Crowell, Ashley Gorley, Carrie Underwood	No. 1 Single
2015	Carrie Underwood	Storyteller	"Dirty Laundry"	Zach Crowell, Ashley Gorley, Hillary Lindsey	No. 1 Single
2016	Jason Aldean	They Don't Know	"A Little More Summertime"	Jerry Flowers, Tony Martin, Wendall Mobley	No. 1 Single
2016	Kenny Chesney	Cosmic Hallelujah	"Setting the World on Fire"	Ross Copperman, Matt Jenkins, Josh Osborne	No. 1 Single
2016	Florida Georgia Line	Dig Your Roots	"Dig Your Roots"	Jerry Flowers, Tyler Hubbard, Brett James, Brian Kelley, Ernest Keith Smith, Will Weatherly	
2016	Florida Georgia Line	Dig Your Roots	"Good Girl, Bad Boy"	Rodney Clawson, Zach Crowell, Matt Jenkins	
2016	Florida Georgia Line	Dig Your Roots	"Wish You Were On It"	Smith Ahnquist, Hunter Phelps, Jameson Rodgers, Will Weatherly	
2016	Cole Swindell	You Should Be Here	"Middle Of A Memory"	Zach Crowell, Ashley Gorley, Cole Swindell	No. 1 Single
2016	Blake Shelton	If I'm Honest	"A Guy With A Girl"	Bryan Simpson, Ashley Gorley	No. 1 Single
2017	Sam Hunt	—N/a	"Body Like A Back Road"	Zach Crowell, Sam Hunt, Josh Osborne, Shane McAnally	No. 1 Single
2018	Luke Bryan	What Makes You Country	"Sunrise, Sunburn, Sunset"	Zach Crowell, Ryan Hurd, Chase McGill	No. 1 Single
2018	Sam Hunt	—N/a	"Downtown's Dead"	Zach Crowell, Sam Hunt, Shane McAnally, Josh Osborne, Charlie Handsome	Single
2018	Kane Brown	Experiment	"Lose It"	Will Weatherly, Kane Brown, Chase McGill	No. 1 Single
2019	Kane Brown	Experiment	"Good As You"	Will Weatherly, Kane Brown, Shy Carter, Brock Berryhill, Taylor Phillips	No. 1 Single
2019	Morgan Wallen (featuring Florida Georgia Line)	If I Know Me	"Up Down"	Brad Clawson, Michael Hardy, CJ Solar	No. 1 Single
2019	Florida Georgia Line	Can't Say I Ain't Country	"Talk You Out Of It"	Hunter Phelps, Michael Hardy, Alysa Vanderheym, Jameson Rodgers	Single
