= All I Need Is You (disambiguation) =

"All I Need Is You" is a 2004 single by Australian singer Guy Sebastian.

All I Need Is You may also refer to:

== Songs ==
- "All I Need Is You" (Chris Janson song), 2023
- "All I Need Is You" (Kesha song), 2023
- "All I Need Is You" (Lecrae song), 2014
- "All I Need Is You", 2010, from Just You and Me by Adie
- "All I Need Is You", 2011, from Distant Earth by ATB
- "All I Need Is You", 1994, from The Boy in Me, among others, by Glen Campbell
- "All I Need Is You", 2007, from Modern Minds and Pastimes by the Click Five
- "All I Need Is You", 2005, from Look to You, among others, by Hillsong United
- "All I Need Is You", 2005, from God He Reigns, among others, by Hillsong Worship
- "All I Need Is You", 2001, from Hi-Teknology by Hi-Tek
- "All I Need Is You", 2010, from Det bästa från Idol 2010 by Idol Allstars 2010
- "All I Need Is You", 1983, from Stranger to Stranger by Industry
- "All I Need Is You", 1988, from Red Rose for Gregory by Gregory Isaacs
- "All I Need Is You", 2000, from Way to Your Heart by Kyla
- "All I Need Is You", 1957, from Peggy Lee Sings with Benny Goodman by Peggy Lee and Benny Goodman
- "All I Need Is You", 2007, from God Put a Rainbow in the Sky by Miss Li
- "All I Need Is You", 2011, from Just Me by Brian McKnight
- "All I Need Is You", 1998, from Chapter I: A New Beginning by the Moffatts
- "All I Need Is You", 2013, from Tribute by John Newman
- "All I Need Is You", 1979, from Teddy by Teddy Pendergrass
- "All I Need Is You", 2008, from Some Small History by Portastatic
- "All I Need Is You", 1990, from Preserves Uncanned, among others, by Strawbs
- "All I Need Is You", 1981, from Voyeur, among others, by David Sanborn
- "All I Need Is You", 1959, from Rock with Sedaka, among others, by Neil Sedaka
- "All I Need Is You", 1966, a UK Top 10 single for Dusty Springfield
- "All I Need Is You", 1993, from Are U Satisfied by Jon Stevens
- "All I Need Is You", 1980, from This Is My Dream by Switch
- "All I Need Is You", 1971, from Two of a Kind, among others, by Porter Wagoner and Dolly Parton
- "All I Need Is You", 1999, from Spirit of Music by Ziggy Marley and the Melody Makers
