= This Is Country Music (song) =

Single by Brad Paisley

from the album This Is Country Music
- Released: December 13, 2010
- Recorded: November 2010
- Genre: Country
- Length: 5:17 (album version); 4:19 (radio version)
- Label: Arista Nashville
- Songwriters: Brad Paisley; Chris DuBois
- Producer: Frank Rogers

Brad Paisley singles chronology
"Anything Like Me" (2010)	"This Is Country Music" (2010)	"Old Alabama" (2011)

"This Is Country Music" is a song co-written and recorded by American country music artist Brad Paisley. After performing it at the Country Music Association awards ceremony, Paisley released the song in December 2010. The song is Paisley's twenty-eighth single release overall; it entered the Hot Country Songs charts dated for December 4, 2010. It was included on his eighth studio album, of the same name, released on May 23, 2011 release via Arista Nashville.

== History ==
Paisley debuted the song at the Country Music Association (CMA) awards show on November 10, 2010. At the time, he had not recorded a studio version of the song and said that the CMA performance would be like a demo; two days after performing it, he announced via Twitter that he was working with producer Frank Rogers on the final version of the song. Paisley also said that he "almost [broke] down crying" while recording it.

He also made the studio version of the song available as a free digital download on his website. The song is the title track to his album This Is Country Music, which was released on May 24, 2011.

== Content ==
Paisley wrote the song with frequent co-writer Chris DuBois. The song addresses topics that are commonly used in country music songs, saying that these topics "ain't hip". He told The Boot that the song is "my love song to my fans, who live all our songs every day, and to this industry, which produces this music that does become the soundtrack to people's lives."

The lyrics also contain references to "He Stopped Loving Her Today" by George Jones, "Hello Darlin'" by Conway Twitty, "God Bless the U.S.A." by Lee Greenwood, "Amarillo by Morning" by George Strait, "Take This Job and Shove It" by Johnny Paycheck, "Stand by Your Man" by Tammy Wynette, "Mama Tried" by Merle Haggard, "Take Me Home, Country Roads" by John Denver, "I Walk the Line" by Johnny Cash and "A Country Boy Can Survive" by Hank Williams, Jr.

== Critical reception ==
Blake Boldt of Engine 145 gave the song a thumbs-down, saying that Paisley's vocal was "humble and heartfelt" but calling the song's lyrics "awkward and forced." Matt Bjorke of Roughstock rated it two-and-a-half stars out of five, also criticizing the lyrics but praising the "traditionalist" production.

== Chart performance ==
The song debuted at number 52 on the Hot Country Songs for the week ending December 4, 2010, the same week that Paisley's previous single "Anything Like Me" was at the number one position. It has sold 370,000 copies in US. On the next week's charts, "This Is Country Music" entered the top 40 at number 29.

Chart (2010–2011)	Peak position
Canada Country (Billboard)	1
Canada Hot 100 (Billboard)	67
US Billboard Hot 100	58
US Hot Country Songs (Billboard)	2

=== Year-end charts ===
Chart (2011)	Position
US Country Songs (Billboard)	34

== Parodies ==
- American parody artist Cledus T. Judd released a parody of "This Is Country Music" titled "If This Is Country Music" on his 2012 album Parodyziac!!.
