= Buy Me a Boat (song) =

Single by Chris Janson

from the album Buy Me a Boat
- Released: March 20, 2015
- Genre: Country
- Length: 2:59
- Label: Warner Bros. Nashville
- Songwriter(s): Chris Janson; Chris DuBois
- Producer(s): Chris Janson; Chris DuBois; Brent Anderson

Chris Janson singles chronology
"Cut Me Some Slack" (2013)	"Buy Me a Boat" (2015)	"Power of Positive Drinkin'" (2015)

Alternate cover

"Buy Me a Boat" is a song co-written and recorded by American country music singer Chris Janson. It is Janson's fourth single release overall and the lead single from his debut studio album of the same name. The song was written by Janson and Chris DuBois.

== Content ==
The song has a male narrator expressing the fact that "money can't buy happiness / but it can buy me a boat" and other recreational items.

On writing the song, Janson told Billboard that "I didn't pull any influence from anywhere except the stuff that I loved. The song came so quick and it felt so right and easy and we did it. I'll be the first to tell you that I don't know what a hit is. There was a special feeling and the song had that something, whatever that is... but we didn’t want to jinx it. It wasn’t a big plan where we were scheming behind the scenes. This is real."

== History ==
Janson's previous label, Bigger Picture Music Group, closed in May 2014. After its closure, he self-released "Buy Me a Boat" to iTunes on March 20, 2015. The song gained attention after it received some radio airplay on the Bobby Bones Show the day of its release, sending the song to the top of iTunes country chart. The song also received a boost from Toby Keith who tweeted his support to his fans. On the strength of its performance, Janson became signed to Warner Bros. Records Nashville, and the song was re-released as a single. The single was selected by iHeartMedia for their "On The Verge" program that showcased new artists, giving the song airplay on 140 country radio stations for six weeks, starting May 4, 2015.

== Critical reception ==
An uncredited review from Taste of Country praised the "sharp lines" of the song and the prominent electric guitar in the production, in addition to saying that "[t]he mellow country-rocker is the sort of blue collar hero song that gets released every spring, but it comes across with sincerity sorely lacking from many others."

== Commercial performance ==
Based purely on radioplay by Bobby Bones and word of mouth, the song reached No. 1 on the iTunes country chart over the weekend the song was played, selling 21,000 copies in three days. It debuted on the Country Digital Songs chart at No. 8 and Hot Country Songs at No. 33. The song was re-released in late April 2015, and debuted on the Country Airplay chart at No. 60 (chart date May 16, 2015). It topped the Most Increased Audience and Most Added radio chart in its second week of release, jumping from No. 60 to No. 29 in the Country Airplay chart. After climbing up the radioplay chart, the song debuted on the Billboard Hot 100 at 92 for the chart dated June 13, 2015. The song peaked at No. 41 on the Hot 100 for the chart of September 12, 2015, and two weeks later at No. 3 on the Country Airplay chart and No. 2 on the Hot Country Songs chart.

The song was certified Gold by the RIAA on August 14, 2015, and Platinum on December 10, 2015. The song reached its million sales mark in August 2016. and has sold 1,084,000 copies in the United States as of November 2016.

== Music video ==
The television network Country Music Television (CMT) financed and produced the song's music video, the first music video ever financed by the network itself. The video also features Nashville actor Charles Esten.

== Charts and certifications ==
=== Weekly charts ===
Chart (2015)	Peak position
Canada (Canadian Hot 100)	50
Canada Country (Billboard)	2
US Billboard Hot 100	41
US Country Airplay (Billboard)	3
US Hot Country Songs (Billboard)	2

=== Year-end charts ===
Chart (2015)	Position
US Country Airplay (Billboard)	26
US Hot Country Songs (Billboard)	8

=== Certifications ===
Region	Certification	Certified units/sales
Canada (Music Canada)	Platinum	80,000^{‡}
United States (RIAA)	5× Platinum	1,084,000
^{‡} Sales+streaming figures based on certification alone.
