= See You Tonight =

Studio album by Scotty McCreery
- Released: October 15, 2013
- Studios: The Castle, The Pool House, Blackbird Studios and Starstruck Studios (Nashville, Tennessee)
- Genre: Country
- Length: 46:52
- Labels: Mercury Nashville; 19
- Producers: Frank Rogers (all tracks except 7 & 16); Mark Bright (tracks 7 & 16)

Scotty McCreery chronology
Christmas with Scotty McCreery (2012)	See You Tonight (2013)	Seasons Change (2018)

Singles from See You Tonight
- 1. "See You Tonight" Released: April 9, 2013; 2. "Feelin' It" Released: April 14, 2014

See You Tonight is the third studio album by American country music singer Scotty McCreery. It was released on October 15, 2013, by Mercury Nashville. The album is produced by Frank Rogers with the exception of two tracks produced by Mark Bright.

The album garnered a positive reception from critics who praised McCreery's improved musicianship over a plethora of well-balanced songs. See You Tonight debuted at number 6 on the Billboard 200 and spawned two singles: the title track and "Feelin' It". As of April 2015, the album has sold 269,900 copies in the United States.

== Background ==
Scotty McCreery recorded the album while he was attending North Carolina State University. The producer of the album was Frank Rogers. McCreery co-wrote 5 of the tracks of the album, including the title track which he co-wrote with songwriter Ashley Gorley and Zach Crowell. He also collaborated with Alison Krauss on "Carolina Moon" where she provides backing vocals. He considered "Carolina Moon" to be his favorite track on the album.

== Reception ==
Professional ratings
Aggregate scores
Source	Rating
Metacritic	73/100
Review scores
Source	Rating
AllMusic	3.5/5 stars
Billboard	71/100
Country Weekly	(B+)
Entertainment Weekly	(B)
Los Angeles Times	2.5/4 stars
Rolling Stone	3/5 stars
Roughstock	4.5/5 stars

The album received generally positive reviews from music critics, with an overall Metacritic rating of 73 indicating "generally favorable reviews". Stephen Thomas Erlewine of AllMusic found that the sound of the album has changed from the old-fashioned country of the first album, that its modern country sound is so "glossy and effervescent" making it seem McCreery's voice had jumped a couple of octave. He considered that McCreery had redefined himself as a "sports bar-hopping bro" in the album, but nevertheless thought the album works. Chuck Dauphin of Billboard thought that McCreery and the producers did well in stretching his music wings in the album, with positive reviews for most of the tracks.

Grady Smith of Entertainment Weekly felt that the first half of the album "bogs down under too much by-the-numbers rock-country," but "hits its stride in the smoother second half". Tammy Ragusa of Country Weekly concurred that the album seems at times "a bit formulaic, with songs that subscribe to what is currently hitting big on country radio", but also thought it "exhilarating to hear Scotty stretch out, both in content and vocals". Matt Bjorke of Roughstock considered that the "hook-filled, radio-ready 'summer songs'" in the album are counterbalanced with strong, mid-tempo songs as well as traditional ballads, and thought that the album showed "a remarkable amount of growth and maturity" for McCreery. Billy Duke of Taste of Country was enthusiastic about the album, calling it "dynamic", and thought the songwriting and production "sharp".

== Commercial performance ==
The album debuted as the number 1 country album and the number 6 album on the US Billboard 200, selling 52,000 copies. It also debuted at No. 3 on the Top Internet Albums and No. 10 on the Top Digital Albums charts. As of April 2015, the album has sold 269,900 copies in the US.

== Track listing ==
No.	Title	Writer(s)	Length
1.	"Now"	Scotty McCreery; busbee; Frank Rogers	3:27
2.	"See You Tonight"	McCreery; Ashley Gorley; Zach Crowell	3:46
3.	"Get Gone with You"	Ross Copperman; Lynn Hutton; Tammi Kidd Hutton	3:16
4.	"Feelin' It"	Rogers; Matthew West	3:18
5.	"Feel Good Summer Song"	J. T. Harding; Shane McAnally; Josh Osborne	4:07
6.	"Buzzin'"	busbee; Rogers	3:47
7.	"Can You Feel It"	McCreery; Gorley; Crowell	3:18
8.	"The Dash"	Kyle Jacobs; Preston Brust	3:45
9.	"Blue Jean Baby"	Matthew Ramsey; Trevor Rosen; Matt Jenkins	2:58
10.	"Forget to Forget You"	Casey Beathard; Michael Dulaney	3:58
11.	"I Don't Wanna Be Your Friend"	McCreery; Rogers; David Fanning	3:13
12.	"Carolina Moon" (featuring Alison Krauss)	Jon Randall; Ronnie Stewart	4:57
13.	"Something More"	McCreery; Rogers	3:29

Deluxe Edition
No.	Title	Writer(s)	Length
14.	"Roll Your Window Down"	Ben Hayslip; Rhett Akins; Dallas Davidson	3:01
15.	"Before Midnight"	McCreery; Jon Nite; Jimmy Robbins	3:22
16.	"Carolina Eyes"	Cole Swindell; Adam Sanders; Aaron Goodvin	3:54

Deluxe Edition (Walmart-exclusive version)
No.	Title	Writer(s)	Length
17.	"Suntan"	Davidson; Jon Pardi; Phillip White	3:37
18.	"This Is That Night"	Davidson; Gorley; Kelley Lovelace	3:26

== Personnel ==
Adapted from liner notes.

All tracks except 7 & 16

- Scotty McCreery – lead vocals
- Jim "Moose" Brown – acoustic piano, Wurlitzer electric piano, Hammond B3 organ
- Gordon Mote – acoustic piano, Wurlitzer electric piano, Hammond B3 organ
- Frank Rogers – keyboards, programming, baritone guitar, electric guitar, backing vocals
- J.T. Corenflos – electric guitar
- Jedd Hughes – acoustic guitar, electric guitar
- Bryan Sutton – electric guitar, mandolin
- Ilya Toshinsky – acoustic guitar, electric guitar, mandolin, banjo, bouzouki
- Derek Wells – acoustic guitar, electric guitar
- Mike Johnson – pedal steel guitar, dobro
- Rachel Loy – bass guitar
- Shannon Forrest – drums
- Greg Morrow – drums
- Eric Darken – percussion
- Kirk "Jelly Roll" Johnson – harmonica
- Aubrey Haynie – fiddle
- Anthony LaMarchina – cello
- Kris Wilkinson – viola, string arrangements
- David Angell – violin
- Wei Tsun Chang – violin
- David Davidson – violin
- Wes Hightower – backing vocals
- Jon Randall – backing vocals
- Russell Terrell – backing vocals
- Matthew West – backing vocals
- Alison Krauss – featured vocals on "Carolina Moon"

Tracks 7 & 16

- Scotty McCreery – lead vocals
- Charlie Judge – keyboards, synthesizers, Hammond B3 organ
- Jimmy Nichols – acoustic piano, Wurlitzer electric piano
- Brent Mason – electric guitars
- Ilya Toshinsky – acoustic guitars, banjo, ganjo
- Jimmie Lee Sloas – bass guitar
- Shannon Forrest – drums
- Aubrey Haynie – fiddle
- Perry Coleman – backing vocals
- Russell Terrell – backing vocals
- Jenifer Wrinkle – backing vocals

== Production ==
- Brian Wright – A&R
- Hank Williams – mastering at MasterMix (Nashville, Tennessee)
- Russ Harrington – photography
- Karen Naff – art direction
- Wendy Stamberger – design
- Amber Lehman – wardrobe stylist
- Paula Turner – hair, make-up

All tracks except 7 & 16

- Frank Rogers – producer, additional recording
- Scott Johnson – production assistant
- Richard Barrow – recording, additional recording
- Beau Maxwell – recording assistant
- Rich Ramsey – recording assistant
- Neal Cappellino – additional recording
- Nathan Zwald – additional recording
- Justin Niebank – mixing
- Drew Bollman – mix assistant
- Scotty Alexander – digital editing
- Brady Barrett – digital editing
- Matt Rausch – digital editing
- Brian David Willis – digital editing

Tracks 7 & 16

- Mark Bright – producer
- Mike "Frog" Griffith – production coordinator
- Kirsten Wines – production assistant
- Derek Bason – recording, mixing, digital editing
- Ben Fowler – recording
- Chris Small – recording assistant, mix assistant
- Sean Neff – digital editing

== Singles ==
The title track, "See You Tonight", the album's first single was released on April 9, 2013. It was his first Top Ten hit on the country charts.

The second single, "Feelin' It", was released to country radio on April 14, 2014.

== Chart performance ==
=== Weekly charts ===
Chart (2013)	Peak position
Canadian Albums (Billboard)	25
US Billboard 200	6
US Top Country Albums (Billboard)	1

=== Year-end charts ===
Chart (2013)	Position
US Top Country Albums (Billboard)	47

Chart (2014)	Position
US Billboard 200	170
US Top Country Albums (Billboard)	27

=== Singles ===
Year	Single	Peak chart positions				Sales	Certifications
Year	Single	US Country	US Country Airplay	US	CAN Country	Sales	Certifications
2013	"See You Tonight"	10	8	52	34	US: 693,000	RIAA: Platinum
2014	"Feelin' It"	16	10	84	46	US: 293,000	RIAA: Gold

== Release date ==
Country	Date	Format	Label
United States	October 15, 2013	CD, digital download	Mercury Nashville, 19
