= Buy Me a Boat =

Studio album by Chris Janson
- Released: October 30, 2015
- Genre: Country
- Label: Warner Bros. Nashville
- Producer: Brent Anderson; Chris DuBois; Byron Gallimore; Chris Janson

Chris Janson chronology
Take It to the Bank (2014)	Buy Me a Boat (2015)	Everybody (2017)

Singles from Buy Me a Boat
- 1. "Buy Me a Boat" Released: March 20, 2015; 2. "Power of Positive Drinkin'" Released: October 19, 2015; 3. "Holdin' Her" Released: May 2, 2016

Buy Me a Boat is the debut studio album by American country music singer Chris Janson. The album was released on October 30, 2015. It features the singles "Buy Me a Boat", "Power of Positive Drinkin'" and "Holdin' Her".

== Critical reception ==
Professional ratings
Review scores
Source	Rating
AllMusic	3.5/5 stars

Stephen Thomas Erlewine of Allmusic wrote that "if [the title track's] accompanying album isn't quite up to its standards, it's nevertheless the work of an accomplished writer who knows how to sculpt a song for a wide audience. If Buy Me a Boat can be faulted, it's because its diversity often plays like a demo tape, with Janson crafting songs for any possible contemporary country audience."

== Commercial performance ==
The album debuted at No. 4 on the Top Country Albums chart, and No. 18 on the Billboard 200, selling 18,536 copies in its first week. The album has sold 117,100 copies in the US as of March 2017.

== Track listing ==
All tracks are written by Chris Janson, with additional co-writers as noted.

No.	Title	Writer(s)	Length
1.	"Buy Me a Boat"	Chris DuBois	2:59
2.	"Power of Positive Drinkin'"	DuBois; Mark Irwin	3:30
3.	"Under the Sun"	Casey Beathard; Ed Hill	3:26
4.	"Holdin' Her"	James Otto	4:05
5.	"Messin' with Jesus" (featuring Tim McGraw)	Kelly Roland; Pavel Dovgalyuk	3:06
6.	"Right in the Middle"	Brandon Kinney; Justin Wilson	2:23
7.	"Save a Little Sugar"	DuBois; Jim Beavers	3:02
8.	"Back in My Drinkin' Days"	Ken Johnson	2:44
9.	"Where You Come In"	Hill	3:17
10.	"Yeah It Is"	Ken Wright	3:18
11.	"White Trash"	Beathard	3:47

== Personnel ==
Adapted from Buy Me a Boat liner notes.

=== Musicians ===
- Brent Anderson - acoustic guitar (all tracks except 4), background vocals (all tracks except 3), synthesizer (2), bouzouki (11)
- David Dorn - Hammond B-3 organ (2, 7, 11), keyboards (2, 3, 4, 5, 6, 9, 10), synthesizer (7), piano (8), Wurlitzer electric piano (11)
- Shannon Forrest - drums (4, 5, 9), programming (9)
- Byron Gallimore - acoustic guitar (9)
- Chris Janson - lead vocals (all tracks), acoustic guitar (4), harmonica (8)
- Troy Lancaster - electric guitar (3, 4, 5, 6, 9, 10)
- Tony Lucido - bass guitar (all tracks)
- Fred Newell - steel guitar (3, 6, 8, 10)
- Justin Ostrander - electric guitar (1, 2, 7, 11)
- Russ Pahl - Jew's harp (7), steel guitar (8)
- Ben Phillips - drums (except 4, 5, 9), programming (2, 7)
- Jeff Roach - synthesizer (1, 2)
- Justin Schipper - steel guitar (4, 5, 9)
- Will Weatherly - programming (1, 2, 7)
- Derek Wells - electric guitar (3, 6, 8, 10)

=== Technical ===
Tracks 1, 2, 7, 8, 11

- Brent Anderson - producer
- Jeff Balding - recording
- Matt Coles - assistant
- Chris DuBois - producer
- Chris Janson - producer
- Scott Johnson - production assistant
- Ben Phillips - recording, digital editing, mixing
- Will Weatherly - digital editing

Tracks 3–6, 9, 10

- Stephen Allbritten - assistant (3, 4, 6, and 10 only)
- Jake Burns - assistant (4, 5, and 9 only)
- Byron Gallimore - producer, mixing
- Julian King - recording
- Erik Lutkins - additional recording (3, 4, 6, and 10 only)
- Ernesto Olivera - assistant (3, 6, and 10 only)

All tracks

- Adam Ayan - mastering
- Eric Brown - photography
- Katherine Petillo - art direction, design
- Shane Tarleton - creative director

== Charts ==
=== Weekly charts ===
Chart (2015)	Peak position
US Billboard 200	18
US Top Country Albums (Billboard)	4

=== Year-end charts ===
Chart (2016)	Position
US Top Country Albums (Billboard)	35

== Certifications ==
Region	Certification	Certified units/sales
United States (RIAA)	Gold	500,000^{‡}
^{‡} Sales+streaming figures based on certification alone.
