= Everybody (Chris Janson album) =

Studio album by Chris Janson
- Released: September 22, 2017
- Genre: Country
- Length: 37:27
- Label: Warner Bros. Nashville
- Producers: Brent Anderson; Chris DuBois; Scott Hendricks; Chris Janson; Craig Wiseman

Chris Janson chronology
Buy Me a Boat (2015)	Everybody (2017)	Real Friends (2019)

Singles from Everybody
- 1. "Fix a Drink" Released: May 22, 2017; 2. "Drunk Girl" Released: December 11, 2017

Everybody is the second studio album by American country music artist Chris Janson. It was released on September 22, 2017, via Warner Bros. Records. It includes the singles "Fix a Drink" and "Drunk Girl". The track "Little Bit of Both" was previously recorded by Frankie Ballard on his 2016 album El Río.

== Critical reception ==
Rating it 3.5 out of 5 stars, Stephen Thomas Erlewine of AllMusic wrote that "He delivers these (mostly) sweet songs with a grin and the hooks aren't pushed, they roll easy, and these two qualities turn Everybody into a sunny, appealing album."

== Commercial performance ==
Everybody debuted at No. 7 on Billboard's Top Country Albums, selling 8,000 copies in pure sales (11,000 units including streams and track sales). The album has sold 46,600 copies in the United States as of January 2019.

== Track listing ==
Everybody track listing
No.	Title	Writer(s)	Producer(s)	Length
1.	"Who's Your Farmer"	Chris Janson; Buddy Owens; Mitch Oglesby	Scott Hendricks	2:50
2.	"Everybody"	Janson; Tom Douglas; Casey Beathard	Janson	2:52
3.	"Name on It"	Janson; Ashley Gorley; Chris DuBois; Ross Copperman	Hendricks	2:43
4.	"Eyes for Nobody"	Janson; Jeremy Stover	Hendricks	3:37
5.	"Fix a Drink"	Janson; DuBois; Gorley	DuBois; Brent Anderson	3:09
6.	"Out There"	Janson; Corey Crowder	Hendricks	2:59
7.	"Little Bit of Both"	Janson; Craig Wiseman; Ben Hayslip	Hendricks; Wiseman	3:14
8.	"Our World"	Janson; Rhett Akins; Hayslip	Hendricks	3:04
9.	"Bein' a Dad"	Beathard; Ed Hill; Janson	Hendricks	3:47
10.	"When You Like Me"	Janson; Beathard; Kelly Roland	Hendricks	2:57
11.	"Redneck Life"	Janson; Oglesby	Janson; Hendricks	2:48
12.	"Drunk Girl"	Janson; Scooter Carusoe; Douglas	Hendricks	3:27
Total length:				37:27

== Personnel ==
Adapted from Everybody liner notes.

=== Musicians ===
- Roy Agee – trombone (7)
- Brent Anderson – acoustic guitar (5), banjo (5), background vocals (5)
- Joeie Canaday – bass guitar (11)
- Jeff Coffin – saxophone (7)
- Perry Coleman – background vocals (1, 3, 4, 6–10, 12)
- Paul DiGiavonni – programming (3, 4, 6, 8, 10), electric guitar (3, 4, 6, 8, 10)
- David Dorn – synthesizer (5), Hammond B-3 organ (5)
- Lee Hendricks – bass guitar (2)
- Steve Herrman – trumpet (7)
- Jim Horn – saxophone (7)
- Chris Janson – harmonica (7,11), lead vocals (all tracks)
- Doug Kahan – bass guitar (7)
- Troy Lancaster – electric guitar (7)
- Tim Lauer – keyboards (7)
- Tony Lucido – bass guitar (1, 3–6, 8–10, 12)
- Rob McNelley – electric guitar (7)
- Gordon Mote – keyboards (1, 9, 12), synthesized strings (1, 9, 12)
- Justin Ostrander – electric guitar (1–6, 8, 12)
- Russ Pahl – steel guitar (1, 3, 4, 6, 8–12)
- Danny Parks – acoustic guitar (7)
- Ben Phillips – drums (2, 5, 11), programming (2, 5)
- Jeff Roach – keyboards (1–4, 6, 8–12), synthesizer (5), programming (5)
- Jason Kyle Saetveit – background vocals (2, 11)
- Adam Shoenfeld – electric guitar (3, 4, 6, 8, 10)
- Ilya Toshinsky – acoustic guitar (1–4, 6, 8, 12), electric guitar (1, 9, 12), mandolin (2)
- Craig Wiseman – acoustic guitar (7), electric guitar (7), banjo (7)
- Nir Z – drums (1, 3, 4, 6–10, 12), percussion (1, 3, 4, 6, 8–10, 12), programming (1, 3, 4, 6, 8–10, 12)

=== Technical ===
All tracks except 2, 5, 7, 11

- Jeff Balding – recording
- Dave Cook – mixing assistant
- Matt Coles – production assistant
- Scott Hendricks – producer, recording, digital editing
- Jeff Juliano – mixing
- Brian David Willis – digital editing
- Nir Z – digital editing

On "Everybody"

- Chris Janson – producer
- Justin Ostrander – recording
- Ben Phillips – recording, digital editing, mixing
- Jason Kyle Saetveit – recording

On "Fix a Drink"

- Brent Anderson – producer
- Jeff Balding – recording
- Matt Coles – recording assistant
- Chris DuBois – producer
- Ben Phillips – recording, mixing, digital editing
- Dan Shike – mastering
- Lance "McGee" Van Dyke – recording assistant

On "Little Bit of Both"

- Jeff Balding – recording
- Dave Cook – mixing assistant
- Jim Cooley – recording
- Justin Francis – recording assistant
- Scott Hendricks – producer, recording, digital editing
- Jeff Juliano – mixing
- Craig Wiseman – producer
- Brian David Willis – digital editing

On "Redneck Life"

- Dave Cook – mixing assistant
- Scott Hendricks – producer, recording
- Chris Janson – producer
- Jeff Juliano – mixing
- Ben Phillips – recording, digital editing
- Jason Kyle Saetveit – recording, digital editing
- Chris Utley – recording
- Brian David Willis – digital editing

All tracks

- Scott Johnson – production assistant
- Andrew Mendelson – mastering

== Charts ==
Chart performance for Everybody
Chart (2017)	Peak position
US Billboard 200	53
US Top Country Albums (Billboard)	7
