= Feelin' It (Scotty McCreery song) =

Single by Scotty McCreery

from the album See You Tonight
- Released: April 14, 2014
- Recorded: 2013
- Genre: Country
- Length: 3:18
- Label: Mercury Nashville; 19
- Songwriter(s): Frank Rogers; Matthew West
- Producer(s): Frank Rogers

Scotty McCreery singles chronology
"See You Tonight" (2013)	"Feelin' It" (2014)	"Southern Belle" (2015)

"Feelin' It" is a song written by Frank Rogers and Matthew West, and recorded by American country music artist Scotty McCreery. The song is his fifth official single, and the second from his second studio album See You Tonight (2013).

== Critical reception ==
In a track-by-track review of See You Tonight for Billboard, Chuck Dauphin wrote that "the song has a definite contemporary sheen. It's probably not going to win any Song of the Year prizes, but it's just 3:19 of fun. Sometimes, that's as it should be!"

== Music video ==
The music video was directed by Roman White and filmed at the Outer Banks and Bodie Island, North Carolina.

== Chart performance ==
The song entered the Billboard Hot 100 at No. 96 on October 1, 2014. on has sold 293,000 copies in the US as of January 2015.

Chart (2014)	Peak position
Canada Country (Billboard)	46
US Billboard Hot 100	84
US Country Airplay (Billboard)	10
US Hot Country Songs (Billboard)	16

=== Year-end charts ===
Chart (2014)	Position
US Country Airplay (Billboard)	64
US Hot Country Songs (Billboard)	63

== Certifications ==
Region	Certification	Certified units/sales
United States (RIAA)	Gold	500,000^{‡}
^{‡} Sales+streaming figures based on certification alone.
