= This Is Country Music =

Studio album by Brad Paisley
- Released: May 23, 2011
- Studio: Blackbird (Nashville, Tennessee); Ocean Way (Nashville, Tennessee); Sound Emporium (Nashville, Tennessee); The Castle (Franklin, Tennessee); The PoolHouse (Nashville, Tennessee)
- Genre: Country
- Length: 64:49
- Label: Arista Nashville
- Producer: Frank Rogers

Brad Paisley chronology
Hits Alive (2010)	This Is Country Music (2011)	Wheelhouse (2013)

Singles from This Is Country Music
- 1. "This Is Country Music" Released: December 13, 2010; 2. "Old Alabama" Released: March 14, 2011; 3. "Remind Me" Released: May 23, 2011; 4. "Camouflage" Released: October 17, 2011

This Is Country Music is the ninth studio album by American country music artist Brad Paisley. The album was originally scheduled to be released April 19, but was pushed back to May 23, 2011, by recording label Arista Nashville.

== Content ==
Brad Paisley debuted the title track from the album on the 44th CMA Awards on November 10, 2010, and he received a standing ovation. This performance got Brad's fans excited for the release of his new album.

Brad Paisley wrote this album to pay tribute to various artists that have shaped his career. This includes Dick Dale for the song "Working on a Tan" and Ennio Morricone for the song "Eastwood". The majority of the songs were written or co-written by Brad Paisley, and are based on the themes of love, loss, hope, and heartache. The title track, This Is Country Music, starts off the album, and small verses of that song, that were not included in the original track, act as interludes between some of the songs. This ties the album to a common theme.

The album contains numerous collaborations with other artists, including Don Henley, Sheryl Crow, Blake Shelton, and Marty Stuart. Carrie Underwood also performs a duet titled "Remind Me", which is about a couple trying to regain their spark. Clint Eastwood contributes by whistling during an instrumental track called "Eastwood", which is named after him. Comedian Larry the Cable Guy uses his catchphrase "Git-R-Done" several times in the background, during the song "Camouflage". It was announced at Sony's annual boat show Country Radio Seminar that Brad would collaborate with Alabama for the song titled "Old Alabama" The song was the second single from the album. "Old Alabama" became the 19th #1 single for Brad The song was released to country radio on March 14, 2011. The third single, "Remind Me", is a duet with fellow country singer Carrie Underwood. The song hit number one and also became Paisley's biggest crossover hit, reaching number 17 on the all genres Billboard Hot 100 chart. "Camouflage" was released as the album fourth single. The song peaked at number 15 on Hot Country Songs chart, becoming Paisley's first single to miss the top 10 since Me Neither peaked at number 18 in mid 2000.

== Reception ==
=== Commercial ===
This Is Country Music debuted at number two on the U.S. Billboard 200, and sold 153,000 copies in the first week of release. Keith Caulfield with Billboard magazine noted that Paisley was at a disadvantage releasing the album the same week as Lady Gaga's Born This Way, which was expected to sell up to one million copies. Cualfield stated, "With all this talk about Gaga, you've got to feel a little bad for country superstar Brad Paisley, whose This Is Country Music album will likely debut in the runner-up slot next week with maybe 150,000 copies sold. Paisley has yet to earn a No. 1 album -- after six top 10s, two of which hit No. 2. (Had his new album come a week earlier, perhaps he could have secured his first No. 1.)" As of November 23, 2011, the album has sold 561,000 copies in the US.

=== Critical ===
Professional ratings
Review scores
Source	Rating
AllMusic	4/5 stars
Country Weekly	4/5 stars
Entertainment Weekly	A
The Guardian	4/5 stars
Los Angeles Times	2.5/4 stars
MSN Music (Expert Witness)	A−
PopMatters	8/10 stars
Rolling Stone	3.5/5 stars
Slant Magazine	3.5/5 stars
USA Today	4/4 stars

Upon its release, This Is Country Music received critical acclaim from music critics. At Metacritic, which assigns a normalized rating out of 100 to reviews from mainstream critics, the album received an average score of 82, based on 11 reviews. This indicates "universal acclaim". Chris Willman of Entertainment Weekly gave the release an 'A'. He stated that "the whole record plays like a best-of sampler — not just for Paisley, but for the history of the art form". Jody Rosen of The New York Times was in high praise of the album, saying "Mr. Paisley is once again preaching to his choir. It’s a bright, brisk record, packed with the polished country-pop songs that Mr. Paisley’s devotees have come to expect. It’s a study in the politics of 21st-century Nashville stardom, the delicate maneuvering that a performer like Mr. Paisley must do to keep his pews filled. But listen closely and you hear some surprises — and a more expansive definition of country music than the album’s title track at first suggests". In his consumer guide for MSN Music, critic Robert Christgau complimented Paisley's songcraft as "undiminished [...] he remains the smartest and nicest guy in his world", and gave the album an A− rating. indicating "the kind of garden-variety good record that is the great luxury of musical micromarketing and overproduction". Robert Silva of About.com gave the album four stars out of five and wrote that it "aims to cover all its musical bases", which is done with some "clever songwriting". In USA Today, Brian Mansfield gave it a positive review, and evoked how Paisley "set[s] a high standard" for himself, which the album is "steeped in the past and looking for ways to grow", and told "that it lives up to its title as well as any album in recent memory."

Jonathan Keefe of Slant Magazine called the album less satisfying than Paisley's previous albums, saying the album "threatens to become a great country album instead of an album simply about great country music. That's a distinction Paisley has gotten right more often than not over the course of his career [...] But even when the album isn't up to Paisley's typical standards, This Is Country Music is still an interesting, ambitious project from a man who need not apologize for the things he does awfully well." Giving it four stars out of five, Jessica Phillips of Country Weekly magazine praised the album's "traditional" sound and variety of songs. She also thought that the album's more comedic songs provided a "humorous equilibrium[…]without being relentlessly clever." Rolling Stone critic Will Hermes gave the album a 3½ star rating. Hermes thought the album "embraces all of what country music is today — its soul, its vivid storytelling, and, yes, its genre clichés. The lead singles, uncharacteristically, are ads more than songs; Elsewhere, the greatest country artist of his generation keeps it fresh, funny and guitar-heroic". Stuart Munro of The Boston Globe gave it a favorable review, saying "'This Is Country Music' encapsulates Paisley’s status as a premier upholder of traditional country within a contemporary framework, and the 15 songs that follow confirm that status; The sentiment here isn’t prescriptive but descriptive, in the self-referential manner that frequents today’s country [...] Yes, this is country music". At The Guardian, Angus Batey of The Guardian said that Paisley "has fun with country's cliches, but still treats the genre seriously", which is why "he remains the Nashville mainstream's most potent ambassador."

Stephen Thomas Erlewine from AllMusic gave it a favorable review. Erelwine stated that "Paisley narrows his definition of what constitutes modern country on his seventh collection of new songs [..] here’s where Paisley’s skills as a craftsman come into play. Always a traditionalist, he builds a song with care but is keenly aware that he’s living in 2011, not 1965". Emily Yahr of The Washington Post gave the release a favorable review, saying "While it’s an enjoyable listen, there are no real surprises — at this point, Paisley knows what works. And by the time the western actor shows up to guest-whistle his way through an instrumental track appropriately called “Eastwood,” it's clear that Paisley has tackled so many topics and sounds that he thinks country music is . . . well, pretty much whatever you want it to be". Dan MacIntosh of Roughstock gave the album a four star rating. He believes that "buying new music can sometimes be a gamble. However, Brad Paisley is the closest artist to a sure thing that you’ll likely find. This is country music – at its best". Randy Lewis of the Los Angeles Times gave it a 2½ out of 4 star rating, calling a lot of the material "overworked". Lewis explained that "[Brad's] skills as a songwriter, guitarist extraordinaire and distinctively expressive singer are obvious at many turns on his latest album. But on this outing Paisley doesn’t move the musical conversation forward the way he’s done in several previous albums". Deborah Evans Price of Billboard called the album "musically diverse" and commented by saying that "vocally, Paisley has never sounded better, and the ace guitar player struts his stuff throughout, skillfully complementing the mood and timbre of each tune. Country music's most talented young ambassador has delivered the ultimate love letter to his art form with This is Country Music".

== Track listing ==
No.	Title	Writer(s)	Length
1.	"This Is Country Music"	Brad Paisley; Chris DuBois	5:14
2.	"Old Alabama" (featuring Alabama)	Paisley; DuBois; Dave Turnbull; Randy Owen	5:02
3.	"A Man Don't Have to Die"	Rivers Rutherford; George Teren; Josh Thompson	4:19
4.	"Camouflage"	Paisley; DuBois; Kelley Lovelace	4:26
5.	"Remind Me" (featuring Carrie Underwood)	Paisley; DuBois; Lovelace	4:32
6.	"Working on a Tan"	Paisley; DuBois; Lovelace	4:04
7.	"Love Her Like She's Leavin'" (featuring Don Henley)	Paisley; DuBois; Ashley Gorley	4:09
8.	"One of Those Lives"	Paisley; Lovelace; Lee Thomas Miller	4:13
9.	"Toothbrush"	Jon Henderson; Joel Shewmake; Danny Simpson	3:09
10.	"Be the Lake"	Paisley; DuBois; Gorley	3:56
11.	"Eastwood" (instrumental with a spoken intro featuring Clint Eastwood, William "Huck" Paisley and Jasper Paisley)	Paisley; Kendal Marcy; Robert Arthur	5:02
12.	"New Favorite Memory"	Paisley; Arthur; Frank Rogers	4:11
13.	"Don't Drink the Water" (featuring Blake Shelton)	Paisley; Tim Owens	3:46
14.	"I Do Now"	Paisley; DuBois; Owens	4:00
15.	"Life's Railway to Heaven" (featuring Marty Stuart, Sheryl Crow and Carl Jackson)	Traditional	4:52
Total length:			64:49

== Personnel ==
Credits for This Is Country Music adapted from AllMusic.

Musicians

- Robert Arthur – acoustic guitar
- Carrie Bailey – violin
- Jim "Moose" Brown – Hammond B3, keyboards, piano, vocal group
- Jeff Cook – rhythm guitar, vocals
- Susanna Cranford – vocal group
- Sheryl Crow – background vocals
- Randle Currie – steel guitar, vocal group
- Eric Darken – percussion
- David Davidson – violin
- Chris Dowis – vocal group
- Clint Eastwood – whistle
- Connie Ellisor – violin
- Teddy Gentry – vocals
- Kevin Grantt – upright bass
- Jim Grosjean – viola
- Erin Hall – violin
- Tania Hancheroff – background vocals
- Don Henley – background vocals
- Wes Hightower – background vocals
- Gary Hooker – acoustic and rhythm guitar
- Sonya Isaacs – background vocals
- Carl Jackson – banjo, background vocals
- Mike Johnson – dobro
- Anthony LaMarchina – cello
- Betsy Lamb – viola
- Larry the Cable Guy – vocal
- Kendall Marcy – banjo, mando, overdub engineer, vocal group
- Carl Marsh – string arrangements
- Gordon Mote – Hammond B3, piano, wurlitzer
- Kimberly Mote – vocal group
- Samantha Mote – vocal group
- Mary Kathryn Vanosdale – violin
- Randy Owen – rhythm guitar, vocals
- Brad Paisley – lead vocals, lead guitar, acoustic guitar
- Huck Paisley – vocals
- Jasper Paisley – vocals
- Sari Reist – cello
- Ben Sesar – drums, vocal group
- Pam Sixfin – violin
- Marty Stuart – mandolin, background vocals
- Russell Terrell – background vocals
- Carrie Underwood – duet
- Chad Weaver – vocal group
- Justin Williamson – fiddle, vocal group
- Karen Winkelmann – string contractor

Technical

- Jeff Balding – overdub engineer
- Brady Barnett – digital editing
- Richard Barrow – digital editing, engineer, overdub engineer, vocal group
- Tracy Baskette-Fleaner – art direction, package design
- Drew Bollman – overdub engineer
- Neal Cappellino – digital editing, overdub engineer
- Jim Catino – A&R
- Tammie Harris Cleek – imaging, photo production
- Judy Forde-Blair – creative producer, liner notes
- Jennifer Kemp – stylist
- Jason Lehning – overdub engineer
- Scott McDaniel – cover design, creative director
- Tyler Moles – digital editing
- Rich Ramsey – assistant
- Lowell Reynolds – assistant
- Mellissa Schleicher – grooming
- David Schoeber – engineer
- Jim Shea – photography
- Phillip Stein – digital editing, production assistant
- Hank Williams – mastering
- Brian Willis – digital editing
- Brian David Willis – engineer, overdub engineer, vocal group
- Luke Wooten – mixing

== Charts and certifications ==
=== Weekly charts ===
Chart (2011)	Peak position
Australian Albums (ARIA)	26
Australian Country Albums (ARIA)	2
Canadian Albums (Billboard)	3
Irish Albums (IRMA)	100
Norwegian Albums (VG-lista)	3
Scottish Albums (OCC)	91
Swedish Albums (Sverigetopplistan)	42
Swiss Albums (Schweizer Hitparade)	45
UK Albums (OCC)	86
UK Country Albums (OCC)	2
US Billboard 200	2
US Top Country Albums (Billboard)	1

=== Year-end charts ===
Chart (2011)	Position
US Billboard 200	46
US Top Country Albums (Billboard)	11
Chart (2012)	Position
US Top Country Albums (Billboard)	31

=== Certifications ===
Region	Certification
United States (RIAA)	Gold

=== Singles ===
Year	Single	Peak chart positions		
Year	Single	US Country	US	CAN
2010	"This Is Country Music"	2	58	67
2011	"Old Alabama" (with Alabama)	1	38	41
2011	"Remind Me" (with Carrie Underwood)	1	17	33
2011	"Camouflage"	15	87	—
"—" denotes releases that did not chart
