= See You Tonight (song) =

Single by Scotty McCreery

from the album See You Tonight
- Released: April 9, 2013
- Recorded: 2013
- Genre: Country
- Length: 3:46
- Label: Mercury Nashville; 19
- Songwriters: Scotty McCreery; Ashley Gorley; Zach Crowell
- Producer: Frank Rogers

Scotty McCreery singles chronology
"Water Tower Town" (2012)	"See You Tonight" (2013)	"Feelin' It" (2014)

"See You Tonight" is a song co-written and recorded by American country music singer Scotty McCreery. It is his fourth official single, and the first from his second studio album, also titled of the same name.

== Content ==
Written by McCreery along with Ashley Gorley and Zach Crowell, the song is about a male who goes to visit his girlfriend because he has to "see [her] tonight," as substitutes like phone calls and pictures are not enough.

== Critical reception ==
Giving it 3.5 stars out of 5, Billy Dukes of Taste of Country said that McCreery "has never sounded more comfortable". He also wrote that the lyrics "rely a little too heavily on overused country images like deep kisses under the moonlight to make it a Song of the Year contender, but his verses are miles from cliche." Matt Bjorke of Roughstock rated it 4 out of 5 stars, saying that the song "is youthful without feeling overtly so. The production from Frank Rogers is modern without being in your face about it. It's fresh, it's current."

== Music video ==
The music video premiered in September 2013. Roman White directed the music video.

== Chart and sales performance ==
The song debuted at No. 94 on the Billboard Hot 100 chart with sales of 46,000. It also entered at No 14 on the Hot Country Songs, and No. 43 on the Hot Digital Songs chart. The song was slow to gain traction on the radio, but on the debut of the album on October 15, 2013, it re-entered the Hot 100 chart at No. 93 on the Billboard chart. It then fell off Hot 100 chart, but again re-entered the chart at No. 86 in December 2013 with increasing radio spins and sales.

The song was his first Top Ten hit on the country charts. On the Billboard Country Airplay chart, McCreery's song has the second-longest top 10 climb in the chart's 24-year-history at 44 weeks. The song was certified Gold on February 14, 2014. As of May 2014, the song has sold 693,000 copies in the US.

== Charts and certifications ==
=== Weekly charts ===
Chart (2013–2014)	Peak position
Canada Country (Billboard)	34
US Billboard Hot 100	52
US Hot Country Songs (Billboard)	10
US Country Airplay (Billboard)	8

=== Year-end charts ===
Chart (2013)	Position
US Country Airplay (Billboard)	90
US Hot Country Songs (Billboard)	80

Chart (2014)	Position
US Country Airplay (Billboard)	56
US Hot Country Songs (Billboard)	66

=== Certifications ===
Region	Certification	Certified units/sales
United States (RIAA)	Platinum	656,000
