= Drunk Girl =

Single by Chris Janson

from the album Everybody
- Released: December 11, 2017
- Genre: Country
- Length: 3:27
- Label: Warner Bros. Nashville
- Songwriter(s): Chris Janson; Tom Douglas; Scooter Carusoe
- Producer(s): Scott Hendricks

Chris Janson singles chronology
"Fix a Drink" (2017)	"Drunk Girl" (2017)	"Good Vibes" (2019)

"Drunk Girl" is a song recorded by American country music singer Chris Janson. Written by him along with Tom Douglas and Scooter Carusoe, it is the second single from his album Everybody. The song is about men showing respect to women, with a particular focus on a young woman who has become intoxicated.

== Content ==
Tom Douglas presented Janson and Carusoe with the idea of the song, which is a piano ballad with a central theme of treating females with respect. Specifically, the song tells of taking a woman home to her house after she has had too much to drink, in order to keep her safe.

Janson said that the inspiration behind the song came from him seeing news stories of victimized women. He told Rolling Stone Country, "It's teaching the younger generation of men that this is probably the better way to treat a girl...instead of ‘let’s get drunk and hook up.' It's written from a man's perspective, and from a father’s perspective. If my daughters were in that situation, I hope someone would treat them with that respect." He also said that since he and the other two writers are fathers, they chose to apply a "father's perspective"; he also noted that the song received emotional responses from fans in concert before it had even been released as a single, saying that such a reaction "almost means more to me than getting played on the air". Originally, Janson wanted Tim McGraw to record the song, but chose to keep it to himself after his wife, Kelly, persuaded him.

The song is in the key of C major with an approximate tempo of 100 beats per minute. It follows the chord pattern C-G/B-Am7-F.

== Commercial performance ==
The song has sold 180,000 copies in the United States as of November 2018.

== Music video ==
Jeff Venable directed the song's music video, which was filmed along Lower Broadway in downtown Nashville, Tennessee. To film the video, Venable got permission from the city to shut down the street and all businesses on it, leaving an empty streetscape on which Janson performs the song from behind a baby grand piano. In between the shots, the video tells a story of a young intoxicated woman leaving a bar, along with flashbacks of her witnessing abuse as a child, and being victimized as a student. The video is preceded by a content warning stating that its "content addresses sensitive topics that might be upsetting to some audiences". Janson said that he cried when he saw the video for the first time.

The music video won the Video of the Year award at the 54th Academy of Country Music Awards.

== Charts ==
=== Weekly charts ===
Chart (2017–2018)	Peak position
Canada Country (Billboard)	25
US Billboard Hot 100	79
US Country Airplay (Billboard)	7
US Hot Country Songs (Billboard)	12

=== Year-end charts ===
Chart (2018)	Position
US Country Airplay (Billboard)	17
US Hot Country Songs (Billboard)	18

== Certifications ==
Region	Certification	Certified units/sales
United States (RIAA)	Platinum	1,000,000^{‡}
^{‡} Sales+streaming figures based on certification alone.
