= 'Til a Woman Comes Along =

Single by Chris Janson

from the album Take It to the Bank
- Released: April 5, 2010
- Genre: Country
- Length: 3:30
- Label: BNA
- Songwriter(s): Cole Deggs; Chris Janson; Phil O'Donnell
- Producer(s): Phil O'Donnell

Chris Janson singles chronology
"'Til a Woman Comes Along" (2010)	"Better I Don't" (2013)

"'Til a Woman Comes Along" is the debut single of American country music singer Chris Janson. Janson co-wrote the song with Cole Deggs and Philip Eugene O'Donnell.

== Critical reception ==
Matt Bjorke of Roughstock gave the song a positive review, saying that "The story here is real and authentic and Chris Janson's vocal (a deep baritone with some grit) adds the right amount of swagger to the tune. The instrumental solos are strong and Chris Janson's harmonica solo is a highlight as well."

== Music video ==
The music video was directed by Chris Hicky and premiered in May 2010.

== Chart performance ==
The song debuted at No. 56 on the Billboard Hot Country Songs charts dated for the week ending May 1, 2010.

Chart (2010)	Peak position
US Hot Country Songs (Billboard)	52
