= Remind Me (Brad Paisley and Carrie Underwood song) =

Single by Brad Paisley with Carrie Underwood

from the album This Is Country Music
- Released: May 23, 2011
- Recorded: February 9, 2011
- Genre: Country
- Length: 4:32 (album version); 4:14 (single version)
- Label: Arista Nashville
- Songwriter(s): Brad Paisley; Chris DuBois; Kelley Lovelace
- Producer(s): Frank Rogers

Brad Paisley singles chronology
"Old Alabama" (2011)	"Remind Me" (2011)	"Camouflage" (2011)

Carrie Underwood singles chronology
"There's a Place for Us" (2010)	"Remind Me" (2011)	"Good Girl" (2012)

Music video
- "Remind Me" on YouTube

"Remind Me" is a song co-written and recorded by American country music singer Brad Paisley, performed as a duet with Carrie Underwood. It was released in May 2011 as the third single from Paisley's album This Is Country Music (2011). The music video for the song premiered on CMT on July 26, 2011. The song was also named Taste of Country's Song of The Year for 2011. Paisley wrote this song with Kelley Lovelace and Chris DuBois.

== Background ==
In an interview at the Billboard Country Music Summit in June 2011, Underwood described the recording of the song as "the most unorganized thing [she] had ever been a part of" but added that it "all worked out so perfectly." She and Paisley had previously discussed recording a duet for This Is Country Music but couldn't coordinate their schedules before the album was due to be completed in December 2010. The album was pushed back and Paisley contacted Underwood in February 2011, sending her a work tape of "Remind Me" with "a lot of mumbling" and Sheryl Crow singing the female part. Underwood saw potential in the song and flew from Los Angeles to Nashville to meet with Paisley, where they recorded the song on February 11, 2011. Upon the album's release in May 2011, Paisley expressed his hope that "Remind Me" would be its third single and described the decision to ask Underwood to perform on the song with him as an easy one.

In May 2013, songwriter Amy Bowen filed a $10 million lawsuit against the song's writers, claiming that they had stolen the idea from a song that she wrote in 2007.

== Content ==
The song's topic is about a married couple in seek of rekindling the flame of their relationship they once carried. It is set at a slow tempo of 69 beats per minute in the key of F major, with a vocal range from F3 to A5 and a primary chord pattern of F-Dm-C-B♭.

== Critical reception ==
The duet has been met with favorable reviews. Dan Milliken of Country Universe gave the song a B rating, saying the song is "loaded with potential" but "trying too hard to be a big event." It received a five-out-of-five star rating from Billy Dukes of Taste of Country, who says "Underwood's vocals are pristine, and Paisley does more than enough to keep up." Bobby Peacock of Roughstock gave the song a 4.5 out of 5 stars, saying that "it's hard to find a good vocal match for Carrie, but no matter how much she tries to dial herself down, her powerhouse voice still makes Brad's very limited range all the more obvious. But that's a small complaint for an otherwise-excellent song." Zimbio gave the song five stars out five, saying that "You can actually feel the longing and the pain in both Brad and Carrie’s vocals throughout the single. The lyrics are well written, and lets you actually picture the memories they are talking about" and stated the duet is a potential Number One.

== Commercial performance ==
"Remind Me" entered the Hot Country Songs charts at number 36 on the chart dated for the week ending May 26, 2011. The duet also debuted at number 59 on the Billboard Hot 100 chart, for the week of June 16, 2011 and debuted at number 78 on the Canadian Hot 100. The song reached the top of the Hot Country Songs chart. It sold 42,000 digital copies in its first week. At number 17, it is Paisley's highest ranking song on the Billboard Hot 100.

The song was certified 2× Platinum by the Recording Industry Association of America on September 30, 2013, and has sold 2,152,000 copies as of January 2016.

== Music video ==
The music video for Remind Me was filmed on June 27, 2011, at El Mirage Lake, California. Deaton-Flanigen directed the video.

It shows Brad Paisley and Carrie Underwood walking towards each other in the desert while they sing the song for each other. She is wearing a floral dress and he is wearing a shirt, jeans and a white cowboy hat. The desert represents their actual relationship like a barrel by walking towards each other is like they are trying to rekindle the relationship. In the end, they are finally face-to-face. This open end leaves up in the air if they will remind each other, just like the song.

== Awards and nominations ==
=== Academy of Country Music Awards ===
Year	Nominee / work	Award	Result
2012	"Remind Me"	Vocal Collaboration of the Year	Nominated

=== American Country Awards ===
Year	Nominee / work	Award	Result
2012	"Remind Me"	Collaborative Music Video of the Year	Won

=== ASCAP Awards ===
Year	Nominee / work	Award	Result
2012	"Remind Me"	Most Performed Song of the Year	Won

=== CMT Music Awards ===
Year	Nominee / work	Award	Result
2012	"Remind Me"	Video of the Year	Nominated
2012	"Remind Me"	Collaborative Video of the Year	Won

== Charts and certifications ==
=== Peak positions ===
Chart (2011)	Peak position
Canada (Canadian Hot 100)	33
Canada Country (Billboard)	1
US Billboard Hot 100	17
US Hot Country Songs (Billboard)	1

=== Year-end charts ===
Chart (2011)	Position
U.S. Billboard Hot 100	82
U.S. Country Songs (Billboard)	26

=== Certifications ===
Region	Certification	Certified units/sales
United States (RIAA)	2× Platinum	2,152,000
