= Done (Chris Janson song) =

Single by Chris Janson

from the album Real Friends
- Released: November 25, 2019
- Genre: Country
- Length: 3:40
- Label: Warner Nashville
- Songwriter(s): Chris Janson; Mitch Oglesby; Jamie Paulin; Matt Roy
- Producer(s): Chris Janson; Tommy Cecil

Chris Janson singles chronology
"Good Vibes" (2019)	"Done" (2019)	"Waitin' on 5" (2020)

"Done" is a song recorded by American country music singer Chris Janson. It is the second single from his 2019 album Real Friends. Janson wrote the song with Mitch Oglesby, Jamie Paulin, and Matt Roy.

== History ==
According to Janson, the song was inspired by his wife, Kelly Lynn. He told the blog Taste of Country that it was his "favorite song [he'd] ever written", and that he wrote it with the intention of making a love song that was more upbeat than other ones he had written.

Mitch Oglesby, one of the song's writers, presented Janson with the song's concept during a songwriting session after noting that Janson had a tendency to say "done" whenever he was "serious about something". According to Janson, he also said this phrase when he met Kelly Lynn for the first time at a bar. Janson also told Rolling Stone that he felt the song would be a "turning point" in his career as well, calling its sound a "mid-nineties down-the-middle-of-the-road hit".

== Chart performance ==
=== Weekly charts ===
Chart (2019–2020)	Peak position
Canada (Canadian Hot 100)	84
Canada Country (Billboard)	3
US Billboard Hot 100	41
US Country Airplay (Billboard)	1
US Hot Country Songs (Billboard)	8

=== Year-end charts ===
Chart (2020)	Position
US Country Airplay (Billboard)	23
US Hot Country Songs (Billboard)	43

== Certifications ==
Region	Certification	Certified units/sales
United States (RIAA)	Gold	500,000^{‡}
^{‡} Sales+streaming figures based on certification alone.
