= All I Need Is You (Chris Janson song) =

Single by Chris Janson

from the album The Outlaw Side of Me
- Released: February 20, 2023
- Genre: Country
- Length: 2:42
- Label: BMLG/Harpeth 60
- Songwriters: Ashley Gorley; Brad Clawson; Chris Janson; Mitch Oglesby
- Producers: Chris Janson; Julian Raymond

Chris Janson singles chronology
"Keys to the Country" (2022)	"All I Need Is You" (2023)	"Whatcha See Is Whatcha Get" (2024)

"All I Need Is You" is a song by American country music singer Chris Janson. It was released on February 20, 2023 as the lead single from Janson's fifth studio album The Outlaw Side of Me.

== History ==
In May 2023, Chris Janson announced the release of his fifth studio album The Outlaw Side of Me. It is his first album for Big Machine Records in association with Janson's own label, Harpeth 60. The album was released June 26, 2023, with Janson and Julian Raymond co-producing. "All I Need Is You" was the project's first single.

Janson also co-wrote the song, doing so with Ashley Gorley, Brad Clawson, and Mitch Oglesby over a Zoom meeting at his family's house in the Florida Panhandle. According to CMT, Janson drew the song's central idea from a comment about how "remarkable" he considered his wife, Kelly.

== Charts ==
=== Weekly charts ===
Weekly chart performance for "All I Need Is You"
Chart (2023–2024)	Peak position
Canada Country (Billboard)	20
US Billboard Hot 100	98
US Country Airplay (Billboard)	3
US Hot Country Songs (Billboard)	26

=== Year-end charts ===
2024 year-end chart performance for "All I Need Is You"
Chart (2024)	Position
US Country Airplay (Billboard)	43
US Hot Country Songs (Billboard)	90
