= Camouflage (Brad Paisley song) =

Single by Brad Paisley

from the album This Is Country Music
- Released: October 17, 2011
- Genre: Country
- Length: 4:26 (album version); 3:32 (single version)
- Label: Arista Nashville
- Songwriter: Chris DuBois; Kelley Lovelace; Brad Paisley
- Producer: Frank Rogers

Brad Paisley singles chronology
"Remind Me" (2011)	"Camouflage" (2011)	"Southern Comfort Zone" (2012)

"Camouflage" is a song co-written and recorded by American country music artist Brad Paisley. It was released in October 2011 as the fourth and final single from his 2011 album This Is Country Music. Paisley co-wrote this song with Chris DuBois and Kelley Lovelace.

== Content ==
"Camouflage" is a novelty song in which the narrator praises camouflage. In it, he recalls its use on a friend's car in high school, on prom tuxedos and in hunting.

== Critical reception ==
Bobby Peacock of Roughstock gave "Camouflage" a four-out-of-five star rating, saying that it sounds "a little heavier and more rowdy than previous Paisley songs," also praising the "sharp and witty lyrics". Kevin John Cayne, reviewing for Country Universe, gave the song a grade of D, calling the song's humor "indetectable."

== Chart performance ==
"Camouflage" debuted at number 51 on the country chart dated October 15, 2011, and debuted at number 100 on the U.S. Billboard Hot 100 chart for the week of December 17, 2011. "Camouflage" peaked at number fifteen on the country chart in December 2011, becoming Paisley's first single to miss the Top Ten since "Me Neither" in 2000.

Chart (2011–2012)	Peak position
Canada Country (Billboard)	11
US Hot Country Songs (Billboard)	15
US Billboard Hot 100	87

=== Year-end charts ===
Chart (2012)	Position
US Country Songs (Billboard)	64
