= Old Alabama =

Single by Brad Paisley featuring Alabama

from the album This Is Country Music
- Released: March 14, 2011
- Recorded: 2010–2011
- Genre: Country, bluegrass
- Length: 5:02 (album version): 4:35 (without album outro); 4:12 (radio edit)
- Label: Arista Nashville
- Songwriters: Brad Paisley, Chris DuBois, Dave Turnbull, Randy Owen
- Producer: Frank Rogers

Brad Paisley singles chronology
"This Is Country Music" (2010)	"Old Alabama" (2011)	"Remind Me" (2011)

Alabama singles chronology
"Are You Sure Hank Done It This Way" (2010)	"Old Alabama" (2011)	"Wasn't Through Lovin' You Yet" (2015)

"Old Alabama" is a song co-written and recorded by American country music singer Brad Paisley, featuring guest vocals from the band Alabama. It was released in March 2011 as second single from Paisley's 2011 album This Is Country Music.

== Content ==
When writing the song, Paisley thought that the bridge to Alabama's 1982 single "Mountain Music" would fit well with the song. Instead of sampling that song, he asked band members Randy Owen, Jeff Cook and Teddy Gentry to join him in the studio and record a piece of it. Paisley wrote the song with Owen, Dave Turnbull and Chris DuBois.

"Old Alabama" incorporates into its lyrics the titles of several of Alabama's classic songs, including "Why Lady Why," "Tennessee River," "Feels So Right," "Love in the First Degree" and "Dixieland Delight." A man's illustration of his idea of spending time with a desirable woman on a Saturday night, the song references the names of Alabama songs that the couple are listening to on their way to an unnamed rendezvous. In the song's bridge, Owen, Cook and Gentry sing the bridge of "Mountain Music," in fact the same parts they did on their original 1982 hit. The song ends with a fiddle-heavy reprisal of "Old Alabama"'s refrain, which is musically in the vein of "Mountain Music."

== Critical reception ==
Matt Bjorke of Roughstock rated the single three-and-a-half stars out of five, saying that the references to Alabama songs were "cleverly intertwined" and that the appearance of Alabama gave the song a "nostalgia" factor. Blake Boldt of Engine 145 thought that the tributes to the band Alabama were "admirable", but criticized the melody for sounding similar to his 2007 single "Online" and thought that it "leans heavily […] on song mentions and recycled production."

== Music video ==
The music video was directed by Jim Shea and premiered in May 2011. The video features the group Alabama, showing clips from their previous music videos as Paisley is superimposed, along with appearances from NASCAR drivers, Darrell Waltrip, Jeff Gordon, and team owners Rick Hendrick and Kelley Earnhardt Miller. The video was filmed in and around Charlotte, North Carolina.

== Chart performance ==
"Old Alabama" entered the Hot Country Songs charts at number 44 on the chart dated for the week ending March 26, 2011. It has since become Alabama's first new number one hit since "Reckless" in 1993. It is also the seventeenth number one for Paisley.

Chart (2011)	Peak position
Canada Country (Billboard)	1
Canada Hot 100 (Billboard)	41
US Billboard Hot 100	38
US Hot Country Songs (Billboard)	1

=== Year-end charts ===
Chart (2011)	Position
US Country Songs (Billboard)	41

== Certifications ==
Region	Certification	Certified units/sales
United States (RIAA)	Platinum	1,000,000^{‡}
^{‡} Sales+streaming figures based on certification alone.
