= Better I Don't =

Single by Chris Janson

from the EP Chris Janson
- Released: January 21, 2013
- Genre: Country
- Length: 3:26
- Label: Bigger Picture Music Group
- Songwriter(s): Chris Janson; Pat Bunch; Kelly Roland
- Producer(s): Keith Stegall

Chris Janson singles chronology
| "'Til a Woman Comes Along" (2010) | "Better I Don't" (2013) | "Cut Me Some Slack" (2013) |

"Better I Don't" is a song recorded by American country music singer Chris Janson. Janson co-wrote the song with Pat Bunch and Kelly Roland.

== Critical reception ==
Billy Dukes of Taste of Country gave the song a positive review, saying that "Janson’s producer pulls all the elements together for one sweet, smooth ride. The scathing harmonica solo near the bridge almost gets lost upon first listen. So too does the steel guitar that reminds one where Janson’s loyalties lie. It’s a masterful mix that dazzles even before the second verse."

== Music video ==
The music video was directed by Wes Edwards and premiered in March 2013.

== Chart performance ==
| Chart (2013) | Peak position |
|---|---|
| US Country Airplay (Billboard) | 40 |
