= Take It to the Bank =

EP by Chris Janson
- Released: February 25, 2014
- Genre: Country
- Length: 17:57
- Label: Columbia Nashville
- Producer: Phil O'Donnell

Chris Janson chronology
Chris Janson (2013)	Take It to the Bank (2014)	Buy Me a Boat (2015)

Singles from Take It to the Bank
- 1. "'Til a Woman Comes Along" Released: April 5, 2010

Take It to the Bank is the second EP by American country music artist Chris Janson. It was released on February 25, 2014 via Columbia Nashville. The album includes material that Janson recorded while signed to the former BNA Records.

== Critical reception ==
Jon Freeman of Nash Country Weekly gave the album a positive review, praising the songs "'Til a Woman Comes Along", "Back to Me", and "I Ain't Livin' Long Like This", but criticizing the song "Where My Girls At" and comparing it to She's Country by Jason Aldean. Matt Bjorke of Roughstock also reviewed the album favorably, saying that "If one wants to know the musical evolution of Chris Janson, Take It To The Bank is an essential part of that journey and something his fans should be thankful to have available to buy and add to their collections."

== Track listing ==
Sources: Minnesota Country and Microsoft Store.

No.	Title	Writer(s)	Length
1.	"Take It to the Bank"	Chris Janson; Cole Deggs	3:43
2.	"'Til a Woman Comes Along"	Deggs; Janson; Phil O'Donnell	3:31
3.	"Back to Me"	Janson; Deggs	3:23
4.	"Where My Girls At"	Janson; Dallas Davidson	3:07
5.	"I Ain't Livin' Long Like This"	Rodney Crowell	4:13
Total length:			17:57
