= Real Friends (Chris Janson album) =

Studio album by Chris Janson
- Released: October 18, 2019
- Genre: Country
- Length: 38:39
- Label: Warner Nashville
- Producer: Chris Janson; Tommy Cecil; Brock Berryhill; Zach Crowell

Chris Janson chronology
Everybody (2017)	Real Friends (2019)	All In (2022)

Singles from Real Friends
- 1. "Good Vibes" Released: February 8, 2019; 2. "Done" Released: November 25, 2019; 3. "Waitin' on 5" Released: September 14, 2020

Real Friends is the third studio album by American country music singer Chris Janson. It was released via Warner Records Nashville on October 18, 2019. The album contains the singles "Good Vibes" and "Done" and "Waitin' on 5".

== Content ==
Janson produced the album with Tommy Cecil, Brock Berryhill, and Zach Crowell, who also co-wrote tracks on the album. It is also Cecil's first production credit. Blake Shelton sings duet vocals on the title track. Janson said that he wanted the album to have a positive theme, and told Billboard that "We wrote it with a positive narrative and tone all the way through."

"Hawaii on Me" was later recorded by Joe Nichols for his 2022 album Good Day for Living.

== Critical reception ==
Rating it 3.5 out of 5 stars, Stephen Thomas Erlewine of AllMusic said of the album that it was "a cheerful, breezy affair, filled with reassuring ballads and party tunes that mindfully avoid pressing the pedal to the metal."

== Commercial performance ==
The album debuted at No. 12 on Billboard's Top Country Albums with 3,400 copies sold. It has sold 9,900 copies in the United States as of March 2020.

== Track listing ==
No.	Title	Writer(s)	Length
1.	"Good Vibes"	Chris Janson; Zach Crowell; Ashley Gorley	2:44
2.	"Check"	Janson; Tommy Cecil; Greylan James; James McNair; Mitch Oglesby	2:43
3.	"Done"	Janson; Oglesby; Jamie Paulin; Matt Roy	3:40
4.	"Normal People"	Janson; Crowell; Cecil	2:56
5.	"Say About Me"	Janson; Shy Carter; Cecil	3:00
6.	"Waitin' on 5"	Janson; Carter; Cecil; Craig Wiseman	2:54
7.	"Hawaii on Me"	Janson; Kelly Roland; Wil Nance	3:12
8.	"Mine Does"	Janson; Rhett Akins; Ben Hayslip	3:13
9.	"God’s Gotta Be a Good Ole Boy"	Janson; Brock Berryhill; Brad Clawson; Greylan James; Oglesby	2:50
10.	"Real Friends" (featuring Blake Shelton)	Janson; Clawson; James; Oglesby	3:06
11.	"Everybody’s Going Through Something"	Janson; Tom Douglas; Tony Lane	2:47
12.	"Beer Me"	Janson; Berryhill; Jason Blaine; Jay Brunswick; Oglesby	2:40
13.	"Country USA"	Janson; David Lee Murphy; Oglesby	2:54

== Personnel ==
Credits by AllMusic

- Matt Alderman – background vocals
- Brock Berryhill – bass guitar, acoustic guitar, electric guitar, keyboards, programming, background vocals
- Jason Blaine – electric guitar
- Shy Carter – background vocals
- Ben Caver – background vocals
- Tommy Cecil – percussion, programming, background vocals
- Zach Crowell – acoustic guitar, electric guitar, keyboards, programming, background vocals
- Josh Dunne – background vocals
- Jerry Flowers – bass guitar
- Scotty Huff – horn arrangements, trumpet
- Evan Hutchings – drums, percussion
- Greylon James – bass guitar, electric guitar, steel guitar
- Chel Janson – background vocals
- Chris Janson – gut string guitar, lead vocals, background vocals
- Georgia Janson – background vocals
- Jesse Janson – background vocals
- Devin Malone – banjo, dobro, acoustic guitar, electric guitar, steel guitar
- James McNair – background vocals
- Jovan Quallo – baritone saxophone, tenor saxophone
- Josh Scalf – trombone
- Justin Schipper – banjo, dobro, acoustic guitar, electric guitar, steel guitar, mandolin, slide guitar
- Isaac Senty – drums, cowbell
- Blake Shelton – duet vocals on "Real Friends"
- Jonathan Singleton – background vocals
- Aaron Sterling – drums, percussion, piano
- Tim Galloway – banjo, bass guitar, bouzouki, acoustic guitar, baritone guitar, electric guitar, hi-string guitar, ukulele, background vocals
- Brad Winters – background vocals
- Alex Wright – clavinet, Hammond B-3 organ, omnichord, piano, synthesizer, Wurlitzer

== Charts ==
Chart performance for Real Friends
Chart (2019)	Peak position
Australian Digital Albums (ARIA)	41
US Top Country Albums (Billboard)	12
US Billboard 200	110
