= Holdin' Her =

Single by Chris Janson

from the album Buy Me a Boat
- Released: May 2, 2016
- Genre: Country
- Length: 4:05
- Label: Warner Bros. Nashville
- Songwriter(s): Chris Janson; James Otto
- Producer(s): Byron Gallimore

Chris Janson singles chronology
"Power of Positive Drinkin'" (2015)	"Holdin' Her" (2016)	"Fix a Drink" (2017)

"Holdin' Her" is a song recorded by American country music singer Chris Janson. It was released in May 2016 the third single from his album Buy Me a Boat, which was released in late October 2015. Janson co-wrote the song with James Otto.

== Critical reception ==
The song debuted on the Country Airplay chart at No. 58 for chart dated May 21, 2016, but did not enter the Hot Country Songs chart until September 10, 2016. It has sold 168,000 copies in the United States as of March 2017.

== Music video ==
The music video was directed by Edgar Esteves and premiered in April 2016.

== Chart performance ==
=== Weekly charts ===
Chart (2016–2017)	Peak position
US Bubbling Under Hot 100 Singles (Billboard)	15
US Country Airplay (Billboard)	20
US Hot Country Songs (Billboard)	25

=== Year-end charts ===
Chart (2017)	Position
US Hot Country Songs (Billboard)	87

== Certifications ==
Region	Certification	Certified units/sales
United States (RIAA)	Gold	500,000^{‡}
^{‡} Sales+streaming figures based on certification alone.
