= Brent Anderson (singer) =

American country music singer

- Born: ca. 1988; Pascagoula, Mississippi
- Origin: Nashville, Tennessee
- Genres: Country
- Occupation: Singer-songwriter
- Instruments: Vocals, guitar, bass guitar
- Years active: 2011–present
- Label: Arista Nashville

Brent Anderson (born in Pascagoula, Mississippi) is an American country music singer. He has charted on Hot Country Songs with the single "Amy's Song".

Anderson learned to play bass guitar at age 7, and later began playing acoustic guitar in a trio that included his father and father's cousin. By 17, Anderson had signed his first songwriting deal. He then signed with Sea Gayle, a division of Arista Nashville owned by Brad Paisley.

In late 2011, he released his debut single "Amy's Song". The song samples Pure Prairie League's 1973 hit "Amie" and includes backing vocals from Vince Gill and Pure Prairie League founder Craig Fuller. Taste of Country reviewer Billy Dukes gave the song four stars out of five, praising Anderson's "smoky" voice and the lyrics.

He wrote the 2014 song Lonely Tonight, which was sung by Blake Shelton and hit number 1 on the Billboard Country Airplay charts.

Although Anderson released no more material through Arista, he co-produced Chris Janson's album Buy Me a Boat and the 2017 single "Fix a Drink". These songs also feature Anderson on background vocals and acoustic guitar.

== Discography ==
=== Extended plays ===
Title	Details
8 Track	Release date: October 8, 2012; Label: Arista Nashville

=== Singles ===
Year	Single	Peak positions	Album
Year	Single	US Country	Album
2011	"Amy's Song"	47	8 Track
