= Fix a Drink =

Single by Chris Janson

from the album Everybody
- Released: May 22, 2017
- Genre: Country
- Length: 3:06
- Label: Warner Bros. Nashville
- Songwriter(s): Chris Janson; Chris DuBois; Ashley Gorley
- Producer(s): Chris DuBois; Brent Anderson

Chris Janson singles chronology
"Holdin' Her" (2016)	"Fix a Drink" (2017)	"Drunk Girl" (2017)

"Fix a Drink" is a song co-written and recorded by American country music singer Chris Janson. It was released in May 2017 as the first single from his album Everybody, which was released in September 2017. Janson co-wrote the song with Chris DuBois and Ashley Gorley.

== Music video ==
The music video was directed by Michael Monaco and premiered on CMT, GAC & CMT Music in July 2017. The Music video features appearances from Luke Bryan, Dustin Lynch, LOCASH, and Michael Ray.

The song has sold 152,000 copies in the United States as of November 2017.

== Charts ==
=== Weekly charts ===
Chart (2017)	Peak position
Canada Country (Billboard)	5
US Billboard Hot 100	67
US Country Airplay (Billboard)	2
US Hot Country Songs (Billboard)	10

=== Year-end charts ===
Chart (2017)	Position
Canada Country (Billboard)	26
US Country Airplay (Billboard)	41
US Hot Country Songs (Billboard)	45

== Certifications ==
Certifications for Fix a Drink
Region	Certification	Certified units/sales
United States (RIAA)	Platinum	1,000,000^{‡}
^{‡} Sales+streaming figures based on certification alone.
