= Chris Janson (EP) =

EP by Chris Janson
- Released: September 3, 2013
- Genre: Country
- Length: 17:27
- Label: Bigger Picture Music Group
- Producer: Keith Stegall

Chris Janson chronology
Chris Janson (2013)	Take It to the Bank (2014)

Singles from Chris Janson
- 1. "Better I Don't" Released: January 21, 2013; 2. "Cut Me Some Slack" Released: August 13, 2013

Chris Janson is the debut EP by American country music artist Chris Janson. It was released on September 3, 2013 via Bigger Picture Music Group.

== Critical reception ==
Matt Bjorke of Roughstock gave the album a positive review, saying that "Chris Janson EP is something any true fan of Country Music should want to buy to help support Real Country Music."

== Track listing ==
No.	Title	Writer(s)	Length
1.	"Cut Me Some Slack"	Chris Janson; Tiffany Goss; Kelly Roland	2:51
2.	"Better I Don't"	Janson; Pat Bunch; Roland	3:25
3.	"Redneck Revival"	Janson; Vicky McGehee; Keith Stegall	3:06
4.	"Corn"	Janson; Rhett Akins; Phil O'Donnell	3:54
Total length:			17:27

== Chart performance ==
Chart (2013)	Peak position
US Top Country Albums (Billboard)	47
US Heatseekers Albums (Billboard)	27
