= Good Vibes (Chris Janson song) =

2019 single and song by Chris Janson

Single by Chris Janson

from the album Real Friends
- Released: February 8, 2019
- Genre: Country
- Length: 2:46
- Label: Warner Nashville
- Songwriters: Chris Janson; Zach Crowell; Ashley Gorley
- Producers: Zach Crowell; Chris Janson

Chris Janson singles chronology
"Drunk Girl" (2017)	"Good Vibes" (2019)	"Done" (2019)

"Good Vibes" is a song by American country music singer Chris Janson. It is the lead single to his third studio album Real Friends. Janson co-wrote the song with Zach Crowell and Ashley Gorley, the former of whom also produced it.

== History ==
Janson said that the idea came from an impromptu meeting with fellow songwriters Zach Crowell and Ashley Gorley, both of whom have written for him previously. He said that the idea came about after telling the other two writers "good vibes only", which inspired the song's central theme of positivity.

The song also features a music video, starring Janson's wife and children.

== Commercial performance ==
"Good Vibes" reached No. 1 on Billboard' Country Airplay on chart dated October 26, 2019. This is Janson's first No. 1 on the chart. The song has sold 77,000 copies in the United States as of December 2019.

== Music video ==
The music video was directed by Michael Monaco and premiered on CMT, GAC and CMT Music in February 2019.

== Charts ==
=== Weekly charts ===
Chart (2019)	Peak position
Canada Country (Billboard)	1
US Billboard Hot 100	48
US Country Airplay (Billboard)	1
US Hot Country Songs (Billboard)	8

=== Year-end charts ===
Chart (2019)	Position
US Country Airplay (Billboard)	28
US Hot Country Songs (Billboard)	34

== Certifications ==
Certifications for Good Vibes
Region	Certification	Certified units/sales
United States (RIAA)	Platinum	1,000,000^{‡}
^{‡} Sales+streaming figures based on certification alone.
