= Chris DuBois =

American singer-songwriter

- Born: Charles Christopher DuBois; Stillwater, Oklahoma, U.S.
- Genre: Country
- Occupations: Songwriter; Music Publisher; Record Label Executive
- Years active: 1999-present

Charles Christopher DuBois is an American songwriter and music publisher based out of Nashville, Tennessee. DuBois began his music career as ASCAP Nashville Director of Membership in 1993. He left ASCAP in 1999 to form Sea Gayle Music with business partners Brad Paisley and Frank Rogers. Since that time, Sea Gayle has become one of the most successful independent publishing companies in all of music. In 2010 and 2011, Sea Gayle was named ASCAP Country Publisher of the Year. It was the first time since 1982 that an independent publishing company had won that award. In 2009, Sea Gayle Music launched Sea Gayle Records as an imprint of Sony Music Nashville.

As a songwriter, DuBois has had more than 30 Top 20 singles including 18 songs that have reached No. 1. DuBois has been the recipient of over 30 ASCAP awards and in 2004 was named ASCAP Country Songwriter of the Year. DuBois was also named NSAI Songwriter of the Year for 2010 and 2011.

DuBois began serving as Paisley's executive producer in 2005 on the album Time Well Wasted which won ACM and CMA awards for Album of the Year. DuBois has continued his role as executive producer for the Paisley albums 5th Gear, American Saturday Night, This is Country Music, Wheelhouse and Moonshine in the Trunk. Chris also co-produced the breakout WB debut album for Chris Janson and “Fix a Drink” from the Chris Janson album ‘’Everybody’’.

== Charting Singles ==
=== Number One Songs ===
Year	Song	Artist	Peak chart positions	
Year	Song	Artist	US Country	R&R / Aircheck
2000	"We Danced"	Brad Paisley	#1	#1
2003	"19 Somethin'"	Mark Wills	#1	#1
2005	"Mud On The Tires"	Brad Paisley	#1	#3
2006	"Your Man"	Josh Turner	#1	#1
2007	"Online"	Brad Paisley	#1	#1
2009	"Welcome to the Future"	Brad Paisley	#2	#1
2009	"Then"	Brad Paisley	#1	#1
2009	"It Won't Be Like This For Long"	Darius Rucker	#1	#1
2010	"Anything Like Me"	Brad Paisley	#1	#1
2010	"Water"	Brad Paisley	#1	#1
2011	"Remind Me"	Brad Paisley duet with Carrie Underwood	#1	#1
2011	"Old Alabama"	Brad Paisley	#1	#1
2013	"Beat This Summer"	Brad Paisley	#2	#1
2013	"Southern Comfort Zone"	Brad Paisley	#2	#1
2015	"Buy Me A Boat"	Chris Janson	#3	#1
2017	"Today"	Brad Paisley	#1	#1
2017	"Fix a Drink"	Chris Janson	#1	#1
2021	"You Should Probably Leave"	Chris Stapleton	#1	#1

=== Other Hits ===
Year	Song	Artist	Peak chart positions	
Year	Song	Artist	US Country	R&R / Aircheck
1999	"Who Needs Pictures"	Brad Paisley	#12	#10
2000	"Me Neither"	Brad Paisley	#18	#16
2002	"Wrapped Around"	Brad Paisley	#2	#2
2003	"I Wish You'd Stay"	Brad Paisley	#7	#8
2004	"Little Moments"	Brad Paisley	#2	#3
2004	"I Love You This Much"	Jimmy Wayne	#6	#6
2007	"The More I Drink"	Blake Shelton	#19	#19
2010	"This Ain't Nothin'"	Craig Morgan	#13	#13
2011	"This Is Country Music"	Brad Paisley	#2	#2
2012	"Camouflage"	Brad Paisley	#15	#14
2013	"Easy"	Sheryl Crow	#17	#17
2014	"The Mona Lisa"	Brad Paisley	#19	#18
