= Chris Janson =

American singer-songwriter

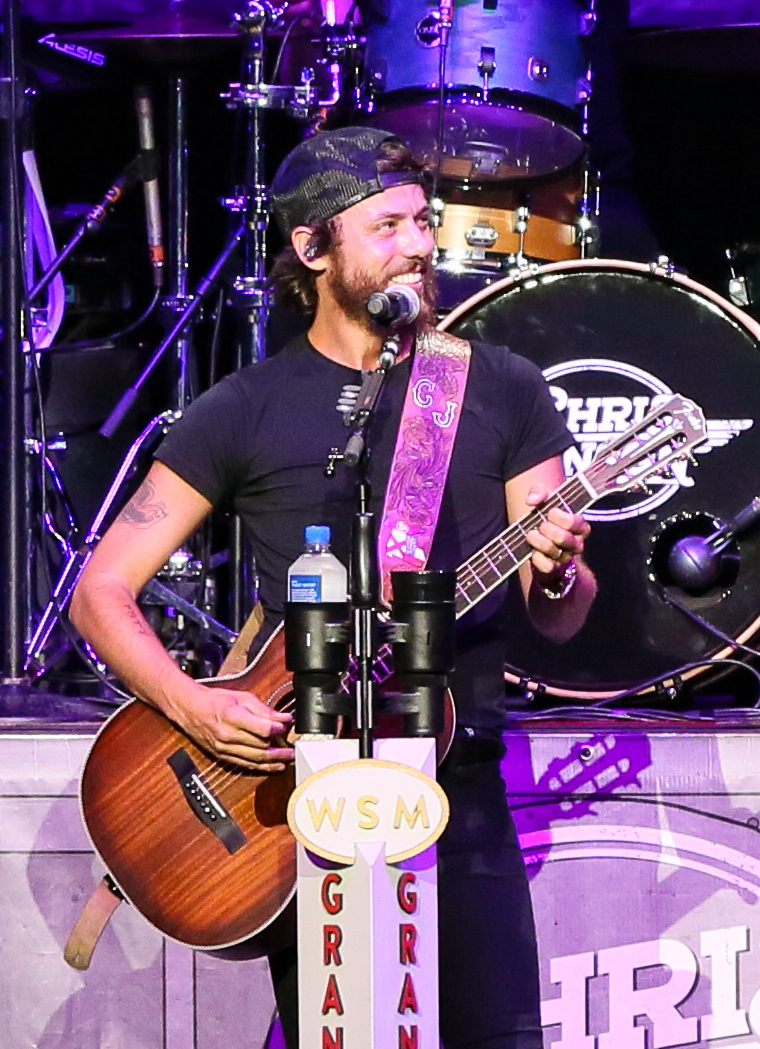
- Chris Janson in 2019

Background information
- Born: Christopher Pierre Janson; April 2, 1986 (age 40); Perryville, Missouri, U.S.
- Origin: Nashville, Tennessee, U.S.
- Genres: Country
- Occupations: Singer; songwriter
- Instruments: Vocals; harmonica; guitar; bass; piano; banjo; drums
- Years active: 2009–present
- Labels: BNA; Columbia Nashville; Bigger Picture; Warner Nashville; Big Machine
- Spouse: Kelly Lynn (m. 2010)

Christopher Pierre Janson (born April 2, 1986) is an American country music singer and songwriter. Janson has recorded three full-length albums, Buy Me a Boat, Everybody, and Real Friends, through Warner Records Nashville, along with one extended play each for Bigger Picture Music Group, Columbia Records, and Warner Nashville. He has charted multiple singles on the Billboard Hot Country Songs and Country Airplay charts, including "Good Vibes" and "Done", both of which went to number one on the latter. In addition to his material, Janson has performed on albums by Holly Williams and Lee Brice and has co-written singles for Tim McGraw, LoCash, Randy Houser and Hank Williams Jr.

== Musical career ==
Christopher Pierre Janson was born on April 2, 1986, in Perryville, Missouri. He moved to Nashville, Tennessee, after finishing high school.

In June 2009, Janson co-wrote and recorded two duets with Holly Williams on her album Here with Me: "I Hold On" and "A Love I Think Will Last." Janson signed to BNA Records in October 2009 and released his debut single, "'Til a Woman Comes Along," in April 2010. Matt Bjorke of Roughstock gave the single a five-star rating, with his review praising Janson's vocals as well as the arrangement. The song debuted at No. 56 on the Billboard Hot Country Songs charts dated for the week ending May 1, 2010.

After BNA was restructured, Janson left the label. He co-wrote Tim McGraw's 2012 single "Truck Yeah," played harmonica on the track "Beer" from Lee Brice's album Hard 2 Love, and wrote the title track to Justin Moore's 2013 album Off the Beaten Path.

In 2013, he signed to Bigger Picture Music Group and released "Better I Don't." Janson wrote the song with his wife, Kelly, and Pat Bunch, and Keith Stegall produced it. "Better I Don't" peaked at number 40 on Country Airplay in mid-2013. A second single, "Cut Me Some Slack," peaked at number 60 before Bigger Picture closed in 2014. That same year, Columbia Records released Take It to the Bank, which included "Til a Woman Comes Along" and other songs that he had recorded while on BNA.

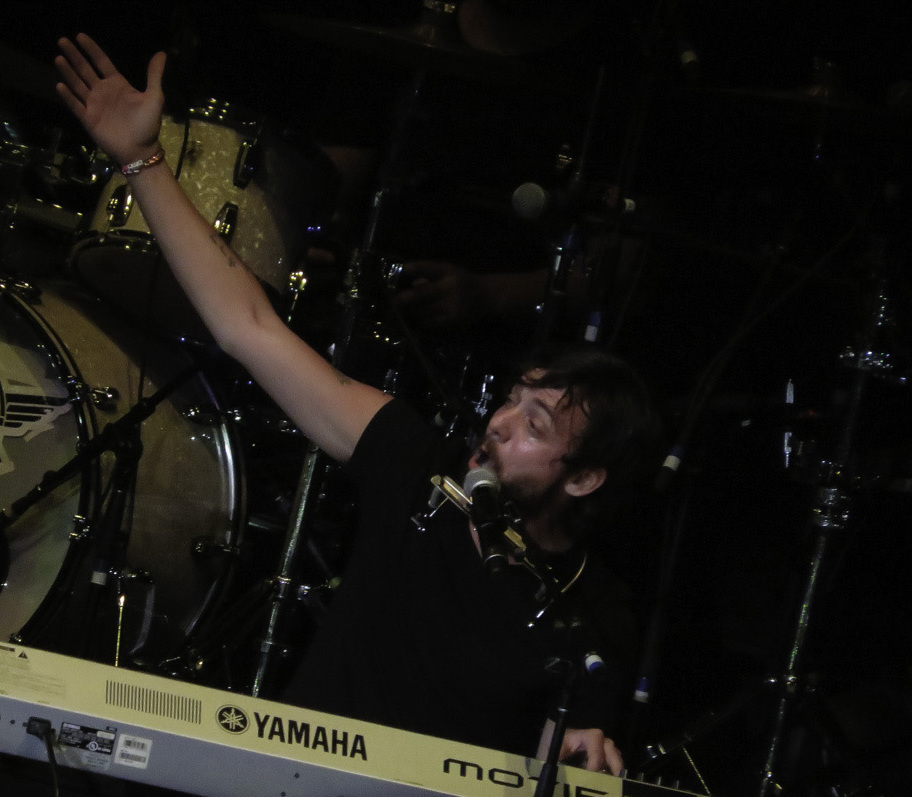
Chris Janson in 2017

Janson self-released the single "Buy Me a Boat" in early 2015. The song debuted at No. 33 on Hot Country Songs after it received airplay on the Bobby Bones Show. It was officially released as a single via Warner Records Nashville in May 2015, and became Janson's first top-5 hit by August. In September, Janson announced that his debut studio album (also titled Buy Me a Boat) would be released on October 30. "Buy Me a Boat" peaked at No. 3 on Country Airplay and No. 1 on Mediabase. The album also includes the singles "Power of Positive Drinkin'" and "Holdin' Her". Also, in 2015, Janson co-wrote LoCash's "I Love This Life." Also, in 2016, Janson co-wrote Randy Houser's "Song Number 7."

Janson performed on the third day of the 2016 Republican National Convention and night one of the 2024 Republican National Convention.

Janson's second album for Warner Nashville, Everybody, was released in September 2017. Its lead single is "Fix a Drink", which was followed in 2018 by "Drunk Girl". His next album was 2019's Real Friends, which accounted for the number-one singles "Good Vibes" and "Done". Jansons All In, was his fourth and final album with Warner before starting his own imprint "Harpeth 60 Records" with Nashville Harbor Records & Entertainment in 2022.

== Personal life ==
Janson has been married to Kelly Lynn since 2010. They have two children together; they also raise two children from Lynn's previous marriage.

== Discography ==
Studio albums

- Buy Me a Boat (2015)
- Everybody (2017)
- Real Friends (2019)
- All In (2022)
- The Outlaw Side of Me (2023)
- Wild Horses (2025)
