= List of Brad Paisley concert tours =

The following is a comprehensive list of American country music artist Brad Paisley's concert tours. Since 2005 he has headlined fifteen concerts tours, and co-headlined two.

== Muds and Suds Tour (2005) ==
Muds and Suds Tour
- Co-headlining tour by Brad Paisley & Sara Evans
- Location: United States
- Associated album: Mud on the Tires; Restless
- Start date: January 14, 2005
- End date: March 6, 2005
- Legs: 1
- No. of shows: 14

Brad Paisley & Sara Evans concert chronology
- Muds and Suds Tour (2005); Two Hats and a Redhead Tour (2005)

The Muds and Suds Tour was a co-headlining concert tour by Paisley and fellow American country music artist Sara Evans. It supported Paisley's third studio album Mud on the Tires (2003) and Evan's fourth studio album Restless (2003). The tour began on January 14, 2005, in Verona, New York and finished on March 6, 2005, in Rochester, Minnesota.

=== Opening acts ===
- Andy Griggs

=== Tour dates ===
| Date | City | Country | Venue |
|---|---|---|---|
| January 14, 2005 | Verona | United States | Turning Stone Resort Casino |
| January 15, 2005 | Wheeling | United States | WesBanco Arena |
| January 20, 2005 | Reading | United States | Sovereign Center |
| January 21, 2005 | Augusta | United States | Augusta Civic Center |
| January 22, 2005 | Lowell | United States | Tsongas Arena |
| February 12, 2005 | San Antonio | United States | SBC Center |
| February 18, 2005 | Fairfax | United States | Patriot Center |
| February 19, 2005 | Salisbury | United States | Wicomico Youth and Civic Center |
| February 20, 2005 | Uncasville | United States | Mohegan Sun Arena |
| February 24, 2005 | Normal | United States | Braden Auditorium |
| February 25, 2005 | Saginaw | United States | Dow Event Center |
| February 26, 2005 | Johnstown | United States | Cambria County War Memorial Arena |
| March 5, 2005 | West Lafayette | United States | Elliott Hall of Music |
| March 6, 2005 | Rochester | United States | Mayo Civic Center |

== Two Hats and a Redhead Tour (2005) ==
Two Hats and a Redhead Tour
- Co-headlining tour by Brad Paisley & Reba McEntire
- Location: United States
- Start date: April 15, 2005
- End date: June 18, 2005
- Legs: 1
- No. of shows: 24

Brad Paisley & Reba McEntire concert chronology
- Muds & Suds Tour (2005); Two Hats and a Redhead Tour (2005); Time Well Wasted Tour (2005–06)

The Two Hats and a Redhead Tour was a co-headlining concert tour by Paisley and American country music artist Reba McEntire with special guest Terri Clark. It began on April 15, 2005, in Virginia Beach, Virginia and ended on June 18, 2005, in San Bernardino, California.

=== Opening acts ===
- Terri Clark (Didn't open the first three shows)
- Joe Nichols (Opened for the first three shows, filling in for Clark)

=== Tour dates ===
| Date | City | Country | Venue |
|---|---|---|---|
| April 15, 2005 | Virginia Beach | United States | GTE Virginia Amphitheater |
| April 16, 2005 | Charlotte | United States | Verizon Wireless Amphitheatre |
| April 17, 2005 | Raleigh | United States | Alltell Pavilion at Walnut Creek |
| April 22, 2005 | Atlanta | United States | Chastain Park Amphitheater |
| April 23, 2005 | Tampa | United States | Ford Amphitheatre |
| April 24, 2005 | West Palm Beach | United States | Sound Advice Amphitheatre |
| May 5, 2005 | Hartford | United States | ctnow.com Meadows Music Theatre |
| May 6, 2005 | Mansfield | United States | Tweeter Center for the Performing Arts |
| May 7, 2005 | Holmdel | United States | PNC Bank Arts Center |
| May 13, 2005 | Noblesville | United States | Verizon Wireless Music Center |
| May 14, 2005 | Cincinnati | United States | Riverbend Music Center |
| May 15, 2005 | Cincinnati | United States | Riverbend Music Center |
| May 21, 2005 | Tinley Park | United States | Tweeter Center |
| May 22, 2005 | Clarkston | United States | DTE Energy Music Theatre |
| May 27, 2005 | Maryland Heights | United States | UMB Bank Pavilion |
| May 28, 2005 | Bonner Springs | United States | Verizon Wireless Amphitheatre |
| June 3, 2005 | Denver | United States | Pepsi Center |
| June 4, 2005 | West Valley City | United States | USANA Amphitheatre |
| June 10, 2005 | Auburn | United States | White River Amphitheatre |
| June 11, 2005 | Ridegfield | United States | The Amphitheater at Clark County |
| June 12, 2005 | Concord | United States | Chronicle Pavilion |
| June 16, 2005 | Tucson | United States | Anselmo Valencia Tori Amphitheater |
| June 17, 2005 | Las Vegas | United States | Mandalay Bay Events Center |
| June 18, 2005 | San Bernardino | United States | Hyundai Pavilion |

== Time Well Wasted Tour (2005–06) ==
Time Well Wasted Tour
- Tour by Brad Paisley
- Location: North America
- Associated album: Time Well Wasted
- Start date: December 9, 2005
- End date: December 8, 2006
- Legs: 4
- No. of shows: 72

Brad Paisley concert chronology
- Two Hats and a Redhead Tour (2005); Time Well Wasted Tour (2005–06); Bonfires & Amplifiers Tour (2007–08)

The Time Well Wasted Tour was Paisley's first headlining concert tour. It supported his fourth studio album, Time Well Wasted (2005). It began on December 9, 2005, in Lowell, Massachusetts, and finished on December 8, 2006, in Rosemont, Illinois.

=== Opening acts ===
Leg 1

- Terri Clark
- Johnny Reid

Leg 2

- Sara Evans
- Billy Currington
- Terri Clark

Leg 3

- Sara Evans
- Josh Turner
- Billy Currington
- Randy Rogers Band

Leg 4

- Carrie Underwood

Notes:
- Terri Clark was only a featuring act in Hamilton, Ottawa and London.
- Sara Evans was the only opening act in North Little Rock, AR.
- Josh Turner was the only opening act in Primm, NV.
- The Randy Rogers Band was an additional opening act in Dallas and Corpus Christie, TX.

=== Setlist ===
This setlist is a representation of the Columbia, Missouri, show.

1. "Celebrity"
2. "Wrapped Around"
3. "Me Neither"
4. "Mud on the Tires"
5. "Little Moments"
6. "I'll Take You Back"
7. "She's Back"
8. "Easy Money"
9. "When I Get Where I'm Going"
10. "Whiskey Lullaby"
11. "The World"
12. "Alcohol"
13. "I'm Gonna Miss Her (The Fishin' Song)"
14. "Folsom Prison Blues" (Johnny Cash cover)

=== Tour dates ===
| Date | City | Country | Venue |
Leg 1
| December 9, 2005 | Lowell | United States | Tosangs Arena |
| December 10, 2005 | State College | United States | Bryce Jordan Center |
| December 11, 2005 | Salem | United States | Salem Civic Center |
| January 12, 2006 | Sioux Falls | United States | Sioux Falls Arena |
| January 13, 2006 | Rapid City | United States | Rushmore Plaza Civic Center |
| January 14, 2006 | Casper | United States | Casper Events Center |
| January 15, 2006 | Bozeman | United States | Brick Breeden Fieldhouse |
| January 18, 2006 | Vancouver | Canada | Pacific Coliseum |
| January 19, 2006 | Kamloops | Canada | Interior Savings Centre |
| January 20, 2006 | Edmonton | Canada | Rexall Place |
| January 21, 2006 | Saskatoon | Canada | Credit Union Centre |
| January 22, 2006 | Winnipeg | Canada | MTS Centre |
Leg 2
| January 25, 2006 | Duluth | United States | Duluth Entertainment Convention Center |
| January 26, 2006 | Mankato | United States | Midwest Wireless Center |
| January 27, 2006 | Milwaukee | United States | Bradley Center |
| January 28, 2006 | Terre Haute | United States | Hulman Center |
| February 9, 2006 | Manchester | United States | Verizon Wireless Arena |
| February 10, 2006 | Uncasville | United States | Mohegan Sun Arena |
| February 11, 2006 | Morgantown | United States | WVU Coliseum |
| February 16, 2006 | Huntington | United States | Big Sandy Superstore Arena |
| February 17, 2006 | Fayetteville | United States | Crown Coliseum |
| February 18, 2006 | Columbus | United States | Columbus Civic Center |
| March 3, 2006 | Hidalgo | United States | Dodge Arena |
| March 12, 2006 | Hamilton | Canada | Copps Coliseum |
| March 13, 2006 | Ottawa | Canada | Corel Centre |
| March 14, 2006 | London | Canada | John Labbatt Centre |
| March 23, 2006 | Fort Wayne | United States | Allen County War Memorial Coliseum |
| March 24, 2006 | St. Louis | United States | Savvis Center |
| March 25, 2006 | Cedar Falls | United States | McLeod Center |
| March 26, 2006 | Peoria | United States | Peoria Civic Center |
| March 30, 2006 | Knoxville | United States | Thompson–Boling Arena |
| March 31, 2006 | Nashville | United States | Gaylord Entertainment Center |
| April 1, 2006 | Southaven | United States | DeSoto Civic Center |
Leg 3
| April 28, 2006 | North Little Rock | United States | Alltel Arena |
| April 29, 2006 | Dallas | United States | Smirnoff Music Centre |
| April 30, 2006 | Corpus Christi | United States | American Bank Center |
| May 4, 2006 | Albuquerque | United States | Sandia Casino Amphitheatre |
| May 5, 2006 | Glendale | United States | Glendale Arena |
| May 6, 2006 | Bakersfield | United States | Rabobank Arena |
| May 7, 2006 | Stockton | United States | Stockton Arena |
| May 11, 2006 | Tucson | United States | Tucson Convention Center |
| May 12, 2006 | Chula Vista | United States | Coors Amphitheatre |
| May 13, 2006 | San Bernardino | United States | Hyundai Pavilion |
| May 14, 2006 | Concord | United States | Chronicle Pavilion |
| May 20, 2006 | Primm | United States | Star of the Desert Arena |
Leg 4
| September 9, 2006 | South Park Township | United States | Allegheny County Fair |
| September 22, 2006 | Pelham | United States | Verizon Wireless Music Center |
| September 23, 2006 | Atlanta | United States | Philips Arena |
| September 24, 2006 | Pensacola | United States | Pensacola Civic Center |
| September 28, 2006 | Holmdel | United States | PNC Bank Arts Center |
| September 29, 2006 | Columbus | United States | Germain Amphitheater |
| September 30, 2006 | Cincinnati | United States | Riverbend Music Center |
| October 19, 2006 | Peoria | United States | Peoria Civic Center |
| October 20, 2006 | Fort Wayne | United States | Allen County War Memorial Coliseum |
| October 21, 2006 | Cape Girardeau | United States | Show Me Center |
| October 26, 2006 | Trenton | United States | Sovereign Bank Center |
| October 27, 2006 | Verona | United States | Turning Stone Resort Casino |
| October 28, 2006 | Baltimore | United States | 1st Mariner Arena |
| November 2, 2006 | Jackson | United States | Mississippi Coliseum |
| November 3, 2006 | Lafayette | United States | Cajundome |
| November 4, 2006 | The Woodlands | United States | Cynthia Woods Mitchell Pavilion |
| November 9, 2006 | Columbia, SC | United States | Colonial Center |
| November 10, 2006 | Greenville | United States | Bi-Lo Center |
| November 11, 2006 | Savannah | United States | Savannah Civic Center |
| November 16, 2006 | San Antonio | United States | AT&T Center |
| November 17, 2006 | Wichita Falls | United States | Kay Yeager Coliseum |
| November 18, 2006 | Oklahoma City | United States | Ford Center |
| November 30, 2006 | Colorado | United States | Colorado Springs World Arena |
| December 1, 2006 | Salt Lake City | United States | Delta Center |
| December 2, 2006 | Las Vegas | United States | Mandalay Bay Events Center |
| December 7, 2006 | Columbia, MO | United States | Mizzou Arena |
| December 8, 2006 | Rosemont | United States | Allstate Arena |

== Bonfires & Amplifiers Tour (2007–08) ==
Bonfires and Amplifiers Tour
- Tour by Brad Paisley
- Location: United States
- Associated album: Time Well Wasted; 5th Gear
- Start date: April 26, 2007
- End date: February 23, 2008
- Legs: 2
- No. of shows: 94

Brad Paisley concert chronology
- Time Well Wasted Tour (2005–06); Bonfires & Amplifiers Tour (2007–08); The Pasiley Party Tour (2008–09)

The Bonfires & Amplifiers Tour was Paisley's second headlining concert tour. The tour first supported his fourth album Time Well Wasted then later his fifth studio album, 5th Gear (2007). The tour was first announced in January 2007, and the 2008 leg in August 2007. It began on April 26, 2007, in Chattanooga, Tennessee and finished on February 23, 2008.

=== Opening acts ===
- Jack Ingram
- Kellie Pickler
- Taylor Swift
- Rodney Atkins (2008 Leg)
- Chuck Wicks (2008 Leg)

=== Setlist ===
This setlist is a representation of the Burgettstown, Pennsylvania show on September 15, 2007.

1. "Online"
2. "Wrapped Around"
3. "Mud on the Tires"
4. "Me Neither"
5. "Better Than This"
6. "She's Everything"
7. "Celebrity"
8. "The World"
9. "Throttleneck"
10. "Mr. Policeman"
11. "When I Get Where I'm Going"
12. "Little Moments"
13. "We Danced"
14. "Take Me Home, Country Roads" (John Denver cover)
15. "Whiskey Lullaby"
16. "Ticks"
17. "Alcohol"

Encore

18. "I'm Gonna Miss Her (The Fishin' Song)"
19. "Folsom Prison Blues" (Johnny Cash cover)

=== Tour dates ===
| Date | City | Country | Venue |
Leg 1
| April 26, 2007 | Chattanooga | United States | McKenzie Arena |
| April 27, 2007 | Statesboro | United States | Paulson Stadium |
| April 28, 2007 | Columbus | United States | Columbus Civic Center |
| May 3, 2007 | Evansville | United States | Roberts Municipal Stadium |
| May 4, 2007 | Moline | United States | The MARK of the Quad Cities |
| May 6, 2007 | Champaign | United States | Assembly Hall |
| May 10, 2007 | Maryland Heights | United States | UMB Bank Pavilion |
| May 11, 2007 | Bonner Springs | United States | Verizon Wireless Amphitheater |
| May 12, 2007 | Dallas | United States | Smirnoff Music Center |
| May 17, 2007 | Bakersfield | United States | Rabobank Arena |
| May 18, 2007 | Mountain View | United States | Shoreline Amphitheatre |
| May 19, 2007 | Wheatland | United States | Sleep Train Amphitheater |
| May 20, 2007 | Reno | United States | Reno Event Center |
| May 22, 2007 | Vancouver | Canada | GM Place |
| May 24, 2007 | Spokane | United States | Spokane Arena |
| May 25, 2007 | Ridgefield | United States | The Amphitheater at Clark County |
| May 26, 2007 | Auburn | United States | White River Amphitheatre |
| June 7, 2007 | Noblesville | United States | Verizon Wireless Music Center |
| June 8, 2007 | Cuyahoga Falls | United States | Blossom Music Center |
| June 9, 2007 | Mansfield | United States | Tweeter Center |
| June 10, 2007 | Darien | United States | Darien Lake Performing Arts Center |
| June 22, 2007 (Note: The show on June 22, 2007, was a part of Country Jam USA.) | Grand Junction | United States | Country Jam USA |
| June 22, 2007 (Note: The show on June 23, 2007, was a part of Greeley Independence Stampede.) | Greeley | United States | Greeley Independence Stampede |
| June 24, 2007 | Albuquerque | United States | ABQ Journal Pavilion |
| June 28, 2007 | Lemoore | United States | Tachi Palace |
| June 29, 2007 | Chula Vista | United States | Coors Amphitheatre |
| June 30, 2007 | San Bernardino | United States | Hyundai Pavilion |
| July 1, 2007 | Phoenix | United States | Cricket Pavilion |
| July 19, 2007 (Note: The show on July 19, 2007, was a part of Jamboree in the Hills.) | Morristown | United States | Jamboree in the Hills |
| July 20, 2007 | Raleigh | United States | Walnut Creek Amphitheatre |
| July 21, 2007 | Charlotte | United States | Verizon Wireless Amphitheatre |
| July 25, 2007 (Note: The show on July 25, 2007, was a part of the Delaware State Fair.) | Harrington | United States | Delaware State Fair |
| July 27, 2007 | Bethel | United States | Bethel Woods Center for the Arts |
| July 28, 2007 | Hershey | United States | Giant Center |
| August 3, 2007 | Jacksonville | United States | Jacksonville Veterans Memorial Arena |
| August 4, 2007 | Atlanta | United States | HiFi Buys Amphitheatre |
| August 5, 2007 | Clarkston | United States | DTE Energy Music Theatre |
| August 9, 2007 | Biloxi | United States | Mississippi Coast Coliseum |
| August 10, 2007 | Pelham | United States | Verizon Wireless Music Center |
| August 11, 2007 | Nashville | United States | Starwood Amphitheatre |
| August 23, 2007 (Note: The show on August 23, 2007, was a part of the Minnesota State Fair.) | Falcon Heights | United States | Minnesota State Fair |
| August 24, 2007 | Cedar Rapids | United States | U.S. Cellular Center |
| August 25, 2007 | Milwaukee | United States | Marcus Amphitheater |
| August 26, 2007 | Tinley Park | United States | First Midwest Bank Amphitheatre |
| August 30, 2007 (Note: The show on August 30, 2007, was a part of the Great Allentown Fair.) | Allentown | United States | Great Allentown Fair |
| August 31, 2007 | Essex Junction | United States | Champlain Valley Expo |
| September 1, 2007 (Note: The show on September 1, 2007, was a part of the New York State Fair.) | Syracuse | United States | New York State Fair |
| September 6, 2007 | London | Canada | John Labott Centre |
| September 7, 2007 | Hamilton | Canada | Copps Coliseum |
| September 8, 2007 | Ottawa | Canada | Scotiabank Place |
| September 10, 2007 | Halifax | Canada | Halifax Metro Centre |
| September 11, 2007 | Saint John | Canada | Harbour Station |
| September 12, 2007 | Portland | United States | Cumberland County Civic Center |
| September 14, 2007 | Cuyahoga Falls | United States | Blossom Music Center |
| September 15, 2007 | Burgettstown | United States | Post-Gazette Pavilion |
| September 20, 2007 | Atlanta | United States | Hi-Fi Buys Amphitheatre |
| September 21, 2007 | Tampa | United States | Ford Amphitheatre |
| September 22, 2007 | West Palm Beach | United States | Sound Advice Amphitheatre |
| September 23, 2007 | Estero | United States | Germain Arena |
| October 4, 2007 | Auburn Hills | United States | The Palace of Auburn Hills |
| October 5, 2007 | Cincinnati | United States | Riverbend Music Center |
| October 6, 2007 | Bristow | United States | Nissan Pavilion |
| October 7, 2007 | Virginia Beach | United States | Verizon Wireless Amphitheatre |
| October 11, 2007 | Grand Forks | United States | Ralph Engelstad Arena |
| October 12, 2007 | Winnipeg | Canada | MTS Centre |
| October 13, 2007 | Saskatoon | Canada | Credit Union Centre |
| October 17, 2007 | Edmonton | Canada | Rexall Place |
| October 18, 2007 | Lethbridge | Canada | ENMAX Centre |
| October 19, 2007 | Calgary | Canada | Pengrowth Saddledome |
| October 21, 2007 | Vancouver | Canada | GM Place |
| November 1, 2007 | Bossier City | United States | CenturyTel Center |
| November 2, 2007 | The Woodlands | United States | Cynthia Woods Mitchell Pavilion |
| November 3, 2007 | Selma | United States | Verizon Wireless Amphitheater |
| November 8, 2007 | Fayetteville | United States | Crown Coliseum |
| November 9, 2007 | Greensboro | United States | Greensboro Coliseum |
| November 10, 2007 | Roanoke | United States | Roanoke Civic Center |
| November 15, 2007 | Omaha | United States | Qwest Center |
| November 16, 2007 | Rockford | United States | Rockford MetroCentre |
| November 17, 2007 | Grand Rapids | United States | Van Andel Arena |
| November 29, 2007 | Lexington | United States | Rupp Arena |
Leg 2
| January 16, 2008 | Denver | United States | Pepsi Center |
| January 17, 2008 | Casper | United States | Casper Events Center |
| January 18, 2008 | Billings | United States | Rimrock Auto Arena at MetraPark |
| January 19, 2008 | Missoula | United States | Adams Fieldhouse |
| January 23, 2008 | Nampa | United States | Idaho Center |
| January 24, 2008 | Salt Lake City | United States | EnergySolutions Arena |
| January 26, 2008 | Las Vegas | United States | Mandalay Bay Events Center |
| January 31, 2008 | Memphis | United States | FedExForum |
| February 1, 2008 | Knoxville | United States | Thompson-Boling Arena |
| February 2, 2008 | Macon | United States | Macon CentrePlex |
| February 15, 2008 | Nashville | United States | Somet Center |
| February 16, 2008 | Greenville | United States | Bon Secours Wellness Arena |
| February 21, 2008 | Green Bay | United States | Resch Center |
| February 22, 2008 | Peoria | United States | Peoria Civic Center |
| February 23, 2008 | Des Moines | United States | Wells Fargo Arena |

== Paisley Party Tour (2008–09) ==
Paisley Party Tour
- Tour by Brad Paisley
- Location: North America
- Associated album: 5th Gear; Play: The Guitar Album
- Start date: June 11, 2008
- End date: March 1, 2009
- Legs: 2
- No. of shows: 64

Brad Paisley concert chronology
- Bonfires & Amplifiers Tour (2007–08); Paisley Party Tour (2008–09); American Saturday Night Tour (2009–10)

The Paisley Party Tour was Paisley's third headlining concert tour. It began on June 11, 2008, in Albuquerque, New Mexico and finished on March 1, 200, in Yakima, Washington. It was in support of his albums 5th Gear and Play: The Guitar Album.

=== Opening acts ===
Leg 1

- Jewel
- Chuck Wicks
- Julianne Hough

Leg 2

- Darius Rucker (January)
- Crystal Shawanda (February, March)

=== Tour dates ===
| Date | City | Country | Venue |
Leg 1
| June 11, 2008 | Albuerquque | United States | Journal Pavilion |
| June 12, 2008 | Phoenix | United States | Crickett Pavilion |
| June 13, 2008 | Chula Vista | United States | Coors Amphitheatere |
| June 14, 2008 | Irvine | United States | Verizon Wirelss Amphitheatere |
| June 19, 2008 | Fresno | United States | Save Mart Center |
| June 20, 2008 | Mountain View | United States | Shoreline Amphitheatre |
| June 21, 2008 | Wheatland | United States | Sleep Train Amphitheatere |
| June 26, 2008 | Noblesville | United States | Verizon Wireless Music Center |
| June 27, 2008 | Dariem | United States | Darien Lake Performing Arts Center |
| June 28, 2008 | Holmdel | United States | PNC Bank Arts Center |
| July 11, 2008 | Cincinnati | United States | Riverbend Music Center |
| July 12, 2008 | Bristow | United States | Nissan Pavilion |
| July 17, 2008 (Note: The show on July 17, 2008, was a part of Jamboree in the Hills.) | St. Clarisville | United States | Jamboree in the Hills |
| July 18, 2008 | Charlotte | United States | Verizon Wireless Amphitheatre |
| July 19, 2008 | Raleigh | United States | Time Warner Cable Music Pavilion |
| July 24, 2008 | Hartford | United States | New England Dodge Music Center |
| July 25, 2008 | Scranton | United States | Toyota Pavilion |
| July 26, 2008 | Hershey | United States | Giant Center |
| August 1, 2008 | Kansas City | United States | Sprint Center |
| August 2, 2008 | Dallas | United States | Superpages.com Center |
| August 9, 2008 (Note: The show on August 9, 2008, was a part of the WE Fest.) | Detroit Lakes | United States | WE Fest |
| August 15, 2008 | Maryland Heights | United States | Hollywood Casino Amphitheatre |
| August 16, 2008 (Note: The show on August 16, 2008, was a part of the Kentucky State Fair.) | Louisville | United States | Kentucky Exposition Center |
| August 17, 2008 | Burgettstown | United States | Post-Gazette Pavilion |
| August 22, 2008 (Note: The show on August 22, 2008, was a part of the Minnesota State Fair.) | Falcon Heights | United States | Minnesota State Fair |
| August 23, 2008 | Tinley Park | United States | Hollywood Casino Amphitheatre |
| August 29, 2008 | Cuyahoga Falls | United States | Blossom Music Center |
| August 30, 2008 | Camden | United States | Susquehanna Bank Center |
| August 31, 2008 | Virginia Beach | United States | Verizon Wireless Amphitheater |
| September 18, 2008 | Atlanta | United States | Lakewood Amphitheatre |
| September 19, 2008 | Tampa | United States | Ford Amphitheatre |
| September 20, 2008 | West Palm Beach | United States | Cruzan Amphitheatre |
| September 25, 2008 | Providence | United States | Dunkin' Donuts Center |
| September 26, 2008 | Uncasville | United States | Mohegan Sun Arena |
| September 27, 2008 | Providence | United States | Dunkin' Donuts Center |
| October 2, 2008 | Gainesville | United States | Stephen C. O'Connell Center |
| October 3, 2008 | Pelham | United States | Verizon Wireless Music Center |
| October 4, 2008 | Biloxi | United States | Mississippi Coast Coliseum |
| October 17, 2008 | The Woodlands | United States | Cynthia Woods Mitchell Pavilion |
| October 18, 2008 | Selma | United States | Verizon Wireless Amphitheater |
Leg 2
| January 15, 2009 | Tupelo | United States | BancorpSouth Arena |
| January 16, 2009 | North Little Rock | United States | Alltel Arena |
| January 17, 2009 | New Orleans | United States | New Orleans Arena |
| January 18, 2009 | Pensacola | United States | Pensacola Civic Center |
| January 22, 2009 | Austin | United States | Frank Erwin Center |
| January 23, 2009 | Bossier City | United States | CenturyTel Center |
| January 24, 2009 | Tulsa | United States | BOK Center |
| January 25, 2009 | Lubbock | United States | United Spirit Arena |
| January 29, 2009 | Fairborn | United States | Nutter Center |
| January 30, 2009 | Moline | United States | iWireless Center |
| January 31, 2009 | Omaha | United States | Qwest Center |
| February 12, 2009 | London | Canada | John Labatt Centre |
| February 13, 2009 | Hamilton | Canada | Copps Coliseum |
| February 14, 2009 | Ottawa | Canada | Scotiabank Place |
| February 17, 2009 | Winnipeg | Canada | MTS Centre |
| February 18, 2009 | Regina | Canada | Brandt Centre |
| February 19, 2009 | Saskatoon | Canada | Credit Union Centre |
| February 20, 2009 | Edmonton | Canada | Rexall Place |
| February 21, 2009 | Calgary | Canada | Pengrowth Saddledome |
| February 22, 2009 | Vancouver | Canada | Rogers Place |
| February 26, 2009 | Spokane | United States | Spokane Arena |
| February 27, 2009 | Portland | United States | Rose Garden |
| February 28, 2009 | Tacoma | United States | Tacoma Dome |
| March 1, 2009 | Yakima | United States | Yakima SunDome |

== American Saturday Night Tour (2009–10) ==
American Saturday Night Tour
- Tour by Brad Paisley
- Location: North America
- Associated album: American Saturday Night
- Start date: June 5, 2009
- End date: March 6, 2010
- Legs: 2
- No. of shows: 41

Brad Paisley concert chronology
- Paisley Party Tour (2008–09); American Saturday Night Tour (2009–10); The H2O Tour (2010)

The American Saturday Night Tour was Paisley's fourth headlining concert tour. It was in support of his album American Saturday Night. It began on June 5, 2009, in Charlotte, North Carolina and finished on March 6, 2010, in North Charleston, South Carolina.

=== Background ===
The second leg was announced in January 2010, and began on January 7, 2010, in San Antonio, Texas.

=== Opening acts ===
Leg 1

- Dierks Bentley
- Jimmy Wayne

Leg 2

- Miranda Lambert
- Justin Moore

=== Setlist ===
1. "Start a Band"
2. "American Saturday Night"
3. "Wrapped Around"
4. "Celebrity"
5. "Mud on the Tires"
6. "Waitin' on a Woman"
7. "Water"
8. "I'm Still a Guy"
9. "Catch All the Fish"
10. "I'm Gonna Miss Her (The Fishin' Song)"
11. "She's Everything"
12. "The World"
13. "Huckleberry Jam/Cliffs of Rock City"
14. "Letter to Me"
15. "When I Get Where I'm Going"
16. "Online"
17. "Ticks"
18. "When I Get Where I'm Going"
19. "Then"
20. "Ticks"
21. "Welcome to the Future"

Encore

24. "Alcohol"
25. "The Boys of Summer" (Don Henley cover)

=== Tour dates ===
| Date | City | Country | Venue |
Leg 1
| June 5, 2009 | Charlotte | United States | Verizon Wireless Amphitheatre |
| June 6, 2009 | Raleigh | United States | Time Warner Cable Pavilion |
| June 12, 2009 | Mansfield | United States | Comcast Center |
| June 13, 2009 | Hartford | United States | New England Dodge Music Center |
| June 18, 2009 | Maryland Heights | United States | Verizon Wireless Amphitheatre |
| June 19, 2009 | Cincinnati | United States | Riverbend Music Center |
| June 26, 2009 (Note: The show on June 26, 2009, was a part of Country USA.) | Oshkosh | United States | Country USA |
| June 27, 2009 (Note: The show on June 27, 2009, was a part of the Chippewa Valley Country Fest.) | Cadott | United States | Chippewa Valley Country Fest |
| July 10, 2009 | Clarkston | United States | DTE Energy Music Theatre |
| July 11, 2009 (Note: The show on July 11, 2009, was a part of the Country Concert at Hickory Hills Lake.) | Fort Loramie | United States | Country Concert at Hickory Lake Hills |
| July 10, 2009 | Clarkston | United States | DTE Energy Music Theatre |
| July 17, 2009 | Toronto | Canada | Molson Amphitheatre |
| July 18, 2009 (Note: The show on July 18, 2009, was a part of Sarnia Bayfest.) | Sarnia | Canada | Sarnia Bayfest |
| July 24, 2009 | Virginia Beach | United States | Verizon Wireless Amphitheater |
| July 25, 2009 | Bristow | United States | Nissan Pavilion |
| July 26, 2009 (Note: The show on July 26, 2009, was a part of the Delaware State Fair.) | Harrington | United States | Delaware State Fair |
| July 25, 2009 | Bristow | United States | Nissan Pavilion |
| August 7, 2009 | Tinley Park | United States | First Midwest Bank Amphitheatre |
| August 8, 2009 | Noblesville | United States | Verizon Wireless Music Center |
| August 14, 2009 | Darien | United States | Darien Lake Performing Arts Center |
| August 15, 2009 | Camden | United States | Susquehanna Bank Center |
| October 2, 2009 | Chula Vista | United States | Cricket Wireless Ampitheatre |
Leg 2
| January 7, 2010 | San Antonio | United States | AT&T Center |
| January 8, 2010 | Oklahoma City | United States | Ford Center |
| January 9, 2010 | Wichita | United States | Intrust Bank Arena |
| January 14, 2010 | Sioux City | United States | Tyson Events Center |
| January 15, 2010 | Des Moines | United States | Wells Fargo Arena |
| January 16, 2010 | Saint Paul | United States | Xcel Energy Center |
| January 21, 2010 | Lexington | United States | Rupp Arena |
| January 22, 2010 | Columbus | United States | Nationwide Arena |
| January 23, 2010 | Grand Rapids | United States | Van Andel Arena |
| January 24, 2010 | Bloomington | United States | U.S. Cellular Coliseum |
| February 4, 2010 | Tupelo | United States | BancorpSouth Arena |
| February 5, 2010 | Birmingham | United States | BJCC Arena |
| February 6, 2010 | Biloxi | United States | Mississippi Coast Coliseum |
| February 18, 2010 | Fresno | United States | Save Mart Center |
| February 19, 2010 | Los Angeles | United States | Staples Center |
| February 20, 2010 | Las Vegas | United States | Mandalay Bay Events Center |
| February 21, 2010 | Reno | United States | Reno Events Center |
| March 4, 2010 | Greenville | United States | Bi-Lo Center |
| March 5, 2010 | Knoxville | United States | Thompson-Boling Arena |
| March 6, 2010 | North Charleston | United States | North Charleston Coliseum |

== The H2O Tour / H2O Frozen Oven Tour (2010–11) ==
The H2O Tour Tour: The H2O Frozen Oven Tour
- Tour by Brad Paisley
- Location: North America; Europe
- Associated album: American Saturday Night
- Start date: May 21, 2010
- End date: February 26, 2011
- Legs: 4
- No. of shows: 55

Brad Paisley concert chronology
- American Saturday Night Tour (2009–10); The H2O Tour/H20 Frozen Over Tour (2010–11); The H2O II Tour (2011)

The H2O Tour was Paisley's fifth headlining concert tour and was in support of American Saturday Night (2009). The tour began on May 21, 2010, in Virginia Beach, Virginia and finished on February 26, 2011, in Nashville, Tennessee. The winter 2011 leg of the tour was rebranded as The H2O Frozen Over Tour.

=== Background ===
The tour was first announced in March 2010. At each tour stop there were donations made to the Hope Through Healing campaign. Also at every tour stop there was a "World Water Plaza". The plaza consisted of an additional performance stage, water themed activities, the Hope Through Healing booth, a fishing simulator, a Corvette simulator where fans could virtually race Paisley. Winners of the race had the chance to meet Paisley. The first leg was presented by Chevrolet. The 2011 leg of the tour was announced in October 2010.

=== Opening acts ===
2010 shows

- Darius Rucker
- Justin Moore

Water World Plaza

- Easton Corbin
- Steel Magnolia
- Josh Thompson

2011 shows

- Darius Rucker
- Jerrod Niemann

=== Setlist ===
This setlist is a representation of the Charlotte, NC show on August 27, 2010.

1. " Water"
2. "Online"
3. "American Saturday Night"
4. "Wrapped Around"
5. "You Do the Math"
6. "Celebrity"
7. "Waitin' on a Woman"
8. "Catch All the Fish"
9. "Letter to Me"
10. "Mud on the Tires"
11. "I'm Still a Guy"
12. "Time Warp"
13. "Whiskey Lullaby"
14. "The World"
15. "I'm Gonna Miss Her (The Fishin' Song)"
16. "Welcome to the Future"
17. "Then"

Encore

19. "Ticks"
20. "Alcohol"

=== Tour dates ===
| Date | City | Country | Venue |
North America Leg 1
| May 21, 2010 | Virginia Beach | United States | Virginia Beach Amphitheater |
| May 22, 2010 | Bristow | United States | Jiffy Lube Live |
| May 28, 2010 | Kansas City | United States | Sprint Center |
| May 29, 2010 | Maryland Heights | United States | Verizon Wireless Amphitheatere |
| June 4, 2010 | Toledo | United States | Lucas County Arena |
| June 5, 2010 | Noblesville | United States | Verizon Wireless Amphitheatre |
| June 6, 2010 | Cincinnati | United States | Riverbend Music Center |
| June 11, 2010 | Clarkston | United States | DTE Energy Music Theatre |
| June 12, 2010 | Burgettstown | United States | First Niagara Pavilion |
| June 18, 2010 | Darien Lake | United States | Darien Lake Performing Arts Center |
| June 19, 2010 | Camden | United States | Susquehanna Bank Pavilion |
Europe
| June 23, 2010 | London | England | Shepherd's Bush Empire |
| June 24, 2010 | London | England | Shepherd's Bush Empire |
| June 25, 2010 | Oslo | Norway | Notodden Music Festival |
North America Leg 2
| July 16, 2010 | Tinley Park | United States | First Midwest Bank Amphitheater |
| July 17, 2010 | Moline | United States | iWireless Center |
| July 22, 2010 | Toronto | Canada | Molson Amphitheater |
| July 23, 2010 | Cuyahoga Falls | United States | Blossom Music Center |
| July 24, 2010 | Saratoga Falls | United States | Saratoga Performing Arts Center |
| July 25: 2010 | Harrington | United States | Delaware State Fair |
| August 5, 2010 | Hidalgo | United States | State Farm Arena |
| August 6, 2010 | The Woodlands | United States | Cynthia Woods Mitchell Pavilion |
| August 7, 2010 | Dallas | United States | Sueprpages.com Center |
| August 12, 2010 | Daytona Beach | United States | Ocean Center |
| August 13, 2010 | Tampa | United States | Ford Amphitheatre |
| August 14, 2010 | West Palm Beach | United States | Cruzan Amphitheatre |
| August 21, 2010 | Foxboro | United States | Gillette Stadium |
| August 27, 2010 | Charlotte | United States | Verizon Wireless Amphitheatre |
| August 28, 2010 | Raleigh | United States | Time Warner Cable Pavilion |
| September 9, 2010 | Spokane | United States | Spokane Arena |
| September 10, 2010 | Ridgefield | United States | Sleep Country Amphitheater |
| September 11, 2010 | George | United States | The Gorge Amphitheatre |
| September 15, 2010 | Mountain View | United States | Shoreline Amphitheatre |
| September 17, 2010 | Chula Vista | United States | Cricket Wireless Amphitheatre |
| September 18, 2010 | Phoenix | United States | Cricket Wireless Pavilion |
| September 19, 2010 | Albuquerque | United States | The Pavilion |
| September 23, 2010 | Boise | United States | Taco Bell Arena |
| September 24, 2010 | West Valley City | United States | USANA Amphitheatre |
| September 25, 2010 | Greenwood Village | United States | Fiddler's Green Amphitheatre |
North America Leg 3 / The H2O Frozen Over Tour
| January 20, 2011 | Green Bay | United States | Resch Center |
| July 21, 2011 | Fort Wayne | United States | Allen County War Memorial Coliseum |
| July 22, 2011 | Evansville | United States | Ford Center |
| January 27, 2011 | London | Canada | John Labatt Centre |
| January 28, 2011 | Hamilton | Canada | Copps Coliseum |
| January 29, 2011 | Montreal | Canada | Bell Centre |
| January 30, 2011 | Ottawa | Canada | Scotiabank Place |
| February 10, 2011 | Atlanta | United States | Philips Arena |
| February 11, 2011 | Birmingham | United States | BJCC Arena |
| February 12, 2011 | Lafayette | United States | Cajundome |
| February 17, 2011 | Hershey | United States | Giant Center |
| February 18, 2011 | Roanoke | United States | Roanoke Civic Center |
| February 19, 2011 | Louisville | United States | KFC Yum! Center |
| February 24, 2011 | Orlando | United States | Amway Center |
| February 25, 2011 | Columbus | United States | Columbus Civic Center |
| February 26, 2011 | Nashville | United States | Bridgestone Arena |

== H2O II: Wetter and Wilder Tour (2011) ==
H2O II: Wetter and Wilder Tour
- Tour by Brad Paisley
- Location: North America; Europe
- Associated album: This Is Country Music
- Start date: May 28, 2011
- End date: September 25, 2011
- Legs: 3
- No. of shows: 33

Brad Paisley concert chronology
- The H2O Tour/H20 Frozen Over Tour (2010–11); H2O II: Wetter and Wilder Tour (2011); Virtual Reality Tour (2012)

The H2O Tour was Paisley's sixth headlining concert tour and was in support of his ninth studio album, This Is Country Music (2011). The tour began on May 28, 2011, in Pittsburgh, Pennsylvania and finished on September 25, 2011, in Raleigh, North Carolina.

=== Opening acts ===
- Darius Rucker
- Jerrod Niemann
- Blake Shelton

Water World Plaza

- Edens Edge
- Sunny Sweeney
- Brent Anderson

=== Tour dates ===
| Date | City | Country | Venue | Opening acts |
North America Leg 1
| May 28, 2011 | Pittsburgh | United States | Heinz Field | Darius Rucker; Blake Shelton; Jerrod Niemann |
| June 3, 2011 | Virginia Beach | United States | Farm Bureau Live | —N/a |
| June 4, 2011 | Hartford | United States | Comcast Theatre | —N/a |
| June 11, 2011 | Cleveland | United States | Progressive Field | —N/a |
| June 16, 2011 | Cincinnati | United States | Riverbend Music Center | —N/a |
| June 17, 2011 | Maryland Heights | United States | Verizon Wireless Amphitheater | —N/a |
| June 18, 2011 | Noblesville | United States | Klipsch Music Center | —N/a |
| June 24, 2011 | North Platte | United States | Nebraskland Days | Blake Shelton; Jerrod Niemann |
| June 25, 2011 | Manhattan | United States | Country Stampede Music Festival | Blake Shelton; Jerrod Niemann |
| July 2, 2011 | Provo | United States | LaVell Edwards Stadium | —N/a |
| July 9, 2011 | Cavendish | Canada | Cavendish Beach Music Festival | Blake Shelton; Jerrod Niemann |
| July 15, 2011 | Holmdel | United States | PNC Bank Arts Center | —N/a |
| July 16, 2011 | Mansfield | United States | Comcast Center | —N/a |
| July 17, 2011 | Scarborough | United States | Scarborough Downs | —N/a |
| July 22, 2011 | Scranton | United States | Toyota Pavilion | —N/a |
| July 23, 2011 | Darien | United States | Darien Lake Performing Arts Center | —N/a |
| July 30, 2011 | Frisco | United States | Pizza Hut Park | —N/a |
| August 4, 2011 | Detroit Lakes | United States | WE Fest | Blake Shelton; Jerrod Niemann |
| August 6, 2011 | Tinley Park | United States | First Midwest Bank Amphitheatre | —N/a |
| August 7, 2011 | Columbus | United States | Columbus Crew Stadium | —N/a |
Europe
| August 17, 2011 | London | England | The O_{2} Arena | —N/a |
| August 19, 2011 | Dublin | Ireland | Olympia Theatre | —N/a |
| August 20, 2011 | Chelmsford | England | V Festival | —N/a |
| August 21, 2011 | Staffordshire | England | V Festival | —N/a |
| August 24, 2011 | Stockholm | Sweden | Cirkus | —N/a |
| August 26, 2011 | Oslo | Norway | Oslo Spektrum | —N/a |
| August 27, 2011 | Gothenburg | Sweden | Lisebergshallen | —N/a |
| August 28, 2011 | Copenhagen | Denmark | Forum Copenhagen | —N/a |
North America Leg 2
| September 9, 2011 | Tampa | United States | 1-800-ASK-GARY Amphitheatre | —N/a |
| September 10, 2011 | West Palm Beach | United States | Cruzan Amphitheatre | —N/a |
| September 23, 2011 | Camden | United States | Susquehanna Bank Center | —N/a |
| September 24, 2011 | Bristow | United States | Jiffy Lube Live | —N/a |
| September 25, 2011 | Raleigh | United States | Time Warner Cable Music Pavillon | —N/a |

== Virtual Reality World Tour (2012) ==
The Virtual Reality World Tour was Paisley's seventh headlining concert tour. It was in support of his eighth studio album, This Is Country Music (2011). The tour began on January 12, 2012, in Grand Rapids, Michigan and ended on November 13, 2012, in Dublin, Ireland. It ranked sixteen for Billboard's Top 25 Tours of 2012.

== Beat This Summer Tour (2013) ==
The Beat This Summer Tour was Paisley's eighth headlining tour. It was in support of his ninth studio album, Wheelhouse and was presented by Cracker Barrel. The tour began on May 9, 2013, in Maryland Heights, Missouri and finished on March 16, 2014, in London, England.

== Country Nation World Tour (2014–15) ==
The Country Nation World Tour was Paisley's ninth headlining concert tour and was in support of his ninth studio album, Wheelhouse (2013), and tenth studio album, Moonshine in the Trunk (2014). The tour began on May 16, 2014, in Camden, New Jersey, and finished on April 26, 2015, in Anchorage, Alaska.

== Crushin' It World Tour (2015–16) ==
The Crushin' It World Tour was Paisley's tenth headlining concert tour and was in support of his tenth studio album Moonshine in the Trunk (2014). It began on May 15, 2015, in Camden, New Jersey and finished on March 12, 2016, in Bloomington, Illinois. The tour played through amphitheaters and festivals across the United States and Canada.

== Life Amplified World Tour (2016–17) ==
The Life Amplified World Tour was Paisley's eleventh headlining concert tour. It began on May 19, 2016, in Wheatland, California and concluded on February 18, 2017, in Verona, New York, The tour played through amphitheaters and festivals across United States and Canada.

== Weekend Warrior Tour (2017–18) ==
The Weekend Warrior World Tour was Paisley's twelfth headlining concert tour by and was in support of his eleventh studio album Love and War (2017). It began on May 18, 2017, in Saratoga Springs, New York and finished on April 26, 2018, in Lincoln, Nebraska. The tour visited North America and Europe. "Weekend Warrior" derives from Paisley playing on weekends this tour. The tour was first announced in May 2017. The 2018 leg was announced in November 2017.

== Brad Paisley World Tour 2019 ==
Brad Paisley World Tour
- Tour by Brad Paisley
- Location: North America; Europe
- Start date: February 15, 2019
- End date: October 13, 2019
- Legs: 2
- No. of shows: 41 in North America; 7 in Europe; 48 total

Brad Paisley concert chronology
- Weekend Warrior World Tour (2017–18); Brad Paisley World Tour 2019 (2018); Tour 2021 (2021)

The Brad Paisley World Tour 2019 was Paisley's thirteenth headlining concert tour. It began on February 15, 2019, in San Antonio, Texas and finished on October 13, 2019, in Dublin, Ireland.

=== Opening acts ===
- Chris Lane
- Riley Green

=== Tour dates ===
| Date | City | Country | Venue | Opening acts |
North America
| February 15, 2019 (Note: The show on February 15, 2019, was a part of San Antonio Stock Show & Rodeo.) | San Antonio | United States | AT&T Center | —N/a |
| March 16, 2019 (Note: The show on March 16, 2019, was a part of Houston Rodeo.) | Houston | United States | NRG Stadium | —N/a |
| March 29, 2019 | Thackerville | United States | WinStar World Casino | —N/a |
| April 13, 2019 | Laughlin | United States | Laughlin Event Center | —N/a |
| April 26, 2019 | Ramara | Canada | Casino Rama | —N/a |
| April 27, 2019 | Windsor | Canada | Caesars Windsor | —N/a |
| May 30, 2019 | Albuquerque | United States | Isleta Amphitheater | Chris Lane; Riley Green |
| May 31, 2019 | Phoenix | United States | Ak-Chin Pavilion | Chris Lane; Riley Green |
| June 1, 2019 | Chula Vista | United States | North Island Credit Union Amphitheatre | Chris Lane; Riley Green |
| June 6, 2019 | Wheatland | United States | Toyota Amphitheatre | Chris Lane; Riley Green |
| June 7, 2019 | Mountain View | United States | Shoreline Amphitheatre | Chris Lane; Riley Green |
| June 8, 2019 | Irvine | United States | FivePoint Amphitheatre | Chris Lane; Riley Green |
| June 13, 2019 | West Valley City | United States | USANA Amphitheater | Chris Lane; Riley Green |
| June 14, 2019 | Missoula | United States | Big Sky Brewing Company | Chris Lane; Riley Green |
| June 15, 2019 | Ridgefield | United States | Sunlight Supply Amphitheater | Chris Lane; Riley Green |
| June 27, 2019 | Rogers | United States | Walmart Arkansas Music Pavilion | Chris Lane; Riley Green |
| June 28, 2019 | Maryland Heights | United States | Hollywood Casino Amphitheatre | Chris Lane; Riley Green |
| June 29, 2019 (Note: The show on June 29, 2019, was a part of Country USA.) | Oshkosh | United States | Country USA | —N/a |
| July 13, 2019 (Note: The show on July 13, 2019, was a part of Lakefront Park Music Fest.) | Prior Lake | United States | Lakefront Park Music Fest | Chris Lane; Riley Green |
| July 19, 2019 | Pelham | United States | Oak Mountain Amphitheatre | Chris Lane; Riley Green |
| July 20, 2019 | Noblesville | United States | Ruoff Home Mortgage Music Center | Chris Lane; Riley Green |
| July 21, 2019 | Cincinnati | United States | Riverbend Music Center | Chris Lane; Riley Green |
| July 25, 2019 | Saratoga Springs | United States | Saratoga Performing Arts Center | Chris Lane; Riley Green |
| July 26, 2019 | Syracuse | United States | St. Joseph's Health Amphitheater at Lakeview | Chris Lane; Riley Green |
| July 27, 2019 | Mansfield | United States | Xfinity Center | Chris Lane; Riley Green |
| August 2, 2019 | Cuyahoga Falls | United States | Blossom Music Center | Chris Lane; Riley Green |
| August 3, 2019 | Tinley Park | United States | Hollywood Casino Amphitheatre | Chris Lane; Riley Green |
| August 4, 2019 (Note: The show on August 4, 2019, was a part of the Mississippi Valley Fair.) | Davenport | United States | Mississippi Valley Center | —N/a |
| August 9, 2019 | Atlantic City | United States | Hard Rock Live | Chris Lane |
| August 10, 2019 | Bristow | United States | Jiffy Lube Live | Chris Lane; Riley Green |
| August 11, 2019 (Note: The show on August 11, 2019, was a part of Musikfest.) | Bethlehem | United States | Musikfest | —N/a |
| August 15, 2019 | Raleigh | United States | Coastal Credit Union Music Park | Chris Lane; Riley Green |
| August 16, 2019 | Jacksonville | United States | Daily's Place | Chris Lane; Riley Green |
| August 17, 2019 | West Palm Beach | United States | Coral Sky Amphitheatere | Chris Lane; Riley Green |
| August 22, 2019 | Orange Beach | United States | The Wharf Amphitheater | Chris Lane; Riley Green |
| August 23, 2019 | Alpharetta | United States | [[Ameris Bank Amphitheatre] | Chris Lane; Riley Green |
| August 24, 2019 | Charlotte | United States | PNC Music Pavilion | Chris Lane; Riley Green |
| August 29, 2019 | Hartford | United States | Xfinity Theatre | Chris Lane; Riley Green |
| August 30, 2019 | Wantagh | United States | Jones Beach Theater | Chris Lane; Riley Green |
| August 31, 2019 | Holmdel | United States | PNC Bank Arts Center | Chris Lane; Riley Green |
| September 22, 2019 (Note: The show on September 22, 2019, was a part of the Washington State Fair.) | Puyallup | United States | Washington State Fair | —N/a |
| October 4, 2019 | Oslo | Norway | Oslo Spektrum | Chris Lane |
| October 5, 2019 | Copenhagen | Denmark | Royal Arena | Chris Lane |
| October 6, 2019 | Stockholm | Sweden | Hovet | Chris Lane |
| October 9, 2019 | Berlin | Germany | Tempodrom | Chris Lane |
| October 11, 2019 | Tilburg | Netherlands | 013 Poppodium | Chris Lane |
| October 12, 2019 | London | England | The O2 | Chris Lane |
| October 13, 2019 | Dublin | Ireland | 3Arena]] | Chris Lane |

== Tour 2021 (2021) ==
Tour 2021
- Tour by Brad Paisley
- Location: North America
- Start date: June 5, 2021
- End date: October 9, 2021
- Legs: 1
- No. of shows: 30

Brad Paisley concert chronology
- Brad Paisley World Tour (2019); Tour 2021 (2021); World Tour 2022 (2022)

The Tour 2021 was Paisley's fourteenth headlining concert tour. It began on June 5, 2021, at the Pepsi Gulf Coast Jam in Panama City, Florida, and finished on October 9, in Irvine, California. Portion of ticket sales went to Paisley's nonprofit free-referral based grocery store he co-founded, The Store.

=== Opening acts ===
- Jimmie Allen
- Kameron Marlowe

=== Tour dates ===
| Date | City | Country | Venue |
|---|---|---|---|
| June 5, 2021 | Panama City | United States | Pepsi Gulf Coast Jam |
| July 4, 2021 | Nashville | United States | Let Freedom Sing! Music City |
| July 8, 2021 | Jacksonville | United States | Daily's Place |
| July 9, 2021 | Tampa | United States | MidFlorida Credit Union Amphitheatre |
| July 10, 2021 | West Palm Beach | United States | iTHINK Financial Amphitheatre |
| July 17, 2021 | Hinckley | United States | Grand Casino Hinckley |
| July 22, 2021 | Brandon | United States | Brandon Amphitheater |
| July 23, 2021 | Tuscaloosa | United States | Tuscaloosa Amphitheater |
| July 24, 2021 | Alpharetta | United States | Ameris Bank Amphitheatre |
| July 30, 2021 | Maryland Heights | United States | Hollywood Casino Amphitheatre |
| July 31, 2021 | Noblesville | United States | Ruoff Music Center |
| August 9, 2021 | Canton | United States | Tom Benson Hall of Fame Stadium |
| August 14, 2021 | Dallas | United States | Dos Equis Pavilion |
| August 15, 2021 | The Woodlands | United States | Cynthia Woods Mitchell Pavilion |
| August 21, 2021 | Lima | United States | Allen County Fair |
| August 22, 2021 | Cincinnati | United States | The ICON Festival Stage |
| August 27, 2021 | Raleigh | United States | Coastal Credit Union Music Park |
| August 28, 2021 | Charlotte | United States | PNC Music Pavilion |
| August 29, 2021 | Virginia Beach | United States | Veterans United Home Loans Amphitheater |
| September 10, 2021 | Tinley Park | United States | Hollywood Casino Amphitheatre |
| September 11, 2021 | Clarkston | United States | Pine Knob Music Theatre |
| September 23, 2021 | Doswell | United States | The Meadow Event Park |
| September 24, 2021 | West Springfield | United States | Court of Honor Stage |
| September 26, 2021 | Bloomsburg | United States | Bloomsburg Fair |
| September 30, 2021 | Wheatland | United States | Toyota Amphitheatre |
| October 1, 2021 | Mountain View | United States | Shoreline Amphitheatre |
| October 2, 2021 | Chula Vista | United States | North Island Credit Union Amphitheatre |
| October 7, 2021 | Albuquerque | United States | Isleta Amphitheater |
| October 8, 2021 | Phoenix | United States | Ak-Chin Pavilion |
| October 9, 2021 | Irvine | United States | FivePoint Amphitheater |

Notes

- The August 9 show was co-headlined with Lynyrd Skynyrd.

== World Tour 2022 (2022) ==
World Tour 2022
- Tour by Brad Paisley
- Location: North America
- Start date: May 27, 2022
- End date: September 17, 2022
- Legs: 1
- No. of shows: 30

Brad Paisley concert chronology
- Tour 2021 (2021); World Tour 2022 (2022)

The World Tour 2022 was Paisley's fifteenth headlining concert tour. It began on May 27, 2022, in Uncasville, Connecticut and finished on September 17, in McHenry, Illinois.

=== Opening acts ===
- Tracy Lawrence
- Scotty McCreery
- Morgan Evans
- Tenille Townes
- Caylee Hammack

=== Tour dates ===
| Date | City | Country | Venue |
|---|---|---|---|
| May 27, 2022 | Uncasville | United States | Mohegan Sun Arena |
| May 29, 2022 | Windsor | Canada | Caesars Windsor |
| June 2, 2022 | Burgettstown | United States | The Pavilion at Star Lake |
| June 3, 2022 | Camden | United States | Freedom Mortgage Pavilion |
| June 4, 2022 | Bethel | United States | Bethel Woods Center for the Arts |
| June 10, 2022 | Simpsonville | United States | CCNB Amphitheatre |
| June 11, 2022 | Virginia Beach | United States | Veterans United Home Loans Amphitheater |
| June 24, 2022 | Greeley | United States | Greeley Independence Stampede |
| June 25, 2022 | Fort Hall | United States | Shoshone-Bannock Hotel Casino |
| August 12, 2022 | Albuquerque | United States | Sandia Resort and Casino |
| August 13, 2022 | Tucson | United States | Anselmo Valencia Tori Amphitheater |
| August 18, 2022 | Murphys | United States | Ironstone Amphitheater |
| August 19, 2022 | Irvine | United States | FivePoint Amphitheatre |
| August 20, 2022 | Temecula | United States | Pechanga Resort & Casino |
| August 24, 2022 | Put-in-Bay | United States | Bash on the Bay Country Music Fest |
| August 25, 2022 | Syracuse | United States | St. Joseph's Health Amphitheater |
| August 26, 2022 | Niagara Falls | Canada | Niagara Fallsview Entertainment Centre |
| September 17, 2022 | McHenry | United States | Splash Into Country |

== Son of the Mountains World Tour (2024) ==
Son of the Mountains World Tour
- Tour by Brad Paisley
- Location: Europe
- Start date: February 27, 2024
- End date: March 10, 2024
- Legs: 1
- No. of shows: 9

Brad Paisley concert chronology
- World Tour 2022 (2022]; Son of the Mountains World Tour (2023); Truck Still Works Tour (2025)

The Son of the Mountains World Tour was Paisley's sixteenth headlining concert tour. It began on February 27, 2024, in Reykjavík, Iceland and finished on March 10, 2024, in Belfast, Northern Ireland. Five of the dates were a part of the C2C: Country to Country musical festival. This was Paisley's only tour that took place outside of North America.

=== Tour dates ===
| Date | City | Country | Venue |
|---|---|---|---|
| February 27, 2024 | Reykjavík | Iceland | Harpa Eldborg Hall |
| February 29, 2024 | Zurich | Switzerland | The Hall |
| March 2, 2024 (Note: The show on March 2, 2024, was a part of C2C: Country to Country.) | Rotterdam | Netherlands | Rotterdam Ahoy |
| March 3, 2024 (Note: The show on March 3, 2024, was a part of C2C: Country to Country.) | Berlin | Germany | VertinMusic Hall |
| March 5, 2024 | Stockholm | Sweden | Hovet |
| March 6, 2024 | Oslo | Norway | Oslo Spektrum |
| March 8, 2024 (Note: The show on March 8, 2024, was a part of C2C: Country to Country.) | Glasgow | Scotland | OVO Hydro |
| March 9, 2024 (Note: The show on March 9, 2024, was a part of C2C: Country to Country.) | London | England | The O2 |
| March 10, 2024 (Note: The show on March 10, 2024, was a part of C2C: Country to Country.) | Belfast | Northern Ireland | SSE Arena |
