= Virtual Reality World Tour =

2012 concert tour by Brad Paisley

- Tour by Brad Paisley
- Virtual Reality Tour poster
- Associated album: This Is Country Music
- Start date: May 9, 2012
- End date: November 13, 2012
- Legs: 3
- No. of shows: 68
- Box office: $33,794,719

Brad Paisley concert chronology
- H2O II: Wetter and Wilder World Tour (2011); Virtual Reality Tour (2012); Beat This Summer Tour (2013–14)

The Virtual Reality World Tour was the seventh headlining tour by American country music singer Brad Paisley and was in support of his eighth studio album, This Is Country Music (2011). The tour began on January 12, 2012, in Grand Rapids, Michigan and ended on November 13, 2012, in Dublin, Ireland. It ranked sixteen for Billboard's Top 25 Tours of 2012.

== Background ==
The tour was originally going to be called The Camobunga! 2012 World Tour but changed to the Virtual Reality World Tour in January 2012. The second leg of the tour was announced on March 6, 2012.

== Commercial reception ==
The tour ranked sixteen for Billboard's Top 25 Tours of 2012, the total gross revenue was $33,794,719, a total attendance of 485,852 and thirty one sold-out shows.

== Opening acts ==
- The Band Perry (North America & Europe)
- Scotty McCreery (North America)
- Easton Corbin (North America)
- Miranda Lambert (June 9, 2012)
- Chris Young (June 9, 2012)
- Pistol Annies (June 9, 2012)
- Jerrod Niemann (June 9, 2012)

Virtual Opry Stage: (Select dates; North America only)

- Love and Theft
- Jana Kramer
- Kristen Kelly

Notes
None of the opening acts performed at the music festivals

== Setlist ==
=== North America ===
1. "Camouflage"
2. "The World"
3. "Welcome to the Future"
4. "Ticks"
5. "This Is Country Music"
6. "Waitin' on a Woman"
7. "Celebrity" (with Scotty McCreery
8. "I'm Still a Guy"
9. "She's Everything"
10. "Southern Comfort Zone"
11. "Online"
12. "Then"
13. "Letter to Me"
14. "Mud on the Tires"
15. "Whiskey Lullaby" (with Kimberly Perry)
16. "The Nervous Breakdown"
17. "I'm Gonna Miss Her (The Fishin' Song)"
18. "Remind Me" (with Carrie Underwood on video except March 2 when she surprised Paisley and sung in person.)
19. "Old Alabama"
20. "Water"
  Encore
21. "American Saturday Night"
22. "Alcohol"

=== Europe ===
1. "Southern Comfort Zone"
2. "The World"
3. "Ticks"
4. "This Is Country Music"
5. "Waitin' on a Woman"
6. "Celebrity"
7. "Me Neither"
8. "I'm Still a Guy"
9. "She's Everything"
10. "Online"
11. "Then"
12. Medley
  - "We Danced"
  - "Anything Like Me"
  - "Ode De Toilet (The Toilet Song)"
13. "Mud on the Tires" (acoustic)
14. "Whiskey Lullaby" (with Kimberly Perry) (acoustic)
15. "Time Warp" (acoustic)
16. "I'm Gonna Miss Her (The Fishin' Song)" (acoustic)
17. "Old Alabama" (acoustic)
18. "Water" (acoustic)
19. "Welcome to the Future" (acoustic)
  Encore
20. "American Saturday Night"
21. "Alcohol"

== Tour dates ==
Date	City	Country	Venue
North America leg #1
January 12, 2012	Grand Rapids	United States	Van Andel Arena
January 13, 2012	Milwaukee	United States	Bradley Center
January 14, 2012	St. Paul	United States	Xcel Energy Center
January 19, 2012	Kansas City	United States	Sprint Center
January 20, 2012	Wichita	United States	Intrust Bank Arena
January 21, 2012	Denver	United States	Pepsi Center
January 26, 2012	Boise	United States	Idaho Center
January 27, 2012	West Valley City	United States	Maverik Center
January 28, 2012	Las Vegas	United States	Mandalay Bay Events Center
February 9, 2012	Spokane	United States	Spokane Arena
February 10, 2012	Eugene	United States	Matthew Knight Arena
February 11, 2012	Tacoma	United States	Tacoma Dome
February 16, 2012	Lubbock	United States	United Spirit Arena
February 17, 2012	Las Cruces	United States	Pan American Center
February 23, 2012	Madison	United States	Alliant Energy Center
February 24, 2012	Moline	United States	iWireless Center
February 25, 2012	Springfield	United States	JQH Arena
March 1, 2012	Baltimore	United States	1st Mariner Arena
March 2, 2012	Knoxville	United States	Thompson–Boling Arena
March 3, 2012	Lexington	United States	Rupp Arena
North America leg #2
May 18, 2012	Maryland Heights	United States	Verizon Wireless Amphitheatre
May 19, 2012	Noblesville	United States	Klipsch Music Center
May 20, 2012	Cincinnati	United States	Riverbend Music Center
June 1, 2012	Wantagh	United States	Nikon at Jones Beach Theatre
June 2, 2012	Hartford	United States	Comcast Theatre
June 3, 2012	Mansfield	United States	Comcast Center
June 9, 2012	Chicago	United States	Wrigley Field
June 15, 2012	Cuyhoga Falls	United States	Blossom Music Center
June 16, 2012	Clarkston	United States	DTE Energy Music Theatre
June 22, 2012^{[A]}	Oshkosh	United States	Country USA Festival
June 23, 2012^{[B]}	Cadott	United States	Chippewa Valley Country Festival
June 29, 2012	Saratoga Springs	United States	Saratoga Performing Arts Center
June 30, 2012	Camden	United States	Susquehanna Bank Center
July 14, 2012^{[C]}	Calgary	Canada	Calgary Stampede
July 15, 2012^{[D]}	Craven	Canada	Craven Country Jamboree
July 20, 2012^{[E]}	Omaha	United States	TD Ameritrade Park Omaha
July 21, 2012	Cheyenne	United States	Cheyenne Frontier Days
July 26, 2012	Wheatland	United States	Sleep Train Amphitheatre
July 27, 2012	Mountain View	United States	Shoreline Amphitheatre
July 28, 2012	Lake Tahoe	United States	Harveys Outdoor Arena
August 10, 2012	Bethel Woods	United States	Bethel Woods Center for the Arts
August 11, 2012	Darien	United States	Darien Lake Performing Arts Center
August 12, 2012	Ottawa	Canada	Walter Baker Park
August 16, 2012	Tulsa	United States	BOK Center
August 17, 2012	Southaven	United States	Snowden Grove Amphitheatre
August 18, 2012	Dallas	United States	Gexa Energy Pavilion
August 24, 2012	Raleigh	United States	Time Warner Cable Music Pavilion
August 25, 2012	Bristow	United States	Jiffy Lube Live
September 13, 2012	Virginia Beach	United States	Farm Bureau Live
September 14, 2012	Charlotte	United States	Verizon Wireless Amphitheatre
September 15, 2012	Atlanta	United States	Aaron's Amphitheatre
September 27, 2012	Jacksonville	United States	Jacksonville Veterans Memorial Arena
September 28, 2012	Tampa	United States	1-800-ASK-GARY Amphitheatre
September 29, 2012	West Palm Beach	United States	Cruzan Amphitheatre
October 4, 2012	Evansville	United States	Ford Center
October 5, 2012	Columbus	United States	Nationwide Arena
October 6, 2012	Hershey	United States	Giant Center
October 11, 2012	North Little Rock	United States	Verizon Arena
October 12, 2012	Bossier City	United States	CenturyLink Center
October 13, 2012	New Orleans	United States	New Orleans Arena
October 17, 2012	Phoenix	United States	Ashley Furniture HomeStore Pavilion
October 18, 2012	Chula Vista	United States	Sleep Train Amphitheatre
October 20, 2012	Los Angeles	United States	Hollywood Bowl
Europe
November 8, 2012	Stockholm	Sweden	Stockholm Waterfront
November 9, 2012	Gothenburg	Sweden	Lisebergshallen
November 10, 2012	Oslo	Norway	Oslo Spektrum
November 11, 2012	Stavanger	Norway	DNB Arena
November 13, 2012	Dublin	Ireland	The O_{2}

Festivals and other miscellaneous performances
^{A} This concert is a part of Country USA Festival.
^{B} This concert is a part of the Chippewa Valley Country Festival.
^{C} This concert is a part of the Calgary Stampede.
^{D} This concert is a part of the Craven Country Jamboree.
^{E} This concert is a part of the Red Sky Music Festival.
