= Burn the Ships World Tour =

2018–2020 concert tour by For King & Country

- Tour by For King & Country
- Promotional poster for the tour
- Associated album: Burn the Ships
- Start date: 21 September 2018
- End date: 13 March 2020
- Legs: 8
- No. of shows: 137

For King & Country concert chronology
- joy.UNLEASHED (2018); Burn the Ships World Tour (2018–2020); Little Drummer Boy Christmas Tour (2018)

The Burn the Ships World Tour was the fifth headlining concert tour by Australian christian rock band For King & Country. The tour was by far their longest, and was their first tour to go outside of the United States and Canada. The band performed over 130 shows in the United States, Canada, Australia, New Zealand, Singapore, and the Philippines. The first leg of the tour began in fall 2018, and the last leg of the tour concluded in spring 2020, due to the COVID-19 pandemic in Canada.

== Background ==
For King & Country announced the Burn the Ships | Album Release Tour, presented by AEG, to support the album in August 2018. The tour ran from 2 to 27 October 2018 with For King & Country performing in a dozen shows across the United States, commencing the tour at the Shubert Theatre in Boston, Massachusetts, and ending the tour at the Moore Theatre in Seattle, Washington.

In November 2018, For King & Country announced that they will be embarking on the Burn the Ships | World Tour 2019, also in support of the album, with Josh Baldwin set to perform on select dates. The tour launched on 26 January 2019 at the La Vida Centre in Christchurch, New Zealand and concluded on 20 April 2019 at the Julie Rogers Theatre in Beaumont, Texas, with stops in cities across Australia, New Zealand, Singapore, the Philippines and the United States.

On 30 April 2019, the duo announced the fall addition of the Burn the Ships World Tour, which visited arenas in the United States and Canada. The tour began on 26 September 2019 at the CURE Insurance Arena in Trenton, New Jersey, and concluded at on 24 November 2019 the Bon Secours Wellness Arena in Greenville, South Carolina.

In December 2019, the band announced a new Canadian leg of the tour, with stops in eight cities, which was set begin at the TD Place Arena in Ottawa on 12 March 2020 and end at the Orpheum in Vancouver on 24 March 2020. This leg was suspended, then cancelled after COVID-19 pandemic in Canada set in after the show at the Meridian Hall in Toronto on 13 March. In 2023, over 3 years and 1,000 days after the Canadian dates were originally scheduled, the band toured back in Canada at the same venues and locations that were originally scheduled, as part of their What Are We Waiting For Tour.

== Tour dates ==
List of 2018 concerts, showing date, venue, city, region and country
Date	City	Country	Venue
21 September 2018 (Note: The show on 21 September 2018 was part of the 95.9 The Fish Family Night.)	Irvine	United States	FivePoint Amphitheatre
22 September 2018 (Note: The show on 22 September 2018 was part of GraceFest.)	Palmdale	United States	Palmdale Amphitheater
23 September 2018 (Note: The show on 23 September 2018 was part of Kingdom Come Fest.)	Sacramento	United States	Papa Murphy's Park
2 October 2018	Boston	United States	Shubert Theatre
3 October 2018	New York City	United States	PlayStation Theater
5 October 2018	Roanoke	United States	Berglund Center
7 October 2018	Cleveland	United States	Conn Center
8 October 2018	Norfolk	United States	The NorVa
11 October 2018	Houston	United States	The Ballroom at Warehouse Live
12 October 2018	Dallas	United States	The Bomb Factory
14 October 2018 (Note: 2 shows.)	Nashville	United States	Ryman Auditorium
20 October 2018	Denver	United States	Paramount Theatre
23 October 2018	Los Angeles	United States	The Theatre at Ace Hotel
25 October 2018	San Francisco	United States	The Warfield
27 October 2018	Seattle	United States	Moore Theatre
3 November 2018	St. John's	Canada	Mile One Centre

List of 2019 concerts, showing date, venue, city, region and country
Date	City	Country	Venue
25 January 2019	Christchurch	New Zealand	La Vida Centre
26 January 2019 (Note: The show on 26 January 2019 was part of Festival One.)	Hamilton	New Zealand	Mystery Creek Events Centre
28 January 2019	Sydney	Australia	Sydney Opera House
29 January 2019	Newcastle	Australia	Grainery Church
30 January 2019	Brisbane	Australia	Riverlife Baptist Church
31 January 2019	Gold Coast	Australia	Newlife Church
1 February 2019	Moreton Bay	Australia	Mueller Performing Arts Centre
3 February 2019	Melbourne	Australia	Palais Theatre
6 February 2019	Adelaide	Australia	Influencers Church
7 February 2019	Perth	Australia	Riverview Church
9 February 2019 (Note: the show on February 9 2019 was part of Found Music Festival in Makati City, Philippines.)	Makati	Philippines	Circuit Makati
11 February 2019 (Note: with support by Annette Lee.)	Singapore		
7 March 2019 (Note: The show on 7 March 2019 was part of the Florida Strawberry Festival.)	Plant City	United States	Wish Farms Sound Stage
8 March 2019	Augusta	United States	Bell Auditorium
9 March 2019	Franklin	United States	Smoky Mountain Center for the Performing Arts
10 March 2019	Savannah	United States	Savannah Civic Center
11 March 2019	Dothan	United States	Dothan Civic Center
15 March 2019	Knoxville	United States	Knoxville Civic Coliseum
16 March 2019	Troy	United States	Hobart Arena
17 March 2019	Chattanooga	United States	Tivoli Theatre
21 March 2019	Lafayette	United States	Heymann Performing Arts Center
22 March 2019	Birmingham	United States	Wright Center at Samford University
23 March 2019	Paducah	United States	Carson Center
24 March 2019	Wichita	United States	Century II Performing Arts & Convention Center
28 March 2019	Stamford	United States	Stamford Center for the Arts
29 March 2019	Indiana	United States	Kovalchick Convention and Athletic Complex
30 March 2019	Wheeling	United States	Capitol Theatre
31 March 2019	Salisbury	United States	Wicomico Youth and Civic Center
4 April 2019	Saginaw	United States	Dow Event Center
5 April 2019	Marion	United States	Indiana Wesleyan University
6 April 2019	Memphis	United States	Orpheum Theatre
7 April 2019	Peoria	United States	Peoria Civic Center
11 April 2019	Wichita Falls	United States	Memorial Auditorium
12 April 2019	Midland	United States	Wagner Noël Performing Arts Center
13 April 2019	Belton	United States	Bell County Expo Center
14 April 2019	Amarillo	United States	Amarillo Civic Center
16 April 2019	El Paso	United States	Abraham Chavez Theatre
18 April 2019	Longview	United States	Belcher Center
19 April 2019	Austin	United States	Frank Erwin Center
20 April 2019	Beaumont	United States	Julie Rogers Theater
5 May 2019 (Note: Texas Rangers concert series.)	Arlington	United States	Globe Life Park
11 May 2019 (Note: The show on 11 May 2019 was part of the Flowood Family Festival.)	Flowood	United States	Liberty Park
18 May 2019	Meansville	United States	Hickory Ridge Golf Club
19 May 2019	Red Deer	Canada	ENMAX Centrium
1 June 2019 (Note: The show on 1 June 2019 was part of Christian Music Day.)	Charlotte	United States	Carowinds Paladium
6 June 2019	Henderson	United States	Central Christian Church
7 June 2019 (Note: The shows on 7–9 June 2019 were part of Spirit West Coast.)	Concord	United States	Concord Pavilion
8 June 2019	Ontario	United States	Toyota Arena
9 June 2019	Chula Vista	United States	North Island Credit Union Amphitheatre
21 June 2019 (Note: The show on 21 June 2019 was part of Spirit Song.)	Mason	United States	Timberwolf Amphitheatre
22 June 2019 (Note: The show on 22 June 2019 was part of Kingsfest.)	Doswell	United States	Kingswood Amphitheatre
27 June 2019 (Note: The show on 27 June 2019 was part of the Big Ticket Festival.)	Gaylord	United States	Otsego County Fairgrounds
29 June 2019 (Note: The show on 29 June 2019 was part of the Celebrate Freedom Week.)	Fort Worth	United States	Texas Motor Speedway
30 June 2019 (Note: The show on 30 June 2019 was part of the Greeley Stampede.)	Greeley	United States	Island Grove Regional Park
6 July 2019	Madisonville	United States	Madisonville City Park
11 July 2019 (Note: The show on 11 July 2019 was part of Lifest.)	Oshkosh	United States	Sunnyview Exposition Center
12 July 2019	Olathe	United States	Olathe Community Park
14 July 2019 (Note: The show on 14 July 2019 was part of the LaGrange County Fair.)	LaGrange	United States	LaGrange County 4-H Fairgrounds
19 July 2019 (Note: The show on 19 July 2019 was part of Alive Festival.)	Mineral City	United States	Atwood Lake Park
20 July 2019 (Note: The show on 20 July 2019 was part of the Hills Alive festival.)	Rapid City	United States	Memorial Park
27 July 2019 (Note: The show on 27 July 2019 was part of the Magic Springs Concert Series.)	Hot Springs	United States	Timberwood Amphitheater
28 July 2019 (Note: The show on 28 July 2019 was part of the Ozark Empire Fair.)	Springfield	United States	Ozark Empire Fairgrounds
30 July 2019 (Note: The show on 30 July 2019 was part of Kingdom Bound.)	Darien Center	United States	Darien Lake Performing Arts Center
1 August 2019 (Note: The show on 1 August 2019 was part of SoulFest.)	Gilford	United States	Gunstock Mountain Resort
2 August 2019	Huntsville	United States	Propst Arena
5 August 2019 (Note: The show on 5 August 2019 was part of the Wisconsin State Fair.)	Milwaukee	United States	Wisconsin State Fair Park
8 August 2019 (Note: The show on 8 August 2019 was part of the Iowa State Fair.)	Des Moines	United States	Iowa State Fairgrounds
10 August 2019 (Note: The show on 10 August 2019 was part of the Frontier City Summer Concert Series.)	Oklahoma City	United States	Frontier City
15 August 2019 (Note: The show on 15 August 2019 was part of the Missouri State Fair.)	Sedalia	United States	Missouri State Fairgrounds
16 August 2019	Lincoln	United States	Lincoln Berean Church
17 August 2019	Gothenburg	United States	Gothenburg 4Plex
19 August 2019 (Note: The show on 19 August 2019 was part of the Kentucky State Fair.)	Louisville	United States	Kentucky Exposition Center
23 August 2019 (Note: The show on 23 August 2019 was part of the SoCal Harvest Fest.)	Anaheim	United States	Angel Stadium
24 August 2019 (Note: The show on 24 August 2019 was part of Rock the Smokies.)	Pigeon Forge	United States	Dollywood
31 August 2019	Wilkesboro	United States	Wilkes Community College
13 September 2019 (Note: The show on 13 September 2019 was part of the Arizona Diamondbacks Faith & Family Night.)	Phoenix	United States	Chase Field
14 September 2019 (Note: The show on 14 September 2019 was part of the Uprise Festival.)	Shippensburg	United States	Shippensburg Fairgrounds
26 September 2019	Trenton	United States	CURE Insurance Arena
27 September 2019	Ypsilanti	United States	Eastern Michigan University Convocation Center
28 September 2019	Hoffman Estates	United States	Sears Centre Arena
29 September 2019	Nashville	United States	Ascend Amphitheater
30 September 2019 (Note: The show on 30 September 2019 was part of the Tulsa State Fair.)	Tulsa	United States	Oklahoma Stage
3 October 2019	Muskegon	United States	LC Walker Arena
4 October 2019	Indianapolis	United States	Bankers Life Field House
5 October 2019	St. Charles	United States	Family Arena
6 October 2019	North Little Rock	United States	Simmons Bank Arena
10 October 2019	Atlanta	United States	Fox Theatre
11 October 2019	Pensacola	United States	Pensacola Bay Center
12 October 2019	Orlando	United States	Addition Financial Arena
13 October 2019	Tampa	United States	Amalie Arena
17 October 2019	Broomfield	United States	1stBank Center
18 October 2019	West Valley City	United States	Maverik Center
19 October 2019	Albuquerque	United States	Tingley Coliseum
20 October 2019	Tucson	United States	Tucson Convention Center
22 October 2019	Reno	United States	Reno Events Center
24 October 2019	San Diego	United States	Viejas Arena
25 October 2019	Irvine	United States	Bren Events Center
26 October 2019	Sacramento	United States	Sacramento Memorial Auditorium
27 October 2019	Salem	United States	The Pavilion
1 November 2019	Boise	United States	ExtraMile Arena
2 November 2019	Abbotsford	Canada	Abbotsford Centre
3 November 2019	Everett	United States	Angel of the Winds Arena
5 November 2019	Casper	United States	Casper Events Center
7 November 2019	Madison	United States	Alliant Energy Center
8 November 2019	Cedar Rapids	United States	Alliant Energy PowerHouse
9 November 2019	Minneapolis	United States	Target Center
10 November 2019	Omaha	United States	Baxter Arena
11 November 2019 (Note: The show on 11 November 2019 was recorded for The for KING & COUNTRY LIVE CONCERT FILM.)	Hidalgo	United States	Payne Arena
14 November 2019	Hidalgo	United States	Payne Arena
15 November 2019	Arlington	United States	College Park Center
16 November 2019	Cypress	United States	Berry Center of Northwest Houston
17 November 2019	New Orleans	United States	Lakefront Arena
22 November 2019	Catonsville	United States	UMBC Event Center
23 November 2019	Louisville	United States	KFC Yum! Center
24 November 2019	Greenville	United States	Bon Secours Wellness Arena
2 December 2019	Columbus	United States	KEMBA Live!
28 December 2019 (Note: The shows on 28 and 30 December 2019 were part of the Xtreme Conference.)	Gatlinburg	United States	Gatlinburg Convention Center
30 December 2019	Gatlinburg	United States	Gatlinburg Convention Center
29 January 2020 (Note: The show on 29 January 2020 was part of the K-Love cruise.)	Orlando	United States	Independence of the Seas

List of 2020 concerts, showing date, venue, city, region and country
Date	City	Country	Venue
12 March 2020	Ottawa	Canada	TD Place Arena
13 March 2020	Toronto	Canada	Meridian Hall

Cancelled dates

List of 2020 concerts, showing date, venue, city, region and country
Date	City	Country	Venue	Reason
14 March 2020	Montreal	Canada	Theatre St Denis	COVID-19 pandemic
18 March 2020	Winnipeg	Canada	Centennial Concert Hall	COVID-19 pandemic
19 March 2020	Saskatoon	Canada	Elim	COVID-19 pandemic
20 March 2020	Edmonton	Canada	Christcity	COVID-19 pandemic
22 March 2020	Calgary	Canada	WinSport	COVID-19 pandemic
24 March 2020	Vancouver	Canada	The Orpheum	COVID-19 pandemic
