= Burn the Ships (disambiguation) =

Burn the ships is a command that is said to have been given at several moments in military history, most popularly attributed to Hernán Cortés in the Spanish conquest of the Aztec Empire, although it is a factually inaccurate description of what Cortés ordered done (which was to scuttle his ships rather than burn them). It has become popular as a motivational phrase symbolizing commitment to a course of action without making allowances for the possibility of retreat.

Burn the Ships may also refer to:

- Burn the Ships, a 2018 album by the Australian Christian pop duo For King & Country
  - "Burn the Ships" (song), the title track on the album
  - Burn the Ships World Tour, a 2018–2020 concert tour that followed the release of the album
- Burn the Ships, a 2017 album by the Texas rock band Blacktop Mojo
