= Play: The Guitar Album =

Play

Studio album by Brad Paisley
- Released: November 4, 2008
- Studio: The Castle (Franklin, Tennessee); Blackbird (Nashville, Tennessee); Digital Insight (Las Vegas, Nevada)
- Genre: Country
- Length: 62:06
- Label: Arista Nashville
- Producer: Frank Rogers

Brad Paisley chronology
5th Gear (2007)	Play (2008)	Playlist: The Very Best of Brad Paisley (2009)

Singles from Play
- 1. "Start a Band" Released: September 15, 2008

Professional ratings
Aggregate scores
Source	Rating
Metacritic	(70/100)
Review scores
Source	Rating
Allmusic	3.5/5 stars
Billboard	(favorable)
Blender	3/5 stars
Entertainment Weekly	B−
Hartford Courant	(favorable)
Los Angeles Times	3.5/4 stars
Mojo	3/5 stars
Slant	4/5 stars
Uncut	2/5 stars
USA Today	3.5/4 stars
The Village Voice	(positive)

Play: The Guitar Album is the seventh studio album by American musician Brad Paisley. It was released on November 4, 2008 (see 2008 in country music). Like all of his previous albums, Play was released on Arista Nashville and produced by Frank Rogers.

The album is largely instrumental in nature, except for five vocal tracks, and strays from Paisley's usual country music output to touch on other styles of music. One of these tracks, "Start a Band" (a duet with Keith Urban), has been released as a single and has become Paisley's ninth consecutive Number One country hit, and his thirteenth overall. The album cover photograph was taken at Bristow Run Elementary School in Bristow, Virginia.

== Content ==
Play is largely an album of instrumentals, though Paisley sings five duets with other vocalists, including B.B. King, Buck Owens, and Keith Urban. King and Urban both play guitar on their respective duet tracks. Another track, "Cluster Pluck", features James Burton, Vince Gill, Albert Lee, John Jorgenson, Brent Mason, Redd Volkaert and Steve Wariner. The Buck Owens duet is a song which Owens co-wrote. It is not strictly a country music record, featuring jazz guitar and a song described by Paisley as "very heavy metal." The final track, "Waitin' on a Woman", was first included on Paisley's 2005 album Time Well Wasted, and was later re-recorded as a bonus track to 2007's 5th Gear, from which it was released as a single. The version featured here includes guest vocals from Andy Griffith, and is the version used in the song's music video.

"Start a Band", the only single from the album, was released in September 2008. It is a collaboration with Keith Urban, who sings duet vocals and plays second lead guitar on it, and it reached Number One on the Billboard country singles charts in January 2009. At the 51st Grammy Awards, "Cluster Pluck" won the Grammy for Best Country Instrumental Performance, which was awarded to all of the guitarists featured.

== Reception ==
The album so far has a score of 70 out of 100 from Metacritic based on "generally favorable reviews". Chris Neal of Country Weekly magazine gave Play four stars out of five, calling it "as indispensable as any album Brad has recorded to date—not to mention one of his best", also noting the "sharp melodies and constantly shifting musical terrain". Play received three-and-a-half stars out of five from Allmusic critic Stephen Thomas Erlewine, who referred to most songs as "fall[ing] within the realm of the expected", but cited others as "pure '80s shred[…]revealing a side he's previously camouflaged." Erlewine also said that, like Paisley's other albums, Play was "among the most adventurous and best country music of this decade." Ken Tucker of Billboard called the album "both outstanding and diverse" and made note of the Buck Owens duet, which he referred to as "bring[ing] an old friend back to life with the utmost respect."

Whitney Pastorek, reviewing the album for Entertainment Weekly, gave the album a B− rating. She referred to the duets as "a welcome respite from all the noodling", but said that as a whole, the album was "an indulgence he's earned but doesn't quite pull off." In his Consumer Guide, Robert Christgau picked out one song from the album, "Waitin' on a Woman", as a "choice cut", calling it "a good song on an album that isn't worth your time or money".

== Track listing ==
No.	Title	Writer(s)	Length
1.	"Huckleberry Jam"	Brad Paisley; Frank Rogers	2:52
2.	"Turf's Up"	Paisley; Rogers	3:30
3.	"Start a Band" (with Keith Urban)	Dallas Davidson; Ashley Gorley; Kelley Lovelace	5:26
4.	"Kim"	Paisley	3:58
5.	"Departure"	Paisley, Rogers	4:28
6.	"Come On In" (featuring Buck Owens)	Owens	3:53
7.	"Kentucky Jelly"	Paisley; Rogers; Mac McAnally	2:43
8.	"Playing with Fire"	Paisley; Robert Arthur	4:51
9.	"More Than Just This Song" (featuring Steve Wariner)	Paisley; Wariner	5:14
10.	"Les Is More"	Paisley; Rogers	3:18
11.	"Pre-Cluster Cluster Pluck Prequel" (A.K.A. "From Uncle Jimmy to Justin")	Paisley; Rogers; Kevin "Swine" Grantt	1:34
12.	"Cluster Pluck" (featuring James Burton, Vince Gill, Albert Lee, John Jorgenson, Brent Mason, Redd Volkaert, Steve Wariner)	Paisley; Rogers; Grantt	3:31
13.	"Cliffs of Rock City"	Paisley; Arthur	3:44
14.	"Let the Good Times Roll" (featuring B. B. King)	Fleecie Moore; Sam Theard	5:30
15.	"What a Friend We Have in Jesus"	Traditional	2:31
16.	"Waitin' on a Woman" (featuring Andy Griffith)	Don Sampson; Wynn Varble	5:02
Total length:			62:06

== Personnel ==
- Brad Paisley – lead and backing vocals (3, 6, 9, 11, 14, 16), electric guitar (1–14, 16), baritone guitar (1, 2, 4, 5, 7, 9), acoustic guitar (3, 4, 7, 9, 15, 16), mandolin (4, 7)
- Jim "Moose" Brown" – Farfisa organ (2), Hammond B3 organ (4, 5, 8, 16), Wurlitzer electric piano (4), acoustic piano (10)
- Bernie Herms – acoustic piano (16)
- Gordon Mote – acoustic piano (16)
- Gary Hooker – electric rhythm guitar (3, 14), 12-string electric guitar (7), baritone guitar (8), electric guitar (13), acoustic guitar (16)
- Keith Urban – electric guitar (3), lead vocals (3)
- Frank Rogers – acoustic guitar (6), Hammond B3 organ (13), 12-string electric guitar (16)
- Robert Arthur – electric rhythm guitar (8), acoustic guitar (13)
- Steve Wariner – electric guitar (9, 11, 12), lead vocals (9)
- James Burton – electric guitar (11, 12)
- Vince Gill – electric guitar (11, 12)
- John Jorgenson – electric guitar (11, 12)
- Albert Lee – electric guitar (11, 12)
- Brent Mason – electric guitar (11, 12)
- Redd Volkaert – electric guitar (11, 12)
- B.B. King – electric guitar (14), lead vocals (14)
- Bryan Sutton – acoustic guitar (16)
- Kendall Marcy – banjo (1, 7, 13), keyboards (16)
- Randel Currie – steel guitar (1–6, 8, 9, 10, 13, 14, 16)
- Buck Owens – dobro (6), mandolin (6), lead vocals (6)
- Kevin "Swine" Grantt – bass guitar (1, 2, 5, 6, 8, 11–14, 16), fretless bass (4), upright bass (7, 10)
- Kenny Lewis – bass guitar (3), backing vocals (16)
- Ben Sesar – drums (1–14, 16)
- Eric Darken – percussion (3–6, 9, 12, 13, 14, 16)
- Justin Williamson – fiddle (1, 3, 6–9, 13, 14, 16)
- Aubrey Haynie – fiddle (16)
- Wes Hightower – backing vocals (3, 6, 9, 16)
- Snoop Dogg – spoken intro (7)
- Little Jimmy Dickens – voice (11)
- Manny Rogers – voice (11)
- Andy Griffith – lead vocals (16)

Toy Band on "Huckleberry Jam"

- Brad Paisley – electric guitar, bass guitar
- Frank Rogers – acoustic piano
- Brian David Willis – drums

Group vocals on "Cluster Pluck"

- James Burton, Vince Gill, John Jorgenson, Albert Lee, Brent Mason, Redd Volkaert and Steve Wariner

== Production ==
- Frank Rogers – producer, overdub recording
- Brian David Willis – associate producer, recording, overdub recording, digital editing
- Jim Catino – A&R direction
- Richard Barrow – recording
- Neal Cappellino – overdub recording
- Justin Niebank – mixing, additional overdub engineer (3)
- Chris O'Donnell – additional overdub engineer (6)
- John Harvey – additional overdub engineer (12)
- Nick Michaud – additional overdub engineer (12)
- Seth Morton – overdub recording assistant
- John Netti – overdub recording assistant
- Mark Petaccia – overdub recording assistant
- Matt Price – overdub recording assistant
- Steve Short – overdub recording assistant, recording assistant
- Greg Lawrence – mix assistant
- Brady Barnett – digital editing
- Tyler Moles – digital editing
- Hank Williams – mastering
- MasterMix (Nashville, Tennessee) – mastering location
- Phillip Stein – production assistant
- Judy Forde-Blair – creative production, album notes
- Brad Paisley – cover design, packaging concept
- Ben Enos – live photography
- Kendall Marcy – playground photography
- Chad Weaver – studio photography
- The Fitzgerald Hartley Co. – management

== Chart performance ==
=== Weekly charts ===
Chart (2008)	Peak position
Canadian Albums (Billboard)	23
US Billboard 200	9
US Top Country Albums (Billboard)	1

=== Year-end charts ===
Chart (2009)	Position
US Top Country Albums (Billboard)	37

=== Singles ===
Year	Single	Peak chart positions		
Year	Single	US Country	US	CAN
2008	"Start a Band" (with Keith Urban)	1	55	51
