= 5th Gear (album) =

Studio album by Brad Paisley
- Released: June 19, 2007
- Recorded: 2006–2007
- Studios: The Castle (Franklin, Tennessee); Sound Kitchen (Franklin, Tennessee); Blackbird (Nashville, Tennessee); East Iris (Nashville, Tennessee)
- Genre: Country
- Length: 67:48
- Label: Arista Nashville
- Producer: Frank Rogers

Brad Paisley chronology
Brad Paisley Christmas (2006)	5th Gear (2007)	Play (2008)

Singles from 5th Gear
- 1. "Ticks" Released: March 12, 2007; 2. "Online" Released: July 2, 2007; 3. "Letter to Me" Released: October 22, 2007; 4. "I'm Still a Guy" Released: March 3, 2008; 5. "Waitin' on a Woman" Released: June 9, 2008

Professional ratings
Review scores
Source	Rating
About.com	4.5/5 stars
AllMusic	4/5 stars
BBC Music	(average)
Christgau's Consumer Guide	(2-star Honorable Mention)
Country Weekly	(favorable)
Entertainment Weekly	B+
The Phoenix	3.5/4 stars
Plugged In (publication)	(unfavorable)
Rolling Stone	3/5 stars
Slant	4.5/5 stars

5th Gear is the sixth studio album by American country music singer Brad Paisley. It was released June 19, 2007, by Arista Nashville and debuted at number three on the Billboard 200, with first week sales of about 197,000 copies. On April 9, 2008, 5th Gear was certified platinum by the RIAA.

The album's first four singles — "Ticks", "Online", "Letter to Me", and "I'm Still a Guy" — all reached Number One on the Billboard Hot Country Songs charts. In June 2008, a re-recording of "Waitin' on a Woman", a song which Paisley originally recorded for his 2005 album Time Well Wasted, was added as a bonus track to this album. This re-edited version was released in June 2008 as the album's fifth single. For the chart week of September 20, 2008, the song has become his twelfth number-one single and his eighth straight number-one hit. When pre-ordered through iTunes, another bonus track, "You Love Me So Good", was included.

In 2009, NPR picked the album as one of "The Decade's 50 Most Important Recordings." "Oh Love" received a Grammy Award for Best Country Collaboration with Vocals nomination.

Blaine Larsen later released a rendition of "It Did" in 2009.

== Track listing ==
No.	Title	Writer(s)	Length
1.	"All I Wanted Was a Car"	Brad Paisley; Chris DuBois; Kelley Lovelace	4:05
2.	"Ticks"	Paisley; Tim Owens; Lovelace	4:33
3.	"Online"	Paisley; DuBois; Lovelace	4:56
4.	"Letter to Me"	Paisley	4:41
5.	"I'm Still a Guy"	Paisley; Lovelace; Lee Thomas Miller	4:11
6.	"Some Mistakes"	Paisley; Owens	4:57
7.	"It Did"	Jim Collins; Marv Green	3:55
8.	"Mr. Policeman"	Paisley; DuBois; Jim Beavers	4:15
9.	"If Love Was a Plane"	Paisley	3:56
10.	"Oh Love" (duet with Carrie Underwood)	Hillary Lindsey; Aimee Mayo; Gordie Sampson	4:11
11.	"Better Than This"	DuBois; David Lee Murphy; Trent Willmon	3:12
12.	"With You, Without You"	Paisley; DuBois; Casey Beathard	4:54
13.	"Previously" (featuring the Kung Pao Buckaroos)		0:55
14.	"Bigger Fish to Fry" (featuring the "New" Kung Pao Buckaroos)	Steve Bogard; Jeff Stevens	4:25
15.	"When We All Get to Heaven"	Eliza Hewitt; Emily Wilson	3:54
16.	"Throttleneck" (instrumental)	Paisley; Frank Rogers; Ben Sesar	5:16
17.	"Outtake 1" (hidden track)		0:26
18.	"Outtake 2" (hidden track)		0:46
19.	"Waitin' on a Woman" (available on later releases only)	Don Sampson; Wynn Varble	5:03
Total length:			67:48

"Mr. Policeman" incorporates the chorus of "In the Jailhouse Now" (written by Jimmie Rodgers) at its end, with new lyrics to fit the rest of the song.

== Personnel ==
Credits from the album's liner notes. There are only limited credits for tracks 17–18 ("Outtake 1" and "Outtake 2"), and the original booklet/liner notes do not include credits for "Waitin' on a Woman" because it was not included on the original release.

- Brad Paisley – lead vocals (1–12, 14–15), electric guitar (1–12, 14, 16), acoustic guitar (1–6, 8–12, 15), voice (17)
- Wes Hightower – backing vocals (1–12, 14–15)
- Vicki Hampton – backing vocals (3)
- Carrie Underwood – backing vocals (3), lead vocals (10)
- Gary Hooker – electric guitar (1, 5–6, 11), baritone guitar (2), 12-string guitar (2)
- Kevin "Swine" Grantt – electric bass (1–12, 14, 16), upright bass (2, 15)
- Kenny Lewis – additional bass guitar (16)
- Gordon Mote – acoustic piano (1, 5, 7–9, 11–12, 14), clavinet (2), keyboards (5), music box (5)
- Tim Lauer – keyboards (3, 10, 16)
- Jim "Moose" Brown – Hammond B-3 organ (3), Wurlitzer organ or Wurlitzer piano (4), acoustic piano (10, 15)
- Ben Sesar – drums (1–12, 14–16)
- Eric Darken – percussion (1–12, 14–16)
- Randle Currie – steel guitar (1–9, 11–12, 14, 16)
- Ron Block – banjo (2, 4)
- Kendall Marcy – banjo (8, 16)
- Bryan Sutton – mandolin (4, 6), banjo (6), acoustic guitar (7, 14)
- Mike Johnson – dobro (6, 10, 15)
- Justin Williamson – fiddle (1, 3–6, 8–9, 11–12, 14, 16), mandolin (2)
- Aubrey Haynie – fiddle (7, 10, 14), mandolin (10, 15)
- Tom Baldrica – tuba (3)
- Little Jimmy Dickens – voice (13, 14, 17, 18)

Brentwood High School Band on "Online"

- Chris Brooks, Jay Dawson, and Kristin Wilkinson – arrangements
- Kristin Wilkinson – coordinator
- Randy Box – conductor
- Chris Brooks – drums
- Jay Dawson – mellophone
- Sam Levine – saxophone
- Roy Agee – trombone
- Mike Haynes – trumpet
- Joe Murphy – tuba

The Kung Pao Buckaroos on track 13 ("Previously") and The New Kung Pao Buckaroos on track 14 ("Bigger Fish to Fry")

- Little Jimmy Dickens (13–14)
- Bill Anderson (13–14)
- George Jones (13)
- Dolly Parton (13)
- Vince Gill (14)

Production and technical staff

- Frank Rogers - producer
- Chris DuBois - executive producer
- Richard Barrow - recording/engineer (basic tracks and overdubs)
- Brian David Willis - recording/engineer (basic tracks and overdubs), digital editing
- Steve Short - assistant engineer (basic tracks and overdubs)
- Neal Cappellino - recording/engineer (overdubs only)
- Jason Lehning - recording/engineer (overdubs only)
- Steve Marcantonio - recording/engineer (overdubs only)
- Mark Petaccia - assistant engineer (overdubs only)
- Seth Morton - assistant engineer (overdubs only)
- Matt Coles - assistant engineer (overdubs only)
- Brady Barnett - digital editing
- Tyler Moles - digital editing
- Justin Niebank - mixing engineer
- Drew Bollman - assistant mixing engineer
- Hank Williams - mastering
- MasterMix (Nashville, Tennessee) – mastering location
- Phillip Stein - "production assistance"
- Astrid May - art direction
- David McClister - photography
- Brad Paisley - cover and packaging design
- Katherine Stratton - design
- Judy Forde-Blair - album liner notes, "creative production"
- Jim Catino - A&R "direction"
- The Castle (Franklin, TN), The Sound Kitchen (Franklin, TN), Blackbird Studios (Nashville, TN) - recording studios
- Blackbird Studios (Nashville, TN), East Iris Studios (Nashville, TN), The Castle (Franklin, TN) - mixing locations/studios

== Chart performance ==
=== Weekly charts ===
Chart (2007)	Peak position
Australian Albums (ARIA)	66
Canadian Albums (Billboard)	5
US Billboard 200	3
US Top Country Albums (Billboard)	1

=== Year-end charts ===
Chart (2007)	Position
US Billboard 200	68
US Top Country Albums (Billboard)	14

Chart (2008)	Position
US Billboard 200	80
US Top Country Albums (Billboard)	17

=== Singles ===
Year	Single	Peak chart positions			
Year	Single	US Country	US	US Pop	CAN
2007	"Ticks"	1	40	48	33
2007	"Online"	1	39	89	50
2007	"Letter to Me"	1	40	81	51
2008	"I'm Still a Guy"	1	33	66	54
2008	"Waitin' on a Woman"	1	44	—	59
"—" denotes releases that did not chart

== Certifications ==
Region	Certification
United States (RIAA)	Platinum
