= Cascades Amphitheater =

Theater in Washington, US

- Interactive map of Cascades Amphitheater
- Former names: The Amphitheater at Clark County (2003–10); Sleep Country Amphitheater (2010–14); Amphitheater Northwest (2015); Sunlight Supply Amphitheater (2015–21); RV Inn Style Resorts Amphitheater(2021–25)
- Address: 17200 NE Delfel Road; Ridgefield, Washington 98642-9480
- Coordinates: 45°44′34″N 122°40′01″W
- Owner: Quincunx of Washington
- Capacity: 18,000
- Type: Amphitheatre

Construction
- Opened: 2003
- Cost: $40 million

Cascades Amphitheater, formerly known as the RV Inn Style Resorts Amphitheater Sleep Country Amphitheater, Amphitheater Northwest, and the Sunlight Supply Amphitheater (originally The Amphitheater at Clark County and commonly Clark County Amphitheater), is an 18,000-seat capacity amphitheater, located in Ridgefield, Washington. It holds 7,810 covered seats and lawn seating for about 10,000.

It is the largest outdoor amphitheater in the Portland metropolitan area. It is used for concerts, stage shows and other special events, including the Clark County Fair. Construction started in 2002, with Sustaita Architects designing the venue and Hoffman Construction Company building it.

== History ==
After its opening in 2003, it operated at a $1 million to $3 million loss through 2008. On July 10, 2009, Coldplay became the first music act to sell out the venue. The Amphitheater at Clark County was renamed Sleep Country Amphitheater in March 2010 after the parent company of Sleep Country USA acquired the naming rights, initially for three years. That contract having expired (and not been renewed), the facility was renamed Amphitheater Northwest in January 2015. This name ended up being temporary, as the venue's owners were reported to be seeking a new sponsor. In October, they did so, and the venue was renamed Sunlight Supply Amphitheater. In August 2021, the venue was renamed after a new sponsor, RV Inn Style Resorts.

It was then renamed Cascades Amphitheater in January 2025.

== Events ==
List of events held at the Amphitheater
Artist	Event	Date	Opening Act(s)		
50 Cent	The Final Lap Tour	September 6, 2023	Busta Rhymes, Jeremih		
311	Summer Unity Tour	September 4, 2012	Slightly Stoopid & SOJA		
Aerosmith	Honkin' on Bobo Tour	May 22, 2004	Cheap Trick		
Alanis Morissette	So-Called Chaos/Au Naturale Tour	July 26, 2004	Barenaked Ladies & Nellie McKay		
Alice in Chains	2007 Tour	September 9, 2007	Velvet Revolver & Sparta		
Backstreet Boys	Never Gone Tour	September 2, 2005	Kaci Brown & Seminole County		
The Black Crowes	2006 Tour	June 11, 2006	Drive-By Truckers & Robert Randolph and the Family Band		
Blondie	Whip It To Shreds Tour	September 8, 2012	Devo		
Brad Paisley & The Drama Kings	Bonfires & Amplifiers Tour	May 25, 2007	Jack Ingram, Kellie Pickler & Taylor Swift		
Brad Paisley & The Drama Kings	H2O Tour	September 10, 2010	Darius Rucker, Justin Moore, Josh Thompson, Easton Corbin & Steel Magnolia		
Brad Paisley & The Drama Kings	World Tour	June 15, 2019	Chris Lane & Riley Green		
Brooks & Dunn	Neon Circus & Wild West Show Tour	September 24, 2004	Montgomery Gentry & Gretchen Wilson		
Brooks & Dunn	Neon Circus & Wild West Show Tour	October 14, 2005	Big & Rich, The Warren Brothers & Cowboy Troy		
Classic Rock Festival		June 27, 2004			
Coldplay	Twisted Logic Tour	August 17, 2005	Black Mountain		
Coldplay	Viva la Vida Tour	July 10, 2009	Kitty, Daisy & Lewis & Amadou & Mariam		
Counting Crows	Hard Candy Tour	July 10, 2003	John Mayer & Maroon 5		
Counting Crows	Saturday Nights & Sunday Mornings Tour	September 20, 2008	Maroon 5 & Augustana		
Country Jamboree		September 15, 2006			
Country Jamboree		September 16, 2006			
Country Jamboree		September 17, 2006			
Crosby, Stills & Nash	2010 Tour	June 11, 2010			
Crosby, Stills, Nash & Young	Freedom of Speech Tour	July 28, 2006			
Crüe Fest 2		July 28, 2009			
Deep Purple	Bananas World Tour	September 9, 2004	Dixie Dregs & Joe Satriani		
Def Leppard	X World Tour	September 26, 2003	Ricky Warwick		
Def Leppard	Rock of Ages Tour	June 1, 2005			
Def Leppard	Downstage Thrust Tour	September 12, 2007	Styx & Foreigner		
Def Leppard	Songs from the Sparkle Lounge Tour	September 11, 2009	Poison & Cheap Trick		
Def Leppard	Mirrorball Tour	September 14, 2011	Heart		
The Doobie Brothers	World Gone Crazy Tour	July 10, 2011	War		
Earth, Wind & Fire	2008 Tour	June 27, 2008			
Fish Fest		September 23, 2005			
Fleetwood Mac	Say You Will Tour	July 5, 2004			
Gigantour		September 11, 2005			
Goo Goo Dolls	20th Anniversary Tour	June 21, 2006	Counting Crows & Augustana		
Heart	Red Velvet Car Tour	September 24, 2010	Night Ranger		
Heart	Heartbreaker Tour	August 30, 2013	Jason Bonham's Led Zeppelin Experience		
Honda Civic Tour	12th Annual Honda Civic Tour	September 27, 2013			
Jack Johnson	2010 World Tour	October 3, 2010	G. Love & Special Sauce & Animal Liberation Orchestra		
Jackson Browne	The Naked Ride Home Tour	July 21, 2003	Steve Earle & Keb' Mo'		
James Taylor	October Road Tour	September 28, 2003			
James Taylor	2005 Tour	August 26, 2005			
James Taylor	2008 Tour	July 24, 2008			
Jason Aldean	Night Train Tour	September 26, 2013	Jake Owen & Thomas Rhett		
Jason Aldean	Back in the Saddle Tour	September 18, 2021	Hardy and Lainey Wilson		
Jessica Simpson	Reality Tour	July 25, 2004	Ryan Cabrera		
Jimmy Buffett & The Coral Reefer Band	Tiki Time Tour	September 18, 2003			
John Mayer & Sheryl Crow	2006 Tour	September 24, 2006	Marjorie Fair		
John Mayer	Continuum Tour	June 1, 2007	Ben Folds & Rocco DeLuca and the Burden		
John Mayer	Born and Raised World Tour	July 19, 2013	Phillip Phillips		
John Mayer Trio	2004 Tour	July 10, 2004	Maroon 5 & DJ Logic		
Josh Groban	Closer Tour	August 27, 2004			
Journey	Classic Rock's Main Event Tour	September 17, 2004	Styx & REO Speedwagon		
Journey	Revelation Tour	September 21, 2008	Cheap Trick & Heart		
Journey & Steve Miller Band	2014 Tour	July 20, 2014	Tower of Power		
Judas Priest	Angel of Retribution Tour	July 4, 2005	Queensrÿche		
Kelly Clarkson & The Fray	2012 Summer Tour	July 21, 2012	Carolina Liar		
Kenny Chesney	Margaritas N' Senorita's Tour	July 26, 2003	Keith Urban & Deana Carter		
Kenny Chesney	The Poets & Pirates Tour	June 3, 2008	LeAnn Rimes		
Kenny Chesney	Goin' Coastal Tour	July 23, 2011	Uncle Kracker & Billy Currington		
Kid Rock	First Kiss Tour	September 4, 2015	Foreigner		
KISS	Rock the Nation Tour	June 22, 2004	Poison & ZO2		
Kiss & Mötley Crüe	The Tour	August 19, 2012	The Treatment		
Kiss & Def Leppard	40th Anniversary Tour/Heroes Tour	June 27, 2014	Kobra and the Lotus		
Lana Del Rey	The Endless Summer Tour	May 22, 2015	Courtney Love		
Lil Wayne & Drake	Lil Wayne Vs. Drake Tour	September 13, 2014			
Lilith Fair		July 2, 2010			
Lynyrd Skynyrd & Bad Company	40th Anniversaries Tour	June 21, 2013	Black Stone Cherry		
The Monkees	45th Anniversary Tour	July 9, 2011			
Mötley Crüe	Carnival of Sins Tour	July 31, 2005	Silvertide & The Exies		
Mötley Crüe	30th Anniversary Tour	August 11, 2011	Poison & New York Dolls		
Mötley Crüe	Farewell Tour	July 26, 2014	Alice Cooper		
Nickelback	The Long Road Tour	September 5, 2004	Puddle of Mudd, 3 Doors Down & 12 Stones		
Nickelback	Dark Horse Tour	August 28, 2009	Hinder, Papa Roach & Saving Abel		
Nine Inch Nails	Live: With Teeth Tour	May 27, 2006	TV on the Radio & Bauhaus		
Nine Inch Nails & Soundgarden	2014 Tour	August 29, 2014	The Dillinger Escape Plan		
No Doubt & Blink-182	2004 Tour	June 17, 2004	Phantom Planet		
OneRepublic	Native Summer Tour	June 10, 2014	The Script & American Authors		
PDX Rock Festival		September 23, 2012			
Pearl Jam	Backspacer Tour	September 26, 2009	Relentless7		
The Police	The Police Reunion Tour	July 11, 2008	Fiction Plane & Elvis Costello and The Imposters		
R.E.M.	2003 Tour	September 3, 2003	Wilco		
Reba McEntire	2 Hats & A Redhead Tour	June 11, 2005	Brad Paisley & Terri Clark		
Ricky Skaggs & Bruce Hornsby	Ricky Skaggs & Bruce Hornsby Tour	June 24, 2007			
Rush	R30: 30th Anniversary Tour	July 3, 2004			
Rush	Snakes & Arrows Tour	July 21, 2007			
Rush	Snakes & Arrows Tour	June 1, 2008			
Rush	Time Machine Tour	June 28, 2011			
Rush	Clockwork Angels Tour	July 28, 2013			
Scorpions	Get Your Sting and Blackout World Tour	August 7, 2010	Ratt & The Blackout		
The Smashing Pumpkins	Zeitgeist Tour	September 21, 2007	Satellite Party		
Steely Dan	The Fab-Originees.com Tour	July 27, 2006	Michael McDonald		
Steve Miller Band	2004 Tour	August 21, 200|align="center"|Sammy Hagar	Best of All Worlds Tour	August 14, 2024	Loverboy
Steve Miller Band	Big Head Todd and the Monsters & Supersuckers				
Let Your Hair Down Tour	July 17, 2011	Eric Johnson			
Tim McGraw	Live Like You Were Dying Tour	July 18, 2004	Big & Rich & The Warren Brothers		
Tim McGraw	Live Your Voice Tour	June 25, 2008	Jason Aldean & Halfway to Hazard		
Tim McGraw	Emotional Traffic Tour	June 17, 2011	Luke Bryan & The Band Perry		
Toby Keith	Hookin' Up & Hangin' Out Tour	July 28, 2007	Miranda Lambert, Flynnville Train & Trailer Choir		
Toby Keith	Biggest & Baddest Tour	July 18, 2008	Montgomery Gentry, Carter's Chord & Mica Roberts		
Toby Keith	American Ride Tour	July 23, 2010	Trace Adkins & James Otto		
Toby Keith	Locked & Loaded Tour	August 19, 2011	Eric Church & JT Hodges		
Tom Petty and the Heartbreakers	30th Anniversary Tour	July 29, 2006	Stevie Nicks & Trey Anastasio Band		
Tori Amos	Summer of Sin Tour	September 9, 2005			
Train	Mermaids of Alcatraz Tour	August 13, 2013	Gavin DeGraw & The Script		
Uprising Festival		May 26, 2007			
Uprising Festival		June 6, 2008			
Uproar Festival		September 23, 2012			
Uproar Festival		September 11, 2013			
Volbeat	Greatest of All Tours	July 22, 2025	Halestorm and The Ghost Inside (band)		
Willie Nelson & Family	Songbird Tour	June 30, 2007			
Willie Nelson & Family	Heroes Tour	September 6, 2012			
Zac Brown Band	Uncaged Tour	September 13, 2013			
Zac Brown Band	Great American Road Trip Tour	September 28, 2014	Ryan Kinder		
Zac Brown Band	Jekyll + Hyde Tour	July 12, 2015	Muddy Magnolias		
ZZ Top	Beer Drinkers and Hell Raisers Tour	September 19, 2003	Ted Nugent		
ZZ Top	Summer Scorcher Tour	August 26, 2007	The Pretenders, Gin Blossoms & Stray Cats		

== See also ==
- List of contemporary amphitheatres
