= Start a Band =

2008 song by Brad Paisley and Keith Urban

Single by Brad Paisley and Keith Urban

from the album Play: The Guitar Album
- Released: September 15, 2008
- Recorded: 2008
- Genre: Country rock
- Length: 5:26 (album version); 3:58 (radio version)
- Label: Arista Nashville
- Songwriters: Dallas Davidson; Ashley Gorley; Kelley Lovelace
- Producer: Frank Rogers

Brad Paisley singles chronology
"Waitin' on a Woman" (2008)	"Start a Band" (2008)	"Then" (2009)

Keith Urban singles chronology
"You Look Good in My Shirt" (2008)	"Start a Band" (2008)	"Sweet Thing" (2008)

"Start a Band" is a song written by Dallas Davidson, Ashley Gorley and Kelley Lovelace. It was recorded as a duet by American country music artist Brad Paisley and Australian country music artist Keith Urban for Paisley's sixth studio album Play: The Guitar Album. Released in September 2008 as the only single from that album, it is also one of only four non-instrumental tracks on the album. It is Paisley's 22nd entry on the Billboard country charts, and Urban's 18th and ranked number one on the US Hot Country Songs charts in 2009.

== Content ==
"Start a Band" is one of only four non-instrumental tracks on Play. Both Paisley and Urban sing and play guitar on the song, which is a moderate up-tempo in which the narrators decide that they will start a band instead of pursuing more academical ventures. In the chorus, they suggest to others who are "living in a world that they don't understand" that they, too, should "find [themselves] a few good buddies and start a band". According to Great American Country, Paisley described the song to The Plain Dealer as "probably not what you think, in the sense that it's not a blazing-fast thing…It's more of a rockin' Eagles-style tune, like back when Joe Walsh and Don Felder would play those harmony parts."

In the album's liner notes, Paisley writes:

"People have been asking for years when Keith and I would do something like this. I am so honored to get to finally pick and sing with one of my favorite players in the world. I am so humbled by his talent."

== Chart performance ==
The song reached number one on the US Hot Country Songs chart week of January 24, 2009, becoming Paisley's thirteenth number one song (and ninth consecutive), as well as Urban's ninth number one. The song was nominated for a Grammy Award for Best Country Collaboration With Vocals at the 52nd Grammy Awards.

== Personnel ==
- Brad Paisley - lead vocals, background vocals, electric guitar, acoustic guitar
- Keith Urban - lead vocals, background vocals, electric guitar
- Randle Currie - steel guitar
- Eric Darken - percussion
- Wes Hightower - background vocals
- Gary Hooker - acoustic guitar
- Kenny Lewis - bass guitar
- Ben Sesar - drums
- Justin Williamson - fiddle

== Charts ==
=== Weekly charts ===
Chart (2008–2009)	Peak Position
Canada Country (Billboard)	1
Canada Hot 100 (Billboard)	51
US Billboard Hot 100	55
US Hot Country Songs (Billboard)	1

=== Year-end charts ===
Chart (2009)	Position
US Hot Country Songs (Billboard)	55
