= Gatlinburg Convention Center =

- Gatlinburg Convention Center in 2026
- Interactive map of Gatlinburg Convention Center
- Address: 234 Historic Nature Trail Gatlinburg, TN 37738.
- Location: Gatlinburg, Tennessee
- Coordinates: 35.709975400°N 83.519461200°W
- Owner: City of Gatlinburg
- Operator: The Gatlinburg Convention and Visitors Bureau

Construction
- Renovated: Recent renovations completed by Johnson & Galyon Construction

Website
- www.gatlinburg.com/meetings-and-conventions/the-convention-center/

The Gatlinburg Convention Center is a convention complex located in Gatlinburg, Tennessee, United States.

The complex was recently renovated by Johnson and Galyon.
