= WE Fest =

Country music festival

- Genre: country
- Dates: first weekend in August
- Locations: Soo Pass Ranch; Detroit Lakes, Minnesota
- Coordinates: 46°46′24″N 95°52′14″W
- Years active: 1983-present
- Founders: Jeff Krueger
- Website: www.wefest.com

WE Fest is a three-day country music festival that has been held each year on the first weekend in August at the Soo Pass Ranch in Detroit Lakes, Minnesota, United States. WE Fest is one of the largest country music festivals by attendance in the United States. In 2016, over 150,000 attended the three day event. The next WE Fest is scheduled for August 1–3, 2024.

Ownership of WE Fest (Matt Mithun and Live Nation), has changed in recent years with updates often posted to the website.

The festival was started by Jeff Krueger in August 1983 and was held on a stage that was down in a horse pasture. The top of the stage was built to look like a barn. there were approximately 9,000 people.

An established venue and festival grounds have been developed and on site camping is often an available option.

The WE Fest logo was created by John Roley in 1982 in Bloomington, Minnesota, at Jeff Krueger's attic apartment on Old Shakopee Road. Jeff wanted to call the Festival The US Fest. That logo was actually Steve Wozniak's Festival in California. By suggestion from Roley, Krueger called the festival WE in '83 Festival, then More in '84 and Alive in '85. This is how the WE Fest became a project.

Alabama was the first band to perform at WE Fest. Since then, other country singers and bands have included Jason Aldean, Big & Rich, Brooks & Dunn, Kenny Chesney, Carrie Underwood, Eric Church, Florida Georgia Line, Rascal Flatts, Vince Gill, Merle Haggard, Faith Hill, Toby Keith, Jerry Lee Lewis, Roger Miller, Martina McBride, Tim McGraw, Nitty Gritty Dirt Band, Charley Pride, and Kane Brown as well as George Strait, Brett Eldredge, Taylor Swift, Blake Shelton, Tanya Tucker, Keith Urban, Tammy Wynette, Brad Paisley, and Trisha Yearwood.

== Lineups By Year ==
2019

August 2019 

- Chris Stapleton
- Keith Urban
- Brooks & Dunn
- Billy Currington
- Jake Owen
- Jamey Johnson
- Big & Rich
- LeAnn Rimes
- LANCO
- Walker Hayes
- Jimmie Allen
- Dylan Scott
- Tyler Rich
- Adam Doleac
- Kelleigh Bannen
2018

August 2018

- Jason Aldean
- Carrie Underwood
- Josh Turner
- Chris Janson
- Tyler Farr
- Carly Pearce
- Devin Dawson
- Vince Gill
- Justin Moore
- Ashley McBryde
- The Cadillac Three
2017

August 2017

- Luke Bryan
- Lady Antebellum
- Zac Brown Band
- Darius Rucker
- Brett Eldredge
- Randy Houser
- Kelsea Ballerini
- Kane Brown
- Brett Young
- Cody Johnson
2016

August 2016

- Tim McGraw
- Eric Church
- Kid Rock
- Gary Allan
- Lee Brice
- Montgomery Gentry
- Granger Smith,
- LOCASH
- William Michael Morgan
- Hardwood Groove
2015

August 2015

- Blake Shelton
- Miranda Lambert
- Logan Mize
- Big & Rich
- Rascal Flatts
- Randy Rodgers Band
- Eric Paslay
- Tyler Farr–—
- Swon Brothers
- Colt Ford
- Eli Young Band
1983

August 1983

- Alabama
- Tom T. Hall
- Merle Haggard
- Jerry Lee Lewis
- Sons Of The Pioneers
- Freddy Fender
- Tammy Wynette
- The Brower Brothers
- Lynn Anderson
- The Bellamy Brothers

== See also ==
- List of country music festivals
- Country music
