= Ticks (song) =

Single by Brad Paisley

from the album 5th Gear
- Released: March 12, 2007
- Recorded: 2007
- Genre: Country
- Length: 4:33 (Album Version); 3:58 (Single Version)
- Label: Arista Nashville
- Songwriters: Brad Paisley; Kelley Lovelace; Tim Owens
- Producer: Frank Rogers

Brad Paisley singles chronology
"She's Everything" (2006)	"Ticks" (2007)	"Online" (2007)

"Ticks" is a song co-written and recorded by American country music artist Brad Paisley. It was released in March 2007 as the first single from his 2007 album 5th Gear. The song reached number one on the US Billboard Hot Country Songs chart. Paisley wrote this song with Kelley Lovelace and Tim Owens.

This song was featured as a downloadable track for the video game Guitar Hero: World Tour.

== Content ==
The song's main character is at a bar, attempting to pick up a date. In doing so, he uses several humorous pickup lines, such as "I'd like to check you for ticks."

Paisley stated that the song is not about blood-sucking arachnids but rather about a guy flirting with a gal. Paisley was inspired to write the song from experience working on a farm. “Working out here on the farm, I literally have to check for ticks every time I come in from the woods or the fields,” he notes. “Now, if a young guy who lives in the country were to take a girl into the woods for any reason, it would totally cross his mind that she’s going to have to check for ticks when they come back out. So it seems that an enterprising guy would at least consider that he could offer to check for her.”

== Critical reception ==
Kevin John Coyne of Country Universe gave the song a C− grade. While saying that the production was good, he went on to say "[the song] may be the very first mainstream country single to completely skeeze [him] out."

== Personnel ==
- Ron Block - banjo
- Randle Currie - steel guitar
- Eric Darken - percussion
- Kevin "Swine" Grantt - bass guitar, upright bass
- Wes Hightower - background vocals
- Gary Hokker - baritone guitar, 12 string guitar
- Gordon Mote - clavinet
- Brad Paisley - lead vocals, electric guitar, acoustic guitar, Tic tac bass
- Ben Sesar - drums
- Justin Williamson - mandolin

== Chart performance ==
=== Weekly charts ===
Chart (2007)	Peak position
Canada Country (Billboard)	1
Canada Hot 100 (Billboard)	33
US Billboard Hot 100	40
US Hot Country Songs (Billboard)	1

=== Year-end charts ===
Chart (2007)	Position
US Country Songs (Billboard)	20

== Certifications ==
Region	Certification	Certified units/sales
Canada (Music Canada)	Gold	40,000^{‡}
United States (RIAA)	Platinum	1,000,000^{‡}
^{‡} Sales+streaming figures based on certification alone.
