= Greeley Stampede =

Premier annual summer festival held in Greeley, Colorado

Greeley Independence Stampede
- Worlds Largest 4th Of July Celebration
- Location: Greeley Stampede (Island Grove Regional Park) 600 North 14th Avenue; Greeley, CO 80631, United States

The Greeley Stampede, also known as the Greeley Independence Stampede, is an annual celebration held in Greeley, Colorado. It spans two weekends in July and features Professional Rodeo Cowboys Association (PRCA)-sanctioned rodeo, bull riding and kids' rodeos, country and classic rock concerts, demolition derby, a televised 4th of July parade, Carnival Midway, Western Art Show, free stage entertainment, and loads of festival grounds activities, mixed with food and fun. The ProRodeo Hall of Fame inducted the Greeley Stampede in 2014.

== History ==
The Greeley Stampede is rich in tradition and heritage dating back to the late 1800s. By 1920, the Stampede was the largest fair or festival in the world. This community celebration that was started to honor local potato farmers, has since grown into an internationally acclaimed festival attracting close to 450,000 people annually from all parts of the United States and several foreign countries, including Canada, Mexico, and England. The Greeley Stampede is the 2nd largest fair in Colorado, and features one of the largest rodeos in the world.

Officially christened the Greeley Spud Rodeo in 1922, the event featured bucking bronc riding, fancy roping, a pie eating contest, a horse race, motorcycle and bicycle races and a two-mile Model-T Ford "free for all" race. Estimated attendance in that first official festival was 2,500 people.

In an effort to give the event some national recognition the Greeley Spud Rodeo era ended and, thus began the age of the "Go West with Greeley" Rodeo. The name taken from the famous phrase by the city's name sake, Horace Greeley, who said "Go west young man. Go west."

The Greeley Independence Stampede entitlement came in 1972 by means of a community contest and featured: Pro Rodeos; kids' rodeo; country and classic rock concerts; a televised July 4 parade, a demolition derby, carnival midway, western art show, free stage entertainment, mixed with food and fun.

The stampede went on hiatus in 1917–18 and 1942–45 due to World Wars I and II, and in 2020 due to the COVID-19 pandemic.

== Controversy ==
In 2003, the Stampede Committee announced that the event would adopt the name Rocky Mountain Stampede. Stampede Committee Chairman Lew Hagenlock explained, "The event has grown to a point where it is recognized as a regional and national event... we felt it should be named accordingly. We're excited to begin a new era in the event's history." Many within the community; however, saw this as an advance move aimed at moving the event to the recently completed Larimer County Fairgrounds and Events Complex, also known as The Ranch in Loveland, Colorado. Due to the resulting public outcry, the Stampede Committee ultimately decided to change the name to Greeley Stampede in 2005.
