= I'm Still a Guy =

Single by Brad Paisley

from the album 5th Gear
- Released: March 3, 2008
- Genre: Country
- Length: 4:11 (album version); 3:55 (radio version)
- Label: Arista Nashville
- Songwriters: Brad Paisley; Kelley Lovelace; Lee Thomas Miller
- Producer: Frank Rogers

Brad Paisley singles chronology
"Letter to Me" (2007)	"I'm Still a Guy" (2008)	"Waitin' on a Woman" (2008)

"I'm Still a Guy" is a song co-written and recorded by American country music singer Brad Paisley. It was released in March 2008 as the fourth single from his album 5th Gear. As with the other three singles from that album, "I'm Still a Guy" reached number one on the Billboard Hot Country Songs chart.

== Content ==
"I'm Still a Guy" is a mid-tempo set in triple meter, written by Paisley along with Kelley Lovelace and Lee Thomas Miller. In the song, the narrator explains to his female companion that he is "still a guy" despite his companion's attempts to correct his stereotypical behavior and society's attempts to apply feminine traits to men.

Paisley said that his intention was to "capture this struggle a little bit between men and women in a playful way".

Initially, Paisley was not certain if a female audience would accept the song, so he sang it to his wife, Kimberly Williams-Paisley - who was pregnant at the time - straight after writing it at his co-writer and friend, Kelley Lovelace's, house. According to Miller, she "laughed long and hard at all the right places". Just hours later, while back at Lovelace's house, he found out his wife's water had broken - Lovelace's words to him as he ran out of the door were "Don't forget the last song you wrote before you became a father!"

== Critical reception ==
Kevin John Coyne, reviewing the song for Country Universe, gave it a B− rating. Coyne says that while the song would be great to create energy at a concert, it "lacks the strength to be a viable radio single. Instead, it sounds more like a ditty rather than a substantive song."

== Personnel ==
- Randle Currie - steel guitar
- Eric Darken - percussion
- Kevin "Swine" Grantt - bass guitar
- Wes Hightower - background vocals
- Gary Hooker - electric guitar
- Gordon Mote - piano, music box
- Brad Paisley - lead vocals, electric guitar, acoustic guitar
- Ben Sesar - drums
- Justin Williamson - fiddle

== Chart performance ==
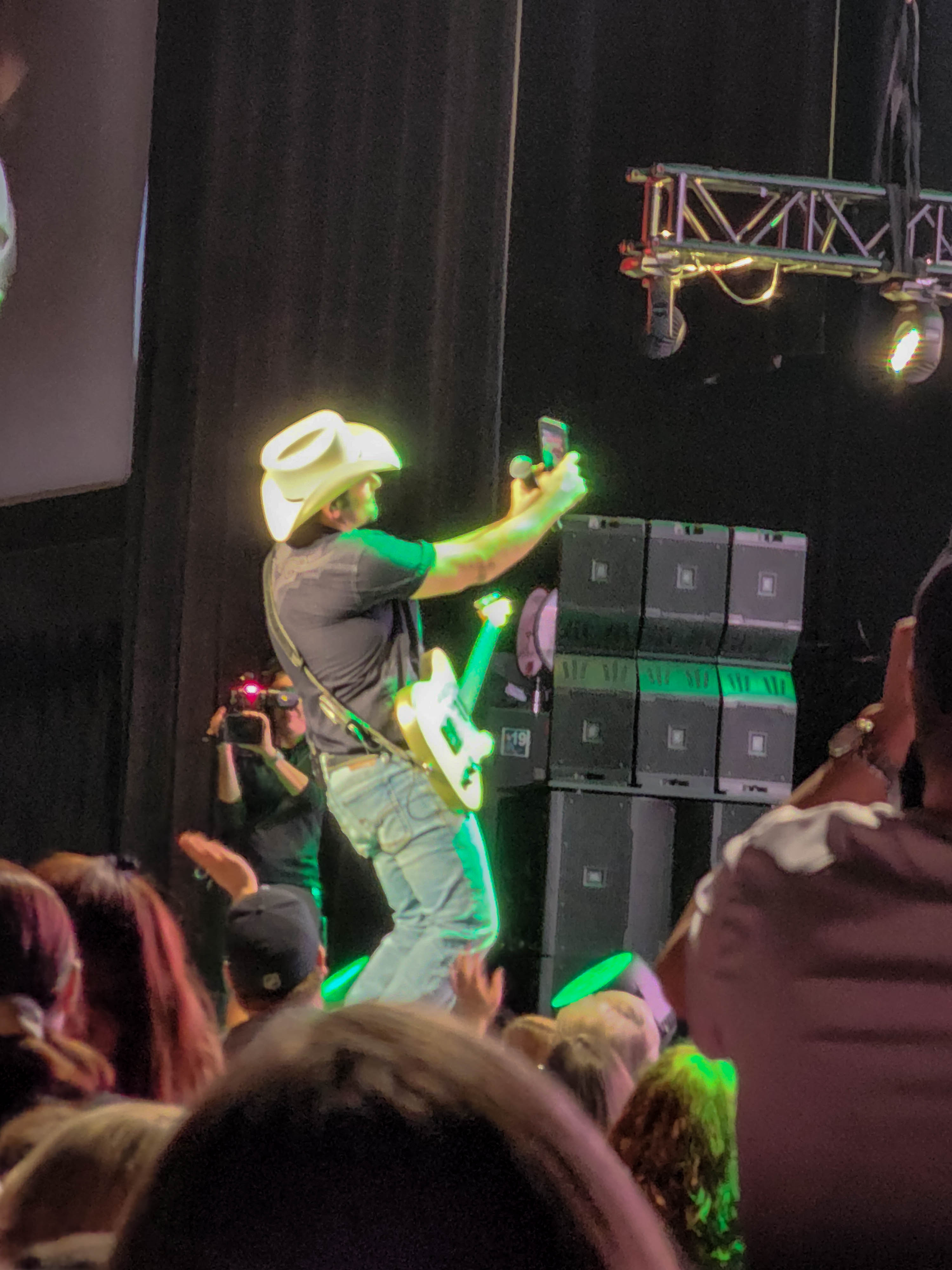
Paisley taking a selfie during a performance of "I'm Still a Guy", May 2022

The song debuted at number 48 on the Hot Country Songs chart dated March 8, 2008, moving up to number 28 the next week. It climbed to Number One on the country chart dated May 31, 2008, and stayed there for three weeks, giving Paisley his seventh consecutive Number One single and eleventh overall.

Chart (2008)	Peak Position
Canada Country (Billboard)	1
Canada Hot 100 (Billboard)	54
US Billboard Hot 100	33
US Hot Country Songs (Billboard)	1

=== Year-end charts ===
Chart (2008)	Position
Canada Country (Billboard)	4
US Country Songs (Billboard)	10

== Certifications ==
Region	Certification	Certified units/sales
Canada (Music Canada)	Gold	40,000^{‡}
United States (RIAA)	Platinum	1,000,000^{‡}
^{‡} Sales+streaming figures based on certification alone.
