= Kelley Lovelace =

American songwriter

- Birth name: John Kelley Lovelace
- Born: Paducah, Kentucky, U.S.
- Origin: Nashville, Tennessee, U.S.
- Genres: Country
- Occupation: Songwriter
- Years active: 1999–present

John Kelley Lovelace is an American songwriter known mainly for his work with country artist Brad Paisley. He has written several of Paisley's singles, including the number 1 hits "He Didn't Have to Be" (Paisley's first number 1), "The World", "Ticks", "Online", "I'm Still a Guy", "Start a Band", "Water", and "Remind Me". He has also written Top 10 singles for Joe Nichols, Jason Aldean, Terri Clark, and Carrie Underwood. In 2010, he received an ASCAP award for "Water".

Lovelace is an alumnus of Hixson High School in Chattanooga, Tennessee and Belmont University in Nashville. Lovelace also played football for Hixson High.
