= Letter to Me =

"Letter To Me"

Single by Brad Paisley

from the album 5th Gear
- Released: October 22, 2007
- Recorded: 2007
- Genre: Country
- Length: 4:41 (album version); 4:24 (single version)
- Label: Arista Nashville
- Songwriter: Brad Paisley
- Producer: Frank Rogers

Brad Paisley singles chronology
"Online" (2007)	"Letter To Me" (2007)	"I'm Still a Guy" (2008)

"Letter To Me" is a song written and recorded by American country music singer Brad Paisley. It was released in October 2007 as the third single from his album 5th Gear. The song spent four weeks at Number One on the Billboard Hot Country Songs charts in February 2008, becoming his sixth consecutive Number One on that chart, as well as his tenth overall.

== Inspiration ==
Paisley was inspired to write "Letter to Me" after his wife, Kimberly Williams-Paisley, was asked in 2007 to write for a book entitled What I Know Now: Letters to My Younger Self. Upon hearing of the book, he thought that the concept of writing a letter to his younger self would be a good idea for a country song. According to him, it took most of a week to write the song, as he would constantly change the lyrics and write a new letter every month.

== Content ==
In "Letter to Me," the song's narrator is an adult who is reflecting on his youth. Now older and wiser for having lived various teen-aged experiences, the narrator uses experiences he had as a teenager to give his more youthful self advice on dealing with various situations.

Among the experiences are: dealing with the trauma of breaking up with a steady girlfriend after several months, breaking the habit of reckless driving and missing a much-anticipated homecoming bonfire rally to improve a failing algebra grade. The adult also guides his teen-aged self through dealing with older and wiser people, such as his family and teachers.

Other situations are more light-hearted, such as a first-date experience with the right girl. After a teaser about how good his wife and children look, the narrator gives his teen-aged self some final words about how the best years of his life lie ahead and that he now regrets he did not study Spanish and typing, finally noting, "I wish you wouldn't worry, let it be."

The song references many aspects of Paisley's childhood such as the corner of "Tomlinson and Eighth," two streets in his hometown of Glen Dale, West Virginia. Mrs. Brinkman, whose name is mentioned in the song, was a teacher at John Marshall High School in Glen Dale until her retirement in 2007.

At the 51st Grammy Awards, Paisley won Best Male Country Vocal Performance for "Letter to Me."

== Critical reception ==
Kevin John Coyne of Country Universe gave the song a A− grade. Coyne says that it is "appropriate that in a letter to himself at a younger age where he reveals how much greatness he has ahead of him, Paisley proves his adult self is telling the truth about all of his personal strengths."

== Music video ==
The music video, directed by Jim Shea, was shot at his high school, John Marshall, in Glen Dale, W.V. The video is used as a homecoming and features many of his former classmates and teachers. In the end after the song is done, there is a short outro of footage of Paisley being given a crown during a school assembly in 1991. This scene was not home footage. It was shot in present day, with an actor playing a younger Paisley. Paisley has called this video, "The most personal video I've ever done." He also says that this, as well as his 2008 “Waitin’ on a Woman” video, are his favorite videos of his own.

== Personnel ==
- Ron Block - banjo
- Jim "Moose" Brown - Wurlitzer organ
- Randle Currie - steel guitar
- Eric Darken - percussion
- Kevin "Swine" Grantt - bass guitar
- Wes Hightower - background vocals
- Brad Paisley - lead vocals, electric guitar, acoustic guitar, Tic tac bass
- Ben Sesar - drums
- Bryan Sutton - mandolin
- Justin Williamson - fiddle

== Chart performance ==
Chart (2007–2008)	Peak position
Canada Country (Billboard)	1
Canada Hot 100 (Billboard)	58
US Billboard Hot 100	40
US Hot Country Songs (Billboard)	1

=== Year-end charts ===
Chart (2008)	Position
Canada Country (Billboard)	11
US Country Songs (Billboard)	25

=== Sales and certifications ===
Country	Provider	Certification	Sales
United States	RIAA	Gold	500,000+
