= Waitin' on a Woman =

Single by Brad Paisley

from the album 5th Gear
- Released: June 23, 2008
- Genre: Country
- Length: 4:32 (Time Well Wasted); 5:03 (5th Gear)
- Label: Arista Nashville
- Songwriters: Don Sampson; Wynn Varble
- Producer: Frank Rogers

Brad Paisley singles chronology
"I'm Still a Guy" (2008)	"Waitin' on a Woman" (2008)	"Start a Band" (2008)

Music video
- "Waitin' on a Woman" on YouTube

"Waitin' on a Woman" is a song written by Don Sampson and Wynn Varble, and recorded three times by American country music artist Brad Paisley. His first recording of the song was included on his 2005 album Time Well Wasted. Three years later, Paisley re-recorded the song as the fifth and final single on June 23, 2008 from his 2007 album 5th Gear. This became the twenty-first chart single of Paisley's career and became the twelfth number 1 single of his career and his eighth consecutive number 1 single. The song also appeared on Play with a guest vocal from Andy Griffith.

== Content ==
The song is a mid-tempo composed of three verses. Its central character is a recently married male sitting on a bench at a shopping mall, waiting for his wife to finish shopping. He meets an older man (Andy Griffith) who, like him, is "waitin' on a woman". The older man explains over the next two verses that, although he has often had to wait for his wife, he does not mind doing so ("I don't guess we've been anywhere / She hasn't made us late, I swear / Sometimes she does it just 'cause she can do it"). He tells the younger man that he will often find himself "waitin' on a woman" as well. In the third verse, the older male observes that he will most likely die before his wife does ("I've read somewhere statistics show / The man's always the first to go"). After making this realization, he finally states that he will wait for his wife in Heaven (should he die first), because he, too, "[doesn't] mind waitin' on a woman". In the end, the old man is seen sitting on a white bench, wearing a white suit, on a lone beach, waiting for his wife to join him.

== History ==
According to Country Weekly magazine, songwriter Wynn Varble received a call from his friend telling him that their former co-worker was in the hospital. Varble wrote the song after calling his co-worker at the hospital, wondering where his wife was. He told "the story and the idea [he] had for [the song]" to co-writer Don Sampson. After a few days, Varble and Sampson played "Waitin' on a Woman" for Paisley, and he decided to record it.

== Critical reception ==
The song received a "thumbs up" review from the country music review site Engine 145. Reviewer Matt C. stated that the central character (i.e., Paisley's character in the song) "offer[s] abundant examples of a woman's imperfections while portraying himself as the guy who tolerates it all out of the goodness of his heart…look[ing] like a good guy without degrading his female companion". He considered it a superior counterpart to Paisley's late 2003-early 2004 single "Little Moments" (in which the lead character lists off various mistakes his wife has made before admitting that he "live[s] for little moments like that"), but, unlike with "Little Moments", the reviewer thought that the gender observations in "Waitin' on a Woman" were "delicately appropriate rather than insensitively obtuse". Leeann Ward, reviewing the song for Country Universe, gave it a B rating. Ward said that while the song with its "sluggish melody, is built on the stereotype that a woman is always late, there is a sweetness about the sentiment’s presentation that rescues it."

== Music video ==
Paisley has referred to "Waitin' on a Woman" as "one of the most important songs" that he's ever recorded. Because of the importance that he places on the song, Paisley asked Andy Griffith to star in the music video, as he felt that Griffith's personality matched the personality of the older man in the song. Griffith speaks the old man's lines in the video as well. Jim Shea directed the music video for "Waitin' On A Woman". Peter Tilden produced the video, and the premiere of the video was on CMT and GAC on June 30, 2008.

In August 2008, the song's video mix, complete with Griffith's vocals, was sent to radio as well. This mix is also included on Paisley's 2008 album Play. The video was shot in Nags Head, North Carolina at milepost 16's Tanger Outlets.

== Parody ==
In 2009, parodist and comedian Cledus T. Judd released a parody of the song titled "Waitin' on Obama", referencing Barack Obama's election as President of the United States.

== Chart performance ==
"Waitin' on a Woman" debuted at number 51 on the Billboard Hot Country Songs chart dated for the week of 28 June 2008. For the chart week of 20 September 2008, it has become Paisley's twelfth Number One single overall.

Chart (2008)	Peak position
Canada Country (Billboard)	1
Canada Hot 100 (Billboard)	59
US Billboard Hot 100	44
US Hot Country Songs (Billboard)	1

=== Year-end charts ===
Chart (2008)	Position
US Country Songs (Billboard)	19
