= Online (Brad Paisley song) =

Single by Brad Paisley

from the album 5th Gear
- Released: July 2, 2007
- Genre: Country
- Length: 4:56 (album version); 3:50 (single version)
- Label: Arista Nashville
- Songwriters: Chris DuBois; Kelley Lovelace; Brad Paisley
- Producer: Frank Rogers

Brad Paisley singles chronology
"Ticks" (2007)	"Online" (2007)	"Letter to Me" (2007)

Music video
- "Online" on YouTube

"Online" is a song by American country music artist Brad Paisley. It was released to country radio stations on July 2, 2007, as the second single from the album 5th Gear. "Online" reached the #1 spot on the Billboard Country charts on October 13, 2007. It was certified Gold by the RIAA on February 4, 2010. On November 7, 2007, Brad Paisley's single "Online" won Paisley an award for Male Vocalist of the Year, and Music Video of the Year at the 41st Annual Country Music Association Awards. The awards were held at the Sommet Center in Nashville and were broadcast on ABC. Paisley wrote this song with Kelley Lovelace and Chris DuBois.

== Content ==
"Online" is a moderate up-tempo song whose lyrics satirize the online world, specifically MySpace. Here, the song's protagonist is a geek who lives at home with his parents, holds a job at the local Pizza Pitt pizzeria, and claims limited success in the dating world. Actually "five-foot-three and overweight," a fan of science fiction, and a mild asthmatic, the main character has an account on MySpace. There, he assumes a much more desirable yet fictitious personality: "Online, I'm out in Hollywood / I'm six-foot-five and I look damn good / I drive a Maserati / I'm a black-belt in karate / And I love a good glass of wine". Later in the song, he claims to live in Malibu, California, have a sexy, finely sculptured body, and model for Calvin Klein Inc. and GQ. His sex life amounts to being able to have a "three way chat with two women at one time", an example of double entendre. All this makes the geek claim that he is "so much cooler online." The album version of the song ends with a marching band playing the melody of the chorus, a reference to an earlier line where the protagonist claims to play tuba in a marching band.

== Critical reception ==
Kevin J. Coyne of Country Universe gave the song an F rating. He considered the song a form of bullying because of the contrast between Paisley's superstar status and the unpopularity of the character in the song. Coyne added, "[W]hat Brad is doing here isn’t comedy. It’s sport." Allmusic critic Stephen Thomas Erlewine described the song more favorably in his review of 5th Gear, saying, "[It's] an obvious joke that comes just a bit too close to bullying, but he saves himself with his smarts — not just verbal[…] but musical, as he ends it with a marching band that delivers an aural punchline set up by the words."

== Music video ==
The music video for “Online” was filmed on May 26, 2007. It premiered on CMT on June 28, 2007. The video was directed by actor Jason Alexander and produced by Mark Kalbfeld. Alexander played the geek in the video, with Estelle Harris and William Shatner playing the geek’s parents. Patrick Warburton plays the car dealer, Shane West plays the photographer, and Maureen McCormick of The Brady Bunch fame appearing as the geek’s next-door neighbor. At the end of the video, the Brentwood High School marching band appears, and they also perform the chorus at the end of the album version of the song. Kellie Pickler and Taylor Swift appear as backup dancers for Paisley (and Alexander dressed as Paisley).

The video begins with a snippet of Brad Paisley's previous single "Ticks." Then, there's a scene of the geek in disguise who works at a place called Pizza Pitt. He was a pizza delivery person shown delivering a pizza. Once the geek leaves, a QuickTime logo shows up on a computer. Then, Paisley enters to start the song. The video also features a geek at his computer working on Brad Paisley's MySpace profile. There are also shots of Paisley at his computer, clips from Paisley’s music video for his 2003 single "Celebrity," a geek in sci-fi attire, looking at a high school yearbook, and scenes of the geek outside with his next-door neighbor. We also see the band performing, the Digital Rain, and the parents arguing in the background, all from Brad Paisley’s show at the White River Amphitheatre in Auburn, Washington. Swift and Pickler were the opening acts for this tour.

During the instrumental break, the geek's parents get into an argument over the father creating a MySpace online profile for himself. The mother becoming infatuated with Paisley after seeing him performing the song. "And he can sing!", she says to the father. "I can't sing?" the father inquires. "No!" she snaps back. In response, the husband looks sad, a reference to Shatner's musical career. As the song continues, the geek comes out on stage, lip-syncing Paisley's vocals. Paisley returns to the stage after the geek is finished. When the geek's father asks the geek "What the hell are you doing?", the geek's next-door neighbor in the window gets the geek's attention. He gets out his marching band outfit. The geek disguises as a member of the marching band alongside his neighbor. It's at this point that the geek's mother tells Paisley, "Marching music makes me...hot." That's when Paisley stares at the camera in horror. The 41st Annual CMA Awards were televised by ABC on November 7, 2007, from the Bridgestone Arena (formerly Sommet Center) in Nashville, Tennessee. During the telecast, Brad Paisley won Male Vocalist of the Year and Music Video of the Year for "Online."

== Personnel ==
As listed in liner notes.

- Brad Paisley - lead vocals, electric guitar, acoustic guitar
- Tom Baldrica - tuba
- Jim "Moose" Brown - B3 organ
- Randle Currie - steel guitar
- Eric Darken - percussion
- Kevin "Swine" Grantt - bass guitar
- Vicki Hampton - background vocals
- Wes Hightower - background vocals
- Tim Lauer - keyboards
- Ben Sesar - drums
- Carrie Underwood – background vocals
- Justin Williamson - fiddle
- Brentwood High School Marching Band, Randy Box, conductor
- Roy Agee - trombone
- Chris Brooks - drums
- Jay Dawson - mellophone
- Mike Haynes - trumpet
- Sam Levine - saxophone
- Joe Murphy - tuba

== Chart performance ==
Chart (2007)	Peak position
Canada Country (Billboard)	1
Canada Hot 100 (Billboard)	50
US Billboard Hot 100	39
US Hot Country Songs (Billboard)	1

=== Year-end charts ===
Chart (2007)	Position
US Country Songs (Billboard)	32

== Certifications ==
Country	Certification (sales thresholds)
United States	Gold
