= FivePoint Amphitheatre =

Former concert venue in Irvine, California

- Interactive map of FivePoint Amphitheatre
- Location: 14800 Chinon; Irvine, California, U.S.
- Coordinates: 33°39′28″N 117°43′47″W
- Owner: FivePoint Holdings, LLC
- Operator: Live Nation
- Seating type: Reserved seating, standing room
- Capacity: 12,280
- Type: Amphitheatre

Construction
- Opened: October 5, 2017
- Closed: October 21, 2023

FivePoint Amphitheatre was an amphitheatre at the Orange County Great Park in Irvine, California. It opened in 2017 as a replacement for the defunct Irvine Meadows Amphitheatre. With 6,500 bleacher seats, 280 VIP seats, and an approximate 5,500 standing room spaces, it was the largest amphitheatre in Orange County by overall capacity and second-largest in seated capacity, only behind the Pacific Amphitheatre in Costa Mesa. The site is owned by real estate development group FivePoint and was operated by Los Angeles–based concert promoter Live Nation. The facility consisted of three temporary bleacher sections and a temporary stage with future plans to establish a more permanent amphitheatre on the Great Park premises.

From its opening in October 2017, FivePoint Amphitheatre served as one of Orange County's major outdoor concert venues with many musicians, bands, and performers making tour stops there.

On October 21, 2023, the FivePoint Amphitheatre permanently closed after six years of operation.

== History ==
The current site of the Orange County Great Park originated as Marine Corps Air Station (MCAS) El Toro, a military air base that operated from 1942 to 1999. In 2016, the Irvine Company decided not to renew Live Nation's lease at the Irvine Meadows Amphitheatre, meaning that the 35-year-old venue would permanently close and face demolition to make way for housing developments. In early 2017, Live Nation partnered with Great Park developer FivePoint to establish a temporary venue on its property by the end of the year. A site was selected for development near the end of the former MCAS El Toro runway 34L. On March 14, the Irvine city council unanimously approved the project. The amphitheatre was originally scheduled to open on August 26 with local bands Young the Giant and Cold War Kids, but the inaugural concert was postponed to October 5. The concert went on as planned on October 5, officially opening the venue.

On October 21, 2023, Live Nation announced the FivePoint Amphitheatre would permanently close after the Zac Brown Band event of the same night. The promoter has hoped after the closure of the amphitheatre they would develop and construct a new permanent concert amphitheatre consisting of 14,000 seating within the center of the Great Park area. The city of Irvine ended its partnership with Live Nation to rule out any future development and negotiations in July 2023, citing the proposed size of the venue, noise, and safety concerns. The area of the former amphitheatre will become residential development.

On June 14, 2024, the city of Irvine has opened another temporary amphitheater, Great Park Live, while the city constructs a larger, permanent amphitheater slated to be open in 2027.
