= Brad Paisley discography =

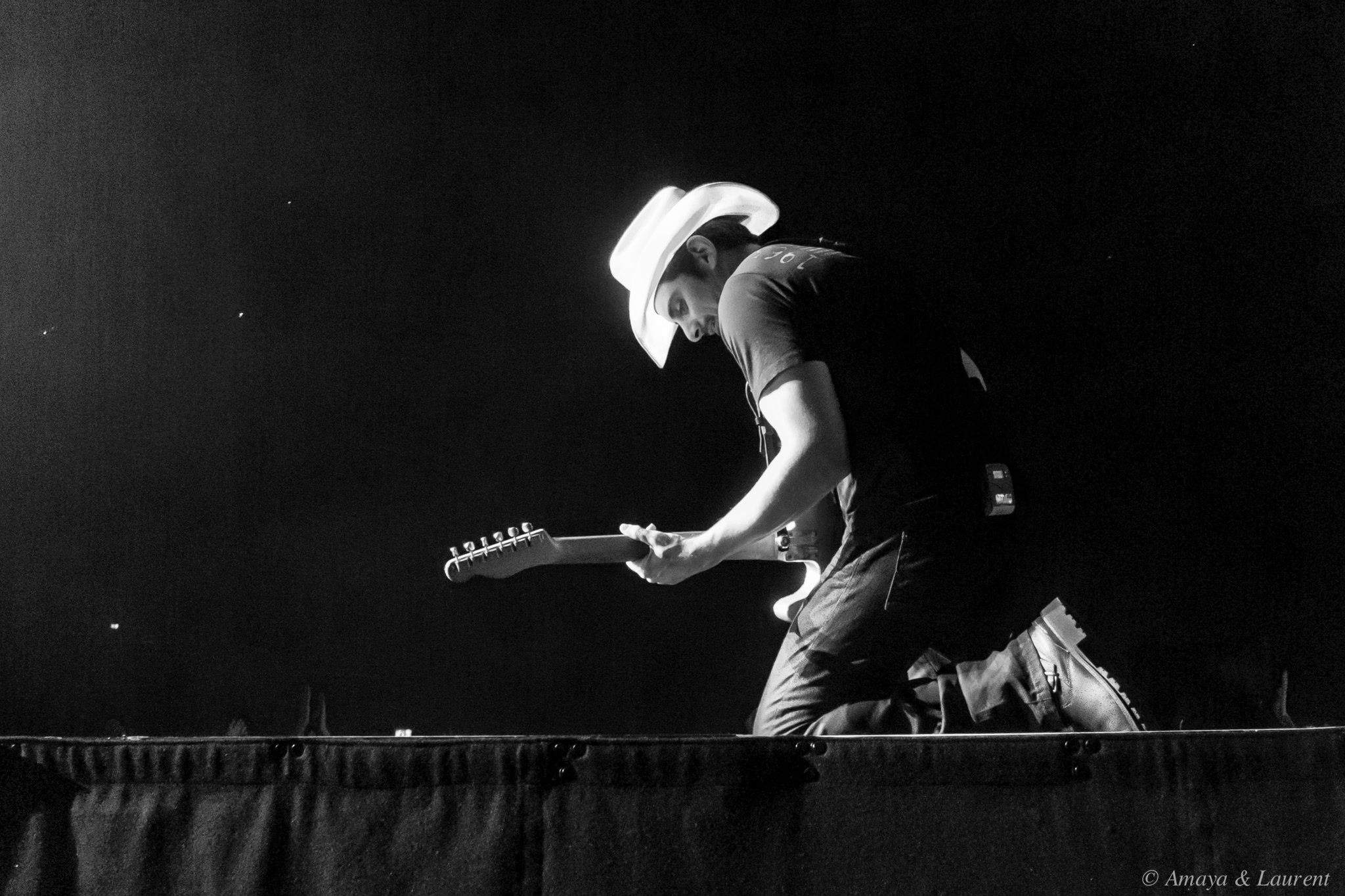
- Brad Paisley in Oslo, Norway, 2014
- Studio albums: 14
- Compilation albums: 3
- Singles: 52
- Music videos: 45
- Other charted songs: 10
- Collaborations: 5
- #1 Singles: 21

American musician Brad Paisley has released 14 studio albums, 52 singles, three compilation albums, and a number of collaborations. He made his chart debut in 1999 with "Who Needs Pictures", which reached number 12 on the Billboard Hot Country Songs charts. That same year, he charted with "He Didn't Have to Be", the first of 21 singles in his career to reach the number-one position on that chart counting collaborations. This figure includes a run of ten consecutive number-one singles between 2006 and 2009, starting with the Dolly Parton duet "When I Get Where I'm Going" and ending with "Then".

Paisley recorded for Arista Nashville from 1999 until the label's closure in 2023. During his tenure with this label he released all twelve of his studio albums, starting with Who Needs Pictures. His most commercially successful albums are Mud on the Tires (2003) and Time Well Wasted (2005), both certified double-platinum by the Recording Industry Association of America (RIAA).

== Studio albums ==
=== 1990s and 2000s ===
Title	Album details	Peak chart positions					Certifications (sales threshold)
Title	Album details	US	US Country	AUS	CAN	UK Country	Certifications (sales threshold)
Who Needs Pictures (Note: Who Needs Pictures also peaked at number 1 on the Billboard Top Heatseekers chart and number 12 on the RPM Country Albums chart.)	Release date: June 1, 1999; Label: Arista Nashville; Formats: CD, cassette	102	13	—	—	—	CAN: Gold; US: Platinum
Part II	Release date: May 29, 2001; Label: Arista Nashville; Formats: CD, cassette	31	3	—	—	—	CAN: Gold; US: Platinum
Mud on the Tires	Release date: July 22, 2003; Label: Arista Nashville; Formats: CD, download	8	1	—	—	—	US: 2× Platinum
Time Well Wasted	Release date: August 16, 2005; Label: Arista Nashville; Formats: CD, download	2	1	82	—	—	CAN: Gold; US: 2× Platinum
Brad Paisley Christmas	Release date: October 10, 2006; Label: Arista Nashville; Formats: CD, download	47	8	—	—	—	
5th Gear	Release date: June 19, 2007; Label: Arista Nashville; Formats: CD, download	3	1	66	5	—	US: Platinum
Play: The Guitar Album	Release date: November 4, 2008; Label: Arista Nashville; Formats: CD, download	9	1	—	23	—	
American Saturday Night	Release date: June 30, 2009; Label: Arista Nashville; Formats: CD, download	2	1	67	4	4	CAN: Gold; US: Gold
"—" denotes releases that did not chart.

=== 2010s–present ===
Title	Album details	Peak chart positions										Certifications (sales threshold)	Sales
Title	Album details	US	US Country	AUS	AUS Country	CAN	NOR	SWE	SWI	UK	UK Country	Certifications (sales threshold)	Sales
This Is Country Music	Release date: May 23, 2011; Label: Arista Nashville; Formats: CD, download	2	1	26	2	3	3	42	45	86	2	US: Gold	US: 561,000
Wheelhouse	Release date: April 9, 2013; Label: Arista Nashville; Formats: CD, download	2	1	27	—	2	23	38	71	69	10		US: 207,000
Moonshine in the Trunk	Release date: August 26, 2014; Label: Arista Nashville; Formats: CD, download	2	1	14	4	2	13	—	49	34	1		US: 187,400; UK: 2,387
Love and War	Release date: April 21, 2017; Label: Arista Nashville; Formats: CD, download, streaming	13	1	22	1	11	24	—	26	33	1		US: 71,200
Snow Globe Town	Release date: November 7, 2025; Label: Mercury Nashville; Formats: CD, download, streaming	—	49	—	—	—	—	—	—	—	—		
Tacklebox (Disc 1)	Release date: July 17, 2026; Label: Mercury Nashville; Formats: Download, streaming	—	—	—	—	—	—	—	—	—	—		
"—" denotes releases that did not chart.

== Compilation albums ==
Title	Album details	Peak chart positions				Certifications (sales threshold)	Sales
Title	Album details	US	US Country	CAN	NOR	Certifications (sales threshold)	Sales
Playlist: The Very Best of Brad Paisley	Release date: March 31, 2009; Label: Arista Nashville; Formats: CD, download	—	57	—	—		
Hits Alive	Release date: November 2, 2010; Label: Arista Nashville; Formats: CD, download	9	4	24	—	US: Gold	US: 235,000
Norwegian Favorites	Release date: November 30, 2010; Label: Sony Import; Formats: CD, download	—	—	—	5		
"—" denotes releases that did not chart.

== Singles ==
=== 1990s and 2000s ===
Year	Title	Peak chart positions				Certifications (sales threshold)	Album
Year	Title	US	US Country Songs	CAN	CAN Country	Certifications (sales threshold)	Album
1999	"Who Needs Pictures"	65	12	—	11		Who Needs Pictures
1999	"He Didn't Have to Be"	30	1	—	6		Who Needs Pictures
2000	"Me Neither"	85	18	—	21		Who Needs Pictures
2000	"We Danced"	29	1	—	12		Who Needs Pictures
2001	"Two People Fell in Love"	51	4	—	x		Part II
2001	"Wrapped Around"	35	2	—	x		Part II
2002	"I'm Gonna Miss Her (The Fishin' Song)"	29	1	—	x	RIAA: Gold; MC: Gold	Part II
2002	"I Wish You'd Stay"	57	7	—	x		Part II
2003	"Celebrity"	31	3	—	x		Mud on the Tires
2003	"Little Moments"	35	2	—	x		Mud on the Tires
2004	"Whiskey Lullaby" (with Alison Krauss)	41	3	—	x	RIAA: 2× Platinum; BPI: Silver; MC: Platinum; RMNZ: Platinum	Mud on the Tires
2004	"Mud on the Tires"	30	1	—	1	RIAA: Platinum; MC: Platinum	Mud on the Tires
2005	"Alcohol"	28	4	—	6	RIAA: Gold; MC: Gold	Time Well Wasted
2005	"When I Get Where I'm Going" (with Dolly Parton)	39	1	—	2	RIAA: Platinum; MC: Platinum	Time Well Wasted
2006	"The World"	45	1	—	1		Time Well Wasted
2006	"She's Everything"	35	1	—	1	RIAA: 2× Platinum; MC: Gold	Time Well Wasted
2007	"Ticks"	40	1	33	1	RIAA: Platinum; MC: Gold	5th Gear
2007	"Online"	39	1	50	1	RIAA: Gold	5th Gear
2007	"Letter to Me"	40	1	51	1	RIAA: Gold	5th Gear
2008	"I'm Still a Guy"	33	1	54	1	RIAA: Platinum; MC: Gold	5th Gear
2008	"Waitin' on a Woman" (Note: "Waitin' on a Woman" was originally included on Time Well Wasted. The single version, which is a re-recording, was added to later releases of 5th Gear.)	44	1	59	1	RIAA: Gold	5th Gear
2008	"Start a Band" (with Keith Urban)	55	1	51	1		Play: The Guitar Album
2009	"Then" (Note: "Then" peaked at number 19 on the Billboard Adult Contemporary chart.)	28	1	52	1	RIAA: 2× Platinum; MC: Platinum	American Saturday Night
2009	"Welcome to the Future"	42	2	60	1		American Saturday Night
2009	"American Saturday Night"	67	2	66	1		American Saturday Night
"—" denotes releases that did not chart "x" denotes that no chart existed or was archived

=== 2010s–present ===
Year	Title	Peak chart positions						Certifications (sales threshold)	Sales	Album
Year	Title	US	US Country Songs	US Country Airplay	CAN	CAN Country	UK	Certifications (sales threshold)	Sales	Album
2010	"Water"	42	1		54	1	—	RIAA: Gold; MC: Gold		American Saturday Night
2010	"Anything Like Me"	48	1		66	1	—			Hits Alive
2010	"This Is Country Music"	58	2		67	1	—		US: 370,000	This Is Country Music
2011	"Old Alabama" (with Alabama)	38	1		41	1	—	RIAA: Platinum		This Is Country Music
2011	"Remind Me" (with Carrie Underwood)	17	1		33	1	—	RIAA: 2× Platinum	US: 2,152,000	This Is Country Music
2011	"Camouflage"	87	15		—	11	—			This Is Country Music
2012	"Southern Comfort Zone"	54	10	2	58	2	—			Wheelhouse
2013	"Beat This Summer"	46	9	2	51	3	—	RIAA: Gold	US: 532,000	Wheelhouse
2013	"I Can't Change the World"	— (Note: "I Can't Change the World" did not enter the Billboard Hot 100, but peaked at number 22 on the Bubbling Under Hot 100 Singles chart.)	33	22	—	43	—			Wheelhouse
2013	"The Mona Lisa"	— (Note: "The Mona Lisa" did not enter the Billboard Hot 100, but peaked at number 5 on the Bubbling Under Hot 100 Singles chart.)	24	19	—	38	100			Wheelhouse
2014	"River Bank"	54	12	2	37	2	—	RIAA: Gold	US: 473,000	Moonshine in the Trunk
2014	"Perfect Storm"	52	4	1	76	1	—	RIAA: Gold	US: 357,000	Moonshine in the Trunk
2015	"Crushin' It"	66	15	9	71	6	—		US: 232,000	Moonshine in the Trunk
2015	"Country Nation"	94	18	12	—	30	—		US: 20,000	Moonshine in the Trunk
2016	"Without a Fight" (featuring Demi Lovato)	— (Note: "Without a Fight" did not enter the Billboard Hot 100, but peaked at number 5 on the Bubbling Under Hot 100 Singles chart.)	23	16	—	14	—			Non-album single
2016	"Today"	67	7	3	100	31	—	MC: Gold	US: 151,000	Love and War
2017	"Last Time for Everything"	— (Note: "Last Time for Everything" did not enter the Billboard Hot 100, but peaked at number 20 on the Bubbling Under Hot 100 Singles chart.)	26	19	—	—	—			Love and War
2017	"Heaven South"	—	47	48	—	—	—			Love and War
2018	"Bucked Off"	—	—	24	—	—	—			Non-album singles
2019	"My Miracle"	—	—	42	—	—	—			Non-album singles
2020	"No I in Beer"	—	29	22	—	24	—			Non-album singles
2021	"City of Music"	—	—	—	—	—	—			Non-album singles
2023	"Same Here" (featuring President Volodymyr Zelenskyy)	—	—	—	—	—	—			Son of the Mountains (unreleased)
2023	"So Many Summers"	—	—	—	—	—	—			Son of the Mountains (unreleased)
2023	"The Medicine Will"/"Son of the Mountains" (Note: "The Medicine Will" and "Son of the Mountains" are a double A-side.)	—	—	—	—	—	—			Son of the Mountains (unreleased)
2024	"Truck Still Works"	—	—	29	—	—	—			Non-album single
"—" denotes releases that did not chart.

=== Promotional singles ===
Year	Title	Album
2019	"Alive Right Now" (featuring Addie Pratt)	Non-album singles
2021	"Off Road"	Non-album singles

=== As a featured artist ===
Year	Title	Artist	Peak chart positions							Certifications (sales threshold)	Album
Year	Title	Artist	US	US Country Airplay	US Country Songs	AUS	SCO	CAN	CAN Country	Certifications (sales threshold)	Album
2011	"Everything and All"	Randy Travis	—	—	—	—	—	—	—		Anniversary Celebration
2016	"Forever Country"	Artists of Then, Now & Forever	21	33	1	26	29	25	45	US: Gold	—N/a
2021	"Santa Don't Come Here Anymore"	Rob Thomas	—	—	—	—	—	—	—		Something About Christmas Time
2021	"Freedom Was a Highway"	Jimmie Allen	45	1	5	—	—	—	21	RIAA: Platinum	Bettie James
"—" denotes releases that did not chart.

== Other charted songs ==
Year	Title	Peak chart positions				Album
Year	Title	US	US Country Airplay	US Country Songs	CAN Country	Album
2000	"Hard to Be a Husband, Hard to Be a Wife" (with Chely Wright)	—	68		—	Grand Ole Opry 75th Anniversary, Vol. 2
2001	"Too Country" (with Bill Anderson, George Jones, and Buck Owens)	—	58		—	Part II
2006	"Born on Christmas Day"	—	41		—	Brad Paisley Christmas
2006	"Santa Looked a Lot Like Daddy"	—	49		—	Brad Paisley Christmas
2006	"Penguin, James Penguin"	—	55		—	Brad Paisley Christmas
2007	"Winter Wonderland"	—	58		—	Brad Paisley Christmas
2007	"Kung Pao Buckaroo Holiday" (with Bill Anderson, Little Jimmy Dickens, and George Jones)	—	59		—	Brad Paisley Christmas
2013	"Accidental Racist" (with LL Cool J)	77	—	23	—	Wheelhouse
2014	"Shattered Glass"	—	—	44	—	Moonshine in the Trunk
2024	"Goes Without Saying" (Post Malone featuring Brad Paisley)	60	—	25	—	F-1 Trillion
2025	"Leave the Christmas Lights On for Me"	—	—	—	50	Snow Globe Town
"—" denotes releases that did not chart.

== Music videos ==
Year	Title	Director
1999	"Who Needs Pictures"	Jim Shea
1999	"He Didn't Have to Be"	Deaton Flanigen
2000	"Me Neither"	Jim Shea
2001	"Two People Fell in Love"	Deaton Flanigen
2001	"Wrapped Around"	Brad Paisley
2002	"I'm Gonna Miss Her (The Fishin' Song)"	Peter Zavadil
2002	"Sharp Dressed Man"	Brent Hedgecock
2002	"I Wish You'd Stay"	Brad Paisley
2003	"Celebrity"	Peter Zavadil
2004	"Little Moments"	Jim Shea/Peter Tilden
2004	"Whiskey Lullaby"	Ricky Schroder
2004	"Mud on the Tires"	Thom Oliphant/Brad Paisley
2005	"Alcohol"	Jim Shea
2005	"When I Get Where I'm Going"	Jim Shea
2006	"The World"	Scott Scovill
2006	"She's Everything"	Scott Scovill
2007	"Online"	Jason Alexander
2007	"Letter to Me"	Jim Shea
2008	"I'm Still a Guy" (with Hank Williams Jr.) (from 2008 CMT Music Awards)	Alan Carter
2008	"Waitin' on a Woman" (with Andy Griffith)	Jim Shea/Peter Tilden
2008	"Start a Band" (with Keith Urban)	Jim Shea
2009	"Then" (from 2009 CMT Music Awards)	Alan Carter
2009	"American Saturday Night" (from CMT Invitation Only)	Alan Carter
2009	"Welcome to the Future"	Jim Shea
2009	"American Saturday Night"	Scott Scovill/Craig Countryman
2010	"Water"	Jim Shea
2010	"Alcohol" (live)	Scott Scovill
2010	"This Is Country Music" (from 2010 CMA Awards)	Paul Miller
2011	"Old Alabama" (with Alabama)	Jim Shea
2011	"Remind Me" (with Carrie Underwood)	Deaton Flanigen
2012	"Southern Comfort Zone"	Jim Shea
2013	"Beat This Summer"	Roman White
2014	"River Bank"	Scott Scovill
2014	"Perfect Storm"	Jim Shea
2015	"Crushin' It"	Brad Paisley
2015	"Country Nation"	Jeff Venable
2016	"Without a Fight" (featuring Demi Lovato)	Jeff Venable
2016	"Forever Country" (Artists of Then, Now & Forever)	Joseph Kahn
2016	"Today"	Jim Shea/Brad Paisley
2017	"Last Time for Everything"	Jeff Venable
2017	"Heaven South"	Jeff Venable
2018	"Bucked Off (Rodeo Edition)"	
2019	"My Miracle"	
2023	"Son of the Mountains"	
2023	"The Medicine Will"	

== Miscellaneous appearances ==
Year	Title	Album
2000	"More Beaver" (with Cledus T. Judd)	Just Another Day in Parodies
2000	"Hard to Be a Husband, Hard to Be a Wife" (with Chely Wright)	Grand Ole Opry 75th Anniversary, Vol. 2
2001	"Sugarfoot Rag" (with Asleep at the Wheel)	The Very Best of Asleep at the Wheel Since 1970
2002	"Sharp Dressed Man"	Sharp Dressed Men: A Tribute to ZZ Top
2003	"Luxury Liner" (instrumental, with Albert Lee and Vince Gill)	Heartbreak Hill
2003	"Something About Her" (Performed Live at Ryan Sutter and Trista Rehn's Wedding)	iTunes download
2004	"New Again" (with Sara Evans)	The Passion of the Christ: Songs
2004	"College" (with Pat Green)	Lucky Ones
2004	"Real" (with William Shatner)	Has Been
2005	"Blame Me" (with Craig Morgan and John Conlee)	My Kind of Livin'
2006	"In Times Like These"	She Was Country When Country Wasn't Cool
2006	"Behind the Clouds"	Cars (soundtrack)
2006	"Find Yourself"	Cars (soundtrack)
2007	"Keep on the Sunny Side"	Anchored in Love: A Tribute to June Carter Cash
2007	"Jammin' for Stevie" (instrumental, with Charlie Daniels)	Deuces
2007	"Winter Wonderland"	Hear Something Country: Christmas 2007
2008	"The Old Rugged Cross"	How Great Thou Art: Gospel Favorites from the Grand Ole Opry
2008	"Something in the Water" (with Little Feat and Bob Seger)	Join the Band
2008	"Hang Around" (with Monty Lane Allen)	Great Big World
2008	"What a Friend We Have in Jesus"	Billy: The Early Years
2010	"If You Can't Make Money" (with Bill Anderson)	Songwriter
2010	"I Don't Care" (with Darius Rucker)	Charleston, SC 1966
2011	"Everything and All" (with Randy Travis)	25th Anniversary Celebration
2011	"Collision of Worlds" (with Robbie Williams)	Cars 2 (soundtrack)
2011	"Nobody's Fool"	Cars 2 (soundtrack)
2011	"They Can't Take That Away From Me" (with Tony Bennett)	Duets II
2011	"Space Cowboy" (with William Shatner and Steve Miller)	Seeking Major Tom
2012	"Cupid's Got a Shotgun" (with Carrie Underwood)	Blown Away
2012	"I'm Gonna Get Drunk and Play Hank Williams" (with Hank Williams, Jr.)	Old School New Rules
2012	"Merry Christmas, Baby" (with Colbie Caillat)	Christmas in the Sand
2013	"Live For You" (with LL Cool J)	Authentic
2013	"Hot Rod Heart" (with John Fogerty)	Wrote a Song for Everyone
2014	"All In"	Planes: Fire and Rescue (soundtrack)
2014	"Runway Romance"	Planes: Fire and Rescue (soundtrack)
2014	"Rockin' Down the Highway" (with The Doobie Brothers)	Southbound
2016	"Born to Boogie" (with Hank Williams, Jr., Justin Moore and Brantley Gilbert)	It's About Time
2016	"I...Like You" (with Bobby Bones and the Raging Idiots)	The Critics Give It 5 Stars
2017	"Truckaroo"	Cars 3 (soundtrack)
2017	"Thunder Hollow Breakdown"	Cars 3 (soundtrack)
2018	"Dang Me"	King of the Road: A Tribute to Roger Miller
2024	"Goes Without Saying" (Post Malone featuring Brad Paisley)	F-1 Trillion
2025	"Things We Quit" (Kane Brown featuring Brad Paisley)	The High Road
