= Hits Alive =

Compilation album / Live Album by Brad Paisley
- Released: November 2, 2010
- Genre: Country
- Length: 114:01
- Label: Arista Nashville
- Producer: Frank Rogers

Brad Paisley chronology
American Saturday Night (2009)	Hits Alive (2010)	This Is Country Music (2011)

Singles from Hits Alive
- 1. "Anything Like Me" Released: August 16, 2010

Professional ratings
Review scores
Source	Rating
AllMusic	4/5 stars

Hits Alive is the first compilation album by American country music artist Brad Paisley. This album contains two CDs of a collection of Paisley's greatest hits spanning his entire career. The first disc contains studio versions, and the second disc contains live versions. It was released on November 2, 2010, on Arista Nashville. It sold 31,000 copies in its first week. As of the chart dated April 16, 2011, the album has sold 235,881 copies in the US.

== Content ==
The album contains both studio versions as well as live versions of Paisley's greatest hits. Disc one contains studio versions of fourteen of his songs, including a special piano mix of "Then." Disc two contains live versions of eleven of his songs recorded while Paisley was on The H2O Tour 2010.

The only single from Hits Alive is "Anything Like Me," which first appeared on his 2009 album American Saturday Night. The song debuted on country radio on August 16, 2010.

== Track listing ==
Disc 1
No.	Title	Writer(s)	Album	Length
1.	"Mud on the Tires"	Brad Paisley, Chris DuBois	Mud on the Tires	3:28
2.	"Ticks"	Paisley, Tim Owens, Kelley Lovelace	5th Gear	4:33
3.	"Anything Like Me"	DuBois, Paisley, Dave Turnbull	American Saturday Night	4:29
4.	"The World"	Paisley, Lovelace, Lee Thomas Miller	Time Well Wasted	4:01
5.	"Little Moments"	Paisley, DuBois	Mud on the Tires	3:39
6.	"When I Get Where I'm Going" (featuring Dolly Parton)	Rivers Rutherford, George Teren	Time Well Wasted	4:08
7.	"Celebrity"	Paisley	Mud on the Tires	3:43
8.	"Then" (Piano Mix)	Paisley, DuBois, Ashley Gorley	American Saturday Night	4:22
9.	"I'm Still a Guy"	Paisley, Lovelace, Miller	5th Gear	4:11
10.	"He Didn't Have to Be"	Paisley, Lovelace	Who Needs Pictures	4:42
11.	"Alcohol"	Paisley	Time Well Wasted	4:52
12.	"Whiskey Lullaby" (featuring Alison Krauss)	Bill Anderson, Jon Randall	Mud on the Tires	4:19
13.	"We Danced"	Paisley, DuBois	Who Needs Pictures	3:45
14.	"Online" (w/Live Outro)	Paisley, DuBois, Lovelace	5th Gear	4:50

Disc 2
No.	Title	Writer(s)	Length
1.	"Water" (Live)	Paisley, DuBois, Lovelace	4:58
2.	"American Saturday Night" (Live)	Paisley, Lovelace, Gorley	4:40
3.	"Waitin' on a Woman" (Live)	Don Sampson, Wynn Varble	5:38
4.	"I'm Gonna Miss Her" (Live)	Paisley, Frank Rogers	3:48
5.	"Mud on the Tires" (Live)	Paisley, DuBois	4:24
6.	"She's Everything" (Live)	Paisley, Wil Nance	6:51
7.	"Time Warp" (Live, Instrumental)	Paisley, Rogers	4:38
8.	"Letter to Me" (Live)	Paisley	6:31
9.	"Then" (Live)	Paisley, DuBois, Gorley	6:22
10.	"Alcohol" (Live featuring Darius Rucker)	Paisley	6:25
11.	"Online" (Reprise)	Paisley, DuBois, Lovelace	0:51

== Personnel ==
- Tom Baldrica – tuba on "Online"
- Eddie Bayers – drums
- Ron Block – banjo
- Brentwood High School Marching Band – marching band on "Online"
- Jim "Moose" Brown – clavinet, Hammond B-3 organ, piano
- Randle Currie – steel guitar
- Eric Darken – percussion
- Jerry Douglas – dobro
- Glen Duncan – fiddle
- Kevin "Swine" Grantt – bass guitar, upright bass
- James Gregory – bass guitar
- Scott Hamilton and the 12 Steps – background vocals on "Alcohol"
- Vicki Hampton – background vocals
- Jody Harris – electric guitar, background vocals
- Bernie Herms – piano
- Wes Hightower – background vocals
- Gary Hooker – 12-string acoustic guitar, acoustic guitar, baritone guitar, electric guitar, background vocals
- Mike Johnson – dobro, steel guitar
- Alison Krauss – viola and vocals on "Whiskey Lullaby"
- Tim Lauer – keyboards
- Kenny Lewis – bass guitar, background vocals
- Mitch McMitchen – percussion
- Kendall Marcy – banjo, Hammond B-3 organ, keyboards, piano, background vocals
- Gordon Mote – clavinet, Hammond B-3 organ, keyboards, piano, music box on "I'm Still a Guy"
- Brad Paisley – 12-string acoustic guitar, 12-string electric guitar, acoustic guitar, baritone guitar, electric guitar, mandolin, Tic tac bass, lead vocals
- Huck Paisley – vocals on "Anything Like Me"
- Dolly Parton – vocals on "When I Get Where I'm Going"
- Darius Rucker – vocals on "Alcohol (Live)"
- Ben Sesar – drums
- Bryan Sutton – mandolin
- Dan Tyminski – background vocals on "Whiskey Lullaby"
- Kris Wilkinson – viola
- Justin Williamson – fiddle, mandolin, background vocals

== Charts and certifications ==
=== Weekly charts ===
Chart (2010)	Peak position
Canadian Albums (Billboard)	24
US Billboard 200	9
US Top Country Albums (Billboard)	4

=== Singles ===
Year	Single	Peak chart positions		
Year	Single	US Country	US	CAN
2010	"Anything Like Me"	1	48	66

=== Year-end charts ===
Chart (2011)	Position
US Billboard 200	150
US Top Country Albums (Billboard)	27
Chart (2019)	Position
US Top Country Albums (Billboard)	95
Chart (2020)	Position
US Top Country Albums (Billboard)	71

=== Certifications ===
Region	Certification	Certified units/sales
Canada (Music Canada)	Gold	40,000^{‡}
United States (RIAA)	Gold	500,000^{^}
^{^} Shipments figures based on certification alone.^{‡} Sales+streaming figures based on certification alone.
