= Playlist: The Very Best of Brad Paisley =

Greatest hits album by Brad Paisley
- Released: March 31, 2009
- Recorded: 1999–2008
- Genre: Country
- Length: 55:16
- Label: Legacy, Arista Nashville
- Producer: Frank Rogers

Brad Paisley chronology
Play (2008)	Playlist: The Very Best of Brad Paisley (2009)	American Saturday Night (2009)

Professional ratings
Review scores
Source	Rating
Allmusic	3/5 stars
Country Weekly	3.5/5 stars

Playlist: The Very Best of Brad Paisley is a compilation album by Brad Paisley that was released on March 31, 2009. It is part of a series of similar Playlist albums issued by Legacy Recordings. The album features six of Paisley's singles from his first two albums only.

== Content ==
There are five rare tracks on this compilation album. "New Again" is a duet with Sara Evans featured on an album called Passion of the Christ: Original Songs Inspired by the Film. "Ode De Toilet (The Toilet Song)" was available as one of several bonus tracks on a limited edition of Time Well Wasted available only at Target stores and as a B-side of the "Online" ringle. "Keep on the Sunny Side" is a June Carter Cash cover from the album Anchored in Love: A Tribute to June Carter Cash. "Sharp Dressed Man" is a ZZ Top cover from the album Sharp Dressed Men: A Tribute to ZZ Top. "Chicken Chet" is a previously unreleased instrumental track from the sessions from Play.

== Critical reception ==
Playlist: The Very Best of Brad Paisley received three stars out of five from Al Campbell of Allmusic. Campbell wrote that the album "focuses on several of the singer's chart entries recorded between 1999 and 2002," lamenting that singles such as "I'm Gonna Miss Her (The Fishin' Song)" and "I Wish You'd Stay" were omitted. An uncredited review from Country Weekly gave the album three and a half stars out of five. The author wrote that "hiding in this unassuming package alongside a handful of actual hits […] are genuine treats for die-hard Paisley partiers."

== Track listing ==
No.	Title	Writer(s)	Length
1.	"Me Neither"	Brad Paisley, Chris DuBois, Frank Rogers	3:21
2.	"Wrapped Around"	Paisley, DuBois, Kelley Lovelace	3:25
3.	"New Again" (featuring Sara Evans)	Paisley, Sara Evans	6:24
4.	"Sharp Dressed Man"	Billy Gibbons, Dusty Hill, Frank Beard	3:47
5.	"The Cigar Song"	Paisley	3:39
6.	"He Didn't Have to Be"	Paisley, Lovelace	4:44
7.	"Chicken Chet" (instrumental)	Paisley, Rogers	2:36
8.	"Ode De Toilet (The Toilet Song)"	Paisley, Gerry House	4:42
9.	"Two Feet of Topsoil"	Paisley, Robert Arthur	2:47
10.	"Who Needs Pictures"	Paisley, DuBois, Rogers	3:47
11.	"Two People Fell in Love"	Paisley, Lovelace, Tim Owens	4:08
12.	"Keep On the Sunny Side"	Ada Blenkhorn, J. Howard Entwisle	4:04
13.	"We Danced"	Paisley, DuBois	3:47
14.	"Time Warp" (instrumental)	Paisley, Rogers	3:56
Total length:			55:16

== Chart performance ==
Playlist: The Very Best of Brad Paisley peaked at number 57 on the U.S. Billboard Top Country Albums chart the week of April 25, 2009.

Chart (2009)	Peak position
U.S. Billboard Top Country Albums	57
