= 36th Academy of Country Music Awards =

2001 American country music awards

- Date: May 9, 2001
- Location: Universal Amphitheatre, Los Angeles, California
- Hosted by: LeAnn Rimes

Highlights
- Most wins: Dixie Chicks; Lee Ann Womack; Sons of the Desert (3 each)
- Most nominations: Toby Keith; Lee Ann Womack (6 each)

Television/radio coverage
- Network: CBS

The 36th Academy of Country Music Awards was held on May 9, 2001, at the Universal Amphitheatre, in Los Angeles, California. The ceremony was hosted by LeAnn Rimes.

== Winners and nominees ==
Winners are shown in bold.

Entertainer of the Year	Album of the Year
**Dixie Chicks**; Brooks & Dunn; Faith Hill; Toby Keith; George Strait	**How Do You Like Me Now?! — Toby Keith**; American III: Solitary Man — Johnny Cash; I Hope You Dance — Lee Ann Womack; One Voice — Billy Gilman; Who Needs Pictures — Brad Paisley
Top Female Vocalist of the Year	Top Male Vocalist of the Year
**Faith Hill**; Sara Evans; Martina McBride; Jo Dee Messina; Lee Ann Womack	**Toby Keith**; Kenny Chesney; Tim McGraw; Brad Paisley; George Strait
Top Vocal Group of the Year	Top Vocal Duo of the Year
**Dixie Chicks**; Alabama; Diamond Rio; Lonestar; Sawyer Brown	**Brooks & Dunn**; The Judds; The Kinleys; Montgomery Gentry; The Warren Brothers
Single Record of the Year	Song of the Year
**"I Hope You Dance"** — **Lee Ann Womack (feat. Sons of the Desert)**; "How Do You Like Me Now?!" — Toby Keith; "Kiss This" — Aaron Tippin; "The Little Girl" — John Michael Montgomery; "There Is No Arizona" — Jamie O'Neal	**"I Hope You Dance"** — **Mark D. Sanders and Tia Sillers**; "How Do You Like Me Now?!" — Toby Keith and Chuck Cannon; "The Little Girl" — Harley Allen; "One Voice" — Don Cook and David Malloy; "We Danced" — Brad Paisley and Chris DuBois
Top New Male Vocalist	Top New Female Vocalist
**Keith Urban**; Billy Gilman; Phil Vassar	**Jamie O'Neal**; Tammy Cochran; Carolyn Dawn Johnson
Top New Vocal Duo or Group	Video of the Year
**Rascal Flatts**; Clark Family Experience; Sons of the Desert	**"Goodbye Earl"** — **Dixie Chicks**; "I Hope You Dance" — Lee Ann Womack; "The Way You Love Me" — Faith Hill; "When It All Goes South" — Alabama; "You Shouldn't Kiss Me Like This" — Toby Keith
Vocal Event of the Year
**"I Hope You Dance"** — **Lee Ann Womack and Sons of the Desert**; "Buy Me a Rose" — Alison Krauss, Billy Dean and Kenny Rogers; "Let's Make Love" — Faith Hill and Tim McGraw; "Murder on Music Row" — George Strait and Alan Jackson; "That's the Beat of a Heart" — Sara Evans and The Warren Brothers
Career Achievement Award
**Kenny Rogers**
Pioneer Award
**Barbara Mandrell**

== Performers ==
Performer(s)	Song(s)
Toby Keith	"I'm Just Talkin' About Tonight"
LeAnn Rimes	"What's Goin' On with LeAnn"
Billy Gilman	"She's My Girl"
Brooks & Dunn	"Ain't Nothing 'bout You"
Jessica Andrews	"Who I Am"
Alan Jackson	"Where I Come From"
Kenny Rogers	"There You Go Again"
Jo Dee Messina	"Downtime"
Montgomery Gentry	"She Couldn't Change Me"
Kenny Chesney	"Don't Happen Twice"
Dwight Yoakam	"I Want You to Want Me"
Lonestar	"I'm Already There"
Brad Paisley	"Two People Fell in Love"
Terri Clark; Ronnie Milsap; Patty Loveless; Louise Mandrell	"She Was Country When Country Wasn't Cool"
Lee Ann Womack	"Why They Call It Falling"
The Warren Brothers; Sara Evans	"That's the Beat of a Heart"
LeAnn Rimes	"Can't Fight the Moonlight"
Diamond Rio	"One More Day"
SHeDAISY	"Still Holding Out for You"
LeAnn Rimes	"Over the Rainbow"

== Presenters ==
Presenter(s)	Notes
Trace Adkins; Nancy O'Dell	Top Vocal Group of the Year
Tracy Byrd; Mark Chesnutt	Song of the Year
Mark Wills; Jessica Andrews	Top New Female Vocalist
Glen Campbell	Presents Career Achievement Award to Kenny Rogers
Ty Herndon; Alecia Davis; Jeff Ross	Video of the Year
John Michael Montgomery; Jane Clayson Johnson	Vocal Event of the Year
Chely Wright; Mark Miller	Top Vocal Duo of the Year
Gary Allan; Lari White	Top New Vocal Duo or Group of the Year
Terri Clark; Ronnie Milsap; Patty Loveless; Louise Mandrell	Presents Pioneer Award to Barbara Mandrell
Bryan White; Erika Page White	Top New Male Vocalist
Collin Raye; Leeza Gibbons; Tina Wesson	Single Record of the Year
Aaron Tippin; The Kinleys	Album of the Year
Buck Owens; Martie Maguire	Top Female Vocalist of the Year
Patti Page; Marty Roe; Brian Prout	Top Male Vocalist of the Year
LeAnn Rimes	Entertainer of the Year
