= 2000 Country Music Association Awards =

Annual US music awards ceremony

- Date: October 4, 2000
- Location: Grand Ole Opry House, Nashville, Tennessee
- Hosted by: Vince Gill
- Most wins: Dixie Chicks (4)
- Most nominations: Faith Hill(6); Brad Paisley (6)

Television/radio coverage
- Network: CBS

The 2000 Country Music Association Awards, 34th Ceremony, was held on October 4, 2000, at the Grand Ole Opry House, Nashville, Tennessee, and was hosted by CMA Award Winner, Vince Gill. Faith Hill lead the night with 6 nominations, including Album of the Year, and Entertainer of the Year.

== Winners and Nominees ==
Winner are in Bold.

Entertainer of the Year	Album of the Year
**Dixie Chicks**; Faith Hill; Alan Jackson; Tim McGraw; George Strait	**Fly — Dixie Chicks**; Breathe — Faith Hill; I Hope You Dance — Lee Ann Womack; Under the Influence — Alan Jackson; Who Needs Pictures — Brad Paisley
Male Vocalist of the Year	Female Vocalist of the Year
**Tim McGraw**; Vince Gill; Alan Jackson; Brad Paisley; George Strait	**Faith Hill**; Martina McBride; Jo Dee Messina; Lee Ann Womack; Trisha Yearwood
Vocal Group of the Year	Vocal Duo of the Year
**Dixie Chicks**; Alabama; Asleep At The Wheel; Diamond Rio; Lonestar	**Montgomery Gentry**; Bellamy Brothers; Brooks & Dunn; The Kinleys; The Warren Brothers
Single of the Year	Song of the Year
**"I Hope You Dance"** — **Lee Ann Womack**; "Breathe" — Faith Hill; "Buy Me A Rose" — Kenny Rogers; "He Didn't Have to Be" — Brad Paisley; "How Do You Like Me Now?!" — Toby Keith	**"I Hope You Dance" — Tia Sillers and Mark D. Sanders**; "Amazed" — Aimee Mayo, Chris Lindsey and Marv Green; "Breathe" — Stephanie Bentley and Holly Lamar; "He Didn’t Have To Be" — Brad Paisley and Kelley Lovelace; "Murder on Music Row" — Larry Cordle and Larry Shell
Horizon Award	Musician of the Year
**Brad Paisley**; Sara Evans; Montgomery Gentry; SHeDAISY; Chely Wright	**Hargus "Pig" Robbins**; Paul Franklin; Dann Huff; Brent Mason; Brent Rowan
Music Video of the Year	Music Event of the Year
**Goodbye Earl - Dixie Chicks**; Breathe — Faith Hill; He Didn't Have to Be — Brad Paisley; How Do You Like Me Now?! — Toby Keith; I Hope You Dance — Lee Ann Womack	**Murder on Music Row — Alan Jackson and George Strait**; I Hope You Dance — Lee Ann Womack and Sons of the Desert; Let's Make Love — Faith Hill and Tim McGraw; Roly Poly — Dixie Chicks and Asleep at the Wheel; When I Said I Do — Clint Black and Lisa Hartman Black

== Performers ==
Faith Hill - There Will Come A Day

Alan Jackson - www.memory

Keith Urban - Your Everything (abridged version)

Lee Ann Womack with Sons of the Desert - I Hope You Dance

George Strait - Don't Make Me Come Over There And Love You

SheDaisy - I Will...But (abridged version)

Brad Paisley with Ricky Skaggs - We Danced/Me Neither

The Chicks - Sin Wagon

Kenny Rogers with Billy Dean and Alison Krauss - Buy Me A Rose

Trisha Yearwood with Kim Richey and Mary Chapin Carpenter - Where Are You Now

Tim McGraw - Things Change

Billy Gilman - One Voice (abridged version)

Martina McBride - There You Are

Montgomery Gentry with Charlie Daniels - All Night Long

LeAnn Rimes - I Need You

Vince Gill - Feels Like Love

Jo Dee Messina - Burn

Lonestar - Tell Her

Charley Pride - Medley: Kiss An Angel Good Morning/Crystal Chandeliers/Is Anybody Goin' To San Antone/Kaw-Liga

Toby Keith - How Do You Like Me Now

Reba McEntire - We're So Good Together
