= Part II (Brad Paisley album) =

Studio album by Brad Paisley
- Released: May 29, 2001
- Studios: The Castle (Franklin, Tennessee); Thelma's East (Nashville, Tennessee); EMI (Nashville, Tennessee); Ocean Way (Nashville, Tennessee); Buck Owens Productions (Bakersfield, California)
- Genres: Neotraditional country; honky-tonk
- Length: 50:41
- Label: Arista Nashville
- Producer: Frank Rogers

Brad Paisley chronology
Who Needs Pictures (1999)	Part II (2001)	Mud on the Tires (2003)

Singles from Part II
- 1. "Two People Fell in Love" Released: March 19, 2001; 2. "Wrapped Around" Released: August 20, 2001; 3. "I'm Gonna Miss Her (The Fishin' Song)" Released: February 25, 2002; 4. "I Wish You'd Stay" Released: August 12, 2002

Professional ratings
Review scores
Source	Rating
About.com	5/5 stars
AllMusic	4/5 stars
Country Weekly	(favorable)
Entertainment Weekly	B+
People	(positive)

Part II is the second studio album by American country music artist Brad Paisley. Released on May 29, 2001, through Arista Nashville, it became Paisley's second platinum-certified album in the United States. It produced four singles; "Two People Fell in Love", "Wrapped Around", "I'm Gonna Miss Her (The Fishin' Song)" and "I Wish You'd Stay", which respectively reached number 4, number 2, number 1, and number 7 on the Billboard Hot Country Singles & Tracks (now Hot Country Songs) charts. "Too Country" also entered the country charts from unsolicited airplay.

Written by Darrell Scott, "You'll Never Leave Harlan Alive" was also recorded by Patty Loveless on her 2001 album Mountain Soul and by Kathy Mattea on her 2008 album Coal. The song was featured in the FX TV series Justified. Part II is Paisley's last album to have a neotraditional country sound before he developed a more crossover-friendly country-pop sound.

This album was repackaged with Who Needs Pictures by Sony's Legacy division and released on September 23, 2008.

== Background ==
The title for Paisley's second album as well as the songs on it were inspired by the movie, Father of the Bride Part II, the follow-up to the movie he went to see on his first date with a certain girl several years before his first record deal. They had long since broken up but when the sequel to the movie came out, Paisley couldn't help thinking about her. And wondering if she was thinking about him. "I ended up going to see (the sequel) on the exact day, at the exact same showing that we saw the first one," he says. "I did it on purpose thinking she might be there, too. Well, of course, she wasn't. No one is that psychotic except me."

Disappointed, Paisley channeled his feelings by writing a song with his best friend and frequent songwriting partner, Kelley Lovelace. "We started talking," Paisley says, "and the line came out: 'Hollywood never fails to make a sequel' and 'Why can't love be more like that?' Then, I remember thinking that (Part II) would be a really great title for a second album. And a great concept." To emphasize the sequel theme, the album opens with strings playing "In the Garden", exactly as the previous album had ended.

This event was revisited on Paisley's 2009 album, American Saturday Night during a reprise of the song, "Welcome to the Future".

The album includes a cover of Darrell Scott's bluegrass standard "You'll Never Leave Harlan Alive", which Paisley chose to record because, being a native of West Virginia, he had seen the effect that coal mining had on communities in that region.

== Musical style and composition ==
Part II is a neotraditional country and honky-tonk album with elements of gospel ("The Old Rugged Cross"), the Bakersfield sound, folk ("You'll Never Leave Harlan Alive"), and jazz ("You Have That Effect on Me"). The album has been to compared to the styles of neotraditional country musicians George Strait, Randy Travis, and Alan Jackson, and 1960s honky-tonk performers such as Buck Owens and George Jones, who are featured on the song "Too Country."

== Track listing ==
No.	Title	Writer(s)	Length
1.	"Two Feet of Topsoil"	Brad Paisley; Robert Arthur	2:46
2.	"I'm Gonna Miss Her (The Fishin' Song)"	Paisley; Frank Rogers	3:14
3.	"Part Two"	Paisley; Kelley Lovelace	3:35
4.	"Wrapped Around"	Paisley; Lovelace; Chris DuBois	3:22
5.	"Two People Fell in Love"	Paisley; Lovelace; Tim Owens	4:07
6.	"Come On Over Tonight"	Paisley; Chely Wright	4:33
7.	"You'll Never Leave Harlan Alive"	Darrell Scott	5:04
8.	"I Wish You'd Stay"	Paisley; DuBois	6:17
9.	"All You Really Need Is Love"	Paisley; DuBois; Rogers	2:44
10.	"Munster Rag" (instrumental)	Paisley; James Gregory; Mitch McMichen	3:15
11.	"You Have That Effect on Me"	Paisley; Rogers	4:22
12.	"Too Country" (featuring Buck Owens, Bill Anderson and George Jones)	Bill Anderson; Chuck Cannon	3:31
13.	"The Old Rugged Cross" (live at The Grand Ole Opry, December 16, 2000)	Traditional	3:51

== Personnel ==
Credits from the album's liner notes. The liner notes do not give detailed information for "The Old Rugged Cross".

=== Musicians ===
- Brad Paisley – lead vocals (1–9, 11–13), acoustic guitar (1–12), electric guitars (1–12), 6-string "Tic tac" bass (1–6, 8–10, 12)
- Wes Hightower – backing vocals (1–9, 11–12)
- Chely Wright – backing vocals (3?)
- Sonya Isaacs – backing vocals (7)
- Kenny Lewis – backing vocals (12)
- Bill Anderson – vocals (12)
- George Jones – vocals (12)
- Buck Owens – vocals (12)
- Gary Hooker – acoustic guitar (4), electric guitar (12)
- Kevin Grantt – bass guitar (1–6, 8–11), upright bass (10, 12), vocal stylings (10)
- Bernie Herms – acoustic piano (1–12), keyboards (3, 8), Hammond B3 organ (7, 10, 12), string arrangements (8)
- Eddie Bayers – drums (1, 3–4, 8, 12)
- Ben Sesar – drums (2, 5–7, 9–11)
- Mitch McMitchen – percussion (1–12)
- Ron Block – banjo (1, 10)
- Darrell Scott – banjo (7), dobro (7), mandolin (7), backing vocals (7)
- Jim Heffernan – dobro (1, 10, 12)
- Mike Johnson – steel guitar (1–12), dobro (2)
- Glen Duncan – fiddle (1–4, 7–8, 11–12)
- Justin Williamson – fiddle (1–3, 5–6, 9–10), mandolin (5, 8, 10)
- Carl Marsh – string arrangements and conductor (11)
- Carl Gorodetzky and The Nashville String Machine – strings (8, 11)
- Frank Rogers – "radio performer" (13)
- Little Jimmy Dickens – introduction (13)
- Eddie Stubbs – introduction (13)

=== Production ===
- Frank Rogers – producer
- Richard Barrow – recording/engineer (1–12), mixing
- Tim Farris – recording (13)
- Brian David Willis – overdub recording (1–12), digital editing (1–12)
- David Bryant – additional recording/engineer
- Chris Latham – additional recording/engineer
- Chris O'Donnell – additional recording/engineer
- David Schober – additional recording/engineer
- Mike Purcell – recording assistant (1–12)
- Steve Short – recording assistant (1–12), mix assistant
- Joe Costa – mix assistant
- Hank Williams – mastering
- MasterMix (Nashville, Tennessee) – mastering location
- Susan Sherrill – production assistant
- Beth Lee – art direction, design
- Nigel Parry – photography
- Lori Turk – "grooming"
- Jennifer Kemp – wardrobe stylist
- Jimmy Glimmer – management
- JAG Management – management company

== Charts ==
=== Weekly charts ===
Chart (2001–02)	Peak position
UK Country Albums (Official Charts)	6
US Billboard 200	31
US Top Country Albums (Billboard)	3

=== Year-end charts ===
Chart (2001)	Peak position
Canadian Country Albums (Nielsen SoundScan)	50
US Top Country Albums (Billboard)	39

Chart (2002)	Peak position
Canadian Country Albums (Nielsen SoundScan)	39
US Top Country Albums (Billboard)	19

== Certifications ==
Region	Certification	Certified units/sales
Canada (Music Canada)	Gold	50,000^{^}
United States (RIAA)	Platinum	1,000,000^{^}
^{^} Shipments figures based on certification alone.
