= Love and War (Brad Paisley album) =

Studio album by Brad Paisley
- Released: April 21, 2017
- Genre: Country
- Length: 58:41
- Label: Arista Nashville
- Producers: John Carter Cash; Brad Paisley; Timbaland; Luke Wooten

Brad Paisley chronology
Moonshine in the Trunk (2014)	Love and War (2017)	Son of the Mountains (2023)

Singles from Love and War
- 1. "Today" Released: October 6, 2016; 2. "Last Time for Everything" Released: April 24, 2017; 3. "Heaven South" Released: October 30, 2017

Love and War is the twelfth studio album by American country music singer Brad Paisley. The album was released on April 21, 2017, by Arista Nashville, and is his final album with the label before the closing of Arista's Nashville division in 2023. "Today" was the album's lead single.

== Content ==
The album's originally intended lead single was "Without a Fight", a duet with Demi Lovato, which did not make the album's final track listing. The first single to be included on the album is "Today". Paisley co-produced the album with Luke Wooten.

Included on the album are collaborations with Mick Jagger, John Fogerty, Timbaland, and Bill Anderson. The song "Gold All Over the Ground" is based on a poem written by Johnny Cash in the collection Forever Words.

In April 2017, Paisley released a "visual" version of the album, which features music videos for every song, worked into a singular narrative.

It is Paisley's first album not to feature an instrumental track.

== Critical reception ==
Professional ratings
Aggregate scores
Source	Rating
Metacritic	66/100
Review scores
Source	Rating
AllMusic	2.5/5 stars
Cleveland Plain Dealer	A–
Paste	6.7/10
Rolling Stone	3/5 stars
Variety	(favorable)
Vice (Expert Witness)	A

The album has been met with positive critical reception, with most critics showing favor toward the collaborative tracks and Paisley's use of humor. Will Hermes of Rolling Stone rated the album 3 out of 5 stars. He praised the classic rock influences of the title track and "Drive of Shame", while also considering "selfie#theinternetisforever" "entertaining". He added that "Paisley's pro enough that even his apparent phone-ins are well-crafted. But over 16 tracks, you can't help but wish that one of country's greatest would shoot consistently higher than easy chuckles and sentimental homilies." A review by Variety called the album "strong but uneven", praising Paisley's guitar solos and the collaborations with Mick Jagger, while also noting that "there is a lot of familiar thematic ground to cover in fresh ways". Matt Bjorke of Roughstock was also favorable, saying that "After a little bit of time to work on his music outside of the spotlight, Brad Paisley has created, with Love and War, a project which rivals his best work, even if the album is more or less what fans would've wanted out of another Brad Paisley record." Stephen Thomas Erlewine of AllMusic was less positive, rating the album 2.5 stars out of 5 and noting that "While he never pushes too hard -- even the Timbaland tracks don't call attention to the beats -- the shiny production, shopworn jokes, and eager melodies have the cumulative effect of seeming too ready to please any audience that comes his way. Since Paisley still has his skills, this is often enjoyable -- he knows how to craft songs and can play a mean guitar -- but it's hard not to hear Love and War and think Paisley would be a little bit better off if he learned a lesson from Jagger and Fogerty: sometimes, it's better not to try so hard."

== Commercial performance ==
Love and War debuted at No. 1 on Billboard's Top Country Albums chart, and at No. 13 on the US Billboard 200, selling 26,000 in pure sales copies in the US, making a total of 29,000 equivalent album units including tracks and streams. It has sold 71,200 copies in the US as of December 2017.

== Track listing ==
All tracks are written by Brad Paisley, with additional co-writers as noted.

No.	Title	Writer(s)	Length
1.	"Heaven South"	Brent Anderson; Chris DuBois	4:15
2.	"Last Time for Everything"	Anderson; DuBois; Smith Ahnquist; Mike Ryan	3:50
3.	"One Beer Can"	Anderson; DuBois	3:46
4.	"Go to Bed Early"	Anderson; DuBois; Hannah Dasher	3:20
5.	"Drive of Shame" (featuring Mick Jagger)	Jagger; Matt Clifford	4:33
6.	"Contact High"	Kelley Lovelace; Lee Thomas Miller	4:34
7.	"Love and War" (featuring John Fogerty)	Fogerty	3:51
8.	"Today"	DuBois; Ashley Gorley	3:49
9.	"selfie#theinternetisforever"	DuBois; Jim Beavers	3:41
10.	"Grey Goose Chase" (featuring Timbaland)	Jared Gutstadt; Miller; Timothy Mosley	3:05
11.	"Gold All Over the Ground"	Johnny Cash	3:33
12.	"Dying to See Her" (featuring Bill Anderson)	Anderson	3:45
13.	"Solar Power Girl" (featuring Timbaland)	Gutstadt; Mosley	3:44
14.	"The Devil Is Alive and Well"	Robert Arthur; Kenny Lewis	3:59
15.	"Meaning Again"	Lovelace; Miller	3:45
16.	"Heaven South (Reprise)"	Anderson; DuBois	1:11

== Personnel ==
Vocals

- Jessi Alexander – Vocal harmony
- Bill Anderson — Featured artist
- Hannah Dasher – Vocal harmony
- John Fogerty – Featured artist
- Audrey Kate Geiger – Vocal harmony
- Wes Hightower – Vocal harmony
- Mick Jagger – Featured artist
- Gale Mayes – Vocal harmony
- Brad Paisley – Primary artist, vocal harmony
- Angela Primm – Vocal harmony
- Timbaland – Featured artist
- Baylor Wilson – Vocal harmony

Musicians

- Brent Anderson – Acoustic guitar
- Matt Clifford – Keyboards
- Randel Currie – Pedal steel
- John Fogerty – Electric guitar
- Gary Hooker – Electric guitar
- Mick Jagger – Rhythm guitar, tambourine
- Daniel Jones – Keyboards, synthesizer
- Kenny Lewis – Bass
- Kendall Marcy – Banjo, Hammond B3, keyboards, piano, synthesizer
- Gordon Mote – Keyboards, piano
- Brad Paisley – Acoustic guitar, dobro, electric guitar, mandolin
- Michael Rhodes – Bass
- Ben Sesar – Drums
- Timbaland – Percussion
- Justin Williamson – Fiddle

Production

- Matthew Berinato — Art direction
- John Carter Cash – Producer
- Scott Johnson – Production assistant
- Bob Ludwig – Mastering
- Kendall Marcy – Executive producer
- Brad Paisley – Producer
- Timothy Mosley – Producer, programming
- Luke Wooten – Producer

== Charts ==
=== Weekly charts ===
Chart (2017)	Peak position
Australian Albums (ARIA)	22
Belgian Albums (Ultratop Flanders)	174
Belgian Albums (Ultratop Wallonia)	185
Canadian Albums (Billboard)	11
Norwegian Albums (VG-lista)	24
Scottish Albums (Official Charts)	17
Swiss Albums (Schweizer Hitparade)	26
UK Albums (Official Charts)	33
US Billboard 200	13
US Top Country Albums (Billboard)	1

=== Year-end charts ===
Chart (2017)	Position
US Top Country Albums (Billboard)	66
