= Last Time for Everything =

Single by Brad Paisley

from the album Love and War
- Released: April 24, 2017
- Genre: Country
- Length: 3:51
- Label: Arista Nashville
- Songwriters: Brad Paisley; Smith Ahnquist; Brent Anderson; Chris DuBois; Mike Ryan
- Producers: Brad Paisley; Luke Wooten

Brad Paisley singles chronology
"Today" (2016)	"Last Time for Everything" (2017)	"Heaven South" (2017)

"Last Time for Everything" is a song recorded by American country music artist Brad Paisley. It was released on April 24, 2017 by Arista Nashville as the second single from his eleventh studio album, Love and War. It was released as a single three days after the album was released. Paisley co-wrote the song with Smith Ahnquist, Brent Anderson, Chris DuBois and Mike Ryan, and co-produced it with Luke Wooten.

== Content ==
The song has a central theme of nostalgia, listing off several notable events which one may encounter for the last time. It is accompanied mainly by a "syncopated guitar riff". Paisley said of the song, "It’s nostalgia, there’s guitar playing, it’s sort of a bunch of different influences come out. You can hear elements of Van Halen and The Police that I just sort of buried and subtly put in there that kind of represent different eras. There’s humor in it...and this song is everything I love about country music." Chris Parton of Rolling Stone wrote that "the tune is built around Paisley’s ace guitar work. His revolving, Police-evoking main riff is doused in slippery twang, but his solo mixes in some arena rock-influenced finger tapping fireworks."

== Music video ==
The music video was directed by Jeff Venable and premiered on CMT, GAC and Vevo in June 2017. Paisley's wife, Kimberly Williams-Paisley, stars in the video.

== Charts ==
=== Weekly charts ===
Chart (2017)	Peak position
US Bubbling Under Hot 100 (Billboard)	20
US Country Airplay (Billboard)	19
US Hot Country Songs (Billboard)	26

=== Year-end charts ===
Chart (2017)	Position
US Hot Country Songs (Billboard)	70
