= Today (Brad Paisley song) =

Single by Brad Paisley

from the album Love and War
- Released: October 6, 2016
- Genre: Country
- Length: 3:49
- Label: Arista Nashville
- Songwriters: Brad Paisley; Chris DuBois; Ashley Gorley
- Producers: Brad Paisley; Luke Wooten

Brad Paisley singles chronology
"Without a Fight" (2016)	"Today" (2016)	"Last Time for Everything" (2017)

Music video
- "Today" on YouTube

"Today" is a song recorded by American country music artist Brad Paisley. It was released on October 6, 2016, by Arista Nashville as the first single from his eleventh studio album, Love and War. Paisley co-wrote the song with Chris DuBois and Ashley Gorley, and co-produced it with Luke Wooten.

== Commercial performance ==
"Today" gave Paisley his first number one on the Billboard Country Digital Song sales chart. It accumulated 41,000 downloads in its debut week and after its first full week, jumped from number 49 to 12 on the Hot Country Songs chart, with 1.1 million first-week streams and an airplay audience of 3.9 million. To date, this is Paisley’s last solo Top 10 hit. The song has sold 151,000 copies as of March 2017.

== Usage in other media ==
The song was featured in Comedy Central animated series South Park episode "Buddha Box".

== Music video ==
The music video was directed by Paisley and Jim Shea and premiered in October 2016. The emotional video quickly went viral after its release and has been viewed over 25 million times during the first week with over ½ million shares on Facebook.

The video focuses on the song's central idea of a happy memory being enough to sustain one through the hard times.

== Charts ==
=== Weekly charts ===
Chart (2016–2017)	Peak position
Canada Hot 100 (Billboard)	100
Canada Country (Billboard)	5
US Billboard Hot 100	67
US Country Airplay (Billboard)	3
US Hot Country Songs (Billboard)	7

=== Year-end charts ===
Chart (2017)	Position
Canada Country (Billboard)	44
US Country Airplay (Billboard)	32
US Hot Country Songs (Billboard)	50

== Certifications ==
Region	Certification	Certified units/sales
Canada (Music Canada)	Gold	40,000^{‡}
^{‡} Sales+streaming figures based on certification alone.
