= Bucked Off =

Single by Brad Paisley
- Released: November 12, 2018
- Genre: Country
- Length: 4:13
- Label: Arista Nashville
- Songwriters: Brad Paisley; Kelley Lovelace; Chris DuBois
- Producers: Brad Paisley; Dann Huff

Brad Paisley singles chronology
"Heaven South" (2017)	"Bucked Off" (2018)	"My Miracle" (2019)

"Bucked Off" is a song recorded by American country music artist Brad Paisley. It was released on November 12, 2018 by Arista Nashville. Paisley co-wrote the song with Kelley Lovelace and Chris DuBois, and co-produced it with Dann Huff.

== Content ==
Jon Freeman of Rolling Stone wrote that the song is "an upbeat meditation on the emotional risks of dating and relationships. Paisley makes the comparison that putting oneself in that vulnerable situation feels like riding a bull at the rodeo, with its various attendant risks." The song also makes lyrical references to George Strait, name-dropping his songs "Marina del Rey", "I Can Still Make Cheyenne", and "The Cowboy Rides Away".

For the song's music video, Paisley incorporated footage of himself performing the song at Tootsie's Orchid Lounge along with clips of various humorous breakups and original content submitted by fans.

== Charts ==
Chart (2018)	Peak position
US Country Airplay (Billboard)	24
