= Without a Fight (song) =

2016 single by Brad Paisley

Single by Brad Paisley featuring Demi Lovato
- Released: May 13, 2016
- Genre: Country
- Length: 3:54
- Label: Arista Nashville
- Songwriters: Brad Paisley; Kelley Lovelace; Lee Thomas Miller
- Producers: Brad Paisley; Luke Wooten

Brad Paisley singles chronology
"Country Nation" (2015)	"Without a Fight" (2016)	"Today" (2016)

Demi Lovato singles chronology
"Stone Cold" (2016)	"Without a Fight" (2016)	"Body Say" (2016)

Music video
- "Without a Fight" on YouTube

"Without a Fight" is a song by American country music singer Brad Paisley featuring American singer Demi Lovato. It was released on May 13, 2016, by Arista Nashville. Paisley co-wrote the song with Kelley Lovelace and Lee Thomas Miller, and co-produced it with Luke Wooten. Originally believed to be a release from Paisley's then-upcoming album Love and War, the song did not make the final track list. "Without a Fight" won a Teen Choice Award in 2016.

== Chart performance ==
"Without a Fight" peaked at number 16 on the Billboard Country Airplay chart for the week of August 20, 2016. It peaked at number 23 on the US Hot Country Songs chart for the week of July 16, 2016. As of July 2016, the song has sold 61,000 copies in the US.

== Music video ==
A lyric video for the song was released on YouTube via Paisley's official Vevo channel on May 13, 2016 which features behind-the-scenes footage of the song's recording process. The official music video for the song was released on June 17, 2016.

== Live performances ==
Lovato joined Paisley to perform the song at the Irvine Meadows Amphitheatre on May 20, 2016. Lovato and Paisley made their television performance debut of the song at Jimmy Kimmel Live! on May 24.

== Charts ==
=== Weekly charts ===
Weekly chart performance for "Without a Fight"
Chart (2016)	Peak position
Canada Country (Billboard)	12
US Bubbling Under Hot 100 (Billboard)	5
US Country Airplay (Billboard)	16
US Hot Country Songs (Billboard)	23

=== Year-end charts ===
Year-end chart performance for "Without a Fight"
Chart (2016)	Peak position
US Hot Country Songs (Billboard)	78
