= Anything Like Me =

Single by Brad Paisley

from the album Hits Alive
- Released: August 16, 2010
- Genre: Country
- Length: 4:13 (original version); 4:29 (Hits Alive version); 4:05 (radio edit)
- Label: Arista Nashville
- Songwriters: Brad Paisley; Chris DuBois; Dave Turnbull
- Producer: Frank Rogers

Brad Paisley singles chronology
| "Water" (2010) | "Anything Like Me" (2010) | "This Is Country Music" (2010) |

"Anything Like Me" is a song co-written and recorded by American country music singer Brad Paisley. Originally included on his 2009 album American Saturday Night, the song was released in August 2010 as the lead-off single from his compilation album Hits Alive. Paisley wrote this song with Dave Turnbull and Chris DuBois.

== Content ==
The song is from the perspective of an anxious father-to-be who discovers that he and his wife will soon have a son, and instantly begins fretting over what will happen if his son is like he was when he was young. He envisions his son climbing a tree too tall, riding his bike too fast, and trying to melt a Tonka truck with a magnifying glass. As the song nears its end, he slowly becomes more optimistic, concluding that "there's worse folks to be like".

== Critical reception ==
Janet Goodman of Engine 145 gave the song a "thumbs up," saying that its humor would make it connect with listeners and comparing it thematically to "Letter to Me." Chris Neal of Country Weekly thought that the song was one of several to address Paisley's family. Reviewing the album for The New York Times, Ben Ratliff thought that the song was "so much smarter" for expressing the anxiety associated with raising a son. Leeann Ward of Country Universe gave the song a B+ grade, saying that the strongest part of the song is the "understated production that is almost all acoustic with the electric instruments still being gentle and unobtrusive."

== Chart performance ==
| Chart (2010) | Peak position |
|---|---|
| Canada Country (Billboard) | 1 |
| Canada Hot 100 (Billboard) | 66 |
| US Billboard Hot 100 | 48 |
| US Hot Country Songs (Billboard) | 1 |

=== Year-end charts ===
| Chart (2010) | Position |
|---|---|
| US Country Songs (Billboard) | 51 |

| Chart (2011) | Position |
|---|---|
| US Country Songs (Billboard) | 90 |
