= Me Neither =

Single by Brad Paisley

from the album Who Needs Pictures
- B-side: "Don't Breathe"
- Released: February 7, 2000
- Recorded: 1999
- Genre: Country
- Length: 3:19
- Label: Arista Nashville
- Songwriters: Brad Paisley; Chris DuBois; Frank Rogers
- Producer: Frank Rogers

Brad Paisley singles chronology
"He Didn't Have to Be" (1999)	"Me Neither" (2000)	"We Danced" (2000)

"Me Neither" is a song co-written and recorded by American country music artist Brad Paisley. It was released in February 2000 as the third single from Paisley's album Who Needs Pictures and reached a peak of number 18 on the Billboard Hot Country Songs chart in mid-2000. The song was previously included on the soundtrack of the 1999 film Happy, Texas. Paisley wrote this song with Frank Rogers and Chris DuBois.

== Background ==
Brad Paisley said this about the origin of the song: "Every guy has been there. You're talking to a girl and realizing that it's going nowhere--but you still keep trying. I know I've been turned down enough to feel like I've really lived this song. Frank, Chris and I wrote it in the car on our way back from Frank's family beach house in Garden City, South Carolina. We'd spent a week there writing, and it was really successful. In fact, that's where we wrote 'Who Needs Pictures.' Anyway, we had this nine-and-a-half-hour drive back home. So Frank sat in the back seat with a guitar. I sat in front with a notebook, and Chris drove. By the time we got to Nashville, we had just about every line done."

== Content ==
"Me Neither" is an up-tempo in which the narrator is attempting to attract a female's attention by asking her various questions, such as whether or not she would like to dance, or if she "believe[s] in love at first sight". Even though the girl constantly rejects him, he turns around each question that he asks her with a response of "me neither" (e.g. "Darling, tell me, would you like to dance? / Me neither, I was just being polite / Thank goodness, my feet are much too tired"). In the final chorus, he considers his attempt to converse with her as "a waste of time" before adding "Don't you think it's time for me to end this song? Me neither." After this line, the song extends into a series of fiddle, piano, steel guitar, and electric guitar solos.

Billboard described the song favorably in their singles review section dated for February 12, 2000, saying "All in all, this is a great little record that further demonstrates just why Paisley is the hottest new artist in the format." This review also compared its "wit and personality" to Roger Miller.

Paisley later included the song as the B-side to his singles "We Danced" and "Two People Fell in Love."

== Parodies ==
Cledus T. Judd parodied the song on his 2000 album Just Another Day in Parodies, under the title "More Beaver" (a reference to the TV series Leave It to Beaver). Paisley also plays guitar on this parody.

== Chart performance ==
"Me Neither" debuted at number 65 on the U.S. Billboard Hot Country Songs for the week of February 12, 2000. "Me Neither" spent 20 weeks on the Billboard Hot Country Songs, peaking at number 18 in mid-2000. It is the second single of his career not to reach the top 10, the last one until "Camouflage" peaked at number 15 in December 2011, and the lowest-peaking single of his career until "Heaven South" failed to enter the top 40.

Chart (2000)	Peak position
Canada Country Singles (RPM)	21
US Billboard Hot 100	85
US Hot Country Songs (Billboard)	18

=== Year-end charts ===
Chart (2000)	Position
US Country Songs (Billboard)	65
