= Then (Brad Paisley song) =

Single by Brad Paisley

from the album American Saturday Night
- Released: March 23, 2009
- Genre: Country
- Length: 4:16 (single edit); 5:21 (album version)
- Label: Arista Nashville
- Songwriters: Chris DuBois; Ashley Gorley; Brad Paisley
- Producer: Frank Rogers

Brad Paisley singles chronology
"Start a Band" (2008)	"Then" (2009)	"Welcome to the Future" (2009)

"Then" is a song co-written and recorded by American country music artist Brad Paisley. It is his twenty-third entry on the Billboard country charts, debuting at number 26 on the chart week of April 4, 2009. The song is the lead-off single from his seventh studio album, American Saturday Night, which was released via Arista Nashville on June 30, 2009. It is one of Paisley's four songs certified 2× Platinum by the Recording Industry Association of America, the others being "She's Everything", "Whiskey Lullaby", and "Remind Me". Paisley wrote this song with Ashley Gorley and Chris DuBois.

== Content ==
"Then" is a ballad, backed primarily by piano and electric guitar. In it, the male narrator expresses his love for his female partner. In the verses, he recalls various events in their relationship, such as meeting for the first time, kissing on her porch, and then proposing to her at the place where they first met. In the chorus, he says how much stronger his love has become since their first meeting.

== Critical reception ==
The song has been given mixed critical reviews. Robert Christgau included it at number 12 in his ballot for Rolling Stone's list of the decades' best songs. Liz Jungers gave a favorable review on Roughstock, saying that the song was well written and produced, and that it showed a more serious side to Paisley, in contrast to his novelty songs such as "Ticks" and "Online". Leeann Ward of Country Universe gave it a B− rating, saying that it was largely cliché but adding that it was "an admirable enough sentiment with an inoffensive production, but it’s not at all impressive coming from an artist with so many years of songwriting experience behind him." Juli Thanki of Engine 145, however, gave the song a thumbs-down rating. Thanki's review criticized the song for lacking lyrical depth, and called it "a bland collection of memories and observations about an anonymous girl who is now Paisley’s whole life and world."

== Personnel ==
As listed in liner notes

- Randle Currie - steel guitar
- Eric Darken - percussion
- Kevin "Swine" Grantt - bass guitar
- Wes Hightower - background vocals
- Gordon Mote - piano
- Brad Paisley - lead vocals, electric guitar, acoustic guitar
- Ben Sesar - drums
- Justin Williamson - fiddle

=== Gang Vocals (album version only) ===
- Robert Arthur
- Tracie Hamilton
- Gary Hooker
- Kendal Marcy
- Tim Owens
- Valerie Pringle
- Ben Sesar
- Emily Reeves
- Missy Reeves
- Scott Reeves

== Chart performance ==
"Then" debuted at number 26 on the Billboard Hot Country Songs charts dated for the week of April 4, 2009. It became his tenth consecutive Number One hit for the week of June 6, 2009. In August of the same year, "Then" became Paisley's first entry on the Hot Adult Contemporary Tracks charts, debuting at number 30.

=== Weekly charts ===
Chart (2009)	Peak Position
Canada Country (Billboard)	1
Canada Hot 100 (Billboard)	52
US Billboard Hot 100	28
US Adult Contemporary (Billboard)	19
US Hot Country Songs (Billboard)	1

=== Year-end charts ===
Chart (2009)	Position
US Billboard Hot 100	84
US Country Songs (Billboard)	15

== Certifications ==
Region	Certification	Certified units/sales
Canada (Music Canada)	Platinum	80,000^{‡}
United States (RIAA)	2× Platinum	2,000,000^{‡}
^{‡} Sales+streaming figures based on certification alone.
