= Mud on the Tires =

Studio album by Brad Paisley
- Released: July 22, 2003
- Studio: The Castle (Franklin, Tennessee)
- Genre: Country
- Length: 60:53
- Label: Arista Nashville
- Producer: Frank Rogers

Brad Paisley chronology
| Part II (2001) | Mud on the Tires (2003) | Time Well Wasted (2005) |

Singles from Mud on the Tires
- 1. "Celebrity" Released: March 17, 2003; 2. "Little Moments" Released: September 1, 2003; 3. "Whiskey Lullaby" Released: March 29, 2004; 4. "Mud on the Tires" Released: September 13, 2004

Professional ratings
Review scores
| Source | Rating |
|---|---|
| About.com | 4.5/5 stars |
| AllMusic | 4/5 stars |
| Christgau's Consumer Guide | (2-star Honorable Mention) |
| Entertainment Weekly | B+ |
| People | (average) |
| USA Today | 3.5/4 stars |

Mud on the Tires is the third studio album by American country music artist Brad Paisley. Released on July 22, 2003, through Arista Nashville, it produced four hit singles on the Billboard Hot Country Singles & Tracks (now Hot Country Songs) charts: the Top Five hits "Celebrity", "Little Moments" and "Whiskey Lullaby", as well as the Number One title track. The album itself has been certified 2× Platinum by the RIAA, while "Whiskey Lullaby" and the title-track have been certified as gold singles. Mud on the Tires is Paisley's first album to feature a crossover-friendly country-pop sound, which was a departure from his earlier neotraditional country albums.

== Content ==
The album produced four singles for Paisley. First was "Celebrity", which peaked at number 3 on the country charts. Following it were the number 2 "Little Moments", and then the number 3 "Whiskey Lullaby" in 2004. This latter song, a duet with Alison Krauss, was her first Top 40 country hit since her guest vocal on Kenny Rogers' Number One hit "Buy Me a Rose" in 2000. "Whiskey Lullaby" was later covered by Jon Randall, who co-wrote it, on his 2005 album Walking Among the Living. The title track was the fourth and final release from this album. In February 2005, this song became Paisley's fourth Number One hit, and his first since “I'm Gonna Miss Her (The Fishin' Song)” in 2002.

"Is It Raining at Your House" is a cover of a song originally recorded by Vern Gosdin on his 1988 album Chiseled in Stone. Gosdin's rendition was a number 10 country hit that year. "Spaghetti Western Swing" is a narrative skit featuring Redd Volkaert. The final track is a hidden track called "Kung Pao", another skit featuring Bill Anderson, George Jones and "Little" Jimmy Dickens.

"The Cigar Song" is based on an urban legend about a man who purchases expensive cigars and takes out insurance on them, then smokes them and asks for the insurance money after claiming that they were lost in a "series of small fires".

== Track listing ==
| No. | Title | Writer(s) | Length |
|---|---|---|---|
| 1. | "Mud on the Tires" | Brad Paisley; Chris DuBois | 3:28 |
| 2. | "Celebrity" | Paisley | 3:43 |
| 3. | "Ain't Nothin' Like" | Don Sampson; Wynn Varble | 3:35 |
| 4. | "Little Moments" | Paisley; DuBois | 3:39 |
| 5. | "That's Love" (featuring Dan Aykroyd and James Belushi on background vocals) | Paisley; DuBois; Kelley Lovelace | 4:43 |
| 6. | "Somebody Knows You Now" | Paisley | 3:42 |
| 7. | "Famous People" | DuBois; Chris Wallin | 4:10 |
| 8. | "Hold Me in Your Arms (And Let Me Fall)" | Paisley; DuBois; Lovelace | 4:24 |
| 9. | "Whiskey Lullaby" (duet with Alison Krauss) | Bill Anderson; Jon Randall | 4:19 |
| 10. | "The Best Thing That I Had Goin'" | Jerry Salley; Chris Stapleton | 4:08 |
| 11. | "The Cigar Song" | Paisley | 3:37 |
| 12. | "Make a Mistake" | Paisley | 1:33 |
| 13. | "Make a Mistake with Me" (instrumental) | Paisley | 3:15 |
| 14. | "Is It Raining at Your House" | Hank Cochran; Dean Dillon; Vern Gosdin | 4:01 |
| 15. | "Spaghetti Western Swing" (narrative featuring Redd Volkaert & Kung Pao Buckaroos) | Paisley; Kevin Grantt; Frank Rogers | 4:32 |
| 16. | "Farther Along" | traditional, arr. by Paisley | 5:23 |
| 17. | "Kung Pao" (hidden track featuring the Kung Pao Buckaroos (Bill Anderson, George Jones and Little Jimmy Dickens)) | | 1:00 |

== Personnel ==
=== Musicians ===
- Brad Paisley – lead vocals, acoustic guitar (1–4, 6–11, 13, 15, 16), electric guitars (1–8, 10–16), tic-tac bass (1–5, 7), 12-string guitar (2), mandolin (2, 6, 10), Go-bro (6), baritone guitar (9), 6-string bass guitar (11)
- Bernie Herms – acoustic piano (3, 4, 5, 8, 10, 13–16), Hammond B3 organ (6)
- Gordon Mote – Hammond B3 organ (4, 11)
- Jim "Moose" Brown – Hammond B3 organ (7)
- Gary Hooker – electric guitar (14), tic-tac bass (14)
- Redd Volkaert – electric guitar (15)
- Ron Block – banjo (1, 7, 10)
- Randle Currie – steel guitar (1, 2, 4, 5, 7, 8, 11, 13–16), pedabro (3)
- Jerry Douglas – dobro (9, 10)
- Kevin Grantt – bass guitar (1, 2, 4, 5, 7, 8, 10, 11, 14, 15, 16), upright bass (3, 9, 13), fretless bass (6), tic-tac bass (8)
- Ben Sesar – drums (1, 2, 4, 5, 6, 8, 9, 10, 13–16)
- Randy Hardison – drums (7)
- Eric Darken – percussion (1–11, 13–16), handclaps (8)
- Frank Rogers – handclaps (8)
- Brian David Willis – handclaps (8)
- Justin Williamson – fiddle (1–5, 8, 9, 11, 13, 14, 16)
- Alison Krauss – viola (9), lead and harmony vocals (9)
- Don Sampson – whistling (3)
- Wes Hightower – backing vocals (1–8, 10, 11, 14)
- Dan Aykroyd – backing vocals (5)
- Jim Belushi – backing vocals (5)
- Vince Gill – backing vocals (8)
- Kenny Lewis – backing vocals (9), bass guitar (10)
- Dan Tyminski – backing vocals (9)

Fingersnaps on "Ain't Nothin' Like"

- Darrell Hayes, Morgane Hayes, Jessica Rogers, Don Sampson and Wynn Varble

Children's Chorus on "Ain't Nothin' Like"

- Charles NcCallie, Manny Rogers, Emma Sampson, Maddie Sampson and Georgia Claire Varble

Chorus on "Farther Along"

- Neal Cappellino, Vince Gill, Wes Hightower, Valerie Pringle, Frank Rogers, Steve Short and Brian David Willis

=== Production ===
- Frank Rogers – producer, digital editing
- Richard Barrow – recording, digital editing
- Brian David Willis – recording, digital editing
- Justin Niebank – mixing
- Neal Cappellino – additional recording, digital editing
- Jason Lehning – additional recording
- Kendal Marcy – additional recording
- Steve Short – recording assistant, mix assistant
- Drew Bollman – mix assistant
- Adam Hatley – digital editing
- Ronnie Thomas – additional digital editing
- Hank Williams – mastering
- C. A. Dreyer – production assistant
- Astrid Hebrold May – art direction, design
- Russ Harrington – photography

== Charts ==
=== Weekly charts ===
| Chart (2003–05) | Peak position |
|---|---|
| UK Country Albums (Official Charts) | 5 |
| US Billboard 200 | 8 |
| US Top Country Albums (Billboard) | 1 |

=== Year-end charts ===
| Chart (2003) | Position |
|---|---|
| US Top Country Albums (Billboard) | 29 |

| Chart (2004) | Position |
|---|---|
| US Billboard 200 | 59 |
| US Top Country Albums (Billboard)) | 9 |

| Chart (2005) | Position |
|---|---|
| US Billboard 200 | 100 |
| US Top Country Albums (Billboard) | 17 |

== Certifications ==
| Region | Certification | Certified units/sales |
|---|---|---|
| United States (RIAA) | 2× Platinum | 2,000,000^{^} |
^{^} Shipments figures based on certification alone.
