= Heaven South =

Single by Brad Paisley

from the album Love and War
- Released: October 30, 2017
- Genre: Country
- Length: 4:15
- Label: Arista Nashville
- Songwriters: Brad Paisley; Brent Anderson; Chris DuBois
- Producers: Brad Paisley; Luke Wooten

Brad Paisley singles chronology
"Last Time for Everything" (2017)	"Heaven South" (2017)	"Bucked Off" (2018)

Music video
- "Heaven South'" on YouTube

"Heaven South" is a song recorded by American country music artist Brad Paisley. It was released on October 30, 2017, by Arista Nashville as the third single from his eleventh studio album, Love and War. Paisley co-wrote the song with Brent Anderson and Chris DuBois, and co-produced it with Luke Wooten.

== Content ==
Paisley wrote the song with frequent collaborator Chris DuBois and singer Brent Anderson. Rolling Stone described the song as a "nostalgic anthem" and "a mid-tempo tour of the Southern everytown that’s anchored by a brightly picked mandolin, Paisley’s trademark Telecaster twang and a giant, arena-ready 'whoa-oh' chorus." The song is a list of positive imagery of the Southern United States, referring to such imagery as "just another day in Heaven south."

== Music video ==
The video for the song was filmed in Franklin, Tennessee. It features footage of the town square, along with back roads and fields. Starring in the video are Paisley's road band and over 400 extras. He recruited the extras by announcing the video shoot to fans on his Twitter account.

== Charts ==
Chart (2017)	Peak position
US Country Airplay (Billboard)	48
US Hot Country Songs (Billboard)	47
