= Who Needs Pictures (song) =

Single by Brad Paisley

from the album Who Needs Pictures
- B-side: "It Never Woulda Worked Out Anyway"
- Released: February 1, 1999
- Genre: Country
- Length: 3:45
- Label: Arista Nashville
- Songwriters: Brad Paisley; Chris DuBois; Frank Rogers
- Producer: Frank Rogers

Brad Paisley singles chronology
| "Who Needs Pictures" (1999) | "He Didn't Have to Be" (1999) |

"Who Needs Pictures" is a debut song co-written and recorded by American country music artist Brad Paisley. It was released in February 1999 as his debut single, as well as the first single and title track from his album Who Needs Pictures. It reached number 12 on the Hot Country Songs chart. Paisley wrote this song with Frank Rogers and Chris DuBois.

== Content ==
The song's protagonist tells of finding an undeveloped camera, which contains pictures of him and his previous lover - enjoying themselves in Cozumel, Mexico, and Baton Rouge, Louisiana. At first, he considers developing the film in the camera, but then, he changes his mind, asking himself, "Who needs pictures / With a memory like mine?"

== Music video ==
This was Paisley's first music video, directed by Jim Shea, was filmed in Los Angeles.

== Personnel ==
- Eddie Bayers – drums
- Glen Duncan – fiddle, mandolin
- James Gregory – bass guitar
- Bernie Herms – piano, Hammond B-3 organ, string, strings arrangements
- Wes Hightower – background vocals
- Mike Johnson – steel guitar, Dobro
- Tim Lauer – accordion
- Brad Paisley – lead vocals, electric guitar, acoustic guitar, six string bass
- Frank Rogers – banjo

== Chart performance ==
"Who Needs Pictures" debuted at number 75 on the Billboard Hot Country Songs dated for the week ending February 6, 1999. It spent 31 weeks on the charts and peaked at number 12.

| Chart (1999) | Peak Position |
|---|---|
| Canada Country Singles (RPM) | 11 |
| US Billboard Hot 100 | 65 |
| US Hot Country Songs (Billboard) | 12 |

=== Year-end charts ===
| Chart (1999) | Position |
|---|---|
| Canada Country Tracks (RPM) | 78 |
| US Country Songs (Billboard) | 45 |
