= Little Moments =

Single by Brad Paisley

from the album Mud on the Tires
- Released: September 1, 2003
- Recorded: 2003
- Genre: Country
- Length: 3:39 (album version); 3:49 (radio version)
- Label: Arista Nashville
- Songwriters: Brad Paisley; Chris DuBois
- Producer: Frank Rogers

Brad Paisley singles chronology
"Celebrity" (2003)	"Little Moments" (2003)	"Whiskey Lullaby" (2004)

"Little Moments" is a song co-written and recorded by American country music singer Brad Paisley. It was released in September 2003 as the second single from Paisley's album Mud on the Tires. Paisley wrote this song with Chris DuBois.

== Content ==
Brad Paisley has stated that his wife Kimberly Williams-Paisley was the basis for this song and appears in the music video. Specifically the opening part, which reads as follows:

"Well I'll never forget the first time that I heard that pretty mouth say that dirty word. And I can't even remember now, what she backed my truck into. But she covered her mouth and her face got red and she just looked so darn cute. That I couldn't even act like I was mad- Yeah I live for little moments like that."

The two events were taken right from the first time Brad heard her swear and how she started to blush when he found a dent in his truck.

== Music video ==
The music video was directed by Jim Shea and Peter Tilden. It features different couples who explain how they started their relationships. The last couple is Paisley and his own wife, Kimberly Williams-Paisley, talking. His wife implies that song was written about her. Except for a few quick shots during the guitar solo, the video features Brad entirely with his signature cowboy hat off. It was released in early 2004.

== Personnel ==
- Randle Currie - steel guitar
- Eric Darken - percussion
- Kevin "Swine" Grantt - bass guitar
- Bernie Herms - piano
- Wes Hightower - background vocals
- Gordon J. Mote - B3 organ
- Brad Paisley - lead vocals, electric guitar, acoustic guitar, Tic tac bass
- Ben Sesar - drums
- Justin Williamson - fiddle

== Chart performance ==
"Little Moments" debuted at number 58 on the U.S. Billboard Hot Country Singles & Tracks for the week of September 6, 2003.

Chart (2003–2004)	Peak position
US Billboard Hot 100	35
US Hot Country Songs (Billboard)	2

=== Year-end charts ===
Chart (2004)	Position
US Country Songs (Billboard)	15
