= Mike Ryan (musician) =

American singer-songwriter

Mike Ryan is a country singer, songwriter, and guitarist from San Antonio, Texas. He has released two studio albums and one EP.

Ryan was born in 1988, and attended the University of North Texas, where he began performing publicly. After touring regionally, he released an EP, The First One, in 2010, and his debut studio album, Night Comes Falling, in 2012. He then signed a publishing contract with Sea Gayle Music, and released his second studio album, Bad Reputation, in 2014. Three songs from Bad Reputation—"Dancing All Around It," "Wasting No More Whiskey," and "Bad Reputation"—reached number one on the Texas country music chart, and Ryan was named New Male Vocalist of the Year in 2015 by industry association Texas Regional Radio. He released "New Hometown," the lead single from his third studio album, in October 2016. In 2017, he released his third studio album, Blink You'll Miss It. In 2021, his single, Can Down reached number five on the Texas country music chart.
