= Welcome to the Future =

Single by Brad Paisley

from the album American Saturday Night
- Released: July 13, 2009
- Genre: Country rock
- Length: 4:43 (single edit); 5:52 (album version)
- Label: Arista Nashville
- Songwriters: Chris DuBois; Brad Paisley
- Producer: Frank Rogers

Brad Paisley singles chronology
"Then" (2009)	"Welcome to the Future" (2009)	"American Saturday Night" (2009)

"Welcome to the Future" is a song co-written and recorded by American country music artist Brad Paisley released on July 13, 2009, as the second single from his eighth studio album American Saturday Night (2009). It is the twenty-fourth chart single of his career. In July 2009, Paisley played the song at the White House for President Barack Obama and First Lady Michelle Obama. The song was written by Paisley along with Chris DuBois.

== Content ==
"Welcome to the Future" is a mid-tempo country rock song with a production featuring percussion and steel guitar, with a synthesizer in the intro. The lyrics describe the changes that the narrator has seen in his lifetime, including the advances in technology and inter-cultural relationships.

In the first verse, he tells of how he wanted to be able to watch television in the car as a child, or have his own video game system instead of having to go to the video arcade, and compares it to today when he can play video games on his phone. The second verse addresses advances in international relationships, by telling of how his grandfather fought against Japan in World War II, but the narrator "was on a video chat this morning / with a company in Tokyo." Verse three addresses the issue of racism after recalling a black friend who had a cross burned in his front yard by the Ku Klux Klan. This verse also alludes to the anti-racist activism of Rosa Parks and Martin Luther King Jr. in the line "From a woman on a bus / to a man with a dream."

Paisley told Country Weekly magazine that he was inspired to write the song after hearing the announcement that Barack Obama, whom Paisley endorsed, would become President of the United States and realizing that the first president in his children's lives would be an African American. This thought also led him to include memories of his own childhood in the song, as well as those of his grandparents. As he stated in his performance at the White House: "If you go back in time and tell either me in a line for Pac-Man, or [my grandfather] any of this stuff, that his grandson would be playing in Japan, he would've thought you were crazy...and then, my own children who -- you are the first president they will remember, which is something." Paisley also said that he included the allusion to Dr. King's "I Have a Dream" speech in the final verse because he thought that King's "dream of racial equality" was realized by Obama's election.

== Reprise ==
The album features a reprise of the song where Paisley talks more specifically about his own personal life. In particular, it mentions how he attended a showing of Father of the Bride with a girl from his hometown. After breaking up, he wondered who his wife would be and what his children would be like, saying he got his answer when he tucked them in. This is a reference to the fact that his wife, Kimberly Williams-Paisley starred in that particular movie. The song is reprised again as an instrumental version on the album's hidden track "Back to the Future".

== Critical reception ==
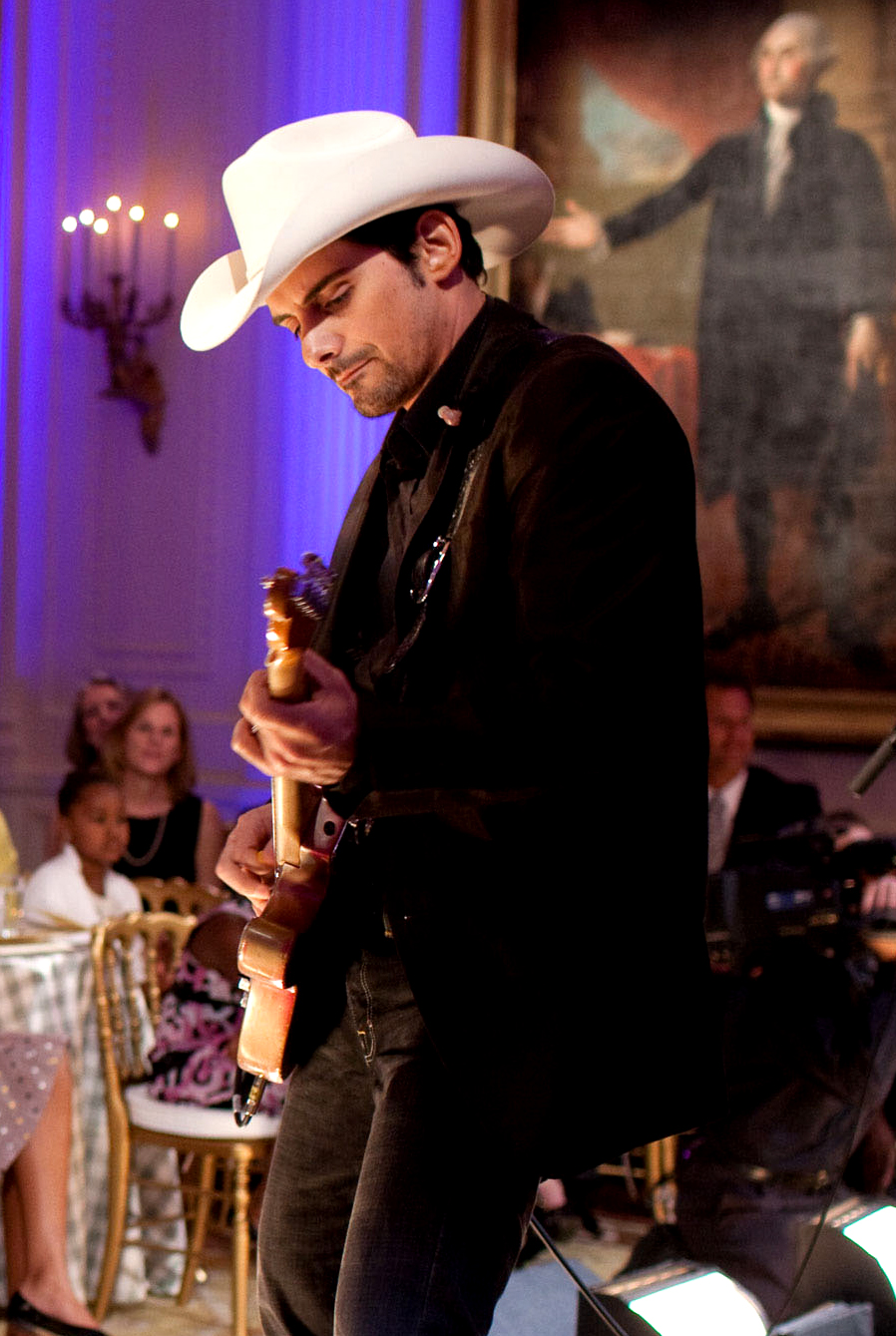
Paisley at the White House on July 21, 2009.

The song has received positive reviews from music critics. Matt Bjorke of Roughstock described the song's intro as reminiscent of video game music, but said that it "quickly gives way to steel guitar and heartland rock-like acoustic guitar strumming." He considered the theme similar to Paisley's 2007 single "Letter to Me" and said, "It's an interesting direction to take a song as it describes how life changes over time." Stephen Thomas Erlewine also described the song favorably in his AllMusic review, saying that it was the "first country anthem of the Obama era" and that it showed "Paisley's uncanny knack for capturing the casual contemporary details of American life at the tail-end of the 2000s." Jody Rosen of Rolling Stone also described this song favorably, saying that it and the album's title track showed a sense of optimism in his music.

Paisley gave his first live performance of the song at the White House in July 2009.

On June 1, 2014, Rolling Stone magazine ranked "Welcome to the Future" #100 in their list of the 100 greatest country songs. In a 2024 update of their rankings, Rolling Stone expanded the list to 200 and placed the song at #200.

== Music video ==
The music video for "Welcome to the Future" was directed by Jim Shea and released in mid-August 2009. It was filmed in New York City, Washington D.C., Los Angeles, Tokyo and Kumamoto, Japan.

== Chart performance ==
"Welcome to the Future" debuted at number 59 on the U.S. Billboard Hot Country Songs chart for the week of July 11, 2009. Having peaked at number 2 on that chart (behind "Toes" by Zac Brown Band), the song became Paisley's first single to miss number one since 2005's "Alcohol" and ended a streak of ten consecutive number one hits for him.

Chart (2009)	Peak Position
Canada Country (Billboard)	1
Canada Hot 100 (Billboard)	60
US Billboard Hot 100	42
US Hot Country Songs (Billboard)	2

=== Year-end charts ===
Chart (2009)	Position
US Country Songs (Billboard)	24
