= Mud on the Tires (song) =

Single by Brad Paisley

from the album Mud on the Tires
- Released: September 13, 2004
- Recorded: 2003
- Genre: Country
- Length: 3:28
- Label: Arista Nashville
- Songwriters: Brad Paisley; Chris DuBois
- Producer: Frank Rogers

Brad Paisley singles chronology
"Whiskey Lullaby" (2004)	"Mud on the Tires" (2004)	"Alcohol" (2005)

"Mud on the Tires" is a song co-written and recorded by American country music singer Brad Paisley. It was released in September 2004 as the fourth and final single and title track off Paisley's album Mud on the Tires. The song reached number-one on the U.S. Billboard Hot Country Songs chart and peaked at number 30 on the U.S. Billboard Hot 100 chart. It was written by Paisley and Chris DuBois.

== Content ==
In the song, the narrator sings about finally getting a loan and buying a new Chevrolet pickup truck. He suggests to his significant other that they go out into the woods and hang out, breaking the truck in and getting some "mud on the tires." Chevrolet sponsored the product placement in the song. The album cover features a 2002 Chevrolet Silverado.

== Music video ==
The music video features Brad performing the song live at an event called Mudstock while people party and watch from a very muddy terrain. Also during the video, two women argue about whether Brad “plays great” or “looks better” and end up fighting in the mud, parodying Miller Lite's "Great Taste, Less Filling" advertising campaign of the time, as Brad and the late Little Jimmy Dickens watch the commercial and admit they "will buy whatever the commercial is selling."

== Chart performance ==
The song debuted at number 54 on the U.S. Billboard Hot Country Singles & Tracks for the week ending September 11, 2004.

Chart (2004–2005)	Peak position
Canada Country (Radio & Records)	1
US Billboard Hot 100	30
US Hot Country Songs (Billboard)	1

=== Year-end charts ===
Chart (2005)	Position
US Country Songs (Billboard)	11

== Certifications ==
Region	Certification	Certified units/sales
Canada (Music Canada)	Platinum	80,000^{‡}
United States (RIAA)	Platinum	1,000,000^{‡}
^{‡} Sales+streaming figures based on certification alone.
