= American Saturday Night =

Studio album by Brad Paisley
- Released: June 30, 2009
- Recorded: December 11, 2008 – March 2009
- Studio: The Castle (Franklin, Tennessee)
- Genre: Country
- Length: 62:16
- Label: Arista Nashville
- Producer: Frank Rogers

Brad Paisley chronology
Playlist: The Very Best of Brad Paisley (2009)	American Saturday Night (2009)	Hits Alive (2010)

Singles from American Saturday Night
- 1. "Then" Released: March 23, 2009; 2. "Welcome to the Future" Released: July 13, 2009; 3. "American Saturday Night" Released: November 16, 2009; 4. "Water" Released: March 29, 2010

American Saturday Night is the eighth studio album by American country music artist Brad Paisley. It was released on June 30, 2009, by Arista Nashville. Like all of his previous studio albums, it is produced by Frank Rogers. The first single, "Then," has become his fourteenth Number One on the Hot Country Songs chart. iTunes released songs from the album weekly as part of the countdown to the album's release. "Water" was released on June 9, 2009, followed by the title track on June 16 and "Everybody's Here" on June 23. The second radio single is "Welcome to the Future." The title track was released as the third single on November 16, 2009. As of the chart dated January 8, 2011, the album has sold 714,812 copies in the US. It earned a 2009 Academy of Country Music Awards nomination for "Album of the Year". In 2012, MSN.com listed American Saturday Night as one of the 21 Essential 21st-Century Albums.

== Background ==
In an interview with USA Today, Paisley said he took a more direct approach with this album: "I'm not so worried about making the songwriters in town sit and take notice, as I am wanting people to feel like I really meant what I said on this record."

== Critical reception ==
Professional ratings
Review scores
Source	Rating
AllMusic	5/5 stars
Billboard	86/100
Entertainment Weekly	A−
MSN Music (Consumer Guide)	A
PopMatters	8/10
Q	3/5 stars
Rolling Stone	4/5 stars
Spin	9/10
USA Today	3.5/4 stars

The album was lauded by critics. According to Metacritic, the album holds a score of 78 out of 100 based on 13 reviews, indicating "generally favorable reviews". Chris William of Entertainment Weekly wrote, "Paisley discs usually include instrumentals, comedy sketches, and gospel. Here, he drops that lovable detritus, going for constant home runs." The Dallas Morning News also gave it an A− and said it "blends everything that's great about Paisley without overdoing the positives." Country Weekly also gave it four stars out of five and called it "another sterling entry in an increasingly imposing body of work." Roughstock gave it a favorable review and called it "the work of an artist fully in command of both himself and his audience and it’s a record that is likely to become the most successful and popular release of his career." The Washington Post also gave it a favorable review and said of Paisley, "As on most of the album's other songs, his delivery is honest and true, free of mawkishness, full of feeling and fine-tuned to its emotional core." The New York Times gave it a positive review and said that "Mr. Paisley's songs are better when they're more abstract. The title track celebrates America as a mongrel nation, but it mostly expresses that thought through our playtime consumption: Dutch beer, Canadian bacon, Brazilian leather. A very big thought is being missed here." BBC Music also gave it a favorable review and called it "a terrific and subtly clever album, a(nother) spirited and worthwhile challenge by Paisley to the prejudices of both sides of country's enduring schism." The Boston Globe also gave it a favorable review and called it "a smartly produced album that, while adhering to the blueprint for commercial-radio country music, successfully lassos a loose party vibe."

It was #1 on Time magazine's list of The Top Ten Albums of 2009. Rhapsody (online music service) ranked the album #12 on its "Country’s Best Albums of the Decade" list and #13 on its list of "The 25 Best Albums of 2009".

Legendary rock critic Robert Christgau named it the best album of 2009

== Track listing ==
No.	Title	Writer(s)	Length
1.	"American Saturday Night"	Brad Paisley; Kelley Lovelace; Ashley Gorley	4:34
2.	"Everybody's Here"	Paisley; Jim Beavers; Chris DuBois	3:31
3.	"Welcome to the Future"	Paisley; DuBois	5:52
4.	"Then"	Paisley; DuBois; Gorley	5:21
5.	"Water"	Paisley; DuBois; Lovelace	4:21
6.	"She's Her Own Woman"	Paisley; Jody Harris; Kenny Lewis	4:29
7.	"Welcome to the Future" (reprise)	Paisley; DuBois	1:19
8.	"Anything Like Me"	Paisley; DuBois; Dave Turnbull	4:13
9.	"You Do the Math"	Paisley; Robert Arthur; Tim Owens	4:36
10.	"No"	Paisley; Bill Anderson; Jon Randall	4:20
11.	"Catch All the Fish"	Paisley; DuBois; Gorley	4:08
12.	"Oh Yeah, You're Gone"	Paisley; Robben Ford	5:36
13.	"The Pants"	Paisley; DuBois; Owens	4:36
14.	"I Hope That's Me"	Paisley; DuBois; Owens	3:40
15.	"Back to the Future" (Instrumental) (hidden track)	Paisley; DuBois	1:30
Total length:			62:16

== Personnel ==
As listed in liner notes:

- Brad Paisley – lead vocals, backing vocals, electric guitar, acoustic guitar, mandolin
- Neal Cappellino – acoustic piano (1)
- Jim "Moose" Brown – acoustic piano (2, 6, 11–14), Wurlitzer electric piano (2, 6, 11–14), Hammond B3 organ (2, 6, 11–14)
- Kendal Marcy – acoustic piano (3, 5, 11, 14), banjo (3, 5, 11, 14)
- Gordon Mote – acoustic piano (3, 4, 10), keyboards (3, 4, 10)
- Frank Rogers – electric guitar, acoustic guitar, backing vocals
- Gary Hooker – acoustic guitar (3, 10, 11)
- Robert Arthur – acoustic guitar (9, 13)
- Robben Ford – electric guitar (12)
- Randle Currie – steel guitar (1–6, 8–14)
- Mike Johnson – dobro (8)
- Bryan Sutton – mandolin (8)
- Kevin "Swine" Grantt – bass (1, 2, 4, 5, 6, 8, 9, 11–14)
- Kenny Lewis – bass (3, 9, 10)
- Ben Sesar – drums (1–6, 8–14)
- Brian David Willis – drums (9)
- Eric Darken – percussion (1–6, 8–14)
- Justin Williamson – fiddle (1–6, 8–14)
- Wes Hightower – backing vocals (1–6, 8–14)
- Huck Paisley – guest vocals (8)

Gang Vocals (tracks 1, 3, 4 & 13)

- Robert Arthur, Tracie Hamilton, Gary Hooker, Kendal Marcy, Tim Owens, Valerie Pringle, Emily Reeves, Missy Reeves, Scott Reeves and Ben Sesar

Vocals by the Dramamine Kings on "Catch All the Fish"

- Randle Currie, Jody Harris, Kenny Lewis, Kendal Marcy, Ben Sesar and Justin Williamson

== Production ==
- Frank Rogers – producer
- Chris DuBois – executive producer
- Jim Catino – A&R direction
- Richard Barrow – recording, overdub recording
- Brian David Willis – recording, digital editing, mixing (7)
- Neal Cappellino – overdub recording, digital editing
- Jason Lehning – overdub recording
- Steve Beers – recording assistant
- Rich Ramsey – recording assistant
- John Paterno – additional overdub recording (12)
- Chris Kahn – additional overdub recording (12), overdub recording assistant (12)
- Jun Murakswa – additional overdub recording (12), overdub recording assistant (12)
- Brady Barnett – digital editing
- Tyler Moles – digital editing
- Justin Niebank – mixing (1–6, 8–14)
- Drew Bollman – mix assistant (1–6, 8–14)
- Hank Williams – mastering
- Phillip Stein – production assistant
- Tammie Harris Cleek – imaging production
- Scott McDaniel – creative director
- Brad Paisley – creative director, cover design
- Judy Forde-Blair – creative production, liner notes
- Tracy Baskette-Fleaner – art direction, design
- Kirk Markus – studio photography
- The Fitzgerald Hartley Co. – management

== Chart performance ==
=== Weekly charts ===
Chart (2009)	Peak position
Australian Albums (ARIA)	67
Canadian Albums (Billboard)	6
US Billboard 200	2
US Top Country Albums (Billboard)	1

=== Year-end charts ===
Chart (2009)	Position
US Billboard 200	82
US Top Country Albums (Billboard)	19
Chart (2010)	Position
US Billboard 200	110
US Top Country Albums (Billboard)	18

=== Singles ===
Year	Single	Peak chart positions			
Year	Single	US Country	US	US AC	CAN
2009	"Then"	1	28	19	52
2009	"Welcome to the Future"	2	42	—	60
2009	"American Saturday Night"	2	67	—	66
2010	"Water"	1	42	—	54
"—" denotes releases that did not chart

== Certifications ==
Region	Certification
Canada (Music Canada)	Gold
United States (RIAA)	Gold
