= Water (Brad Paisley song) =

Single by Brad Paisley

from the album American Saturday Night
- Released: March 29, 2010
- Genre: Country
- Length: 4:21 (Album Version); 3:30 (Single Version)
- Label: Arista Nashville
- Songwriters: Brad Paisley; Chris DuBois; Kelley Lovelace
- Producer: Frank Rogers

Brad Paisley singles chronology
| "American Saturday Night" (2009) | "Water" (2010) | "Anything Like Me" (2010) |

"Water" is a song co-written and recorded by American country music singer Brad Paisley. It was released in March 2010 as the fourth single from his album American Saturday Night. The song first charted in 2009 as an album cut before its release to radio. Paisley wrote this song with Kelley Lovelace and Chris DuBois.

== Content ==
In "Water," the narrator lists off various situations involving water: playing in a kiddie pool as a child, jumping from a rope swing with friends on a riverbank, and later wet t-shirt contests on spring break and skinny dipping with a girlfriend. He describes each situation as beginning a "love affair with Water."

== Music video ==
The music video was directed by Jim Shea. It premiered on his website on April 15, 2010 and features Brad playing guitar in a pool and funny videos of people interacting with water.

== Critical reception ==
Chris Neal of Country Weekly, in his review of the album, wrote that the song is "destined to be heard throughout the season at campouts and backyard parties" and that its theme made the album "first and foremost a summer album." Mario Tarradell of The Dallas Morning News cited the track as an example of Paisley's humor, saying that it did not "wear out [its] welcome the way 'Ticks' did."

Joe Heim of The Washington Post thought that "Water" was a "clunker" and "should have been subtracted" from the album. Allen Jacobs of Roughstock gave the song a 3.5/5 rating, saying that "it's a song that anyone who loves to have a good time will relate to and that’s exactly the point of it."

== Chart performance ==
"Water" first charted in 2009 from unsolicited airplay received after its release, bringing it to number 55 on the Billboard Hot Country Songs charts.

Upon its release as a single, the song re-entered the country singles charts at number 48 on the chart dated for the week ending March 27, 2010.

| Chart (2010) | Peak position |
|---|---|
| Canada Country (Billboard) | 1 |
| Canada Hot 100 (Billboard) | 54 |
| US Billboard Hot 100 | 42 |
| US Hot Country Songs (Billboard) | 1 |

=== Year-end charts ===
| Chart (2010) | Position |
|---|---|
| US Country Songs (Billboard) | 18 |

== Certifications ==
| Region | Certification | Certified units/sales |
|---|---|---|
| Canada (Music Canada) | Gold | 40,000^{‡} |
| United States (RIAA) | Gold | 500,000^{*} |
^{*} Sales figures based on certification alone.^{‡} Sales+streaming figures based on certification alone.
