= I Wish You'd Stay =

Single by Brad Paisley

from the album Part II
- Released: August 12, 2002
- Genre: Country
- Length: 6:17 (album version); 4:37 (music video version); 3:57 (single edit 1); 5:20 (single edit 2)
- Label: Arista Nashville
- Songwriters: Brad Paisley; Chris DuBois
- Producer: Frank Rogers

Brad Paisley singles chronology
"I'm Gonna Miss Her (The Fishin' Song)" (2002)	"I Wish You'd Stay" (2002)	"Celebrity" (2003)

"I Wish You'd Stay" is a song co-written and recorded by American country music singer Brad Paisley. It was released in August 2002 as the fourth and final single from Paisley's album Part II and reached a peak of number 7 on the Billboard Hot Country Singles & Tracks chart in early 2003. The song was originally released as the b-side to Paisley's previous single, "I'm Gonna Miss Her (The Fishin' Song)." Paisley wrote this song with Chris DuBois.

== Content ==
The song is a ballad, in which the narrator states that he hopes his significant other finds love when they leave his side, but he wishes the person would stay with him.

== Music video ==
The music video was directed by Brad Paisley and Devin Pense and premiered on November 11, 2002 on CMT.

== Personnel ==
- Eddie Bayers – drums
- Glen Duncan – fiddle
- Kevin "Swine" Grantt – bass guitar
- Bernie Herms – piano, keyboards, string arrangements
- Wes Hightower – background vocals
- Mike Johnson – steel guitar
- Mitch McMitchen – percussion
- Brad Paisley – lead vocals, electric guitar, acoustic guitar, 6 string tic tac
- Justin Williamson – mandolin

Strings by Carl Gorodetsky and the Nashville String Machine

== Chart performance ==
"I Wish You'd Stay" debuted at number 59 on the U.S. Billboard Hot Country Singles & Tracks for the week of August 17, 2002.

Chart (2002–2003)	Peak position
US Billboard Hot 100	57
US Hot Country Songs (Billboard)	7

=== Year-end charts ===
Chart (2003)	Position
US Country Songs (Billboard)	47
