= Wrapped Around =

Single by Brad Paisley

from the album Part II
- B-side: "All You Really Need Is Love"
- Released: August 20, 2001
- Genre: Country
- Length: 3:22 (album version); 3:06 (single version)
- Label: Arista
- Songwriters: Brad Paisley; Chris DuBois; Kelley Lovelace
- Producer: Frank Rogers

Brad Paisley singles chronology
"Two People Fell in Love" (2001)	"Wrapped Around" (2001)	"I'm Gonna Miss Her (The Fishin' Song)" (2002)

"Wrapped Around" is a song co-written and recorded by American country music artist Brad Paisley. It was released in August 2001 as the second single released from Paisley's album Part II and reached a peak of number 2 on the Billboard Hot Country Singles & Tracks chart in February 2002. It also peaked at number 35 on the Hot 100. Paisley wrote this song with Kelley Lovelace and Chris DuBois.

== Content ==
The narrator talks about how his significant other is all he ever thinks about and consumes his life. He then discusses how she has had him "wrapped around her finger" ever since they first started dating. He also discusses how he thinks it is time to get married despite being together for only seven months.

== Critical reception ==
Chuck Taylor, of Billboard magazine reviewed the song favorably saying that the song has "a personality-packed vocal performance, an infectious uptempo melody marked by an insinuating guitar riff, and a happy-to-be-in-love lyric." Taylor also calls it a "perky anthem" and says that Rogers' production "exemplifies all that is good about both contemporary and traditional country music."

== Music video ==
The music video was directed by Brad Paisley and Jim Shea and was filmed on June 2, 2001. It begins with two children who say they are in love. Paisley says that "it's only been seven months" and the boy states "but that's long enough!" It also features Paisley in concert and around the theme park, Dollywood.

== Personnel ==
- Eddie Bayers - drums
- Glen Duncan - fiddle
- Kevin "Swine" Grantt - bass guitar
- Bernie Herms - piano
- Wes Hightower - background vocals
- Gary Hooker - acoustic guitar
- Mike Johnson - steel guitar
- Mitch McMitchen - percussion
- Brad Paisley - lead vocals, electric guitar, acoustic guitar, 6 string tic tac

== Chart performance ==
"Wrapped Around" debuted at number 49 on the U.S. Billboard Hot Country Singles & Tracks for the week of September 1, 2001.

Chart (2001–2002)	Peak position
US Billboard Hot 100	35
US Hot Country Songs (Billboard)	2

=== Year-end charts ===
Chart (2002)	Position
US Country Songs (Billboard)	29
