= American Saturday Night (song) =

Single by Brad Paisley

from the album American Saturday Night
- Released: November 16, 2009
- Genre: Country
- Length: 4:34 (Album Version); 3:24 (Single Version)
- Label: Arista Nashville
- Songwriters: Ashley Gorley; Kelley Lovelace; Brad Paisley
- Producer: Frank Rogers

Brad Paisley singles chronology
"Welcome to the Future" (2009)	"American Saturday Night" (2009)	"Water" (2010)

Music video
- "American Saturday Night" on YouTube

"American Saturday Night" is a song written by Ashley Gorley and Kelley Lovelace, and co-written and recorded by American country music artist Brad Paisley. The song originally charted as an album cut based on unsolicited airplay, charting at number 59 on the Billboard Hot Country Songs charts, and number 21 on the Billboard Bubbling Under Hot 100. It was then released as the third single from his sixth studio album, also titled American Saturday Night, in November 2009. Following its official release as a single, it re-entered the country charts at number 41.

== Content ==
In the song, the narrator lists off various foreign-themed items such as "Brazilian leather boots," a German car, The Beatles, Canadian bacon, French kissing, and toga parties, using each as illustrative examples of the cultural diversity in the United States. In the last verse, he also addresses the country's acceptance of foreign immigrants.

Paisley wrote the song with Kelley Lovelace and Ashley Gorley, both of whom have written several of his other single releases. When the three were writing "American Saturday Night," they decided to make "up-tempo songs that weren't necessarily funny." Gorley and Lovelace decided to include a lyric that contained "Live from... it's Saturday night" in reference to Saturday Night Live's introductory "Live from New York, it's Saturday night." After Paisley wrote the line "It's a French kiss, Italian ice, Spanish moss in the moonlight / Just another American Saturday night" for the chorus, the three decided to use the song to illustrate "the things that are borrowed from other countries and traditions that make America great," according to Gorley.

== Critical reception ==
CM Wilcox of The 9513, in his review of the album, said that "[t]he heart of the album is in songs like 'Welcome to the Future' and the title track, which see Paisley easing into an armchair and commenting on the world around him from a smart historical perspective." Matt Bjorke of Roughstock said that it was "a nice, observational piece of songwriting[.]" Chris Neal of Country Weekly magazine gave the single four-and-a-half stars out of five, calling it an example of Paisley's "us[ing] his knack for clever lyrical details to address a hefty theme." Both Bjorke and Neal compared the song's theme to that of "Welcome to the Future."

== Music video ==
The music video was released to cmt.com on December 16, 2009. It is largely animated, and includes stop motion. Graphics make it look like a pop-up-book. Every person in this video is flat, like a board game piece. It was directed by Scott Scovill and Craig Countryman. It is also Brad's final video to feature a cameo from his good friend Little Jimmy Dickens, (who made cameos in several other Paisley videos prior) before his death in 2015.

== Chart performance ==
Before its release to radio, "American Saturday Night" charted at number 59 on Hot Country Songs based on unsolicited airplay. It later re-entered at number 41 on the chart week of November 21, 2009. It then peaked at number 2 in February 2010, behind Josh Turner's "Why Don't We Just Dance".

Chart (2009–2010)	Peak position
Canada Country (Billboard)	1
Canada Hot 100 (Billboard)	66
US Billboard Hot 100	67
US Hot Country Songs (Billboard)	2

=== Year-end charts ===
Chart (2010)	Position
US Country Songs (Billboard)	34
