= Two People Fell in Love =

2001 song by Brad Paisley

Single by Brad Paisley

from the album Part II
- B-side: "Me Neither"
- Released: March 19, 2001
- Genre: Country
- Length: 4:07
- Label: Arista Nashville
- Songwriters: Brad Paisley; Kelley Lovelace; Tim Owens
- Producer: Frank Rogers

Brad Paisley singles chronology
"We Danced" (2000)	"Two People Fell in Love" (2001)	"Wrapped Around" (2001)

"Two People Fell in Love" is a song co-written and recorded by American country music artist Brad Paisley. It was released in March 2001 as the first single from Paisley's album Part II and reached a peak of number 4 on the Billboard Hot Country Songs in mid-2001. The song was written by Paisley, Kelley Lovelace and Tim Owens.

== Content ==
According to Paisley, this song "is about the fact that you can trace everything back to two people's romance. The reason you're here, the reason I'm here is our parents saw something in one another, fell in love and we're the product. It goes back to everybody that's ever been born. It's like a snapshot of real life that's set in motion because you see it happening. You hear these stories throughout the song there's three different scenarios about people that fell in love and changed their little part of the world by doing so."

== Music video ==
The music video was directed by Deaton-Flanigen. It premiered on April 5, 2001 on CMT.

== Personnel ==
- Kevin "Swine" Grantt – bass guitar
- Bernie Herms – piano
- Wes Hightower – background vocals
- Mike Johnson – steel guitar
- Mitch McMitchen – percussion
- Brad Paisley – lead vocals, electric guitar, acoustic guitar
- Ben Sesar – drums
- Justin Williamson – fiddle, mandolin

== Chart performance ==
"Two People Fell in Love" debuted at number 48 on the U.S. Billboard Hot Country Songs for the week of March 24, 2001.

Chart (2001)	Peak position
US Billboard Hot 100	51
US Hot Country Songs (Billboard)	4

=== Year-end charts ===
Chart (2001)	Position
US Country Songs (Billboard)	26
