= Whiskey Lullaby =

Single by Brad Paisley featuring Alison Krauss

from the album Mud on the Tires
- Released: March 29, 2004
- Recorded: 2003
- Genre: Country
- Length: 4:19 (album version); 3:46 (single version)
- Label: Arista Nashville
- Songwriters: Bill Anderson; Jon Randall
- Producer: Frank Rogers

Brad Paisley singles chronology
"Little Moments" (2003)	"Whiskey Lullaby" (2004)	"Mud on the Tires" (2004)

Alison Krauss singles chronology
"Restless" (2004)	"Whiskey Lullaby" (2004)	"Goodbye Is All We Have" (2005)

"Whiskey Lullaby" is a song, written by Bill Anderson and Jon Randall. The song was a duet recorded by American country music artist Brad Paisley and bluegrass artist Alison Krauss on Paisley's album Mud on the Tires. The song was released on March 29, 2004, as the album's third single, and the 11th chart single of Paisley's career. Whiskey Lullaby peaked at No. 3 on the Billboard Hot Country Singles & Tracks (now Hot Country Songs) charts, and No. 41 on the Billboard Hot 100. The song won the 2005 Country Music Association Song of the Year Award. It was certified 2× Platinum by the Recording Industry Association of America.

== Content ==
"Whiskey Lullaby" is an acoustic ballad in the key of B minor, accompanied by acoustic guitar and Dobro. Its narrative centers on a couple that has a painful separation leading them both to drinking themselves to death. In the first verse the heartbroken man dies and in the second verse the guilt-ridden woman dies.

Paisley sings the first verse and chorus which focus on the male character, and Krauss sings the second verse and chorus which focus on the female character.

== Inspiration ==
Jon Randall, one of the song's co-writers, had just divorced from country singer Lorrie Morgan before writing this song. In addition, he had lost a record deal, and had not been able to find a songwriting contract either. He found himself drinking whiskey regularly, and pursuing sexual desires. After seeing the condition that Randall was in at the time, his manager told him,

"Hey man, every now and then you've got to put a bottle to your head and pull the trigger."

Randall then wrote down that line, and decided to use it in a song. He then met Bill Anderson and began to write the song, which eventually made its way to Paisley. When Paisley originally discovered the song, he had told Anderson that he would like to record it with either Alison Krauss or Dolly Parton; Anderson agreed to either singer as he is a fan of both. The song was then recorded by Paisley and Krauss. Randall himself also included a version on his 2005 album Walking Among the Living.

== Music video ==
The music video is set in the years just after World War II. It begins with a bus full of war veterans, one of whom, played by Rick Schroder (who also directed the video) looks at a picture of himself kissing his wife under a willow tree (the wife is played by Marisa Petroro, who also appeared in the video for Montgomery Gentry's "Speed"). He has a flashback of swinging her in his arms under the tree and telling her he will love her forever; she tells him that once he returns from the war, they will start their family. As the man steps off the bus and into his house, he sees pictures of the two of them. Again, the man hears his wife's voice telling him that they will start a family when he returns home. But the scene is shattered when he finds his wife in bed with another man. He leaves and the song begins.

The first verse of the song in the video shows the man drinking excessively, unable to get his wife off his mind. His alcoholism kills him, and the first chorus depicts his funeral in 1946 and his wife crying. The second verse depicts the wife's own descent into alcoholism; while inebriated, she sees the face of her deceased husband in the faces of other men. She exhibits guilt for her husband's death and finds solace only when drinking alcohol. Just before the second chorus, the woman cries and drinks alcohol from a bottle at her husband's grave; finally, the chorus depicts her funeral in 1947. At the end of the song, a little girl (played by Rick Schroder's real-life daughter) looks at the graves and sees the ghosts of the couple, who are hugging and kissing. The crosses on the graves reveal that the couple were Richard (born in 1916, died in 1946) and Katherine Bartlett (born in 1919, died in 1947).

Interwoven with the storyline are shots of Paisley, and Krauss performing the song on stage at a concert hall.

The music video was filmed on June 6 and 7, 2004, in Nashville. It premiered on June 30, 2004, on CMT.

== Personnel ==
- Eric Darken – percussion
- Jerry Douglas – Dobro
- Kevin "Swine" Grantt – upright bass
- Alison Krauss – lead vocals, viola
- Kenny Lewis – background vocals
- Brad Paisley – lead vocals, baritone guitar
- Ben Sesar – drums
- Dan Tyminski – background vocals
- Justin Williamson – fiddle

== Chart performance ==
"Whiskey Lullaby" debuted at No. 48 on the U.S. Billboard Hot Country Singles & Tracks for the week of April 10, 2004. By April 2016, the song had sold more than 1.9 million digital copies.

Chart (2004)	Peak Position
Canada Country (Radio & Records)	3
US Billboard Hot 100	41
US Hot Country Songs (Billboard)	3

=== Year-end charts ===
Chart (2004)	Position
US Country Songs (Billboard)	18

== Certifications ==
Region	Certification	Certified units/sales
Canada (Music Canada)	Platinum	80,000^{‡}
New Zealand (RMNZ)	Platinum	30,000^{‡}
United Kingdom (BPI)	Silver	200,000^{‡}
United States (RIAA)	2× Platinum	1,935,000
^{‡} Sales+streaming figures based on certification alone.
