= I'm Gonna Miss Her (The Fishin' Song) =

Single by Brad Paisley

from the album Part II
- B-side: "I Wish You'd Stay"
- Released: February 25, 2002
- Genre: Honky-tonk
- Length: 3:14
- Label: Arista
- Songwriters: Brad Paisley; Frank Rogers
- Producer: Frank Rogers

Brad Paisley singles chronology
"Wrapped Around" (2001)	"I'm Gonna Miss Her (The Fishin' Song)" (2002)	"I Wish You'd Stay" (2002)

"I'm Gonna Miss Her (The Fishin' Song)" is a song co-written and recorded by American country music artist Brad Paisley. It was released in February 2002 as the third single from his album Part II. The song reached the top of the Billboard Hot Country Songs chart (then known as the Hot Country Singles & Tracks chart) that year, becoming the third number-one hit of Paisley's career. Paisley wrote this song with Frank Rogers, who also produced it.

== Writing and inspiration ==
While still a student at Belmont University in Nashville, Tennessee, in the early 1990s, Paisley had been asked to participate in a student concert. Having primarily sung ballads at that point in his career, he decided to add a novelty song to his repertoire. Frank Rogers, a fellow student who would eventually become Paisley's record producer, agreed, suggesting that they should "write something that will make them laugh", and the two then began to write the song. Their collaboration resulted in "I'm Gonna Miss Her (The Fishin' Song)", a moderate up-tempo, centralizing on a male character whose lover has threatened to leave him if he goes fishing instead of staying home with her. Having chosen to go fishing instead, the character then states that he will "miss her when [he gets] home".

When Paisley performed the song at the student concert, he received a positive reaction from the audience members, who began to laugh and cheer once he reached the first chorus. After signing to his recording contract with Arista Nashville in 1999, Paisley planned to place the song on his debut album Who Needs Pictures. Although the label had wanted him to do so, Rogers thought that the "song was better for a more established artist".

Although Garth Brooks, George Strait, and Alan Jackson had all shown interest in recording the song, Paisley kept it to himself after the success of his Who Needs Pictures album. He then recorded "I'm Gonna Miss Her" for his Part II album, and the song was released as that album's third single, despite Paisley's initial reluctance, as he had thought that the concept of a male choosing fishing over love might be offensive to female listeners.

== Critical reception ==
The song went on to reach the top of the Billboard country charts for 2 weeks in mid-2002, becoming Paisley's third Number One hit on the country charts. In addition, it received Song of the Year, Single of the Year, and Video of the Year nominations from the Country Music Association; in addition, its music video received the award for "Concept Video of the Year" at CMT's 2002 Flameworthy Awards.

== Music video ==
The music video was directed by Peter Zavadil and premiered on February 22, 2002, on CMT. The video starred country legend Little Jimmy Dickens, fishing legend Hank Parker, television presenter Jerry Springer, sports broadcaster Dan Patrick (Patrick's part was filmed on January 27, 2002.) and Paisley's future wife Kimberly Williams.

== Personnel ==
Credits from the album's liner notes.

- Brad Paisley – lead vocals, acoustic guitar, electric guitars, 6-string "Tic tac" bass
- Wes Hightower – backing vocals
- Kevin Grantt – bass guitar
- Bernie Herms – piano
- Ben Sesar – drums
- Mitch McMitchen – percussion
- Mike Johnson – steel guitar, dobro
- Glen Duncan – fiddle
- Justin Williamson – fiddle

Production

- Frank Rogers – producer
- Richard Barrow – recording/engineer, mixing
- Mike Purcell – recording assistant
- Steve Short – recording assistant, mix assistant
- Joe Costa – mix assistant
- Susan Sherrill – production assistant

== Chart performance ==
"I'm Gonna Miss Her" spent twenty-five weeks on the Billboard Hot Country Singles & Tracks (now Hot Country Songs) charts, peaking at Number One on the chart dated for the week ending July 6, 2002 and holding that position for two weeks. It was the third Number One hit of Paisley's career. The song's B-side, "I Wish You'd Stay," was released as the album's next single late in the year.

Chart (2002)	Peak position
US Billboard Hot 100	29
US Hot Country Songs (Billboard)	1

=== Year-end charts ===
Chart (2002)	Position
US Country Songs (Billboard)	25

== Certifications ==
Region	Certification	Certified units/sales
Canada (Music Canada)	Gold	40,000^{‡}
United States (RIAA)	Gold	500,000^{‡}
^{‡} Sales+streaming figures based on certification alone.
