= We Danced =

Single by Brad Paisley

from the album Who Needs Pictures
- B-side: "Me Neither"
- Released: June 26, 2000
- Genre: Country
- Length: 3:45
- Label: Arista Nashville
- Songwriters: Brad Paisley; Chris DuBois
- Producer: Frank Rogers

Brad Paisley singles chronology
"Me Neither" (2000)	"We Danced" (2000)	"Two People Fell in Love" (2001)

"We Danced" is a song co-written and recorded by American country music artist Brad Paisley. It was released in June 2000 as the fourth and final single from his debut album Who Needs Pictures. The song reached the top of the Billboard Hot Country Songs. Paisley wrote this song with Chris DuBois. It was also Paisley's first single not to have an accompanying music video.

== Background ==
Paisley said about the song: "We had no idea at first where we were going with this song. It started out with us focusing on a guy who owns a bar. And we began with the scenario that he's there working after the bar is closed, sweeping and putting the chairs up. Then this girl comes in who's forgotten her purse. We built the rest of the song around that concept. That's my favorite way of writing a song, because you never know where it's going. You're never pigeonholed by having to get from A to B, because you don't know what B is."

== Content ==
The narrator of the song is closing a tavern (it is not specified as to whether he is a bartender or an actual owner of the tavern). An unnamed woman, who was patronizing the tavern earlier in the evening, re-enters the business and explains that she had accidentally left her purse behind. He says that he had found one and the woman claims it. They subsequently engage in conversation. The narrator informs the woman that he will only return her purse to her if she shares a dance with him, presumably to romantic music that he manages to play on the tavern's jukebox. They subsequently fall in love with each other, and the narrator plans to propose to her. When she arrives one day after the tavern is closed, he proposes to her. She accepts his proposal, but not before she returns the favor by sharing a dance with him.

== Chart performance ==
"We Danced" debuted at number 58 on the U.S. Billboard Hot Country Songs for the week of July 1, 2000.

Chart (2000–2001)	Peak Position
Canada Country Singles (RPM)	12 (Note: "We Danced" had not yet peaked when RPM ceased publication in November 2000.)
US Billboard Hot 100	29
US Hot Country Songs (Billboard)	1

=== Year-end charts ===
Chart (2000)	Position
US Country Songs (Billboard)	46

Chart (2001)	Position
US Country Songs (Billboard)	54
