= He Didn't Have to Be =

Single by Brad Paisley

from the album Who Needs Pictures
- B-side: "I've Been Better"
- Released: August 30, 1999
- Genre: Country
- Length: 4:42 (album version); 3:52 (radio edit)
- Label: Arista Nashville
- Songwriters: Brad Paisley; Kelley Lovelace
- Producer: Frank Rogers

Brad Paisley singles chronology
"Who Needs Pictures" (1999)	"He Didn't Have to Be" (1999)	"Me Neither" (2000)

"He Didn't Have to Be" is a song co-written and recorded by American country music artist Brad Paisley. It was released in August 1999 as the second single from his debut album, Who Needs Pictures. In December 1999, it became his first number one single; it held the top spot for one week.

== Background ==
The song was based on Paisley's frequent co-writer and best friend, Kelley Lovelace's stepson McCain Merren, who attended the 2000 ACM Awards as Paisley's guest. According to Lovelace, Paisley said to him, "Let's make a song about you two that will make your wife cry."

== Content ==
This song is written from the perspective of a son of a single mother. The single mother begins dating a new man who almost immediately includes the child in things like going to the movies. In the final verse, the son now is about ready to become a father himself, standing in the hospital next to his stepfather and hoping that he can be "at least half the dad" that his stepfather "didn't have to be." This song is set in the key of A major in common time, and has a vocal range from A3 to D5.

== Music video ==
The music video was directed by Deaton Flanigen and premiered on August 17, 1999 on CMT.

== Chart performance ==
"He Didn't Have to Be" debuted at number 72 on the U.S. Billboard Hot Country Songs for the week of September 4, 1999. "He Didn't Have to Be" spent 30 weeks on the Billboard Hot Country Songs, peaking at number one in December 1999 and holding that position for one week.

Chart (1999)	Peak position
Canada Country Singles (RPM)	5
US Billboard Hot 100	30
US Hot Country Songs (Billboard)	1

=== Year-end charts ===
Chart (1999)	Position
Canada Country Tracks (RPM)	51

Chart (2000)	Position
US Country Songs (Billboard)	33
