= Who Needs Pictures =

Studio album by Brad Paisley
- Released: June 1, 1999
- Studios: The Castle (Franklin, TN); Sound Stage Studios, Thelma's East and EMI Music Publishing Studios (Nashville, TN); Scrimshaw Sound (Antioch, TN).
- Genre: Country
- Length: 46:57
- Label: Arista Nashville
- Producer: Frank Rogers

Brad Paisley chronology
Who Needs Pictures (1999)	Part II (2001)

Singles from Who Needs Pictures
- 1. "Who Needs Pictures" Released: February 1, 1999; 2. "He Didn't Have to Be" Released: August 30, 1999; 3. "Me Neither" Released: February 7, 2000; 4. "We Danced" Released: June 26, 2000

Professional ratings
Review scores
Source	Rating
About.com	5/5 stars
AllMusic	4/5 stars
Christgau's Consumer Guide	(2-star Honorable Mention)
Q	3/5 stars

Who Needs Pictures is the debut studio album by American country music artist Brad Paisley. The album was released on June 1, 1999 on Arista Nashville after Paisley signed contracts in 1998. The album produced four singles on the Billboard country music charts. In order of release, they were the title track, "He Didn't Have to Be" (his first No. 1), "Me Neither", and "We Danced" (also a No. 1). The album has been certified platinum by the RIAA.

This album was repackaged with Part II by Sony's Legacy division and released on September 23, 2008.

== Track listing ==
No.	Title	Writer(s)	Length
1.	"Long Sermon"	Brad Paisley; Tim Nichols	3:18
2.	"Me Neither"	Paisley; Chris DuBois; Frank Rogers	3:19
3.	"Who Needs Pictures"	Paisley; DuBois; Rogers	3:45
4.	"Don't Breathe"	Paisley	2:53
5.	"He Didn't Have to Be"	Paisley; Kelley Lovelace	4:42
6.	"It Never Woulda Worked out Anyway"	Paisley; Lovelace	2:41
7.	"Holdin' On to You"	Paisley; DuBois; Lovelace	3:00
8.	"I've Been Better"	Paisley; Robert Arthur	4:07
9.	"We Danced"	Paisley; DuBois	3:45
10.	"Sleepin' on the Foldout"	Paisley; DuBois	3:23
11.	"Cloud of Dust"	Paisley; DuBois	4:05
12.	"The Nervous Breakdown" (instrumental)	Paisley; James Gregory; Mitch McMichen	3:29
13.	"In the Garden"	Traditional	4:30
Total length:			46:57

== Personnel ==
Musicians

- Eddie Bayers – drums
- Earl Clark – steel guitar
- Glen Duncan – mandolin, fiddle
- James Gregory – bass
- Bernie Herms – acoustic piano, Rhodes piano, Hammond B3 organ, strings
- Wes Hightower – backing vocals
- Mike Johnson – steel guitar, dobro, pedabro
- Tim Lauer – accordion
- Mitch McMichen – drums, percussion
- Brad Paisley – lead vocals, electric guitars, acoustic guitar, six string bass
- Frank Rogers – banjo
- Steve Williams – "absolutely nothing"

Production and technical staff

Credits from the album's liner notes.

- Frank Rogers - producer; engineer/recording (additional overdubs only)
- Susan Sherrill – production assistant
- John Kelton – recording (except "He Didn't Have To Be" and "Sleepin' on the Foldout"), mixing ("Long Sermon", "Who Needs Pictures", "We Danced", and "Me Neither")
- Paula Montonado – assistant engineer "He Didn't Have To Be" and "Sleepin' on the Foldout"), mix assistant ("Long Sermon", "Who Needs Pictures", "We Danced", and "Me Neither")
- Greg Droman – engineer/recording ("He Didn't Have To Be" and "Sleepin' on the Foldout")
- Mike Purcell – assistant engineer ("He Didn't Have To Be" and "Sleepin' on the Foldout"), mix assistant (except "Long Sermon", "Who Needs Pictures", "We Danced", "Me Neither", and "Don't Breathe")
- Richard Barrow – mixing (except "Long Sermon", "Who Needs Pictures", and "We Danced")
- Rich Hanson – mix assistant ("Don't Breathe")
- Brian David Willis – engineer/recording (overdubs only), digital editing
- Chris Latham – engineer/recording (additional overdubs only)
- Nathan DiGesare – engineer/recording (additional overdubs only)
- Hank Williams – mastering
- S. Wade Hunt – art direction, design
- Jim "Señor" McGuire – photography

Studios

- Recorded at The Castle Recording Studios (Franklin, TN) and Sound Stage Studios (Nashville, TN).
- Overdubs recorded at Thelma's East Studios (Nashville, TN).
- Additional overdubs recorded at Thelma's East Studios, EMI Music Publishing Studios (Nashville, TN), and Scrimshaw Sound Studios.
- Mixed at The Castle Recording Studios and Loud Recording (Nashville, TN).
- Mastered at MasterMix (Nashville, TN).

== Charts ==
=== Weekly charts ===
Chart (1999–2001)	Peak position
Canada Country Albums (RPM)	12
UK Country Albums (Official Charts)	12
US Billboard 200	102
US Top Country Albums (Billboard)	13
US Heatseekers Albums (Billboard)	4

=== Year-end charts ===
Chart (1999)	Peak position
US Top Country Albums (Billboard)	75

Chart (2000)	Peak position
US Top Country Albums (Billboard)	21

Chart (2001)	Peak position
Canadian Country Albums (Nielsen SoundScan)	92
US Top Country Albums (Billboard)	41

== Certifications ==
Region	Certification	Certified units/sales
Canada (Music Canada)	Gold	50,000^{^}
United States (RIAA)	Platinum	1,000,000^{^}
^{^} Shipments figures based on certification alone.
