= Lee Brice discography =

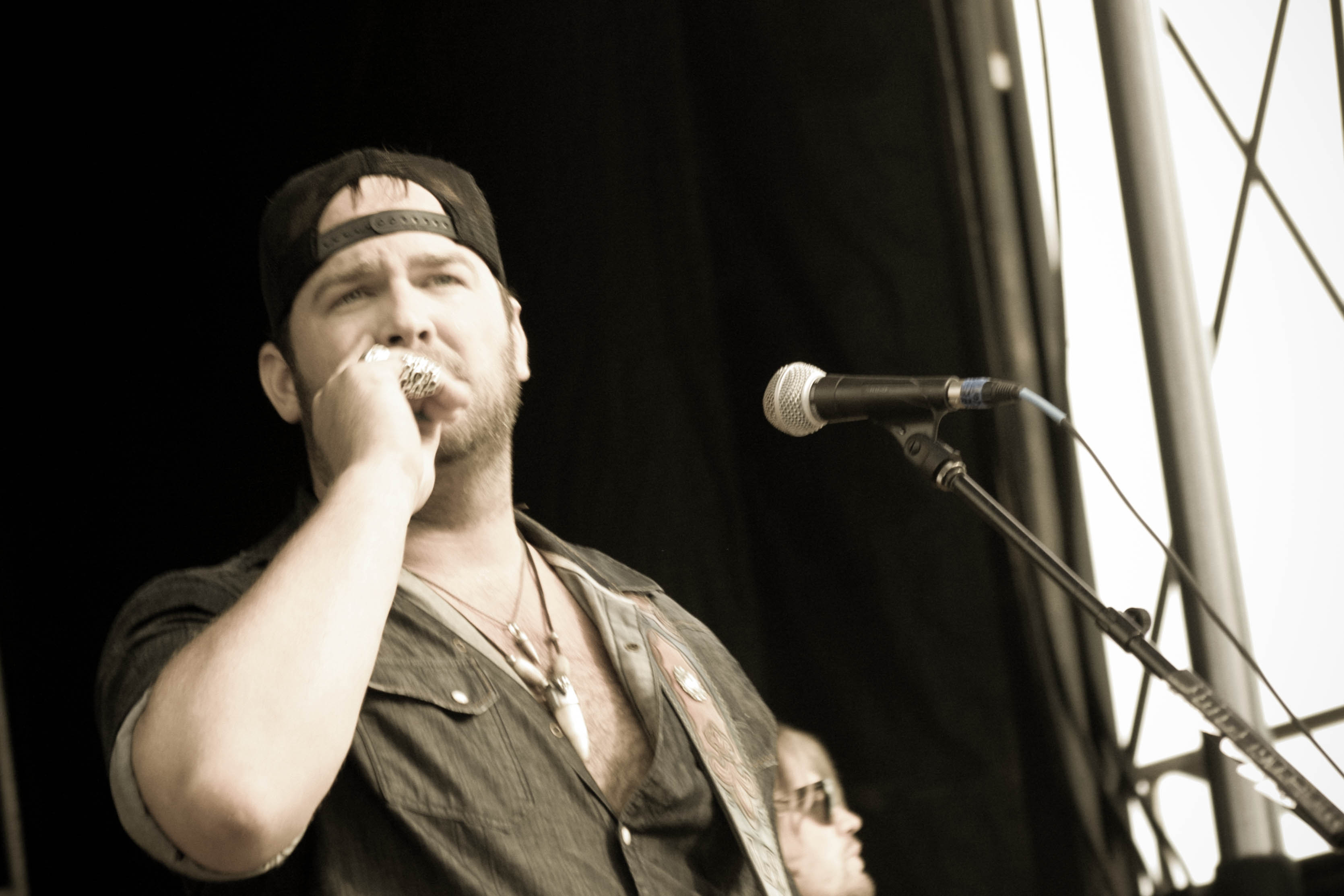
- Lee Brice at Country Throwdown Tour 2011
- Studio albums: 6
- EPs: 2
- Singles: 19
- Music videos: 14
- No. 1 singles: 8

American country music singer and songwriter Lee Brice has released five studio albums, nineteen singles and fourteen music videos.

== Studio albums ==
Title	Album details	Peaks				Sales	Certifications
Title	Album details	US	US Cou.	AUS	CAN	Sales	Certifications
Love Like Crazy	Release date: June 8, 2010; Label: Curb	44	9	—	—	US: 32,000	RIAA: Gold
Hard 2 Love	Release date: April 24, 2012; Label: Curb	5	2	—	—	US: 471,000	RIAA: 2× Platinum
I Don't Dance	Release date: September 9, 2014; Label: Curb	5	1	70	5	US: 247,400	RIAA: Platinum
Lee Brice	Release date: November 3, 2017; Label: Curb	36	7	99	—	US: 49,600	RIAA: Gold
Hey World	Release date: November 20, 2020; Label: Curb	45	8	—	—		RIAA: Platinum
Sunriser	Release date: October 2, 2026; Label: Curb	To be released					
"—" denotes releases that did not chart

== Extended plays ==
Title	EP details	Peaks		Sales
Title	EP details	US Cou.	US Heat.	Sales
Love Like Crazy	Release date: February 2, 2010; Label: Asylum-Curb; Formats: Digital download	56	46	
Mixtape: 'Til Summer's Gone	Release date: July 17, 2015; Label: Curb; Formats: Digital download	18	—	US: 2,800
"—" denotes releases that did not chart

== Singles ==
Title	Year	Peak chart positions						Certifications	Album
Title	Year	US	US Country Songs	US Country Airplay	US AC	CAN	CAN Country	Certifications	Album
"She Ain't Right"	2007	—	29		—	—	—		Picture of Me
"Happy Endings"	2007	—	32		—	—	—		Picture of Me
"Upper Middle Class White Trash"	2008	—	44		—	—	—		Picture of Me
"Love Like Crazy"	2009	45	3		—	77	11	RIAA: 2× Platinum	Love Like Crazy
"Beautiful Every Time"	2010	—	30		—	—	—		Love Like Crazy
"A Woman Like You"	2011	33	1		—	49	3	RIAA: 3× Platinum; MC: Platinum	Hard 2 Love
"Hard to Love"	2012	27	4	1	—	51	2	RIAA: 5× Platinum; MC: Platinum	Hard 2 Love
"I Drive Your Truck"	2012	47	6	1	—	53	3	RIAA: 2× Platinum; MC: Gold	Hard 2 Love
"Parking Lot Party"	2013	62	11	6	—	79	8	RIAA: Platinum; MC: Gold	Hard 2 Love
"I Don't Dance"	2014	33	5	1	—	40	3	RIAA: 4× Platinum; MC: Gold	I Don't Dance
"Drinking Class"	2014	53	3	2	—	66	11	RIAA: 2× Platinum	I Don't Dance
"That Don't Sound Like You"	2015	64	13	10	—	75	38	RIAA: Platinum	I Don't Dance
"A Little More Love" (with Jerrod Niemann)	2016	—	41	28	—	—	—		This Ride
"Boy"	2017	94	14	16	—	—	50	RIAA: 2× Platinum	Lee Brice
"Rumor"	2018	25	2	1	18	61	11	RIAA: 6× Platinum; RMNZ: Gold	Lee Brice
"I Hope You're Happy Now" (with Carly Pearce)	2019	27	5	1	—	51	1	RIAA: 3× Platinum; MC: 3× Platinum	Carly Pearce
"One of Them Girls"	2020	17	2	1	—	24	1	RIAA: 5× Platinum; BPI: Silver; RMNZ: Platinum	Hey World
"Memory I Don't Mess With"	2020	33	5	1	—	65	1	RIAA: 2× Platinum	Hey World
"Soul"	2021	83	20	19	—	30	2	RIAA: Platinum	Hey World
"Save the Roses"	2023	—	—	59	—	—	—		Hey World
"Drinkin' Buddies" (featuring Nate Smith and Hailey Whitters)	2024	—	—	26	—	—	59		Sunriser
"Cry"	2025	—	—	48	—	—	—		Sunriser
"Killed the Man"	2025	—	—	44	—	—	45		Sunriser
"—" denotes releases that did not chart

== Other singles ==
=== Promotional singles ===
Title	Year	Peak chart positions	Album
Title	Year	US Christ.	Album
"Four on the Floor"	2008	—	Picture of Me
"Orange Empire"	2012	—	Non-album singles
"Santa Claus Was My Uber Driver"	2022	—	Non-album singles
"Country Nowadays"	2026	—	Sunriser
"When the Kingdom Comes"	2026	50	Sunriser
"—" denotes releases that did not chart

=== Featured singles ===
Title	Year	Album
"How Do You Love" (Cheat Codes with Lee Brice and Lindsay Ell)	2021	One Night in Nashville

== Other charted songs ==
Title	Year	Peak chart positions			Album
Title	Year	US Country Songs	US Country Airplay	CAN	Album
"Girls in Bikinis"	2014	32	—	67	I Don't Dance
"Good Man"	2014	43	—	76	I Don't Dance
"Rumor" (Glover Mix)	2020	—	48	—	—N/a
"—" denotes releases that did not chart

== Music videos ==
Year	Video	Director
2007	"She Ain't Right"	Eric Welch
2010	"Love Like Crazy"	Eric Welch
2011	"Beautiful Every Time"	Eric Welch
2011	"A Woman Like You"	Eric Welch
2012	"Hard to Love"	Eric Welch
2012	"I Drive Your Truck"	Eric Welch
2014	"I Don't Dance"	Spidey Smith
2014	"Drinking Class"	Spidey Smith
2015	"That Don't Sound Like You"	Spidey Smith
2016	"A Little More Love" (with Jerrod Niemann)	Chase Lauer
2017	"Boy"	Spidey Smith
2017	"Rumor"	
2019	"I Hope You're Happy Now" (with Carly Pearce)	Sam Siske
2020	"One of Them Girls"	Steven T. Miller
2020	"Memory I Don’t Mess With"	Eric Welch
2025	"Cry"	Chase Lauer
