= List of Billboard number-one country songs of 2012 =

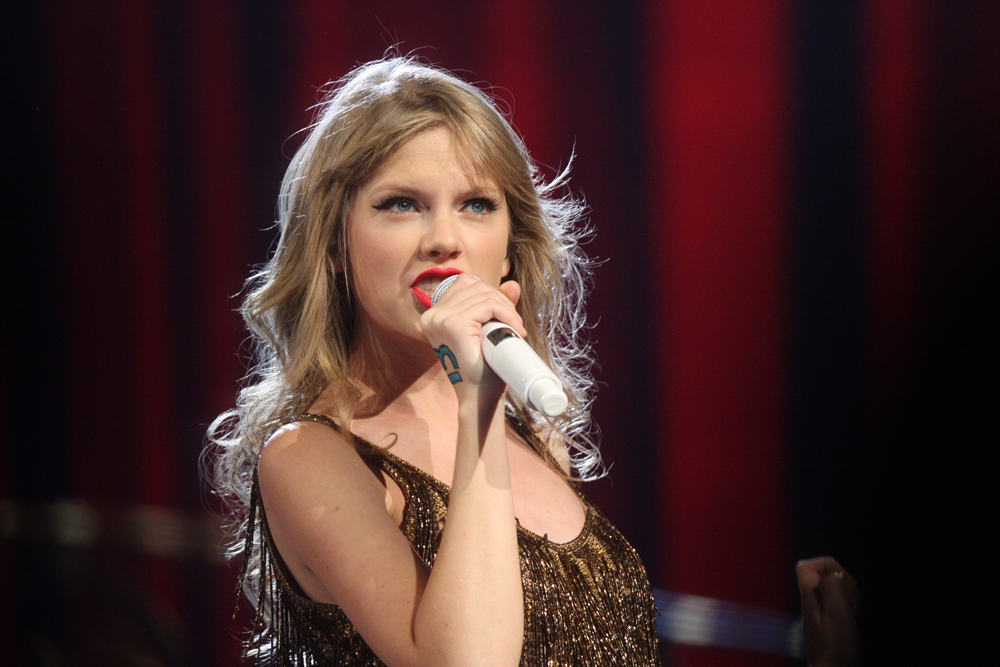
The change in methodology of the Hot Country Songs chart enabled Taylor Swift's song "We Are Never Ever Getting Back Together" to rise twenty places to number one and spend nine consecutive weeks in the top spot, a record-breaking run for a solo female singer.

Hot Country Songs and Country Airplay are charts that rank the top-performing country music songs in the United States, published by Billboard magazine. At the start of 2012, Hot Country Songs ranked songs based on weekly airplay data from country music radio stations compiled by Nielsen Broadcast Data Systems. With effect from the issue dated October 20, 2012, however, the magazine significantly altered the methodology of this chart, incorporating digital downloads, streaming, and airplay not only from country stations but from stations of all formats. These changes were controversial, as some critics felt that they unduly benefited acts with crossover appeal, as opposed to those whose songs were played only on country stations. At the same time, Billboard launched the new Country Airplay listing, which used the methodology of ranking tracks based solely on country radio airplay. Although this chart was published for the first time in 2012, Billboard retrospectively considers the period since Hot Country Songs began using Nielsen data in 1990 to also form part of the history of the Country Airplay listing.

An immediate beneficiary of the change in methodology for the Hot Country Songs chart was Taylor Swift. In the first week of the new system, her song "We Are Never Ever Getting Back Together", which had been falling down the chart and had been at number 21 the previous week based on country radio airplay alone, rose straight to number one when streaming, downloads, and plays on other radio formats began to be counted. Swift's song would remain in the top spot for nine consecutive weeks, breaking the record for the longest unbroken run at number one by a female singer held since 1965 by Connie Smith's "Once a Day". Based on country radio airplay alone, however, Swift's song dropped even further to number 36 on the first published Country Airplay chart, the same week that it jumped to number one on Hot Country Songs. The song's greater popularity on pop music radio than country stations highlighted Swift's increasing move away from the country genre.

After Swift's nine weeks in the top spot, the second highest total number of weeks at number one on Hot Country Songs was four. This was achieved by Blake Shelton, who was one of six acts to have two number ones during the year. Several acts had their first chart-toppers in 2012. In January, "Let It Rain" by David Nail featuring Sarah Buxton spent a single week in the top spot, becoming the first number one for both singers. The following week Eric Church achieved his first chart-topper with "Drink in My Hand". In April "A Woman Like You" gave Lee Brice his first number one, and in June Kip Moore achieved the same feat with "Somethin' 'Bout a Truck". At the end of August, Love and Theft reached number one for the first time with "Angel Eyes", as did Little Big Town three weeks later with "Pontoon". In the issue of Billboard dated September 29, Hunter Hayes gained his first chart-topper with "Wanted", with which the 21-year old gained the distinction of being the youngest solo male artist to have a number-one country song. The final act to gain a first-time chart-topper in 2012 was Florida Georgia Line, whose debut single, "Cruise", held the peak position on both charts in the last issue of Billboard of the year. The track would go on to become the best-selling country digital single to date and set a new record for the most weeks spent at number one on the Hot Country Songs chart.

== Chart history ==
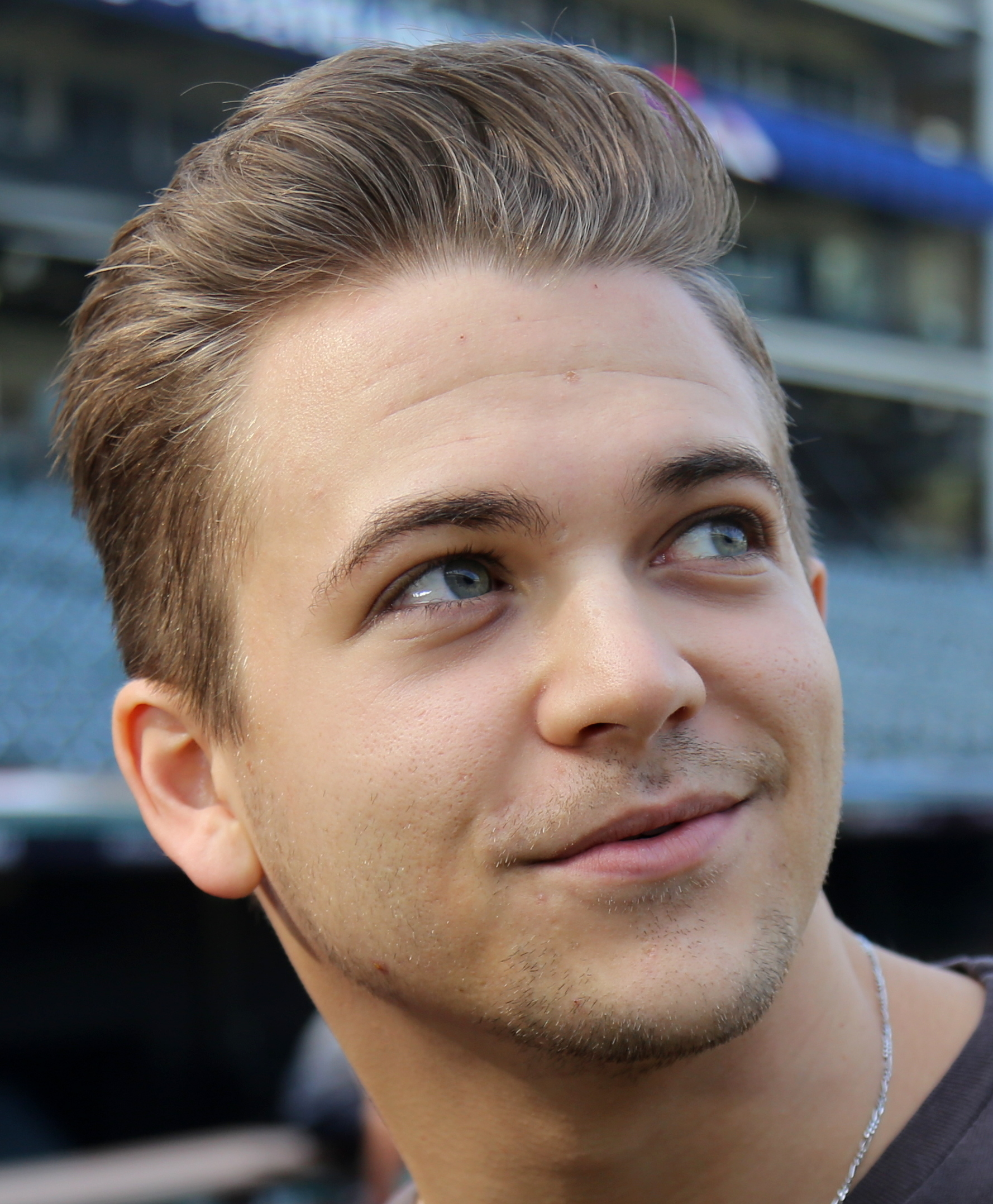
Hunter Hayes became the youngest solo male artist to have a number-one country song when "Wanted" topped the Hot Country Songs chart in September.

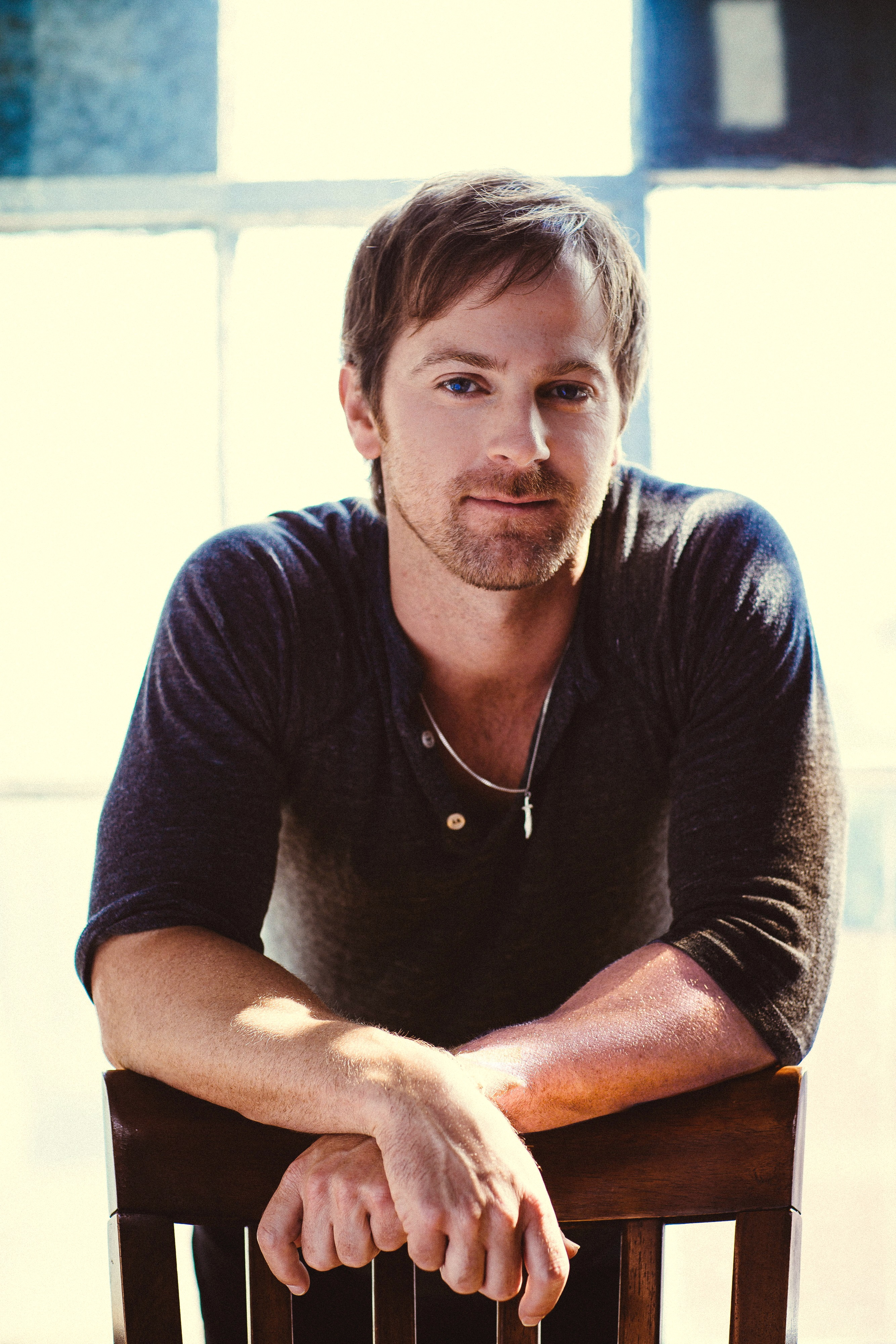
Kip Moore achieved his first number one with "Somethin' 'Bout a Truck".

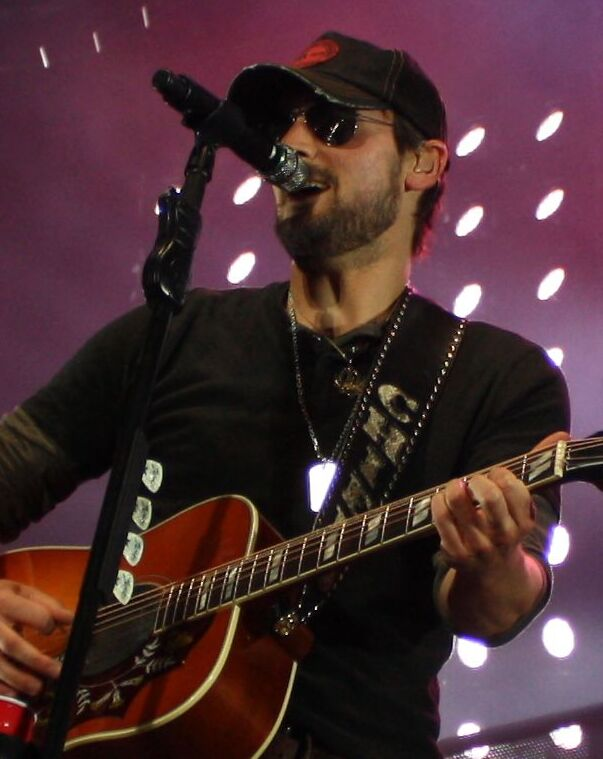
Eric Church was one of several acts to gain two Hot Country Songs number ones in 2012.

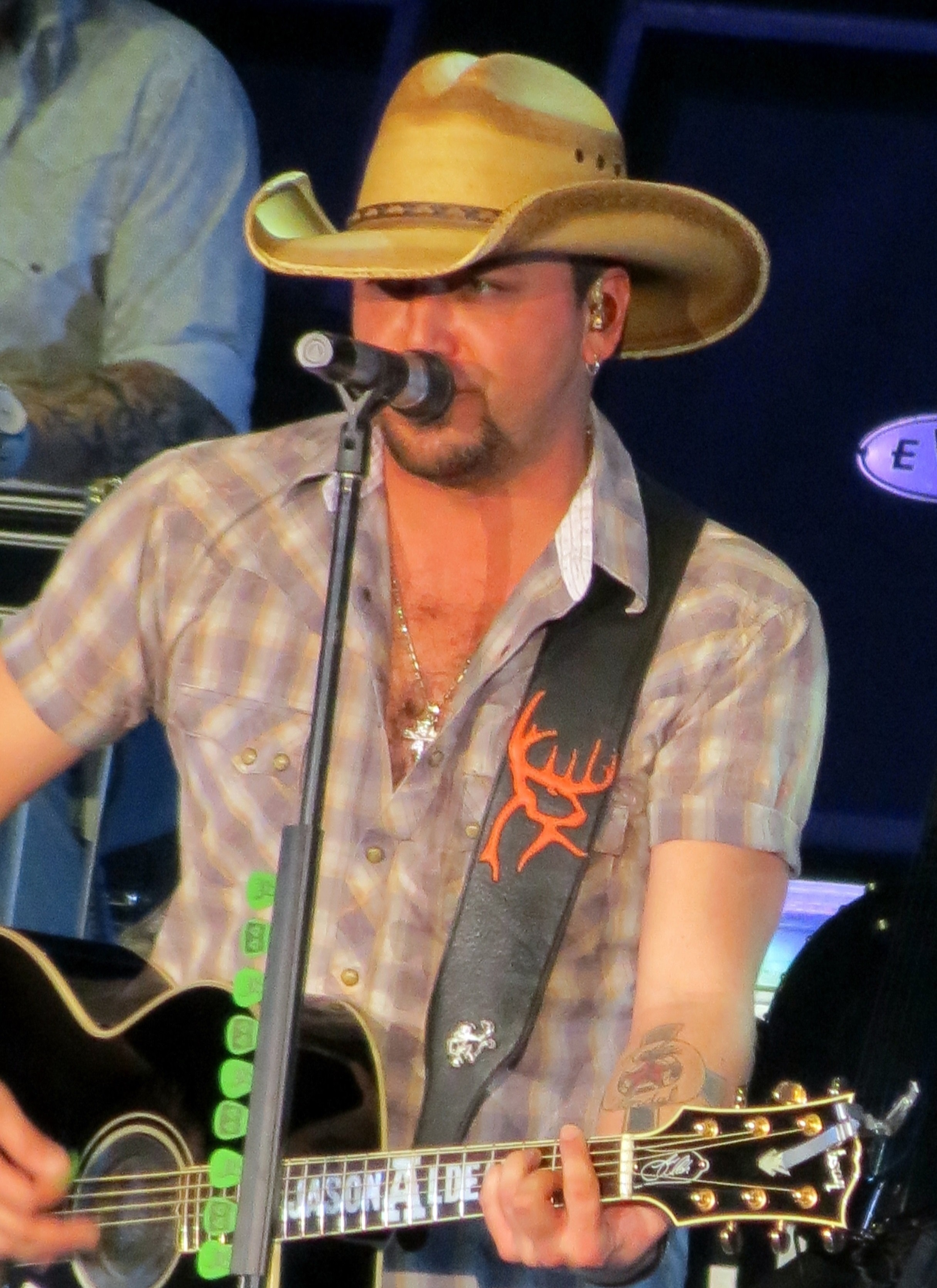
Jason Aldean's "Take a Little Ride" was at number one on the first Country Airplay chart to be published.

Chart history
Issue date	Hot Country Songs			Country Airplay		
Issue date	Title	Artist(s)	Ref.	Title	Artist(s)	Ref.
January 7	"Keep Me in Mind"	Zac Brown Band		—N/a		
January 14	"Keep Me in Mind"	Zac Brown Band		—N/a		
January 21	"Let It Rain"	David Nail featuring Sarah Buxton		—N/a		
January 28	"Drink in My Hand"	Eric Church		—N/a		
February 4	"I Don't Want This Night to End"	Luke Bryan		—N/a		
February 11	"You"	Chris Young		—N/a		
February 18	"All Your Life"	The Band Perry		—N/a		
February 25	"All Your Life"	The Band Perry		—N/a		
March 3	"You Gonna Fly"	Keith Urban		—N/a		
March 10	"You Gonna Fly"	Keith Urban		—N/a		
March 17	"Reality"	Kenny Chesney		—N/a		
March 24	"Home"	Dierks Bentley		—N/a		
March 31	"Ours"	Taylor Swift		—N/a		
April 7	"Alone with You"	Jake Owen		—N/a		
April 14	"Alone with You"	Jake Owen		—N/a		
April 21	"A Woman Like You"	Lee Brice		—N/a		
April 28	"Drink on It"	Blake Shelton		—N/a		
May 5	"Drink on It"	Blake Shelton		—N/a		
May 12	"Banjo"	Rascal Flatts		—N/a		
May 19	"Over You"	Miranda Lambert		—N/a		
May 26	"Fly Over States"	Jason Aldean		—N/a		
June 2	"Somethin' 'Bout a Truck"	Kip Moore		—N/a		
June 9	"Somethin' 'Bout a Truck"	Kip Moore		—N/a		
June 16	"Good Girl"	Carrie Underwood		—N/a		
June 23	"Springsteen"	Eric Church		—N/a		
June 30	"Springsteen"	Eric Church		—N/a		
July 7	"Drunk on You"	Luke Bryan		—N/a		
July 14	"Drunk on You"	Luke Bryan		—N/a		
July 21	"You Don't Know Her Like I Do"	Brantley Gilbert		—N/a		
July 28	"Even If It Breaks Your Heart"	Eli Young Band		—N/a		
August 4	"5-1-5-0"	Dierks Bentley		—N/a		
August 11	"Come Over"	Kenny Chesney		—N/a		
August 18	"Come Over"	Kenny Chesney		—N/a		
August 25	"Angel Eyes"	Love and Theft		—N/a		
September 1	"Over"	Blake Shelton		—N/a		
September 8	"Over"	Blake Shelton		—N/a		
September 15	"Pontoon"	Little Big Town		—N/a		
September 22	"Pontoon"	Little Big Town		—N/a		
September 29	"Wanted"	Hunter Hayes		—N/a		
October 6	"Take a Little Ride"	Jason Aldean		—N/a		
October 13	"Take a Little Ride"	Jason Aldean		—N/a		
October 20	"We Are Never Ever Getting Back Together"	Taylor Swift		"Take a Little Ride"	Jason Aldean	
October 27	"We Are Never Ever Getting Back Together"	Taylor Swift		"Blown Away"	Carrie Underwood	
November 3	"We Are Never Ever Getting Back Together"	Taylor Swift		"Blown Away"	Carrie Underwood	
November 10	"We Are Never Ever Getting Back Together"	Taylor Swift		"Hard to Love"	Lee Brice	
November 17	"We Are Never Ever Getting Back Together"	Taylor Swift		"Hard to Love"	Lee Brice	
November 24	"We Are Never Ever Getting Back Together"	Taylor Swift		"Kiss Tomorrow Goodbye"	Luke Bryan	
December 1	"We Are Never Ever Getting Back Together"	Taylor Swift		"Kiss Tomorrow Goodbye"	Luke Bryan	
December 8	"We Are Never Ever Getting Back Together"	Taylor Swift		"The One That Got Away"	Jake Owen	
December 15	"We Are Never Ever Getting Back Together"	Taylor Swift		"Cruise"	Florida Georgia Line	
December 22	"Cruise"	Florida Georgia Line		"Cruise"	Florida Georgia Line	
December 29	"Cruise"	Florida Georgia Line		"Cruise"	Florida Georgia Line	

== See also ==
- 2012 in country music
- List of artists who reached number one on the U.S. country chart
- List of Top Country Albums number ones of 2012
