= All-American Halftime Show =

Counterprogramming to the Super Bowl LX halftime show

- Concert by Turning Point USA
- Promotional poster
- Venue: Private venue, Atlanta, Georgia, United States
- Date: February 8, 2026
- Duration: 36:20
- Supporting act: Spencer Waasdorp
- Website: www.americanhalftimeshow.com

Turning Point USA concert chronology
- N/A; All-American Halftime Show (2026)
Kid Rock tour chronology
| Rock the Country (2025) | All-American Halftime Show (2026) | Freedom 250 Tour (2026) |
Gabby Barrett tour chronology
| Life I'm Living Tour (2025) | All-American Halftime Show (2026) |
Lee Brice tour chronology
| What You Know About That (2025) | All-American Halftime Show (2026) | Sunrise Tour (2026) |
Brantley Gilbert tour chronology
| The Tattoos Tour 2025 (2025-2026) | All-American Halftime Show (2026) | The Tattoos Tour 2026 (2026) |

The All-American Halftime Show (also styled as The All American Halftime Show) was a 2026 online concert produced by Turning Point USA (TPUSA). It was announced as an alternative to the Super Bowl LX halftime show headlined by Puerto Rican artist Bad Bunny, and streamed at the same time as the official halftime broadcast on February 8, 2026.

Reviews for the event were mixed, ranging from mildly positive to harshly negative. Public scrutiny focused heavily on Kid Rock, whose performance was widely derided after viewers perceived apparent lip syncing problems during the song "Bawitdaba", which were caused by a combination of network lag and the failure to show Paradime, who performed some of the rap sections of "Bawitdaba" as he normally does during Kid Rock's live performances. Based on publicly available metrics from its online carriers and comparisons to the Nielsen ratings of the Super Bowl and its halftime show (Nielsen did not measure the viewership of the All-American Halftime Show itself), the show drew several million viewers live.

== Background ==
On September 20, 2025, Puerto Rican rapper Bad Bunny was officially announced as the headliner for the Apple Music Super Bowl LX Halftime Show by the National Football League (NFL) in partnership with Apple Music and Jay-Z's Roc Nation. On October 9, 2025, Turning Point USA (TPUSA) announced that it would host the All-American Halftime Show as an alternative, describing it as an entertainment option celebrating "American culture, freedom, and faith", aimed at audiences seeking an alternative. TPUSA spokesperson Andrew Kolvet said that the event had "no other agenda than faith, family, and freedom". Organizers announced a lineup featuring performers such as Kid Rock, Lee Brice, Brantley Gilbert, and Gabby Barrett. The show was scheduled to stream concurrently with the Super Bowl LX halftime broadcast at around 8 p.m. Eastern time, with the broadcast starting at 7:30 p.m. on various online platforms and broadcast partners, including social media channels and conservative media outlets.

The official website state that it could be viewed on Sinclair Broadcast Group's Charge! and The National News Desk, DailyWire+, Trinity Broadcasting Network, Real America's Voice, One America News Network, and NTD America, along with authorized free streams on TPUSA's official YouTube and Rumble accounts. An attempt to simulcast the feed via X was halted shortly before it began due to what TPUSA dubbed "licensing restrictions".

== Performance ==
The performance was pre-taped in Atlanta, Georgia, in a studio with about 200 people in the audience. Prior to the performances, a video of Secretary of Defense Pete Hegseth was played to open the performance referencing the department's support for the performances and the 250th anniversary of the United States.

The concert began with an electric guitar rendition of "The Star-Spangled Banner" by Spencer "Chuck Hollywood" Waasdorp, Gilbert's guitarist. Gilbert then played "Real American" and "Dirt Road Anthem," remarking before the latter about the song being his breakthrough hit when Jason Aldean covered it. Barrett followed, with her hits "I Hope" and "The Good Ones." Brice came next; after singing his hit "Drinking Class," he remarked that Turning Point USA had brought him in to say what was on his mind and debuted the most politically charged song of the night, "Country Nowadays." Brice closed his set with his hit "Hard to Love." An announcer then introduced Kid Rock, who performed his nu metal hit "Bawitdaba." At the end of "Bawitdaba," the tone shifted as a cello and violin duo took center stage. Following their interlude, Kid Rock was reintroduced as his birth name, Robert Ritchie, and performed a cover of the Cody Johnson hit "'Til You Can't," along with a new verse. The contrast between the two was noted by several conservative commentators as resembling a redemption arc/rebranding for Kid Rock.

After his performance, Kid Rock quoted the song he had just sung, saying "...can give your life to Jesus and he'll give you a second chance. 'Til you can't" The show closed with a slideshow tribute to TPUSA founder Charlie Kirk, who was assassinated five months prior to the performance, followed by the Bible verse Isaiah 6:8: "Here am I, send me."

=== Set list ===
- Spencer Waasdorp – "The Star-Spangled Banner", played on electric guitar
- Brantley Gilbert – "Real American" and "Dirt Road Anthem"
- Gabby Barrett – "I Hope" and "The Good Ones"
- Lee Brice – "Drinking Class", "Country Nowadays", "Hard to Love"
- Kid Rock feat. Paradime – "Bawitdaba"
- Antonio and Allison Marin – Cello and violin interlude
- Kid Rock (billed as Robert Ritchie) – "'Til You Can't"

== Reception ==
In the days before the Super Bowl, the White House press secretary, Karoline Leavitt, said of Donald Trump, "I think the president would much prefer a Kid Rock performance over Bad Bunny." Trump instead watched the official halftime show and gave a scathing review on Truth Social.

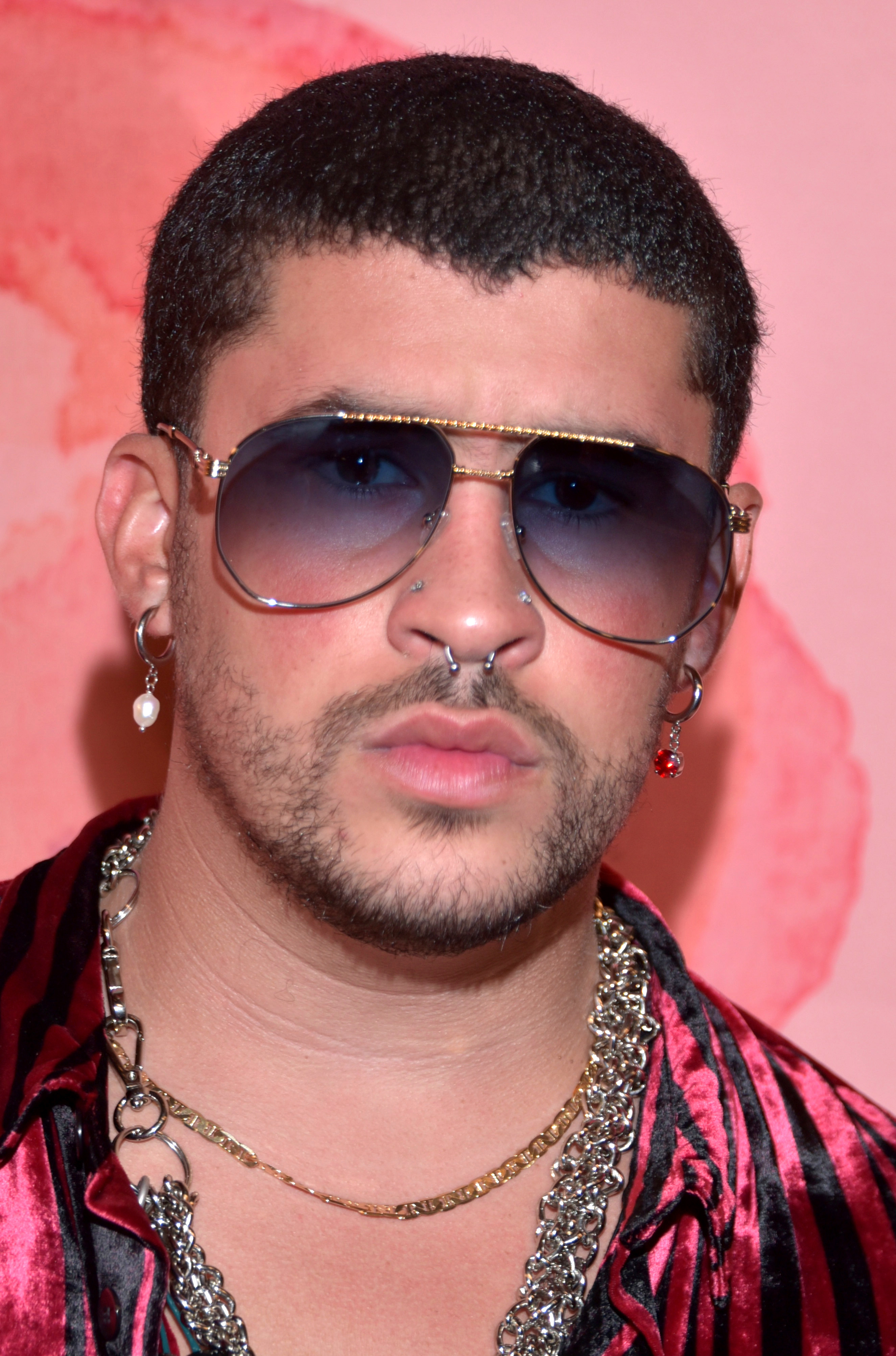
Bad Bunny, the headliner of the official Super Bowl halftime show

YouGov assessed that 35% of Americans were more interested in viewing Bad Bunny's halftime show, whereas 28% were more interested in the All-American Halftime Show, with most Democrats preferring the official show (63% to 7%) and a majority of Republicans favoring TPUSA's show (55% to 13%). The All-American Halftime Show received as many as 6.1 million concurrent viewers on TPUSA's YouTube channel.

In her recap for Billboard, Melinda Newman summarized the performance as "a respectful, enjoyable presentation that, as Kid Rock had promised, appealed to the conservative base", viewing Brice's song as the most political moment of the event. Newman felt that the show "undoubtedly didn't go far right enough" for Make America Great Again supporters and likely Trump himself, whereas the far left would be unable to ridicule any moments aside from the performers involved. Concluding her recap, Newman wrote: "It was a solid 15-minute presentation. They played it safe and sometimes that's ok."

Writing for Variety, Chris Willman noted an absence of mentions of Bad Bunny, concluding: "Rather than come off as a protest event, the 35-minute program offered a set of mild, largely non-political performances that could have been mistaken for a vintage CMT or Nashville Network special—even from Kid Rock, who was on his very best behavior during a quick two-song appearance. William Earl, also of Variety, was much more critical of the event, which he derided as "a slapdash night of music that seemed half-hearted from the start", concluding: "Unfortunately, the All-American Halftime Show was unable to evoke much more than a shrug, with halfhearted pop-country performances that showed the limitations of booking a big show with minimal talent." Earl unfavorably compared the event to Bad Bunny's halftime show, noting that whereas Bad Bunny's performance concluded with the message "The only thing more powerful than hate is love", TPUSA's broadcast ended with the words "Get involved" and a QR code asking for money.

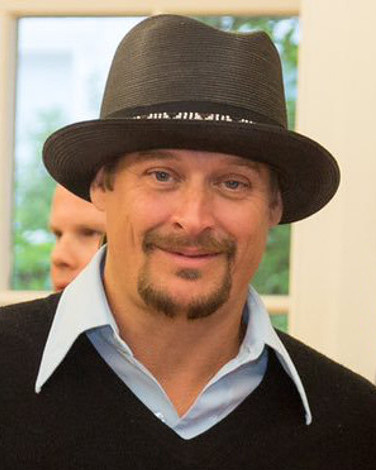
Kid Rock at the White House in April 2017

Reviewing the show for The Hollywood Reporter, Ethan Millman said the performers "delivered nearly half an hour of religiously charged, star-spangled country music veering on jingoism and cringe." Millman noted that as the Super Bowl is the most-viewed television event of the year, and Bad Bunny has 90.5 million Spotify listeners to Kid Rock's 5.3 million, the idea that the All-American Halftime Show could rival the Super Bowl was "dubious at best."

Miles Klee of Wired opined that "TPUSA's star-spangled jamboree wasn't particularly message-driven nor even provocative", as well as noting that the release of millions of Epstein files prior to the show led to the resurfacing of lyrics in Kid Rock's 1997 song "Cool, Daddy Cool" about having sex with underage girls. Vanity Fair labeled the show "exceptionally boring", calling it "a spectacular failure" even when viewed as "a 35 minute ad for Turning Point USA" and noting that none of the prominent voices expected to champion the event like Trump made any mention of it. Billy Dukes of Taste of Country gave a mostly positive review, stating that the production was largely competent other than a brief moment when video and audio desynchronized (which the reviewer attributed to Internet-related issues and high demand) and the content was mostly noncontroversial.

Some observers criticized the performance of Kid Rock, with commentators and social media users questioning whether he was lip syncing portions of his set. Close-up footage suggested a lack of synchronization between his mouth movements and the recorded audio, and was noted by Billboard, Mediaite, Consequence, and The Daily Beast. In an interview with Laura Ingraham after the Super Bowl, Kid Rock said that he told the production crew, "You guys gotta work on that sync, it's off." He stated that portions of the rap section of "Bawitdaba" were performed by his DJ, Paradime, so that he could catch his breath (as the song has always been done), but that cameras failed to show Paradime's face, making it look as if he had given up on keeping in sync.

Lee Brice received mixed attention for his original song "Country Nowadays", due to it containing lyrics critical of the transgender community. In response to the lyric, Brice stated on the radio show Big D and Bubba that he "was never out to hurt anyone". The song also resulted in the Internet meme "I just wanna kiss my fish", a mondegreen of its opening lyric "I just wanna catch my fish." In response to this, Brice began selling hats with the phrase "kiss my fish" on them.

=== Viewership ===
The show garnered a peak viewership of at least 6.4 million on YouTube and Rumble combined, during the original broadcast. Nielsen did not measure viewership of the All-American show. Nielsen ratings for the official halftime show by Bad Bunny indicated 128.2 million viewers during the same time period, making it the fourth-highest rated Super Bowl halftime show, with the Super Bowl telecast peaking at 137.8 million viewers during the last 15 minutes of the second quarter leading into halftime. Over subsequent days, there were over 21 million additional views on YouTube of the alternative show, and over 61 million additional views of the Bad Bunny show. Kid Rock stated before the show that it would have been unrealistic to expect to outperform the official Super Bowl halftime, saying: "We're approaching this show like David and Goliath. Competing with the pro football machine and a global pop superstar is almost impossible... or is it?" Former TPUSA communications director Candace Owens accused her former employer, without evidence, of "paying platform advertisers, followed by influencers" to inflate the show's viewership totals. Turning Point USA spokesman Andrew Kolvet considered the show to be a success and stated that there would be a second such halftime counterprogram against Super Bowl LXI.
