= Upper Middle Class White Trash =

Single by Lee Brice

from the album Picture of Me
- Released: July 8, 2008
- Genre: Country
- Length: 3:36
- Label: Asylum-Curb
- Songwriter(s): Lee Brice; Jon McElroy
- Producer(s): Doug Johnson

Lee Brice singles chronology
"Happy Endings" (2007)	"Upper Middle Class White Trash" (2008)	"Love Like Crazy" (2009)

"Upper Middle Class White Trash" is a song recorded by American country music artist Lee Brice. It was released in July 2008 alongside Four on the Floor as the third single from his EP, Picture of Me.

== Critical reception ==
Matt Bjorke of Roughstock gave the song a mixed review, saying that

The writer of Garth Brooks’ #1 hit “More Than a Memory” sells himself a bit short going for honky-tonk humor above a song that dares to reveal society’s judgments on class. Three verses basically chronicle the “ah-ha!” value of Five Man Electrical Band/Tesla’s “Signs” and crutch the “white trash” banner as a reason to exploit the audience on this appealing, but predictable tune that was better on television four decades ago than as a rushed single in 2008."

== Chart performance ==
Chart (2008)	Peak position
US Hot Country Songs (Billboard)	44

== See also ==
- White trash
- Upper middle class in the United States
