= Soul (song) =

Single by Lee Brice

from the album Hey World
- Released: November 29, 2021
- Genre: Country
- Length: 2:47
- Label: Curb
- Songwriters: Kevin Kadish; Tony Ferrari
- Producers: Lee Brice; Kyle Jacobs; Ben Glover

Lee Brice singles chronology
"Memory I Don't Mess With" (2020)	"Soul" (2021)	"Save the Roses" (2023)

"Soul" is a song written by Kevin Kadish and Tony Ferrari, and recorded by American country music singer Lee Brice. It was released on November 29, 2021, as the third single from Brice's fifth studio album Hey World.

== Content ==
Kevin Kadish and Tony Ferrari wrote "Soul" in 2020. The song was described by Taste of Country writer Billy Dukes as having a "sweet melody and sexy sentiment". Dukes also noted how the writers altered the word "toes" to "toeses" to make it fit the song's rhyme scheme. Morgan Raum of Country Now stated that the song had an "upbeat melody and extremely catchy chorus".

In January 2022, Brice released the song's music video, directed by Justin Clough and Chase Lauer.

The song was certified Platinum by the Recording Industry Association of America (RIAA) in August 2023, honoring 1,000,000 certified downloads.

== Chart performance ==
=== Weekly charts ===
Weekly chart performance for "Soul"
Chart (2021–2022)	Peak position
Canada Hot 100 (Billboard)	30
Canada Country (Billboard)	2
US Billboard Hot 100	83
US Country Airplay (Billboard)	19
US Hot Country Songs (Billboard)	20

=== Year-end charts ===
2022 year-end chart performance for "Soul"
Chart (2022)	Position
Canada (Canadian Hot 100)	81
US Country Airplay (Billboard)	59
US Hot Country Songs (Billboard)	45

== Certifications ==
Region	Certification	Certified units/sales
United States (RIAA)	Platinum	1,000,000^{‡}
^{‡} Sales+streaming figures based on certification alone.
