= We Are Never Ever Getting Back Together =

2012 single by Taylor Swift

Single by Taylor Swift

from the album Red
- Released: August 13, 2012
- Studio: Conway Recording (Los Angeles); MXM (Stockholm)
- Genre: Bubblegum pop; dance-pop; electro-folk; electropop; Europop; pop-punk; pop rock
- Length: 3:12
- Label: Big Machine
- Songwriters: Taylor Swift; Max Martin; Shellback
- Producers: Max Martin; Shellback; Taylor Swift (Note: Red's liner notes credit Martin and Shellback as producers, but Swift is credited as a producer in a list by the Recording Academy announcing nominees for the Grammy Award for Record of the Year at the 55th Annual Grammy Awards.)

Taylor Swift singles chronology
"Both of Us" (2012)	"We Are Never Ever Getting Back Together" (2012)	"Ronan" (2012)

Music video
- "We Are Never Ever Getting Back Together" on YouTube

"We Are Never Ever Getting Back Together" is a song by the American singer-songwriter Taylor Swift from her fourth studio album, Red (2012). It was released as the album's lead single on August 13, 2012, by Big Machine Records. Written and produced by Swift, Max Martin, and Shellback, "We Are Never Ever Getting Back Together" is an upbeat pop song that features synthesizers, twangy processed guitar riffs, bass drums, and a spoken-word bridge. Its lyrics express Swift's frustration with an ex-lover who wants to rekindle their relationship and her affirmation that they are over. An alternate version was released to US country radio on August 21, 2012.

Music critics were divided over "We Are Never Ever Getting Back Together"; those who praised the track deemed its melody catchy and radio-friendly, and those who criticized it described the sound as overtly commercial and its lyrics subpar, contrasting it with Swift's early country songs. The song appeared in year-end lists by Rolling Stone, Time, and The Village Voice. On the US Billboard Hot 100, it debuted at number 72 and rose to number one the following week, registering one of the biggest single-week jumps in chart history. The single also spent a record-breaking nine consecutive weeks at number one on the US Hot Country Songs chart and reached number one in Canada and New Zealand, as well as the top five in Australia, Ireland, Japan, and the United Kingdom. It has received multi-platinum certifications in Australia, Brazil, Japan, New Zealand, the United Kingdom, and the United States.

The music video for the song was released on August 30, 2012. It depicts Swift breaking up with an ex-boyfriend in a sarcastic and cheerful manner, supported by band members dressed in animal costumes. "We Are Never Ever Getting Back Together" won a Billboard Music Award for Top Country Song and was nominated for Record of the Year at the 2013 Grammy Awards, Video of the Year at the 2013 CMT Music Awards, and Favorite Song at the 2013 People's Choice Awards. Swift has performed the song on four of her world tours, from the Red Tour (2013–2014) to the Eras Tour (2023–2024). A re-recorded version of the song, "We Are Never Ever Getting Back Together (Taylor's Version)", was released as part of her 2021 re-recorded album Red (Taylor's Version).

== Background and release ==
Taylor Swift continued working with longtime collaborator Nathan Chapman on her third studio album, Speak Now (2010). For her next studio album, Red, Swift wanted to collaborate with new pop and rock producers, hoping to expand beyond the country pop sound that had informed her previous albums. Among the new producers were Max Martin and Shellback, two Swedish producers known for their chart-topping pop songs.

Swift wrote three songs for Red with Martin and Shellback, including "We Are Never Ever Getting Back Together", which was produced by the three. When the three were in the studio, a friend of Swift visited and told her that she heard Swift and an ex-boyfriend were reconciling, which Swift refused. When the friend left, Swift told Martin and Shellback that they were not getting back together. She strummed an acoustic guitar and improvised the refrain, "We are never ever...", asking Martin and Shellback, "Is that too obvious?" The producers built on that idea and finished the song in 25 minutes. The song was recorded at Conway Recording Studios in Los Angeles and MXM Studios in Stockholm.

The track served as Red's lead single. Swift premiered a snippet of "We Are Never Ever Getting Back Together" via a live webchat on Google Hangouts on August 13, 2012; it was released to hot adult contemporary radio in the US the same day, promoted by Republic Records. The following day, Big Machine Records released the song for digital download via the iTunes Store and Google Play, and to US contemporary hit radio, in partnership with Republic. An alternate version was released to country radio on August 21, 2012, but was not released commercially. To help boost the song's reach to cross-genre radio formats of pop, adult contemporary, country, and rhythmic, Big Machine partnered with Republic and Clear Channel Media and Entertainment. A limited-edition individually numbered CD single was released to Swift's online store on September 4, 2012; each CD was packaged with a "We Are Never Ever Getting Back Together" T-shirt and backpack.

== Composition and lyrics ==
"We Are Never Ever Getting Back Together"
A sample of "We Are Never Ever Getting Back Together" featuring thumping bass drums, pulsing synthesizers, and processed vocals

"We Are Never Ever Getting Back Together" is 3 minutes and 12 seconds long. The song is anchored by a recurring acoustic guitar riff that features a light twang. Driven by an insistent four on the floor beat, the production features prominent electronic elements—pulsing synthesizers, keyboards, processed vocals, and a drum machine, alongside acoustic instruments of guitars and banjo. The thumping bass drum instrumentation evokes hip-hop.

Swift delivers the verses in a speak-singing style, while the refrain features a vocal hook that Swift sings the word "we" with an extra syllable, in half an octave higher. The musicologist James E. Perone wrote that Swift's vocals on "We Are Never Ever Getting Back Together" are both robotic and humane, thanks to the balance between processed vocals during most of the verses and unprocessed vocals at the end of each refrain as well as in the bridge and the spoken-word interlude, which runs from 2:14 to 2:24 and goes: "I'm just, I mean, this is exhausting. Like, we are never getting back together. Like, ever."

Critics aligned "We Are Never Ever Getting Back Together" with subgenres of pop music, including bubblegum pop, dance-pop, electropop, Europop, pop-punk, and pop rock. Steve Hyden, reflecting on the single in a 2021 article for The New York Times, characterized the song as electro-folk. The country-radio version incorporates a softer production, with the bass drums being muted and "some country instrumentation added". Perone commented that "We Are Never Ever Getting Back Together" is a musically flexible track, in that its song structure and melodic qualities resemble a conventional country song, but with modern influences of contemporary music that make it adaptable to many different genres.

The lyrics are about a protagonist's frustration over an ex-boyfriend who wants to rekindle their relationship. At one point, Swift sings, "And you would hide away and find your peace of mind/ With some indie record that's much cooler than mine", deriding the ex-boyfriend's pretentious music taste while referencing her own profession as a musical artist. Swift said that the cited lyrics were the song's most important detail because they reveal her real-life ex-boyfriend's judgment of her music, "It was a relationship where I felt very critiqued and subpar. He'd listen to this music that nobody had heard of ... but as soon as anyone else liked this band, he'd drop them." To this extent, she wrote "We Are Never Ever Getting Back Together" in hopes of commercial success to spite the ex-boyfriend, "Not only would it hopefully be played a lot, so that he'd have to hear it, but [also] it's the opposite of the kind of music that he was trying to make me feel inferior to." Various critics thought that the song's vocabulary exemplified the language that millennials or valley girls used.

== Critical reception ==
When "We Are Never Ever Getting Back Together" was first released, many critics commented on its pure pop production and contrasted it with Swift's status as a country musician. A multitude of critics highlighted its hook as catchy and infectious, although this was not necessarily a compliment. Robert Myers of The Village Voice contended that the pop production stripped away the emotionality of Swift's songwriting, but he contended that the pop production allowed Swift to introduce different themes to her core fan base of young females, breaking away from the "fairy-tale romanticism" that she had been known for. Grady Smith of Entertainment Weekly considered the chorus to have an earworm quality but regarded the lyrics as a regression following Speak Now. Billy Dukes of Taste of Country stated that Swift successfully "captures the anger of young love gone wrong" but contended that the melody was "difficult to embrace quickly".

Jonathan Keefe of Slant Magazine complimented the song's melodic composition and potential of becoming a "massive radio hit" but criticized Swift's "stilted phrasing" in a verse and the spoken-word bridge, describing them "flat and unconvincing". David Malitz of The Washington Post found the song immature and remarked, "the chorus is catchy but if this is representative of what awaits on Red, it's hard to be too excited." On a positive side, Jody Rosen, in his review for Rolling Stone, rated the song four stars out of five. He wrote that the song's "hooks, plural, have a zing that's more Stockholm than Nashville" but it was still "unmistakably Taylor: a witty relationship postmortem, delivered in inimitable girlie-girl patois". In another piece for Slate, Rosen argued that the catchy pop sound of "We Are Never Ever Getting Back Together" could be traced back to Swift's earlier singles like "Picture to Burn" or "Should've Said No" (2006); to this extent, the single was less of a novelty and more of a refinement.

Some critics remarked on the song's tone. Marah Eakin of The A.V. Club praised the production and "mildly snarky lyrics", while James Montgomery of MTV felt that the track represented a "defiant, liberated" Swift that no longer "[played] the victim" and that it was predisposed to be a successful radio hit. Giving the track an 85 score out of 100, Billboard opined that there was a "sardonic sneer" in Swift's vocals and that the song incorporated "biting sarcasm within her deep-rooted confidence". The music engineer Mike Senior commented that the spoken-word and speak-singing style of Swift contributed to the song's effectiveness, transcending the conventional pop melody. Glenn Gamboa of Newsday wrote that in the song, Swift still managed to "sound genuine and conversational" as before. In an article for NPR, Ann Powers wrote that "We Are Never Ever Getting Back Together" was neither earnest nor wistful as Swift's early country songs but instead "spins sugar from spit". According to Powers, by collaborating with Martin, Swift participated in a wave of defiant, sassy feminist "punk" female artists who conveyed their headstrong attitudes through songs, though Swift's delivery was still "too callow and insular to really be substantial".

=== Listicles and recognition ===
Several publications ranked "We Are Never Ever Getting Back Together" in their lists of the best songs of 2012, including Rolling Stone (second), Time (fourth), The Guardian (fifth), The Village Voice's Pazz & Jop critics' poll (sixth), PopMatters (11th), NME (24th), and Consequence of Sound (40th). The single was named the 169th best song of 2010–2014 on Pitchfork's "The 200 Best Tracks of the Decade So Far (2010–2014)" list. In 2019, Stereogum ranked the song as the 71st best song of the 2010s. Rolling Stone ranked the song as the thirteenth-best female country song of the 2000s and 2010s. The Tampa Bay Times ranked it 4th on their list of the best 2010s pop songs.

Critics have placed "We Are Never Ever Getting Back Together" highly on rankings of Swift's entire catalog; Hannah Mylrea from NME (2020) ranked it 15th out of 161 songs in Swift's discography, Nate Jones from Vulture (2021), 16th out of 245, and Rob Sheffield of Rolling Stone (2024), 27th out of 274. Alexis Petridis from The Guardian ranked the track 11th on a 2019 ranking of Swift's 44 singles, deeming it "revitalised – smarter, snarkier and tougher" compared to the "artistically underwhelming" Speak Now.

== Commercial performance ==
=== North America ===
In the US, "We Are Never Ever Getting Back Together" debuted at number 72 on the Billboard Hot 100 chart week ending August 25, 2012, based on two days of airplay. It rose to number one the following week, becoming Swift's first number-one single and registering one of the biggest single-week jumps in chart history. It also made Swift the country artist with the most top-10 chart entries (11, tied with Kenny Rogers). The song spent three non-consecutive weeks at number one, becoming the first country song to spend three or more weeks at number one since Kenny Rogers's "Lady" (1980). The single stayed in the top 10 for 13 non-consecutive weeks. On the Radio Songs chart, "We Are Never Ever Getting Back Together" entered at number 25, the highest debut for a female country artist, and peaked at number three. On the Hot Digital Songs chart, "We Are Never Ever Getting Back Together" debuted at number one with first-week sales of 623,000 digital copies in the week ending September 1, 2012, setting a record for the fastest-selling digital single by a female artist in Billboard chart history. (Note: The record was broken by Adele's 2015 single "Hello" (2015), which sold over 1.1 million digital copies in its first week.)

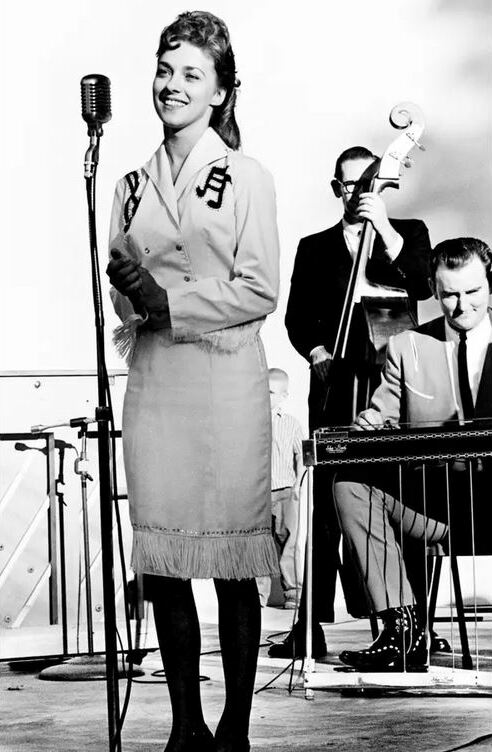
"We Are Never Ever Getting Back Together" broke the Hot Country Songs chart record of "Once a Day" (1965) by Connie Smith (pictured).

The single debuted at number 13 on the Hot Country Songs chart week ending September 1, 2012, based on airplay alone. It became the highest debut for a female country song on the airplay-based chart. After Billboard changed the methodology for the chart, incorporating digital sales and streaming into chart rankings in addition to airplay, "We Are Never Ever Getting Back Together" ascended to number one for the chart dated October 20, 2012, giving Swift her seventh Hot Country Songs number one. This prompted industry debate over the status of Swift as a country artist, given that "We Are Never Ever Getting Back Together" received lukewarm reception at country radio and never reached the top 10 of the Country Airplay chart, and was more favorably received at pop radio. It ultimately became Swift's first country-radio single to miss the top 10 of Country Airplay.

"We Are Never Ever Getting Back Together" remained on the top spot of the Hot Country Songs for nine consecutive weeks, breaking the eight consecutive weeks record of Connie Smith's "Once a Day" (1965) for the longest unbroken run at number one for a female artist. The song spent 10 weeks at number one, a career best for Swift and a record for the longest-run at number one for a female artist. (Note: The record was broken by Bebe Rexha's "Meant to Be" (2017) featuring Florida Georgia Line, which spent 50 consecutive weeks at number one.) The music historian Joel Whitburn commented that although the single peaked atop Hot Country Songs, the country-music industry preferred the Country Airplay chart because it reflected which songs were more popular on country radio, as opposed to Hot Country Songs' inclusion of non-country radio airplay, streaming, and downloads.

"We Are Never Ever Getting Back Together" peaked within the top ten of Billboard airplay charts including Adult Contemporary, where it reached number ten for seven non-consecutive weeks, Adult Pop Songs, where it reached number seven, and Pop Songs, where it peaked at number two for four non-consecutive weeks. Roughly two months after its release, the single surpassed two million US digital sales by September 2012, making Swift the first country artist to have six digital singles each sell over two million copies. By July 2019, "We Are Never Ever Getting Back Together" had sold 4.1 million copies in the US. The Recording Industry Association of America certified the single six-times platinum, denoting six million units based on sales and streaming. In neighboring Canada, the single peaked atop the Canadian Hot 100 and was certified gold by Music Canada.

=== Other markets ===
Outside North America, "We Are Never Ever Getting Back Together" peaked atop the record chart in New Zealand, where it was certified triple platinum by Recorded Music NZ. The single peaked within the top 10 on charts in Australia (number three), Ireland (number four), the UK (number four), Norway (number six), Hungary (number nine), and Spain (number nine). It peaked at number eight on Euro Digital Song Sales, a Billboard chart monitoring digital singles across Europe. The track was certified ten-times platinum in Australia, double platinum in the United Kingdom, platinum in Austria, Denmark, Germany, Sweden, and France, and gold in Italy, Mexico, and Spain. By October 2014, the single had sold over 616,000 digital copies in the UK.

In Japan, "We Are Never Ever Getting Back Together" was a major chart hit, peaking at number two on the Japan Hot 100 and remaining on the chart until 2015, three years after its release. In January 2015, the Recording Industry Association of Japan awarded the single a "Million" certification for selling over one million digital copies. As of October 2017, the single had sold 1.9 million digital copies in Japan, becoming Swift's most successful single in the country. The single was additionally certified platinum for surpassing 100 million streams in Japan in February 2024. In Brazil, the single was certified diamond.

== Music video ==
The music video for "We Are Never Ever Getting Back Together" was directed by Declan Whitebloom, who had directed the videos for Swift's singles "Mean" and "Ours". It premiered both on television and for internet streaming, via CMT, MTV, VH1, and TeenNick, on August 30, 2012. The video was staged like a pop-up book using a Sony F65 CineAlta camera with Leica 25 mm Summilux-C lens in one shot with no editing. It features five sets and Swift in as many outfits. It is also the first music video to be featured in 4K resolution. According to Swift, she wanted the video to be as "quirky as the song sounds" and stated: "There's just knitting everywhere; there's just random woodland creatures popping up."

The video begins with Swift in colorful pajamas recounting the events of her on-and-off relationship with her ex-boyfriend (played by Noah Mills). The video segues into Swift going into her living room, where her band is dressed up in animal costumes, and Swift sings the chorus. Then, Swift is seen on a TV saying, "Like, ever", and then sits in a dining room, where she recounts the events of her relationship and receives a phone call from her ex, who is calling her from a nightclub. Swift hangs up on him, and he walks off the screen into the nightclub. It then goes to the two in a truck having an argument, and then to them having a stroll in the park. Swift then runs off, and we see her on the phone telling the person on the other line how she and her ex are not getting back together. The video segues back to Swift's living room, where a party is going on, and her ex shows up unannounced, and she slams the door in his face. The video ends with Swift on her window ledge, where she was at the beginning of the video, singing the last line of the song.

James Montgomery of MTV praised the video's one-take styling as a technical success and "truly a treat to watch". Several publications commented on Swift's acting and delivery. Rolling Stone wrote that she showcased "flinging strong-willed sass", while Jim Farber from the New York Daily News commented that she was "conversational and sarcastic", which was resonant to "simulating intimacy with her massive teen girl fan-base", and Billboard described the clip as "a quirky celebration". There were a few less enthusiastic reviews. Senior said that the video featuring "a grown man rocking a beaver costume in a packed club while nonchalantly strumming an autoharp" made him like the song less. Tom Breihan of Stereogum said he "strongly [dislikes]" the video, pointing out the animal-costumed band as "the kind of attention-grabbing twee silliness" that failed to make up for the absence of visual direction.

== Live performances ==
On August 13, 2012, Swift performed an acoustic rendition of "We Are Never Ever Getting Back Together" for her "YouTube Webchat" session, which was recorded in Nashville. On September 6, Swift performed the song live as the closing number of the 2012 MTV Video Music Awards, which was held at the Staples Center in Los Angeles. Wearing a red-and-white striped shirt, black shorts, and red sneakers, Swift began her performance in an area resembling a recording studio before taking the stage along with her back-up singers, dancers, and band members in animal costumes. She put on sunglasses midway through the performance and concluded the number by jumping off the stage and crowd surfing through the audience. Rolling Stone described Swift's presence as "Patty Duke in her Daisies", and Entertainment Weekly rated the performance B+, praising the song as "awesome" but contended that the "furry costumes" were "a little too Oogieloves".

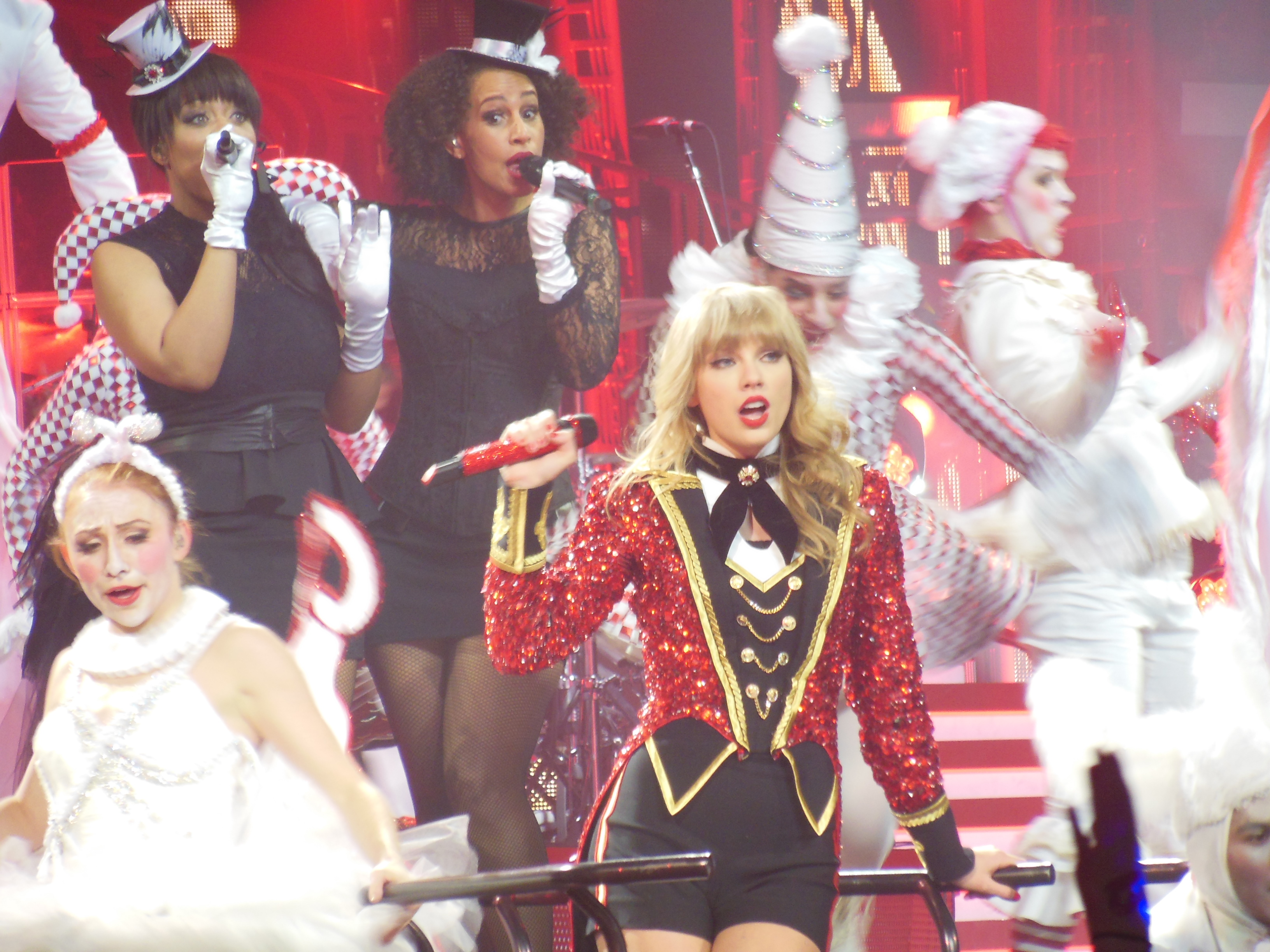
Swift as a circus ringmaster to perform "We Are Never Ever Getting Back Together" on the Red Tour in 2013

Swift also performed "We Are Never Ever Getting Back Together" on various TV programs and live broadcast events during promotion of Red in 2012. In the US, she performed the song live on The View, Good Morning America, and Dancing with the Stars. During a trip to Brazil, she sang the track on TV Xuxa and during her first live concert in the country, held in Rio de Janeiro on September 13. While promoting Red in international markets, Swift performed the single on an episode of the ninth series of the UK The X Factor on October 14, the Scandinavian talk show Skavlan, which was recorded in London on November 9, the Sukkiri Morning Show in Tokyo, Japan, on November 20, the Today show in Sydney, Australia, on November 25, and Schlag Den Raab in Cologne, Germany, on December 15.

The song was Swift's number for a round of awards-show appearances in Europe throughout 2012–2013, at the BBC Radio 1's Teen Awards on October 7, 2012, the MTV Europe Music Awards in Frankfurt, Germany, on November 11, 2012, Los Premios 40 Principales in Madrid, Spain, on January 25, 2013, and the NRJ Music Awards in Cannes, France, the following day. As part of a further promotional trip to France, Swift performed the track on Le Grand Journal and included it in a set list of a private concert for invited journalists and fans on the Seine in Paris. On February 10, 2013, Swift performed the song as the opening number for the 55th Annual Grammy Awards. She was dressed in an all-white costume of top hat, tailcoat, shorts, and boots, resembling a ringmaster of a circus consisting of clowns, dancers, marionettes, and a man balancing on stilts. The number ended with fireworks and confetti. Several media outlets reacted positively to the performance, praising the visual elements and theatrics, while commenting on Swift's vocals as unstable.

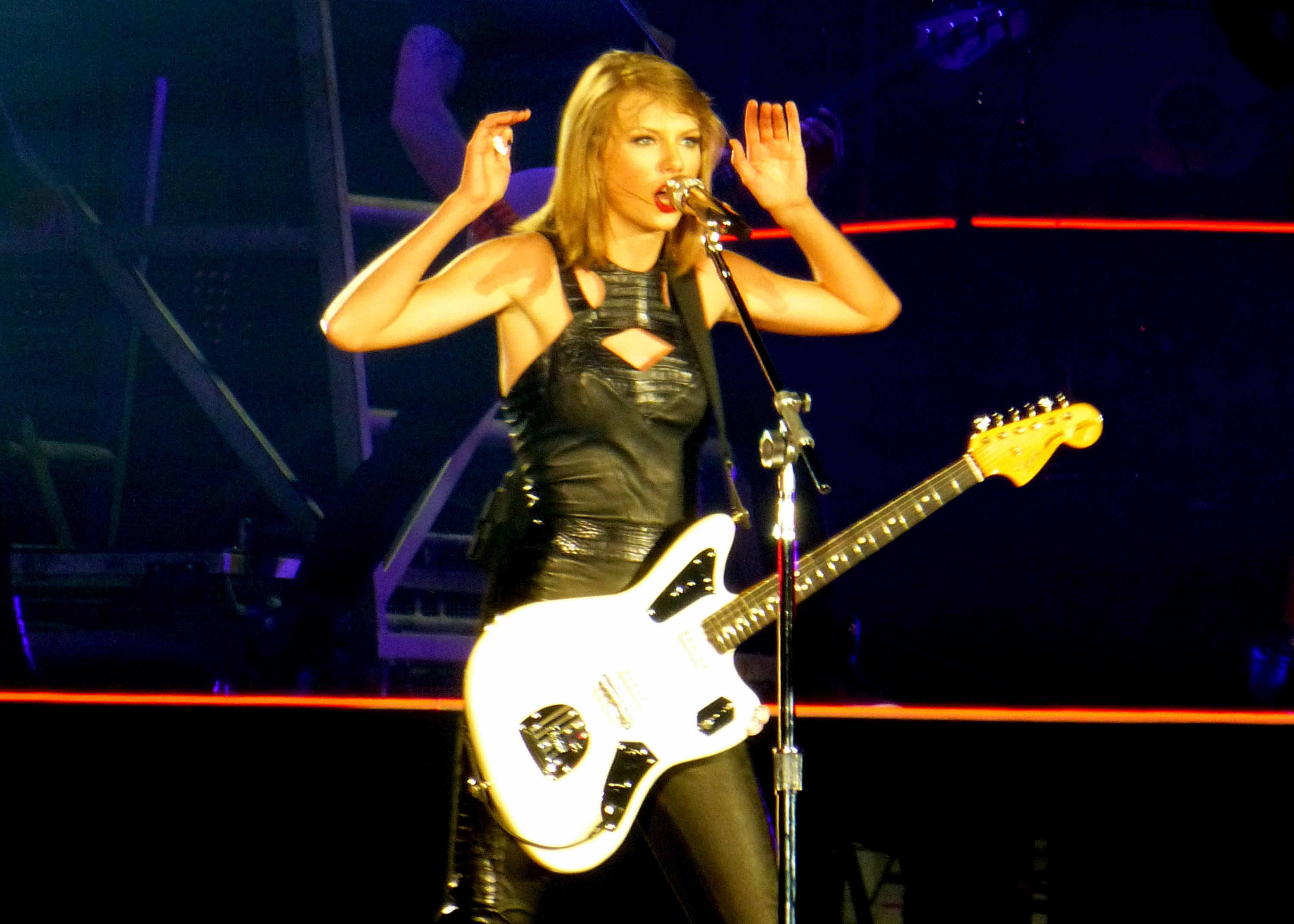
Swift performing a rock version of the song on the 1989 World Tour in 2015

Swift included "We Are Never Ever Getting Back Together" during her set list for several festivals and concerts in 2012–2013, including the iHeartRadio Music Festival, the KIIS-FM Jingle Ball, the Z100 Jingle Ball, and Dick Clark's New Year's Rockin' Eve in 2012; and the CMA Fest in 2013. On the Red Tour (2013–2014), she performed the song as the closing number. The performance was staged like a circus, inspired by the novel Alice's Adventures in Wonderland, with dancers dressed as various characters: a clown walking on stilts holding a red umbrella, a jester in red and white checkered clothes, a fairy in a tutu skirt, and rabbits; Swift was dressed as the ringmaster, in a red sequined jacket and a tall hat. The runway between the stage rose and spun over the audience's heads, and Swift asked the audience to sing along with her and ended the song with confetti and fireworks.

After the promotional campaign for Red, Swift continued performing "We Are Never Ever Getting Back Together" on later tours. On the 1989 World Tour (2015), Swift performed a rock and hair metal version of the song, donning black leather pants and playing an electric guitar. Several reviews picked it as a show highlight and commented that the background video during the performance resembled the White Stripes' visuals. She included the track in her set lists for her performances at the United States Grand Prix on October 22, 2016, and the pre-Super Bowl event Super Saturday Night on February 4, 2017. On her Reputation Stadium Tour (2018), Swift performed "We Are Never Ever Getting Back Together" as part of a mashup with "This Is Why We Can't Have Nice Things", as the closing number. The stage featured a gold-plated mansion and a water fountain, and the performance built up towards the end as water splashed and fireworks lightened up the venue.

In 2019, Swift performed the song at Wango Tango on June 1, and at Capital FM's Jingle Bell Ball in London on December 8. She included "We Are Never Ever Getting Back Together" in the set list of the Eras Tour (2023–2024).

== In popular culture ==
The American rock band Jimmy Eat World covered "We Are Never Ever Getting Back Together" during their 2013 tour promoting Damage. Brittany Spanos of The Village Voice described their cover as "slowed down, fuzzy". They also performed it on Conan on July 22, 2013; their version added elements of hard rock. Exclaim!'s Gregory Adams commented that the band's frontman Jim Adkins sang the song earnestly, and described the production as "downtempo though distorted". The band released their cover version as part of the extended play (EP) iTunes Session the same day.

"We Are Never Ever Getting Back Together" was used as the opening theme song of the Japanese reality TV show Terrace House: Boys × Girls Next Door from 2012 to 2014, which contributed to the successes of both the show and the song in Japan. The song and video were parodied by the YouTube channel "teddiefilms" in the style of Breaking Bad, uploaded on October 18, 2012. The track inspired the title of an episode of Grey's Anatomy's tenth season, "We Are Never Ever Getting Back Together".

Sky News remixed portions of speeches by David Cameron to make it appear as though he was reciting the chorus as a promotion for their coverage of the 2014 Scotland Independence Referendum.

== Accolades ==
Awards and nominations
Awards/Organization	Year	Category	Result	Ref.
World Music Awards	2012	World's Best Song	Nominated	
World Music Awards	2012	World's Best Video	Nominated	
Academy of Country Music Awards	2013	Video of the Year	Nominated	
Billboard Music Awards	2013	Top Streaming Song (Video)	Nominated	
Billboard Music Awards	2013	Top Country Song	Won	
BMI Pop Awards	2013	Award-Winning Songs	Won	
CMT Music Awards	2013	Video of the Year	Nominated	
Grammy Awards	2013	Record of the Year	Nominated	
MTV Video Music Awards Japan	2013	Best Female Video	Nominated	
MTV Video Music Awards Japan	2013	Best Pop Video	Nominated	
MTV Video Music Awards Japan	2013	Best Karaoke Video	Nominated	
MuchMusic Video Awards	2013	International Video of the Year	Nominated	
Myx Music Awards	2013	Favorite International Video	Nominated	
Nickelodeon Kids' Choice Awards	2013	Favorite Song	Nominated	
Kids' Choice Awards Argentina	2013	Favorite International Song	Nominated	
People's Choice Awards	2013	Favorite Song	Nominated	
Radio Disney Music Awards	2013	Best Break Up Song	Won	
Sirius XM Holdings Awards	2013	International Video of the Year	Nominated	
Sirius XM Holdings Awards	2013	International Single of the Year	Nominated	
Teen Choice Awards	2013	Choice Break-Up Song	Nominated	
Teen Choice Awards	2013	Choice Country Song	Won	
MTV Millennial Awards	2013	Catchiest Hit of the Year	Won	
Hito Music Awards	2013	Best Western Song	Won	
ASCAP Awards	2014	Most Performed Song	Won	
BMI Pop Awards	2014	Award-Winning Songs	Won	

== Credits and personnel ==
Credits are adapted from the liner notes of the CD single.

- Taylor Swift – lead vocals, writer, producer, backing vocals
- Max Martin – producer, writer, keyboards
- Shellback – producer, writer, guitar, bass, keyboards, programming
- Tom Coyne – mastering
- Eric Eylands – assistant recording
- Serban Ghenea – mixing
- John Hanes – engineer
- Sam Holland – recording
- Michael Ilbert – recording
- Tim Roberts – assistant engineer

== Charts ==
=== Weekly charts ===
Weekly chart performance
Chart (2012–2015)	Peak position
Australia (ARIA)	3
Austria (Ö3 Austria Top 40)	22
Belgium (Ultratop 50 Flanders)	26
Belgium (Ultratop 50 Wallonia)	42
Canada Hot 100 (Billboard)	1
Canada AC (Billboard)	1
Canada CHR/Top 40 (Billboard)	3
Canada Country (Billboard)	16
Canada Hot AC (Billboard)	3
Czech Republic Airplay (ČNS IFPI)	26
Denmark (Tracklisten)	18
Denmark Airplay (Tracklisten)	3
Euro Digital Song Sales (Billboard)	8
Finland (Suomen virallinen lista)	18
France (SNEP)	18
Germany (GfK)	21
Germany Airplay (BVMI)	16
Honduras (Honduras Top 50)	21
Hungary (Rádiós Top 40)	9
Ireland (IRMA)	4
Italy (FIMI)	44
Japan Hot 100 (Billboard)	2
Japan Adult Contemporary (Billboard Japan)	1
Mexico (Billboard Ingles Airplay)	15
Mexico Anglo (Monitor Latino)	20
Netherlands (Dutch Top 40)	16
Netherlands (Single Top 100)	24
New Zealand (Recorded Music NZ)	1
Norway (VG-lista)	6
Slovakia Airplay (ČNS IFPI)	41
South Korea (Gaon)	52
South Korea International Singles (Gaon)	2
Spain (Promusicae)	9
Sweden (Sverigetopplistan)	16
Switzerland (Schweizer Hitparade)	21
Switzerland Airplay (Schweizer Hitparade)	8
UK Singles (Official Charts)	4
US Billboard Hot 100	1
US Adult Contemporary (Billboard)	10
US Adult Pop Airplay (Billboard)	7
US Country Airplay (Billboard)	13
US Dance Airplay (Billboard)	21
US Hot Country Songs (Billboard)	1
US Latin Airplay (Billboard)	47
US Pop Airplay (Billboard)	2
US Rhythmic Airplay (Billboard)	35
Venezuela Pop Rock (Record Report)	3

=== Year-end charts ===
2012 year-end charts
Chart (2012)	Position
Australia (ARIA)	19
Canada (Canadian Hot 100)	39
Japan (Japan Hot 100)	28
Japan Adult Contemporary (Billboard Japan)	5
Netherlands (Dutch Top 40)	80
New Zealand (RMNZ)	17
South Korea International (Gaon)	21
Sweden (Sverigetopplistan)	79
Taiwan (Hito Radio)	32
UK Singles (OCC)	26
US Billboard Hot 100	33
US Adult Contemporary (Billboard)	25
US Adult Pop Songs (Billboard)	43
US Hot Country Songs (Billboard)	86
US Pop Songs (Billboard)	34

2013 year-end charts
Chart (2013)	Position
Canada (Canadian Hot 100)	100
France (SNEP)	146
Japan (Japan Hot 100)	16
Japan Adult Contemporary (Billboard Japan)	23
South Korea International (Gaon)	40
UK Singles (OCC)	175
US Hot Country Songs (Billboard)	14

2014 year-end charts
Chart (2014)	Position
Japan (Japan Hot 100)	52
Japan Adult Contemporary (Billboard Japan)	63
South Korea International (Gaon)	89

2015 year-end charts
Chart (2015)	Position
Japan (Japan Hot 100)	49
South Korea International (Gaon)	79

=== Decade-end chart ===
2010s decade-end chart
Chart (2010–2019)	Position
US Hot Country Songs (Billboard)	41

== Certifications ==
Certifications
Region	Certification	Certified units/sales
Australia (ARIA)	10× Platinum	700,000^{‡}
Austria (IFPI Austria)	Platinum	30,000^{*}
Brazil (Pro-Música Brasil)	Diamond	250,000^{‡}
Canada (Music Canada)	Gold	40,000^{*}
France (SNEP)	Platinum	200,000^{‡}
Germany (BVMI)	Platinum	300,000^{‡}
Italy (FIMI)	Gold	15,000^{‡}
Japan (RIAJ)	Million	1,900,000
Mexico (AMPROFON)	Gold	30,000^{*}
New Zealand (RMNZ)	3× Platinum	90,000^{‡}
Spain (Promusicae)	Gold	30,000^{‡}
Sweden (GLF)	Platinum	40,000^{‡}
United Kingdom (BPI)	2× Platinum	1,200,000^{‡}
United States (RIAA)	6× Platinum	6,000,000^{‡}
Streaming
Denmark (IFPI Danmark)	Platinum	1,800,000^{†}
Japan (RIAJ)	Platinum	100,000,000^{†}
^{*} Sales figures based on certification alone.^{‡} Sales+streaming figures based on certification alone.^{†} Streaming-only figures based on certification alone.

== Release history ==
Release dates and formats
Country	Date	Format	Label	Ref.
United States	August 13, 2012	Hot adult contemporary radio	Big Machine; Republic	
United States	August 14, 2012	Contemporary hit radio	Big Machine; Republic	
Various	August 14, 2012	Digital download	Big Machine	
United Kingdom	August 19, 2012	Contemporary hit radio	Big Machine; Mercury	
United States	August 21, 2012	Country radio	Big Machine	
United States	September 4, 2012	CD single	Big Machine	
Italy	September 7, 2012	Radio airplay	Universal	
Germany	September 28, 2012	Digital download	Universal	

== "We Are Never Ever Getting Back Together (Taylor's Version)" ==
"We Are Never Ever Getting Back Together (Taylor's Version)"

Song by Taylor Swift

from the album Red (Taylor's Version)
- Released: November 12, 2021
- Studio: Prime Recording (Nashville)
- Length: 3:13
- Label: Republic
- Songwriters: Taylor Swift; Max Martin; Shellback
- Producers: Taylor Swift; Shellback; Christopher Rowe

Lyric video
- "We Are Never Ever Getting Back Together (Taylor's Version)" on YouTube

After signing a new contract with Republic Records, Swift began re-recording her first six studio albums in November 2020. The decision followed a public 2019 dispute between Swift and the talent manager Scooter Braun, who acquired Big Machine Records, including the masters of Swift's albums which the label had released. By re-recording the albums, Swift had full ownership of the new masters, which enabled her to control the licensing of her songs for commercial use.

Swift re-recorded "We Are Never Ever Getting Back Together", subtitled "(Taylor's Version)", for her second re-recorded album, Red (Taylor's Version), released on November 12, 2021, through Republic Records. The re-recorded song was produced by Swift, Shellback, and Christopher Rowe. It was edited at Prime Recording Studio in Nashville.

While the re-recording's arrangement is the same as the original song's, critics primarily commented on Swift's delivery of certain phrases and words. Olivia Horn of Pitchfork opined that the re-recorded "wee-ee"s were more cloying than the original, while Rob Sheffield of Rolling Stone stated that the song included "a little extra venom" when she delivered the words "trust me". According to Hannah Mylrea of NME, Swift's vocal maturity can be observed in the spoken-word moments, including in the line: "With some indie record that's much cooler than mine."

=== Credits ===
Credits adapted from the liner notes of Red (Taylor's Version)

==== Studios ====
- Engineered and edited at Prime Recording, Nashville
- Swift's lead vocals recorded at Conway Recording Studios, Los Angeles, and Kitty Committee Studio, Belfast
- Mixed at MixStar Studios, Virginia Beach

==== Personnel ====
- Taylor Swift – producer, vocals, background vocals
- Christopher Rowe – vocal engineering, vocal recording, producer
- Shellback – producer
- Sam Holland – vocal engineering, vocal recording
- Amos Heller – bass guitar, synth bass
- Matt Billingslea – drums, percussion, drum programming
- Max Bernstein – synthesizer
- Mike Meadows – synthesizer, acoustic guitar
- Paul Sidoti – electric guitar
- Dan Burns – programming, additional engineering
- Derek Garten – engineer, editor
- Randy Merrill – mastering
- Serban Ghenea – mixing
- Bryce Bordone – mix engineering

=== Charts ===
Chart performance for "We Are Never Ever Getting Back Together (Taylor's Version)"
Chart (2021–2024)	Peak position
Australia (ARIA)	34
Canada Hot 100 (Billboard)	40
Global 200 (Billboard)	41
Portugal (AFP)	141
Singapore (RIAS)	22
Sweden Heatseeker (Sverigetopplistan)	20
UK Audio Streaming (Official Charts)	61
US Billboard Hot 100	55
US Hot Country Songs (Billboard)	16

=== Certifications ===
Certifications for "Taylor's Version"
Region	Certification	Certified units/sales
Australia (ARIA)	Platinum	70,000^{‡}
Brazil (Pro-Música Brasil)	Gold	20,000^{‡}
New Zealand (RMNZ)	Platinum	30,000^{‡}
^{‡} Sales+streaming figures based on certification alone.

== See also ==
- List of Billboard Hot 100 number-one singles of 2012
- List of Billboard number-one country songs of 2012
- List of number-one digital songs of 2012 (U.S.)
- List of Canadian Hot 100 number-one singles of 2012
- List of number-one singles from the 2010s (New Zealand)
- List of highest-certified singles in Australia
