= I Drive Your Truck =

Single by Lee Brice

from the album Hard 2 Love
- Released: December 3, 2012
- Genre: Country
- Length: 3:54
- Label: Curb
- Songwriters: Jessi Alexander; Connie Harrington; Jimmy Yeary
- Producers: Kyle Jacobs; Matt McClure; Lee Brice

Lee Brice singles chronology
"Hard to Love" (2012)	"I Drive Your Truck" (2012)	"Parking Lot Party" (2013)

"I Drive Your Truck" is a song written by Jessi Alexander, Connie Harrington, and Jimmy Yeary and recorded by American country music artist Lee Brice. It was released in December 2012 as the third single from his album Hard 2 Love.

== Content ==
The song is about the narrator driving a truck owned by his brother, who died in action in the United States Army. Co-writer Connie Harrington was inspired to write it after hearing an interview on Here and Now with a father, Paul Monti, whose son, Medal of Honor recipient Jared, was killed in Afghanistan while trying to save a fellow soldier. In the interview, he states that he drives the truck to feel close to his son.

The truck that appears in the music video is a 1973 Ford F-100. The actual truck driven by Jared Monti, and then his father, Paul, was a Dodge Ram 1500 adorned with decals, including the 10th Mountain Division, the 82nd Airborne Division, an American flag and a "Go Army" decal. On September 1, 2022, Jared's truck was driven by two of his Army comrades during the funeral procession for Paul Monti.

== Critical reception ==
Billy Dukes of Taste of Country gave it 4.5 stars out of 5, saying that "Brice’s strong lyrical performance[…]should broaden the story’s scope, making it a big hit commercially and artistically." Tammy Ragusa of Country Weekly gave the single an A grade. She said that Brice "sings it like his life depends on it" and praised the detail of the lyrics.

The song was awarded Song of the Year honors at the 47th annual Country Music Association Awards, as well as Song of the Year at the 49th annual Academy of Country Music Awards.

== Music video ==
The video features Brice's brother, Lewis.

== Commercial performance ==
The song gained sufficient airplay to debut on the Country Airplay for chart dated February 23, 2013, and eventually reaching No. 1 on this chart on April 20, 2013, making it his third consecutive No. 1. It also debuted on the Billboard Hot 100 at No. 91 in February 2013 and peaked at No. 47 on April 13, 2013. It reached No. 6 on the Hot Country Songs and No. 11 on the Country Digital Songs. The song has sold 870,000 copies in the US as of April 2014.

== Charts and certifications ==
=== Weekly charts ===
Chart (2012–2013)	Peak position
Canada Hot 100 (Billboard)	53
Canada Country (Billboard)	3
US Billboard Hot 100	47
US Country Airplay (Billboard)	1
US Hot Country Songs (Billboard)	6

=== Year-end charts ===
Chart (2013)	Position
US Country Airplay (Billboard)	34
US Hot Country Songs (Billboard)	38

=== Certifications ===
Region	Certification	Certified units/sales
Canada (Music Canada)	Gold	40,000^{*}
United States (RIAA)	2× Platinum	2,000,000^{‡}
^{*} Sales figures based on certification alone.^{‡} Sales+streaming figures based on certification alone.
