= Memory I Don't Mess With =

2020 single by Lee Brice

Single by Lee Brice

from the album Hey World
- Released: October 15, 2020
- Recorded: 2018
- Genre: Country; R&B
- Length: 3:00
- Label: Curb
- Songwriters: Lee Brice; Billy Montana; Brian Davis
- Producers: Lee Brice; Ben Glover; Kyle Jacobs

Lee Brice singles chronology
"One of Them Girls" (2020)	"Memory I Don't Mess With" (2020)	"Soul" (2021)

Music video
- "Memory I Don't Mess With" on YouTube

"Memory I Don't Mess With" is a song by American country music singer Lee Brice. It was released on October 15, 2020, as the second single from his fifth studio album Hey World. Brice wrote the song with Billy Montana and Brian Davis, and it was produced by Ben Glover and Kyle Jacobs.

== Background ==
Brice told PopCulture.com that he wanted to put out something rocking to get people ready to come back to shows.

Brice stated that the song is "about exactly what it says. It's one of those memories, it's one of those things that you can't let yourself get too close to because it just pulls you in too deep, the memory's always there. The pictures are always there in your head. But that's the one you've gotta let alone, and let just be a memory."

== Music video ==
The music video was released on November 3, 2020. It depicts a young couple's love story.

== Charts ==
=== Weekly charts ===
Weekly chart performance for "Memory I Don't Mess With"
Chart (2020–2021)	Peak position
Canada Hot 100 (Billboard)	65
Canada Country (Billboard)	1
US Billboard Hot 100	33
US Country Airplay (Billboard)	1
US Hot Country Songs (Billboard)	5

=== Year-end charts ===
Year-end chart performance for "Memory I Don't Mess With"
Chart (2021)	Position
US Country Airplay (Billboard)	18
US Hot Country Songs (Billboard)	26

== Certifications ==
Region	Certification	Certified units/sales
United States (RIAA)	2× Platinum	2,000,000^{‡}
^{‡} Sales+streaming figures based on certification alone.
