= Parking Lot Party =

Single by Lee Brice

from the album Hard 2 Love
- Released: May 13, 2013
- Recorded: 2013
- Genre: Country
- Length: 3:27 (album version); 3:05 (radio edit)
- Label: Curb
- Songwriters: Lee Brice; Thomas Rhett; Rhett Akins; Luke Laird
- Producers: Lee Brice; Jon Stone

Lee Brice singles chronology
"I Drive Your Truck" (2012)	"Parking Lot Party" (2013)	"I Don't Dance" (2014)

"Parking Lot Party" is song co-written and recorded by American country music artist Lee Brice. It was released in May 2013 as the fourth single from his 2012 album Hard 2 Love. The song was written by Brice, Rhett Akins, Thomas Rhett and Luke Laird.

== Content ==
The song is an up-tempo about a male partying with his friends before a concert. The album version of the song contains an introduction from syndicated radio show hosts Big D and Bubba.

== Critical reception ==
Billy Dukes of Taste of Country gave it 2.5 stars out of 5, saying that "'Parking Lot Party' is a good (but not great) party song, a subgenre that rarely gets top ratings anyway. Phony crowd effects only obfuscate a simple song, and this jam would be better without that addition." Giving it 4 out of 5 stars, Bobby Peacock of Roughstock said that " The production is loud, but in a rockin' kind of way that adds energy...and Brice's rough-edged vocal is full of charm."

== Chart and certifications ==
The song has sold 519,000 copies in the US as of January 2014. As of January 15, 2014, "Parking Lot Party" is Brice's fourth consecutive single, and his fifth total, to be certified Gold or higher by the RIAA.

Weekly chart performance
Chart (2013)	Peak position
Canada Hot 100 (Billboard)	79
Canada Country (Billboard)	8
US Billboard Hot 100	62
US Country Airplay (Billboard)	6
US Hot Country Songs (Billboard)	11

=== Year-end charts ===
Annual chart rankings
Chart (2013)	Position
US Country Airplay (Billboard)	5
US Hot Country Songs (Billboard)	40
US Radio Songs (Billboard)	75

=== Certifications ===
Region	Certification	Certified units/sales
Canada (Music Canada)	Gold	40,000^{*}
United States (RIAA)	Platinum	1,000,000^{‡}
^{*} Sales figures based on certification alone.^{‡} Sales+streaming figures based on certification alone.
