= Hard 2 Love (Lee Brice album) =

Studio album by Lee Brice
- Released: April 24, 2012
- Recorded: 2011–2012
- Genre: Country
- Length: 49:05
- Label: Curb Records
- Producers: Lee Brice; Kyle Jacobs; Doug Johnson; Matt McClure; Jon Stone

Lee Brice chronology
Love Like Crazy (2010)	Hard 2 Love (2012)	I Don't Dance (2014)

Singles from Hard 2 Love
- 1. "A Woman Like You" Released: October 17, 2011; 2. "Hard to Love" Released: May 14, 2012; 3. "I Drive Your Truck" Released: December 3, 2012; 4. "Parking Lot Party" Released: May 13, 2013

Hard 2 Love is the second studio album by American country music artist Lee Brice. It was released on April 24, 2012, by Curb Records. The album includes the number one singles "A Woman Like You”, “Hard to love” and “I Drive Your Truck”.

== Critical reception ==
Professional ratings
Review scores
Source	Rating
Allmusic	3.5/5 stars
USA Today	3.5/4 stars

At USA Today, Brian Mansfield rated the album three-and-a-half stars out of four, remarking that the release "is as well-crafted a set of country tunes as you'll hear all year." Stephen Thomas Erlewine rated the album three-and-a-half stars out of five, observing how "Perhaps the album could use a song that grabbed you by the throat but it's sturdy and quietly persuasive, its strengths sounding clearer and bolder with each listen."

== Commercial performance ==
As of November 6, 2013, the album has sold 471,000 copies in the U.S.

== Track listing ==
No.	Title	Writer(s)	Length
1.	"Hard to Love"	Billy Montana; John Ozier; Ben Glover	3:40
2.	"A Woman Like You"	Johnny Bulford; Phil Barton; Jon Stone	3:27
3.	"That's When You Know It's Over"	Lee Brice; Jerrod Niemann; Stone	3:19
4.	"Parking Lot Party"	Brice; Thomas Rhett; Rhett Akins; Luke Laird	3:27
5.	"Don't Believe Everything You Think"	Brice; Jim Collins; Stone	3:07
6.	"I Drive Your Truck"	Jessi Alexander; Connie Harrington; Jimmy Yeary	3:54
7.	"See About a Girl"	Brice; Phillip Lammonds; Kyle Jacobs	3:57
8.	"Friends We Won't Forget"	Brice; Rob Hatch; Lance Miller	3:39
9.	"Life Off My Years"	Eric Church; Michael P. Heeney; Jeff Hyde	4:33
10.	"Seven Days a Thousand Times"	Brice; Montana; Stone	3:23
11.	"Beer"	Chris Tompkins; Mark Irwin; Joe Collins	3:18
12.	"That Way Again"	Brice; Montana; Stone	4:55
13.	"One More Day"	Brice; Reg Smith	4:29

== Personnel ==
Compiled from liner notes.

=== Musicians ===
"Hard to Love"

- Ben Glover – background vocals
- Tommy Harden – drums, percussion
- Mark Hill – bass guitar
- Jedd Hughes – acoustic guitar
- Kyle Jacobs – background vocals
- Mike Johnson – steel guitar
- Jeff King – electric guitar
- Matt McClure – background vocals
- Jerry McPherson – electric guitar
- Jason Webb – Hammond B-3 organ

"A Woman Like You"

- Mike Brignardello – bass guitar
- Jim "Moose" Brown – piano
- Pat McGrath – acoustic guitar, resonator guitar
- Russ Pahl – steel guitar
- Brian Pruitt – drums, percussion
- Adam Shoenfeld – electric guitar

"That's When You Know It's Over"

- J. T. Corenflos – electric guitar
- Dennis Holt – drums
- Charles Judge – Hammond B-3 organ, synthesizer, programming
- Jeff King – electric guitar
- Jimmie Lee Sloas – bass guitar
- Pat McGrath – acoustic guitar
- Russ Pahl – steel guitar
- Ilya Toshinsky – mandolin

"Parking Lot Party"

- Tom Bukovac – electric guitar
- Lee Brice – electric guitar
- Shawn Fichter – drums
- Jedd Hughes – electric guitar
- Tony Lucido – bass guitar

"Don't Believe Everything You Think"

- Tom Bukovac – electric guitar
- Perry Coleman – background vocals
- Shawn Fichter – drums, percussion
- Jedd Hughes – acoustic guitar, electric guitar
- Charles Judge – Rhodes piano, synthesizer
- Tony Lucido – bass guitar
- Russ Pahl – steel guitar
- Ilya Toshinsky – mandolin

"I Drive Your Truck"

- Tommy Harden – drums
- Mark Hill – bass guitar
- Jedd Hughes – acoustic guitar
- Mike Johnson – steel guitar
- Jeff King – electric guitar
- Jerry McPherson – electric guitar
- Russell Terrell – background vocals
- Jason Webb – piano, Hammond B-3 organ

"See About a Girl"

- Mark Hill – bass guitar
- Dennis Holt – drums, percussion
- Kyle Jacobs – piano
- Jeff King – electric guitar
- Phillip Lammonds – mandolin
- Jerry McPherson – electric guitar
- Pat McGrath – acoustic guitar, mandolin
- Sara Reeveley – phone call
- Russell Terrell – background vocals
- Jason Webb – piano

"Friends We Won't Forget"

- Lee Brice – acoustic guitar
- Pat Buchanan – electric guitar
- Kenny Greenberg – electric guitar
- Tully Kennedy – electric guitar
- Rich Redmond – drums
- Ed Seay – background vocals
- Reggie Smith – Hammond B-3 organ
- Jimmie Lee Sloas – bass guitar
- Jon Stone – background vocals

"Life Off My Years"

- Tom Bukovac – electric guitar, acoustic guitar
- Perry Coleman – background vocals
- Shawn Fichter – drums
- Jedd Hughes – electric guitar, acoustic guitar
- Charles Judge – Hammond B-3 organ, synthesizer, percussion
- Tony Lucido – bass guitar
- Marcus Myers – dulcimer
- Russ Pahl – steel guitar
- Ilya Toshinsky – mandolin

"Seven Days a Thousand Times"

- Tom Bukovac – acoustic guitar, electric guitar
- Perry Coleman – background vocals
- Charles Judge – piano, synthesizer, programming
- Chris McHugh – drums
- Jimmie Lee Sloas – bass guitar
- Jon Stone – background vocals
- Ilya Toshinsky – mandolin

"Beer"

- Lee Brice – acoustic guitar
- Pat Buchanan – electric guitar
- Kenny Greenberg – electric guitar
- Chris Janson – harmonica
- Tully Kennedy – electric guitar
- Rich Redmond – drums
- Ed Seay – background vocals
- Jimmie Lee Sloas – bass guitar
- Reggie Smith – Hammond B-3 organ
- Jon Stone – background vocals

"That Way Again"

- David Angell – violin
- Lee Brice – acoustic guitar
- John Catchings – cello
- David Davidson – violin
- Reg Smith – Hammond B-3 organ
- Kristin Wilkinson – viola

"One More Day"

- Lee Brice – acoustic guitar
- Tom Bukovac – 12-string guitar
- Shawn Fichter – drums, percussion
- Jedd Hughes – electric guitar
- Tony Lucido – bass guitar
- Reg Smith – piano

=== Technical ===
- Steve Blackmon – editing on "See About a Girl"
- Drew Bollman – recording
- Lee Brice – production (tracks 2–5, 9–13)
- Dan Frizsell – engineering
- Don Hart – string arrangements and conducting on "That Way Again"
- Kyle Jacobs – production (tracks 1, 6, 7)
- Doug Johnson – production (tracks 8, 11), engineering
- Matt McClure – production (tracks 1, 6, 7), recording, overdubbing, engineering, mixing
- Justin Niebank – recording, mixing
- Ed Seay – engineering
- Jon Stone – production (tracks 2–5, 9, 10, 12, 13)
- Hank Williams – mastering

== Charts ==
=== Weekly charts ===
Chart (2012)	Peak position
US Billboard 200	5
US Top Country Albums (Billboard)	2

=== Year-end charts ===
Chart (2012)	Position
US Billboard 200	110
US Top Country Albums (Billboard)	25

Chart (2013)	Position
US Billboard 200	125
US Top Country Albums (Billboard)	29

=== Singles ===
Year	Single	Peak chart positions				
Year	Single	US Country	US Country Airplay	US	CAN Country	CAN
2011	"A Woman Like You"	1	—	33	—	49
2012	"Hard to Love"	4	1	27	—	51
2012	"I Drive Your Truck"	6	1	47	3	53
2013	"Parking Lot Party"	11	6	62	8	79
"—" denotes releases that did not chart

== Certifications ==
Region	Certification	Certified units/sales
United States (RIAA)	Platinum	1,000,000^{‡}
^{‡} Sales+streaming figures based on certification alone.
