= Beautiful Every Time =

Single by Lee Brice

from the album Love Like Crazy
- Released: October 25, 2010
- Recorded: 2010
- Genre: Country
- Length: 3:30
- Label: Curb
- Songwriters: Lee Brice; Rob Hatch; Lance Miller
- Producers: Lee Brice; Doug Johnson

Lee Brice singles chronology
"Love Like Crazy" (2009)	"Beautiful Every Time" (2010)	"A Woman Like You" (2011)

"Beautiful Every Time" is a song recorded by American country music artist Lee Brice. It was released in October 2010 as the second single from his debut album, Love Like Crazy. Brice wrote the song with Rob Hatch and Lance Miller.

== Critical reception ==
Noah Eaton of American Noise gave the song a thumbs down, saying that it "lazily grasps at the most obvious representations encased in contemporary country music for the sole purpose of reaffirming to the listener that this hodge-podge of still-frames from the heartland are 'beautiful every time.'" Kyle Ward of Roughstock gave the song two and a half stars out of five, writing that "the song does an adequate job of using the imagery to convey its point, but the lyrics and production seem to fall short of some of Brice’s previous tracks." Bobby Peacock was more favorable on the same site's review of the album, saying that it was an example of how the album's "songs are strengthened by putting sharp lyrics and arrangements to familiar ideas." He added that "It even manages to hold its theme by leading into an oceanside wedding in the second verse."

== Music video ==
The music video was directed by Eric Welch and premiered in March 2011.

== Chart performance ==
"Beautiful Every Time" debuted at number 59 on the U.S. Billboard Hot Country Songs chart for the week of November 6, 2010.

Chart (2010–2011)	Peak position
US Hot Country Songs (Billboard)	30
