= Love Like Crazy (song) =

Single by Lee Brice

from the album Love Like Crazy
- Released: August 24, 2009
- Genre: Country
- Length: 3:37
- Label: Curb
- Songwriters: Tim James; Doug Johnson
- Producers: Lee Brice; Doug Johnson

Lee Brice singles chronology
"Upper Middle Class White Trash" (2008)	"Love Like Crazy" (2009)	"Beautiful Every Time" (2010)

"Love Like Crazy" is a song written by Tim James and Doug Johnson, and recorded by American country music artist Lee Brice. It was released in August 2009 as the fourth single of his career, and the first single and title track from his album Love Like Crazy. In September 2010, the song broke a record established by Eddy Arnold for the longest chart run in the history of the Hot Country Songs charts.

== Content ==
"Love Like Crazy" is a mid-tempo country song that gives a short biography of an older man, in which he takes several large risks criticized by those around him as "crazy" (such as quitting his job in order to go into computers). All of these seemingly questionable decisions end up paying off. In the chorus, the old man explains that his success was made possible by his faithful and loving wife; he then describes the rules of life that made his marriage as successful as it was.

Brice told Country Weekly that he chose to record the song because its storyline reminded him of his own grandmother and grandfather, who were married to each other for more than 50 years.

== Personnel ==
Compiled from liner notes.

- Lee Brice — lead vocals
- Gary Burnette — acoustic guitar
- Pat Buchanan — electric guitar
- Perry Coleman — background vocals
- Dan Dugmore — steel guitar
- Tony Harrell — piano
- Steve Mackey — bass guitar
- Greg Morrow — drums

== Chart performance ==
"Love Like Crazy" debuted at number 58 on the U.S. Billboard Hot Country Songs for the chart week of September 5, 2009. "Love Like Crazy" entered the top ten on Hot Country Songs in its 46th week on the chart, making for the slowest climb into the top ten in the chart's history. The previous record-holders were Gary Allan's "Right Where I Need to Be" and Josh Gracin's "We Weren't Crazy" at 40 weeks each. On the chart dated for the week ending September 18, 2010, the song charted its 55th week, breaking the record set by Eddy Arnold's 1948 single "Bouquet of Roses" for the longest run in the history of the Hot Country Songs chart. It also debuted at number 97 on the Canadian Hot 100 chart for the week of September 25, 2010. In December 2010, Billboard determined, via airplay and chart time, that the song was the number-one country song in all of 2010, becoming the first song to do so without placing at number-one on the Hot Country Songs chart at any point during the year.

== Charts and certifications ==
=== Weekly charts ===
Chart (2009–2010)	Peak position
Canada Hot 100 (Billboard)	77
Canada Country (Billboard)	11
US Billboard Hot 100	45
US Hot Country Songs (Billboard)	3

=== Certifications ===
Region	Certification	Certified units/sales
United States (RIAA)	2× Platinum	2,000,000^{‡}
^{‡} Sales+streaming figures based on certification alone.

=== Year-end charts ===
Chart (2010)	Peak position
U.S. Billboard Hot Country Songs	1
