= Hey World =

Studio album by Lee Brice
- Released: November 20, 2020
- Genre: Country
- Label: Curb
- Producers: Lee Brice; Kyle Jacobs; Ben Glover; "I Hope You're Happy Now" produced by busbee

Lee Brice chronology
Lee Brice (2017)	Hey World (2020)	Sunriser (2026)

Singles from Hey World
- 1. "One of Them Girls" Released: April 20, 2020; 2. "Memory I Don't Mess With" Released: October 15, 2020; 3. "Soul" Released: November 29, 2021; 4. "Save the Roses" Released: March 6, 2023

Hey World is the fifth album by American country music singer Lee Brice. It was released on November 20, 2020, via Curb Records.

== Content ==
Brice confirmed the album's track listing in September 2020. The album's release was preceded by the two singles "One of Them Girls" and "Memory I Don't Mess With". Also included on the album is "I Hope You're Happy Now", a duet with Carly Pearce from the latter's self-titled album. The Voice contestant Blessing Offor sings duet vocals on the title track.

== Critical reception ==
Rating it 3.5 out of 5 stars, Stephen Thomas Erlewine of AllMusic found the album to contain more stylistic variety than its predecessors. He also said of Brice that "he wears his impending middle age quite well, proving that even if he's changing his fashions, what looks best on him is something with a little heart."

== Track listing ==
No.	Title	Writer(s)	Length
1.	"Atta Boy"	Lee Brice; John Johnston; Bobby Pinson	3:03
2.	"One of Them Girls"	Brice; Dallas Davidson; Ashley Gorley; Ben Johnson; *	3:09
3.	"More Beer"	Brice; Brian Davis; Adam Wood	2:34
4.	"Memory I Don't Mess With"	Brice; Davis; Billy Montana	3:31
5.	"Save the Roses"	Brice; Kyle Jacobs; Jimmie Lee Sloas	3:21
6.	"Good Ol' Boys"	Brice; Davis; Gorley; Johnson	3:06
7.	"Don't Need No Reason"	Brice; Jacobs; Chris DeStefano	3:12
8.	"Do Not Disturb"	Brice; Davis; Jacobs; Phillip Lammonds	3:12
9.	"Soul"	Kevin Kadish; Tony Perrari	2:47
10.	"Sons and Daughters"	Brice; Ben Glover; Joe Leathers	3:05
11.	"Country Knows"	Marv Green; Lance Miller; Jimmy Yeary	3:36
12.	"Lies"	Scooter Carusoe; Tom Douglas	3:28
13.	"If You"	Brice; B. Davis; Wood	2:13
14.	"I Hope You're Happy Now" (Carly Pearce with Lee Brice)	Luke Combs; Randy Montana; Carly Pearce; Jonathan Singleton	3:19
15.	"Hey World" (featuring Blessing Offor)	Brice; Dan Davis; Wood	3:19

== Personnel ==
Adapted from liner notes.

- Lee Brice - dobro, acoustic guitar, electric guitar, keyboards, lead vocals, background vocals
- busbee - acoustic guitar
- Chris DeStefano - background vocals
- Kris Donegan - acoustic guitar, baritone guitar, electric guitar
- Ian Fitchuk - keyboards
- Paul Franklin - lap steel guitar
- Ben Glover - acoustic guitar, baritone guitar, electric guitar, keyboards, programming, background vocals
- Mark Hill - bass guitar
- Kyle Jacobs - acoustic guitar, background vocals
- Ben Johnson - programming
- Mike Leach - keyboards
- Josh Matheny - dobro
- Jerry McPherson - dobro, acoustic guitar, electric guitar
- Gordon Mote - keyboards
- Blessing Offor - duet vocals on "Hey World"
- Carly Pearce - duet vocals on "I Hope You're Happy Now"
- Paul Rippee - bass guitar
- Jerry Roe - drums
- Jimmie Lee Sloas - bass guitar
- Aaron Sterling - drums
- Ilya Toshinsky - acoustic guitar
- Derek Wells - acoustic guitar, baritone guitar, electric guitar
- Fred Williams - keyboards, programming
- Nir Z. - drums

== Charts ==
=== Weekly charts ===
Weekly chart performance for Hey World
Chart (2020)	Peak position
US Billboard 200	45
US Top Country Albums (Billboard)	8

=== Year-end charts ===
2021 year-end chart performance for Hey World
Chart (2021)	Position
Australian Country Albums (ARIA)	33
US Billboard 200	112
US Top Country Albums (Billboard)	10

2022 year-end chart performance for Hey World
Chart (2022)	Position
US Billboard 200	197
US Top Country Albums (Billboard)	18

2023 year-end chart performance for Hey World
Chart (2023)	Position
US Top Country Albums (Billboard)	38

== Certifications ==
Certifications for Hey World
Region	Certification	Certified units/sales
United States (RIAA)	Platinum	1,000,000^{‡}
^{‡} Sales+streaming figures based on certification alone.
