= One of Them Girls =

2020 single by Lee Brice

Single by Lee Brice

from the album Hey World
- Released: April 10, 2020
- Genre: Country
- Length: 3:07
- Label: Curb
- Songwriters: Lee Brice; Ashley Gorley; Dallas Davidson; Ben Johnson
- Producers: Lee Brice; Ben Glover; Kyle Jacobs

Lee Brice singles chronology
"I Hope You're Happy Now" (2019)	"One of Them Girls" (2020)	"Memory I Don't Mess With" (2020)

"One of Them Girls" is a song recorded by American country music singer Lee Brice. It is the lead single from his fifth studio album Hey World. Brice wrote the song with Ashley Gorley, Dallas Davidson, and Ben Johnson. It is the highest-charting song of his career on the Billboard Hot 100, peaking at #17.

== History ==
Tricia Desperes of Taste of Country described the song as "a summer-tinged song that tells of strong, confident girls who hold their hearts up as an armor of sorts, waiting for the right person who can take down their guard." Brice called co-writers Ashley Gorley, Dallas Davidson, and Ben Johnson the night before a songwriting session and presented them with the idea for the song; they finished it overnight and recorded it the next day. Brice released the single in early 2020 as the lead to his upcoming fifth studio album, and following on the success of his duet with Carly Pearce, "I Hope You're Happy Now".

The music video features a woman who is struggling to raise her daughter, and then ends up rescuing a man trapped inside his car.

== Charts ==
=== Weekly charts ===
Chart (2020)	Peak position
Canada Hot 100 (Billboard)	24
Canada Country (Billboard)	1
Global 200 (Billboard)	94
US Billboard Hot 100	17
US Country Airplay (Billboard)	1
US Hot Country Songs (Billboard)	2
US Rolling Stone Top 100	29

=== Year-end charts ===
Chart (2020)	Position
Canada (Canadian Hot 100)	71
US Billboard Hot 100	68
US Country Airplay (Billboard)	10
US Hot Country Songs (Billboard)	10

Chart (2021)	Position
US Country Airplay (Billboard)	60
US Hot Country Songs (Billboard)	85

== Certifications ==
Region	Certification	Certified units/sales
United Kingdom (BPI)	Silver	200,000^{‡}
United States (RIAA)	4× Platinum	4,000,000^{‡}
^{‡} Sales+streaming figures based on certification alone.
