= Love Like Crazy =

Studio album by Lee Brice
- Released: June 8, 2010
- Recorded: 2009–2010
- Genre: Country
- Length: 43:59
- Label: Curb Records
- Producers: Doug Johnson; Lee Brice "Four on the Floor" produced by Garrett Parris

Lee Brice chronology
Love Like Crazy (2010)	Hard 2 Love (2012)

Singles from Love Like Crazy
- 1. "Love Like Crazy" Released: August 24, 2009; 2. "Beautiful Every Time" Released: October 25, 2010

Professional ratings
Review scores
Source	Rating
Allmusic	2.5/5 stars
Roughstock	favorable
Engine 145	1.5/5 stars

Love Like Crazy is the debut studio album by American country music artist Lee Brice. It was released on June 8, 2010, by Curb Records. Prior to the album's release, Brice charted three singles: "She Ain't Right," "Happy Endings" and "Upper Middle Class White Trash." The album's title track debuted in August 2009. The album's second single "Beautiful Every Time" released to radio on October 25, 2010.

== Critical reception ==
Stephen Thomas Erlewine of Allmusic gave the album a two-and-a-half star rating out of five, criticizing the "pedestrian" production, but saying that Brice showed an "ability to seem like your own local boy made good." Giving it one-and-a-half stars out of five, Karlie Justus of Engine 145 thought that most of the songs were formulaic and the production "unpredictably jarring." Bobby Peacock of Roughstock was more positive, giving it four stars out of five. He thought that the songwriting was "cohesive" and that "Brice's irrefutable singing and songwriting talents come through clearly."

== Track listing ==
No.	Title	Writer(s)	Length
1.	"Picture of Me"	Lee Brice; Kyle Jacobs; Shaun Shankel	4:31
2.	"Love Like Crazy"	Doug Johnson; Tim James	3:37
3.	"Some Things"	James; Johnson	3:04
4.	"Power of a Woman"	Brice; Jacobs; John Nelson	3:40
5.	"Beautiful Every Time"	Brice; Rob Hatch; Lance Miller	3:30
6.	"She Ain't Right"	Michael Dulaney; Wendell Mobley; Neil Thrasher	3:12
7.	"Falling Apart Together"	Lamar Alexander; Brice; Billy Montana	3:45
8.	"Sumter County Friday Night"	Brice; Jon McElroy	3:55
9.	"Carolina Boys"	Brice	3:49
10.	"Four on the Floor"	Brice; Jacobs; Garrett Parris	3:30
11.	"These Last Few Days"	Brice; Andrew Dorff; McElroy	3:47
12.	"Happy Endings"	Brice; McElroy

== Personnel ==
Compiled from liner notes.

- Lee Brice – lead vocals, backing vocals (10)
- Jim "Moose" Brown – keyboards (1, 8, 9, 11, 12), Hammond B3 organ (1, 8, 9, 11, 12)
- Tony Harrell – acoustic piano (2), keyboards (6), Hammond B3 organ (6)
- Jamie Kenney – keyboards (3), Hammond B3 organ (3, 4), acoustic piano (4)
- Tim Akers – keyboards (4, 6), Hammond B3 organ (4, 6)
- Gordon Mote – acoustic piano (5, 7)
- Reggie Smith – Wurlitzer electric piano (5), Hammond B3 organ (5, 7)
- Buddy Hyatt – keyboards (10)
- Garrett Parris – programming (10), banjo (10), backing vocals (10)
- Troy Lancaster – electric guitar (1, 3–5, 8, 9, 11, 12)
- Bryan Sutton – acoustic guitar (1, 6, 8, 9, 11, 12)
- Pat Buchanan – electric guitar (2)
- Gary Burnette – acoustic guitar (2)
- Jerry Kimbrough – electric guitar (3)
- Pat McGrath – acoustic guitar (3)
- Tom Bukovac – acoustic guitar (4)
- Travis Bettis – electric guitar (5, 7)
- Ryan Wariner – electric guitar (5)
- Biff Watson – acoustic guitar (5, 7)
- J. T. Corenflos – electric guitar (6)
- Chris Leuzinger – acoustic guitar (6), electric guitar (6)
- Jon McElroy – electric guitar (8)
- Rich Herring – acoustic guitar (10)
- Jeff King – electric guitar (10)
- Mike Johnson – steel guitar (1, 6, 8, 9, 11, 12)
- Dan Dugmore – steel guitar (2)
- Scotty Sanders – steel guitar (3, 4)
- Bobby Terry – steel guitar (5)
- Russ Pahl – steel guitar (10)
- Jimmie Lee Sloas – bass (1, 3–9, 11, 12)
- Steve Mackey – bass (2)
- Duncan Mullins – bass (10)
- Brian Pruitt – drums (1, 6, 8, 9, 11, 12)
- Greg Morrow – drums (2)
- Dennis Holt – drums (3, 4)
- Lonnie Wilson – drums (5, 7)
- Steve Brewster – drums (10)
- Jonathan Yudkin – strings (4)
- Perry Coleman – backing vocals (1–9, 12)
- Chip Davis – backing vocals (5)
- Gale Mayes – backing vocals (5)
- Angela Primm – backing vocals (5)
- Kyle Jacobs – backing vocals (10)
- Kylie Sackley – backing vocals (10–12)

== Chart performance ==
=== Album ===
Love Like Crazy debuted on the U.S. Billboard 200 at No. 44 and at No. 9 on the U.S. Billboard Top Country Albums chart. As of July 24, 2010, the album has sold 32,357 copies.

Chart (2010)	Peak position
U.S. Billboard 200	44
U.S. Billboard Top Country Albums	9

=== Year-end charts ===
Chart (2010)	Year-end 2010
US Billboard Top Country Albums	65

=== Singles ===
Year	Single	Peak chart positions			Certifications (sales threshold)
Year	Single	US Country	US	CAN	Certifications (sales threshold)
2009	"Love Like Crazy"	3	45	77	US: Platinum
2010	"Beautiful Every Time"	30	—	—	
"—" denotes releases that did not chart

== Certifications ==
Region	Certification	Certified units/sales
United States (RIAA)	Gold	500,000^{‡}
^{‡} Sales+streaming figures based on certification alone.
