= A Woman Like You (Lee Brice song) =

Single by Lee Brice

from the album Hard 2 Love
- Released: October 17, 2011
- Recorded: 2011
- Genre: Country
- Length: 3:29
- Label: Curb
- Songwriters: Jon Stone; Phil Barton; Johnny Bulford
- Producers: Lee Brice; Jon Stone

Lee Brice singles chronology
"Beautiful Every Time" (2010)	"A Woman Like You" (2011)	"Hard to Love" (2012)

"A Woman Like You" is a song written by Jon Stone, Phil Barton and Johnny Bulford and recorded by American country music artist Lee Brice. It was released in October 2011 as the first single from Brice's album Hard 2 Love. The song is about the singer being questioned by his wife about what he would've done with his life had he not fell in love with her.

The song received generally positive reviews from critics for its heart-warming lyrics and Lee's affable delivery. "A Woman Like You" would give Brice the first of four number-one hits on the Billboard Country Airplay chart. It also became his first Top 40 hit on the Billboard Hot 100 at number 33 and number 49 on the Canadian Hot 100. The song was certified 3× Platinum by the Recording Industry Association of America (RIAA) and single Platinum by Music Canada for selling over an amount of units from their respective countries.

The accompanying music video for the song was directed by Eric Welch and features actress Meaghan Pocock playing Brice's wife in the video.

== Content ==
In "A Woman Like You", the narrator is asked by his wife what he would do if he had never fallen in love with her. He lists several hobbies and pastimes but says that, if he had not fallen in love, he would be "lookin' for a woman like you." The song is in cut time and the key of G major, with a major chord pattern of G-Em-C-Am-D.

== Critical reception ==
Billy Dukes of Taste of Country gave the song four and a half stars out of five, saying that "the simple and reserved attitude Brice approaches the song with is a good reflection of the love story he describes." Allen Jacobs of Roughstock gave the song four stars out of five, writing that "Lee continues to show off a charming personality and vocal style that just makes 'A Woman Like You' an easy song to like." Ben Foster of Country Universe gave the song a B− grade, saying that "it's a very pretty-sounding tune, to be sure, but the lyrics just don't quite add up."

== Music video ==
The music video was directed by Eric Welch and premiered in December 2011. The actress in the music video is Meaghan Pocock.

== Chart performance ==
"A Woman Like You" debuted at number 60 on the U.S. Billboard Hot Country Songs chart for the week of October 22, 2011. It became Lee Brice's first career number one hit for the week of April 21, 2012.

Chart (2011–2012)	Peak position
Canada Hot 100 (Billboard)	49
Canada Country (Billboard)	3
US Billboard Hot 100	33
US Hot Country Songs (Billboard)	1

=== Year-end charts ===
Chart (2012)	Position
US Country Songs (Billboard)	22

== Certifications ==
Region	Certification	Certified units/sales
Canada (Music Canada)	Platinum	80,000^{*}
United States (RIAA)	3× Platinum	3,000,000^{‡}
^{*} Sales figures based on certification alone.^{‡} Sales+streaming figures based on certification alone.
