= Hard to Love (Lee Brice song) =

Single by Lee Brice

from the album Hard 2 Love
- Released: May 14, 2012
- Genre: Country
- Length: 3:40 (album version); 3:33 (pop version)
- Label: Curb
- Songwriters: Billy Montana; John Ozier; Ben Glover
- Producers: Kyle Jacobs; Matt McClure

Lee Brice singles chronology
| "A Woman Like You" (2011) | "Hard to Love" (2012) | "I Drive Your Truck" (2012) |

"Hard to Love" is a song written by Billy Montana, John Ozier, and Ben Glover and recorded by American country music artist Lee Brice. It was released on May 14, 2012 as the second single from Brice's album Hard 2 Love.

The song received positive reviews from critics who praised Brice's performance of someone else's lyrics. "Hard to Love" gave Brice his second number-one country hit on the US Billboard Country Airplay chart. It also peaked at numbers 4 and 27 on the Hot Country Songs and Hot 100 charts, respectively. It received minor chart success in Canada, peaking at number 51 on the Canadian Hot 100. The song was certified Platinum by both the Recording Industry Association of America (RIAA) and Music Canada for selling over a number of units from their respective countries.

The accompanying music video for the song was directed by Eric Welch.

== Content ==
In the song, the male narrator states that he is "hard to love" and questions why his lover still tolerates him. Co-writer Ben Glover said, "We thought we’d write a classic song about dudes saying, ‘You know I’m kind of a pain in the ass.’ We said, ‘Let’s just talk about ourselves in the song'".

== Critical reception ==
Billy Dukes of Taste of Country gave "Hard to Love" three and a half stars out of five, writing that "the song doesn’t come to life as easily as some others Brice has performed or written" but "Brice should have no trouble finding his way up the charts." Ashley Cooke of Roughstock gave the song four stars out of five, saying that "although Brice didn’t write this song, he’s done a great job at finding one that fits his sound and his style."

== Music video ==
The music video was directed by Eric Welch and premiered in April 2012. A pop version of this song was released on April 11, 2014.

== Official versions ==
- Album version (3:40)
- Pop version (3:33)
- Acoustic version (3:07)

== Chart performance ==
"Hard to Love" debuted at number 51 on the U.S. Billboard Hot Country Songs chart for the week of May 26, 2012. The song became Brice's second number one hit on Country Airplay for the week of November 10, 2012, where it stayed for two weeks.

| Chart (2012) | Peak position |
|---|---|
| Canada Hot 100 (Billboard) | 51 |
| Canada Country (Billboard) | 2 |
| US Billboard Hot 100 | 27 |
| US Country Airplay (Billboard) | 1 |
| US Hot Country Songs (Billboard) | 4 |

=== Year-end charts ===
| Chart (2012) | Position |
|---|---|
| US Billboard Hot 100 | 95 |
| US Hot Country Songs (Billboard) | 18 |

| Chart (2013) | Position |
|---|---|
| US Hot Country Songs (Billboard) | 68 |

== Certifications ==
| Region | Certification | Certified units/sales |
|---|---|---|
| Canada (Music Canada) | Platinum | 80,000^{*} |
| United States (RIAA) | 5× Platinum | 5,000,000^{‡} |
^{*} Sales figures based on certification alone.^{‡} Sales+streaming figures based on certification alone.
