= Lee Brice =

American singer-songwriter (born 1979)

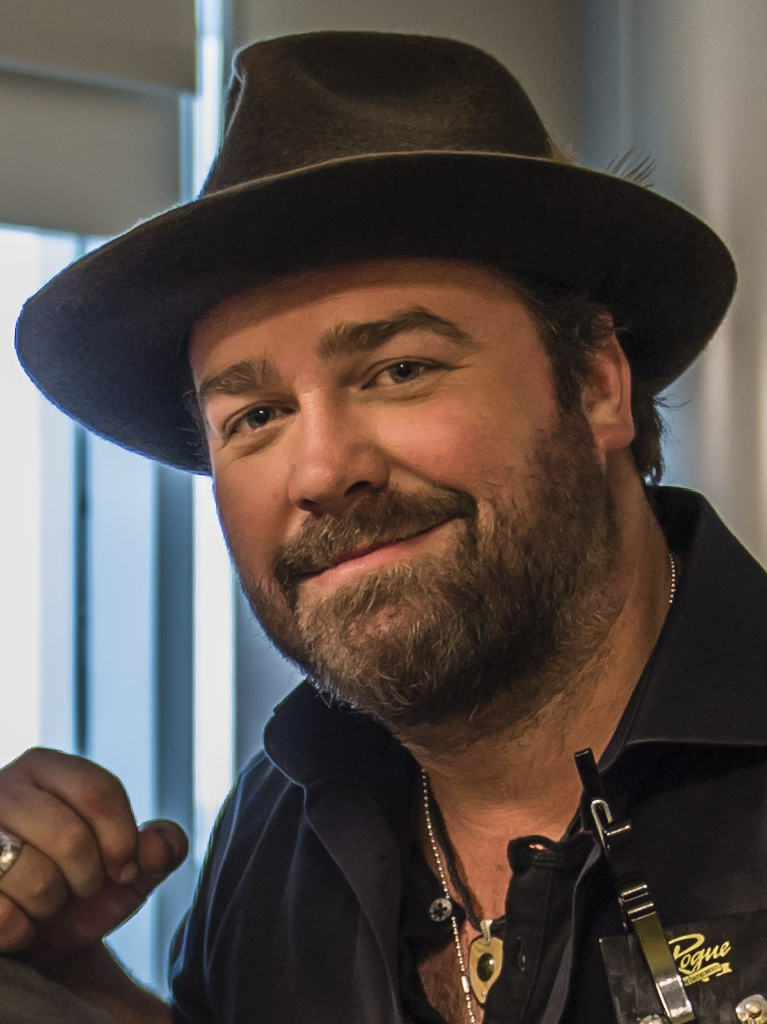
- Brice in 2017

Background information
- Born: Kenneth Mobley Brice Jr. June 10, 1979 (age 47); Sumter, South Carolina, U.S.
- Origin: Sumter, South Carolina
- Genres: Country
- Occupations: Singer; songwriter
- Instruments: Vocals; guitar
- Years active: 2007–present
- Label: Curb
- Website: leebrice.com

Kenneth Mobley "Lee" Brice Jr. (born June 10, 1979) is a country music singer and songwriter, signed to Curb Records. Brice has released five albums with the label: Love Like Crazy, Hard to Love, I Don't Dance, Lee Brice, and Hey World. He has also released eighteen singles, of which eight have reached number one on Billboard Country Airplay: "A Woman Like You", "Hard to Love", "I Drive Your Truck", "I Don't Dance", "Rumor", "I Hope You're Happy Now", "One of Them Girls" and "Memory I Don't Mess With". He has also charted within the top 10 with "Love Like Crazy", "Parking Lot Party", "Drinking Class", and "That Don't Sound Like You". "Love Like Crazy" was the top country song of 2010 according to Billboard Year-End, and broke a 62-year-old record for the longest run on the country chart. He performed at Turning Point USA's All-American Halftime Show in 2026.

Besides his own material, he has also co-written singles for artists like Garth Brooks, Adam Gregory, the Eli Young Band, and Tim McGraw. One of his compositions, Brooks's "More Than a Memory", was the first song ever to debut at number one on the country chart, while the Eli Young Band's "Crazy Girl" was the Billboard Year-End top country song of 2011.

== Early life ==
Kenneth Mobley Brice Jr. was born on June 10, 1979, in Sumter, South Carolina, to Kenneth Sr. and Carleen Brice His younger brother, Lewis, was a contestant on Season 1 of Country Music Television's Can You Duet. As a child, he played piano and guitar, sang in church, and wrote his own songs. He entered and won three different talent contests in high school.

He attended Clemson University on a football scholarship. He played special teams there as the long snapper, but after an arm injury, he decided to focus on a country music career.

== Musical career ==
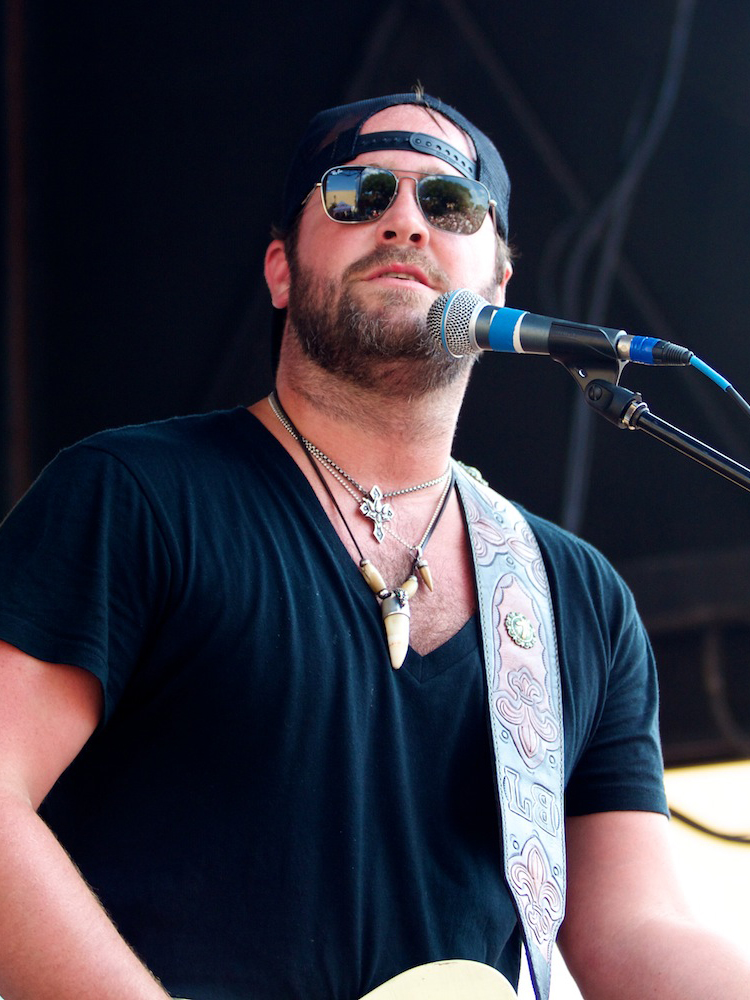
Brice at Billy Bob's Texas for Willie Nelson's 4th of July Picnic in 2011

By 2007, Brice began working as a songwriter, with cuts by Jason Aldean, Keith Gattis, and Cowboy Crush among others. Along with Billy Montana and Kyle Jacobs, he co-wrote Garth Brooks's 2007 single "More Than a Memory", the first single in the history of the Billboard Hot Country Songs chart to debut at number one.

Later that year, he signed to Curb Records, releasing his debut single "She Ain't Right", which peaked at number 29 on the country chart. It was followed by "Happy Endings" and "Upper Middle Class White Trash" at numbers 32 and 44. All three songs were to have been included on an album entitled Picture of Me, which was never released. He continued to write songs for others, including Canadian singer Adam Gregory's singles "Crazy Days" and "What It Takes". He appeared on Cledus T. Judd's 2007 album Boogity, Boogity – A Tribute to the Comedic Genius of Ray Stevens, singing duet vocals on a rendition of the Albert E. Brumley gospel song "Turn Your Radio On".

=== 2009–2010: Love Like Crazy ===
In August 2009, he charted with his fourth single, "Love Like Crazy", a song written by Tim James and Doug Johnson. It was the first release from his debut album of the same name, on which he co-produced all but one track with Johnson. "Love Like Crazy" reached top 10 on the Hot Country Songs chart in July 2010 during its forty-sixth week on the chart, setting a record for the slowest climb into the top 10. In September 2010, the song charted for a fifty-sixth week, making it the longest-charting song in the chart's history; it broke a record set by Eddy Arnold, whose 1948 single "Bouquet of Roses" spent fifty-four weeks on the chart. "Love Like Crazy" ultimately peaked at number 3. The album's second single was "Beautiful Every Time" at number 30. Also in 2010, Brice co-wrote labelmate Tim McGraw's single "Still".

=== 2011–2019: Hard 2 Love, I Don't Dance and Lee Brice ===
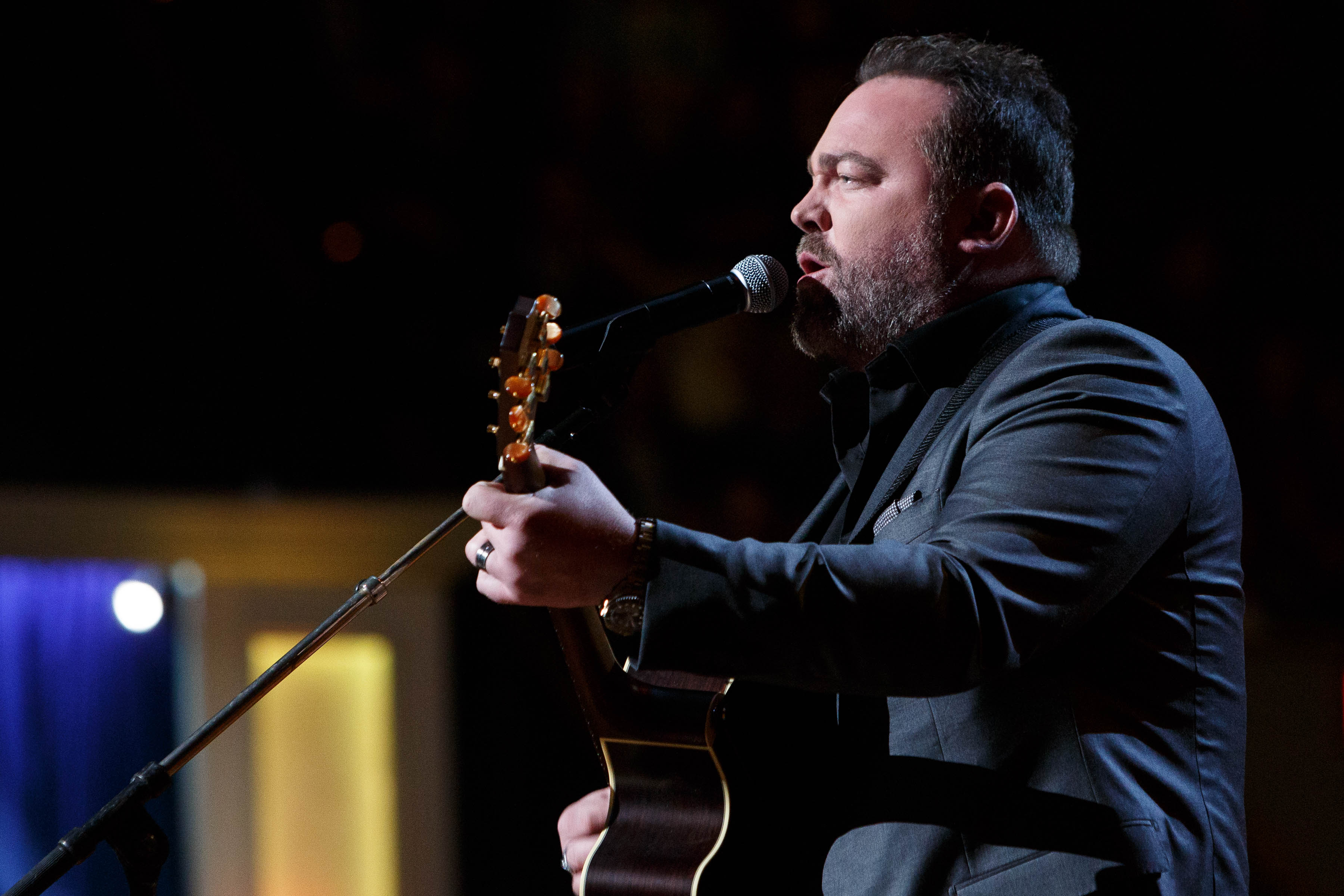
Brice performs in 2020

Brice released his sixth single, "A Woman Like You", in late 2011. It was the first release from a second album for Curb, Hard 2 Love, which was released on April 24, 2012. In April 2012, it became his first number one on the Country Airplay chart. "Hard to Love" became his second number one in late 2012. The album's third single, "I Drive Your Truck", was released on December 3, 2012, and reached number one on the Country Airplay chart in 2013. The album's fourth single, "Parking Lot Party", was released to country radio on May 13, 2013, and peaked at number 6 on the Country Airplay chart in November 2013. Brice also co-produced the single "Love Is War" for the duo American Young, a duo whose membership includes "A Woman Like You" co-writer Jon Stone.

In early 2014, Brice released the single "I Don't Dance". It was the lead single to his third studio album of the same name, which was released on September 9, 2014. Brice produced the album by himself. "I Don't Dance" became Brice's fourth number one hit in August 2014. "Drinking Class" is the album's second single. It peaked at number two on the Country Airplay chart in May 2015. The album's third single, "That Don't Sound Like You" released to country radio on May 11, 2015. During this time, he also toured on a very busy schedule, doing over 100 live shows every year between 2011 and 2016.

On November 3, 2017, Brice released the self-titled album, Lee Brice. It is his fourth album and it was released via Curb Records. The album's lead single is "Boy" and features 14 other songs.

In October 2019, Carly Pearce released a duet with Brice titled "I Hope You're Happy Now."

=== 2020–present: Hey World ===
In April 2020, Brice released the single, "One of Them Girls", as the lead-off single to his fifth studio album, Hey World, due for release November 20, 2020. "One of Them Girls" spent three weeks at number one on the Billboard Country Airplay chart in October 2020, becoming Brice's longest-lasting number one to date. In early 2023, Brice embarked on his headlining "Beer Drinking Opportunity Tour" in Canada, alongside Tenille Arts and Josh Ross.

On February 8, 2026, Brice performed at Turning Point USA's All-American Halftime Show alongside Kid Rock, Brantley Gilbert, and Gabby Barrett, performing "Drinking Class", the live debut of "Country Nowadays", and "Hard to Love". His performance of "Country Nowadays" became an internet meme, as some viewers interpreted his opening lyrics (I just wanna catch my fish) as "I just wanna kiss my fish". In April 2026, Brice embarked on his headlining "Sunriser Tour" across Canada with support from Brett Kissel.

== Personal life ==
In April 2013, Brice married his longtime girlfriend Sara Nanette Reeveley. The couple have three children: sons Takoda Brice (born in 2008) and Ryker Mobley Brice (born in 2013), and daughter Trulee Nanette Brice (born in 2017). Brice's cousin and often music inspiration, Michael Cericola, serves as the children's godfather. Reeveley is featured on the track "See About a Girl" on Hard 2 Love.

On November 8, 2020, Brice announced that he tested positive for COVID-19 during the ongoing pandemic, but was asymptomatic. As a result, he was unable to perform with Carly Pearce on their single, "I Hope You're Happy Now", at the 54th CMA Awards, and Charles Kelley of Lady A performed with Pearce instead.

== Discography ==
Studio albums

- Love Like Crazy (2010)
- Hard 2 Love (2012)
- I Don't Dance (2014)
- Lee Brice (2017)
- Hey World (2020)
- Sunriser (2026)

== Songs written by Lee Brice ==
Year	Title	Artist	Album
2006	"Beautiful High"	Sister Hazel	Absolutely
2007	"Not Every Man Lives"	Jason Aldean	Relentless
2007	"More Than a Memory"	Garth Brooks	The Ultimate Hits
2008	"All Said and Done", "Love Finds Everyone"	Cory Morrow	Vagrants & Kings
2008	"Tougher Than a Man"	Cowboy Crush	Cowboy Crush
2009	"Crazy Days", "What It Takes", "Down the Road"	Adam Gregory	Crazy Days
2009	"Sorry Don't Matter"	Jason Michael Carroll	Growing Up Is Getting Old
2009	"Just Fine"	Bomshel	Fight Like a Girl
2009	"Still"	Tim McGraw	Southern Voice
2010	"You'll Always Be Beautiful"	Blake Shelton	Hillbilly Bone
2010	"Homemade Mexico"	Trailer Choir	Tailgate
2010	"Seven Days"	Kenny Chesney	Hemingway's Whiskey
2011	"Baby Blue Eyes"	Josh Kelley	Georgia Clay
2011	"All Night to Get There"	Craig Campbell	Craig Campbell
2011	"Where Did I Lose You"	Mark Wills	Looking for America
2011	"Crazy Girl", "I Love You"	Eli Young Band	Life at Best
2012	"Only God Could Love You More", "Shinin' on Me"	Jerrod Niemann	Free the Music
2012	"Back Home"	Charles Esten	The Music of Nashville, Season 1: The Complete Collection
2013	"Absolutely Nothing"	Randy Houser	How Country Feels
2013	"Wish I Had a Boat"	Tyler Farr	Redneck Crazy
2013	"Get Up"	Robin Meade	Count on Me
2014	"Buzz Back Girl", "We Know How to Rock"	Jerrod Niemann	High Noon
2014	"Wasn't Gonna Drink Tonight"	American Young	American Young (EP)
2016	"Boy"	Faith Hill	Deep Tracks

== Awards and nominations ==
Year	Association	Category	Result
2011	Academy of Country Music Awards	Song of the Year — "Love Like Crazy" (as the Artist)	Nominated
2011	Academy of Country Music Awards	Single Record of the Year — "Love Like Crazy"	Nominated
2011	CMT Music Awards	USA Weekend Breakthrough Video of the Year — "Love Like Crazy"	Nominated
2012	ACM Awards	Song of the Year - "Crazy Girl"	Won
2012	Country Music Association Awards	New Artist of the Year	Nominated
2013	ACM Awards	Top New Male Artist	Nominated
2013	ACM Awards	Song of the Year — "A Woman Like You" (as the Artist)	Nominated
2013	CMA Awards	New Artist of the Year	Nominated
2014	Grammy Awards	Best Country Solo Performance — "I Drive Your Truck"	Nominated
2014	ACM Awards	Single Record of the Year - "I Drive Your Truck	Nominated
2014	ACM Awards	Song of the Year - "I Drive Your Truck" (as the Artist)	Won
2014	ACM Awards	Video of the Year - "I Drive Your Truck"	Nominated
2014	ACM Awards	Male Vocalist of the Year	Nominated
2014	CMA Awards	Song of the Year — "I Don't Dance"	Nominated
2015	ACM Awards	Single Record of the Year - "I Don't Dance"	Won
2015	CMA Awards	Single of the Year — "I Don't Dance"	Nominated
2020	ACM Awards	Single of the Year - "Rumor"	Nominated
2020	CMA Awards	Musical Event of the Year	Won
2020	CMA Awards	Video of the Year	Nominated
