= Music of Kansas =

For decades, Kansas has had a thriving country and bluegrass scene. The Country Stampede Music Festival – one of the largest music festivals in the country – and the bluegrass/acoustic Walnut Valley Festival illustrate the continued popularity of these music genres in the state. Among current leading country artists are Martina McBride, Chely Wright, Jerrod Niemann, and Logan Mize, natives of Kansas.

The state has also fostered some rock acts – the one that is most associated with the state is almost certainly the hard rock band Kansas. Some famous and pioneering jazz musicians also had roots in Kansas.

== History ==
=== Pre-19th century ===
The first music performed in the area that is now Kansas was that of the Indigenous peoples who lived there.

=== 19th century ===
The earliest documented music comes after settlement by Anglo-Americans in the 1850s. One of the first musical works relating to Kansas was "Ho! For the Kansas Plains", a song written by James G. Clark in the 1850s, which mythologized the territory as the site of abolitionist battles during the Bleeding Kansas era. A representative lyric was "Ho! For the Kansas plains; Where men shall live in liberty; Free from the tyrant's chains." Along the same lines, some versions of the famous Civil War marching song "John Brown's Body" refer to John Brown's abolitionist activities in Kansas Territory during the same era.

Following the Civil War, as Kansas became known more for its cowboys, saloons and wide-open spaces, another notable song written in and about Kansas was "Home on the Range". It was penned in the state in the 1870s, and then spread throughout the American Old West as an unofficial anthem. It is now Kansas's official state song. The song established something of a template for Kansas music, and over the next several decades, music coming from Kansas remained in a similar folk or old-time music style, while lyrics referencing the state tended to focus on its open countryside.

=== Early 20th century ===
Composer and musician Nathaniel Clark Smith, born at Fort Leavenworth, was an important music educator and bandleader in the early 1900s who led bands in Wichita and Kansas City and taught many jazz musicians such as vibraphonist Lionel Hampton. In the 1920s, the Kansas City jazz scene developed in eastern Kansas. Saxophonist and bandleader Coleman Hawkins, who introduced the tenor saxophone and bebop to jazz, was raised in Topeka, and began touring in eastern Kansas by 1918 at age fourteen, later collaborating with jazz legends Thelonious Monk, Dizzy Gillespie, and Miles Davis. Jazz and blues singer Ada Brown was born and raised in Kansas City, where she also released one of the first Kansas City jazz singles, "Evil Mama Blues". Drummer and bandleader Kansas Fields was born in Chapman and played with many jazz artists such as Gillespie and Ella Fitzgerald. Pianist, singer, and bandleader Joe Sanders was born in Thayer and performed in the Coon-Sanders Original Nighthawk Orchestra with drummer Carlton Coon. Harpist Betty Glamann was born in Wellington and played with musicians Duke Ellington, John Coltrane, and Davis. Singer and composer Nora Holt, a figure in the Harlem Renaissance and the co-founder of the National Association of Negro Musicians, was born in Kansas City. Choral conductor Eva Jessye, a contemporary of Holt and also an active Harlem Renaissance musician, was born in Coffeyville. Famous bandleader and pianist Stan Kenton, born in Wichita, released swing jazz records with his longtime band, the Stan Kenton Jazz Orchestra, and ran summer jazz programs for students in the 1950s and 60s known as the Stan Kenton Band Clinics. Saxophonist and jazz bandleader Charlie Parker, known for jazz standards such as "Now's the Time" and "Donna Lee", also came to prominence in Kansas City, having been born and raised there. Rhythm and blues pianist Jesse Stone was born in Atchison and wrote the 1954 rock and roll hit "Shake, Rattle, and Roll". Outsider musician and composer Moondog was born in Marysville and later became known for his avant-garde and jazz music performances on the streets of New York City.

=== 1960s ===
In the 1960s, R&B, blue-eyed soul, and garage rock bands became popular in cities such as Hays and Lawrence with acts such as the Fabulous Flippers, The Blue Things, the Red Dogs, The Serfs, Eric & The Norsemen, The Sensational Showmen, Wade Flemons, and Mike Finnigan traveling the Midwest and releasing regional singles. Gene Clark, from Tipton, Missouri and a founding member of The Byrds, attended high school in Bonner Springs and began performing in the state.

=== 1970s ===
Hard prog rock band Kansas emerged from Topeka in 1973 and signed to Kirshner Records. They gained their most successful albums and songs throughout the 1970s. In 1976, Kansas released their quintuple-platinum album Leftoverture, featuring the hard rock classic "Carry On Wayward Son", which hit #11 on the Billboard Hot 100 in 1977. Later that year, the band released their quadruple-platinum album, Point of Know Return, featuring the soft rock song "Dust in the Wind", which reached #6 on the Hot 100 in 1978. Their success continued into the 1980s with mainstream rock hits such as "Hold On," "Play the Game Tonight," "Fight Fire with Fire," and "All I Wanted." Kansas continues to record and tour after over fifty years.

Joe Walsh of Eagles and James Gang fame is a native of Wichita, although he spent his youth in Columbus, Ohio. Walsh released hit singles such as "Rocky Mountain Way" in 1973 and "Life's Been Good" in 1978. Stanley Sheldon, a bassist from Ottawa, played with UK rocker Peter Frampton at the height of his career in the mid-1970s, including the top selling live concert album Frampton Comes Alive! Sheldon contributed as both bassist and songwriter on Frampton's instrumental album Fingerprints, which was a Grammy winner in 2007.

In the mid-1970s, the Wichita funk group and family band Rudy Love and the Love Family released singles such as "Does Your Mama Know" and "This Song Is For You." Rudy Love had also collaborated with funk musician Sly Stone for his 1975 album High On You. Rapper Jay-Z later sampled "Does Your Mama Know" in his song "Sweet" for his 2007 album American Gangster, with Love's permission.

Alto saxophonist Bobby Watson, born in Lawrence and raised in Kansas City, led several jazz bands such as The Jazz Messengers and Bobby Watson & Horizon starting in 1977 and most recently was the director of jazz studies at University of Missouri-Kansas City. Jazz guitarist Jerry Hahn grew up in Wichita and graduated from Wichita State University in 1962. He taught jazz guitar at Wichita State from 1972 to 1986 and established WSU's jazz guitar degree program.

=== 1980s ===
In the early 1980s, Wichita, Topeka, and Lawrence, together with Kansas City, Missouri, had a significant hardcore punk scene, centered at Lawrence's University of Kansas campus, and later at the Outhouse. Among the most popular bands were The Embarrassment, Get Smart!, and Mortal Micronotz.

Katrina Leskanich, from Topeka, sang lead vocals and played guitar for Katrina and the Waves in the 1980s and 1990s. The band's most popular song, "Walking on Sunshine," was a Top 10 hit worldwide in 1985.

Grammy and Dove Award-winning Christian music guitarist Phil Keaggy moved to Leawood in 1979 and spent the next several years there releasing solo CCM albums for Sparrow Records and Nissi Records, including his 1983 self-produced album Underground. From 1984 to 1988, both Kansas's lead guitarist Kerry Livgren and bassist Dave Hope, both from Topeka, performed in their own Christian rock band, AD, featuring vocalist and multi-instrumentalist Michael Gleason from Wichita. The band toured and released several albums together, including the 1984 album Time Line and the 1988 album Prime Mover, the latter of which Livgren remixed and remastered as Prime Mover II in 1998 and Prime Mover Redux in 2008.

Dawayne Bailey, a native of Manhattan, Kansas, toured and recorded with Detroit rock legend Bob Seger and the classic rock band Chicago. American rock band Shooting Star, notable for being the first American act signed by Virgin Records, hailed from Overland Park and had several moderately successful rock singles in the early 1980s.

=== 1990s ===
One of the most popular country singers to come from Kansas is Martina McBride. Originally from Sharon, Kansas, McBride made her breakthrough in 1993 with her second album, The Way That I Am, featuring her signature songs and top 20 hits "My Baby Loves Me" and "Independence Day". She scored her first #1 hit on the US Billboard Hot Country Songs chart in 1996 with "Wild Angels" from her 1995 album of the same name. McBride made more top selling albums and #1 hits throughout the 1990s and 2000s, including the platinum albums The Way that I Am, Wild Angels, Evolution, Emotion, Greatest Hits, and Martina, and the singles "A Broken Wing", "Wrong Again", "I Love You", "Blessed," and "This One's for the Girls". Another notable country artist, Chely Wright, from Wellsville, released her first top 20 country hit in 1997, "Shut Up and Drive", from the album Let Me In. She reached #1 in 1999 with "Single White Female" from the album of the same name.

In the 1990s, Kansas produced some bands that found regional and national success taking the predominant grunge aesthetic and adding a rockabilly or country music twang, a style sometimes grouped into alternative country.

Paw, out of Lawrence, became the most well-known of these bands following the 1993 release of their major-label album Dragline. Truck Stop Love, out of Manhattan, Kansas, had a somewhat similar sound and was also signed to a national label, Scotti Brothers Records, with the well-received How I Spent My Summer Vacation being an appropriate swan song. The Moving Van Goghs, also from Manhattan, with a psychedelic/rock aesthetic, is also a notable band during the "pre-grunge" time period in the Kansas music scene. Finally, Kill Creek, a Lawrence band since the 1980s period was signed by Mammoth Recordings and achieved critical national attention with three full LPs and an EP. The sound of these bands was comparable to some Neil Young and their out-of-state contemporaries Dinosaur Jr. and Nirvana. Additionally, the indie all-girl rock band Frogpond found success in the late 90s with the 1996 album Count to Ten, produced by Everclear's lead singer Art Alexakis, and the 1999 album Safe Ride Home, while opening for pop rock bands like The Goo Goo Dolls and Fastball. Other bands from Kansas signed during the same period included Shiner, Sin City Disciples, Season to Risk, and Arthur Dodge and the Horsefeathers. Early contemporaries included The Pedaljets, a band fronted by Mike Allmayer who later formed Grither. The Pedaljets put out two LPs, Today Today (Twilight), The Pedaljets (Communion), and one 45 (Throbbing Lobster). Both albums received critical national attention. The Pedaljets toured the US extensively from 1984 to 1990, often opening for Hüsker Dü, The Flaming Lips, Soul Asylum, The Replacements, Meat Puppets, and other well known alternative bands of the 1980s. Late contemporaries included Grither, Zoom, Vitreous Humor, The Believe it or Nots, and Stick. Notable musicians of this time to come from Kansas are Mark Hart, Danny Carey, Kliph Scurlock, and Brody Buster.

Rock singer Melissa Etheridge, from Leavenworth, released multi-platinum albums, such as Yes I Am in 1993 and Your Little Secret in 1995, both of which produced several top 40 hits. Jennifer Knapp, born in Chanute, is a Grammy-nominated, Dove Award-winning Christian folk rock musician whose first album, Kansas, released in 1998, was certified gold.

DVS Mindz was an underground hip hop group formed in Topeka in 1993, known for their skilled lyricism and high-energy concerts. The group maintained a strong fan following in Topeka, Lawrence, and Kansas City. They released their debut album Million Dolla Broke Niggaz in 2000 on CD and streaming. DVS Mindz opened for numerous successful rappers and hip-hop groups during the 1990s and 2000s, such as The Sugarhill Gang, Run-DMC, Digital Underground, and the Wu-Tang Clan, and contributed to the rise of Midwest hip hop in the 2000s.

=== 2000s ===
The new popularity of Midwest hip-hop also helped Kansas rappers experience success. Rapper and producer Emcee N.I.C.E., from Topeka, first rapped in the group KansasCali and produced Nas and 2Pac's 2002 single "Thugz Mansion" before starting his solo career. After becoming a born-again Christian, his gospel singles "I Got Angels" and "Glory to God" reached #1 on the US Billboard Gospel Digital Song Sales in 2017 and 2018 and reached the top 20 on several other hip-hop and Christian music charts. Rapper XV, from Wichita, released mixtapes such as Everybody's Nobody and Zero Heroes in 2008 and 2009, which helped him gain underground success in the hip-hop community. Known for his clean rap style and his fan base, The Squarians, XV has collaborated with many successful rappers, such as Bun B, Lil Wayne, Big Sean, and Wiz Khalifa.

Several Kansas bands also gained notoriety throughout the 2000s. Power pop band Ultimate Fakebook had some success with their albums This Will Be Laughing Week in 2000 and Open Up and Say "Awesome" in 2002. Jazz hip-hop and funk rock band Pomeroy released albums including Cocoon Club in 2001 and A New Reflection in 2007, featuring the single "The Beat Goes On", which received regular airplay on Hot AC Top 40 radio nationwide. Indie pop duo Mates of State released the albums Re-Arrange Us in 2008, Crushes in 2010, and Mountaintops in 2011, all three making the top 10 on the US Billboard Heatseekers charts while also charting on the Billboard 200 and the Independent Albums charts. Emo band The Appleseed Cast found success with their albums Low Level Owl: Volume I and Volume II in 2001 and Peregrine in 2006.

=== 2010s ===
Country singer-songwriter Jerrod Niemann, from Liberal, released his first major-label album Judge Jerrod & the Hung Jury in 2010, which hit #1 on the Top Country Albums chart and featured the platinum-certified #1 hit single, "Lover, Lover," the gold-certified top 5 single, "What Do You Want", and the top 20 song "One More Drinkin' Song". In 2014, his third major-label album, High Noon, reached #3 on the charts and included his second platinum-certified #1 hit, "Drink to That All Night." Another country singer-songwriter, Logan Mize, from Clearwater, experienced moderate success and airplay on SiriusXM's country music station, The Highway, with the albums Nobody in Nashville, Pawn Shop Guitar, and Come Back Road, and the singles "Can't Get Away from a Good Time," "Ain't Always Pretty," and RIAA-certified gold singles "Better Off Gone" and "Grew Apart." Country rock singer-songwriter Jake Gill, from Hutchinson, released hit singles and fan favorites "Kansas Queen" in 2014, "Baby I'm On It" in 2017, "Crazy Girl" in 2022, and "Sun's Out Guns Out" in 2025. Jake Gill opened for Jason Aldean at the 2013 Country Stampede Music Festival, and he has also shared the stage with Easton Corbin, Jake Owen, and Chris Cagle.

Singer and rapper Janelle Monáe, from Kansas City, gained R&B hits and pop hits, including a guest performance on the 2011 #1 hit song "We Are Young" by the pop rock band Fun. Her albums The Electric Lady and Dirty Computer, released in 2013 and 2018, also reached the top 10 on the US Billboard 200 charts.

== Musical venues in Kansas ==
The following are alphabetical lists of notable venues located in Kansas that regularly host musical acts.

=== Concert halls, theaters, and opera houses ===
- Century II Convention Hall – Wichita
- The Cotillion – Wichita
- Fox Theatre – Hutchinson
- The Granada – Lawrence
- Liberty Hall – Lawrence
- Lied Center of Kansas – Lawrence
- Manhattan Arts Center – Manhattan
- McCain Auditorium – Manhattan
- McPherson Opera House – McPherson
- Memorial Auditorium – Pittsburg
- Memorial Hall – Hutchinson
- Memorial Hall – Kansas City
- Orpheum Theatre – Wichita
- Stiefel Theatre – Salina
- TempleLive! – Wichita
- Topeka Performing Arts Center – Topeka
- Twilight Theatre – Greensburg
- Wareham Hall – Manhattan
- Yardley Hall – Overland Park

=== Indoor arenas ===
- Allen Fieldhouse – Lawrence
- Bramlage Coliseum – Manhattan
- Charles Koch Arena – Wichita
- Heartland Credit Union Arena – Park City
- Hutchinson Sports Arena – Hutchinson
- Intrust Bank Arena – Wichita
- Kansas Star Arena – Mulvane
- Stormont Vail Events Center – Topeka
- Tony's Pizza Events Center – Salina
- United Wireless Arena – Dodge City

=== Bars, jazz clubs, and other notable indoor venues ===
- The Bottleneck – Lawrence
- Eighth Street Tap Room – Lawrence
- Gaslight Gardens – Lawrence
- The Jazzhaus – Lawrence
- Kirby's Beer Store – Wichita
- Odd Fellow Hall – Wichita
- Replay Lounge – Lawrence
- Walker's Jazz Lounge – Wichita

=== Outdoor venues and festivals ===
- Azura Amphitheater – Bonner Springs
- Country Stampede Music Festival – Bonner Springs
- The Dam Jam Music Festival – Winfield
- Kansas State Fair – Hutchinson
- Muddy River Music Festival – Atchison
- Riverfest Park – De Soto
- Somewhere Fest & Conference – Wichita
- Walnut Valley Festival – Winfield
- WAVE – Wichita
- Wichita Riverfest – Wichita
- Wild West Festival – Hays

== Bibliography ==
- Strong, Martin C. (2000). The Great Rock Discography (5th ed.). Edinburgh: Mojo Books. ISBN 1-84195-017-3.
- Blush, Steven (2001). American Hardcore: A Tribal History. Los Angeles: Feral House. ISBN 0-922915-71-7.
