= Outhouse (venue) =

Defunct music venue in Kansas, United States

The Outhouse
- Interactive map of The Outhouse
- Former names: Past the Pavement Hall
- Address: 1837 N 1500 Rd, Lawrence, Kansas 66046
- Location: U.S.
- Coordinates: 38°57′22.5″N 95°9′47.2″W
- Events: Music, concerts

The Outhouse was a hardcore punk music venue located east of Lawrence, Kansas, United States, on 15th Street. Original shows listed the venue as Past the Pavement Hall, being as the county pavement ended about 3/4 of a mile from the building.

== History ==
The parcel The Outhouse sits on used to house a one-room country school. Two large heritage trees still mark the entrance to the school site. The venue hosted many live music acts between the time it was leased for fraternity parties and biker bashes in 1985, until it was discovered by young rock bands desperate for a place to perform.

The first hardcore/alternative rock shows at The Outhouse happened in the late summer/fall of 1985. The growing mainstream popularity of pop punk music in the early 1990s led to the decline of the Outhouse, but what ultimately caused its closing was the Great Flood of 1993. Its doors were permanently closed in 1998. The building once known as the Outhouse is now a BYOB strip club with a small outhouse out near the road.

The Outhouse was unique because it was a gutted cinder-block storage garage in the middle of a corn field. The walls (if any) had been torn out leaving only cinder-block walls. Original shows in 1985 featured no stage until a stage was built by volunteers from the University of Kansas student radio station, KJHK, and various local bands. KJHK and others had made an arrangement with the Flaming Lips to play there and felt a stage was needed to attract other non-local acts. During the construction of the stage, it was suggested that the name be changed from Past the Pavement Hall. One KJHK staffer remarked that the place was a "shithole" and it should be called The Outhouse. The name stuck. Unfortunately, the Flaming Lips tour van broke down and that seminal show never occurred.

In the April 1986 issue of Spin, KJHK was recognized for "excellence in supporting a local music scene" for their work in bringing many national acts to The Outhouse and other Lawrence, Kansas music venues. It was a vibrant time for alternative live music in the Midwest.

The stage was a box that stood approximately a foot and a half above the cement floor. Much later, a bar area was added to the back that was used to sell T-shirts, and other band merchandise, as well as non-alcoholic refreshments. People often brought their own alcohol. At first alcohol was allowed in the club, but after The Outhouse received publicity in the local press, the Kansas ABC told the owner that it would begin enforcing the law at The Outhouse. Thereafter, alcohol was openly consumed in the parking-lot/front-yard, but not inside.

The building stood just outside the jurisdiction of the Lawrence police department. The Outhouse rarely had any sort of security, but negative incidents were rare. No one stood between the audience and the band.

Prior to the Outhouse, venues such as Veterans of Foreign Wars Halls in Kansas City and the Lawrence Opera House (later called Liberty Hall) would host hardcore concerts. When several of the local venues closed, the Outhouse quickly became the place to see punk shows. Concerts at the Outhouse were very inexpensive, with the first shows costing $3, and with $8 being the high end in the early 1990s.

Shows at the Outhouse weren't limited to the typical hardcore genre; there were ska, alternative, thrash metal, Oi! and other types of underground genres. People would come from as far as Topeka, Kansas, Kansas City and sometimes further, and with the University of Kansas nearby, there was no shortage of patrons.

== Notable performers ==
- 24-7 Spyz
- 7 Seconds
- Adolescents
- Adrenalin O.D.
- Agent Orange
- Agnostic Front
- Alice Donut
- ALL
- Anti-Flag
- ANTiSEEN
- Bad Brains
- Big Drill Car
- Bikini Kill
- The Beatnigs
- Body Count
- Bolt Thrower
- Blue Meanies
- The Business
- Cannibal Corpse
- Corrosion Of Conformity
- Circle Jerks
- Cro Mags
- D.I.
- Dag Nasty
- Descendents
- Die Kreuzen
- Doughboys
- Dropkick Murphys
- D.O.A.
- D.R.I.
- The Exploited
- Fear
- Fire Party
- Firehose
- Fishbone
- Flaming Lips
- Fugazi
- F.Y.P
- Gaye Bykers on Acid
- Gorguts
- Government Issue
- Get Smart!
- Green Day
- The Georgia Satellites
- Gwar
- Helmet
- Homestead Grays
- Jawbox
- The Jesus Lizard
- Killdozer
- Klusterfux
- L7
- Legal Weapon
- MDC
- Meat Puppets
- The Melvins
- The Micronotz
- The Mighty Mighty Bosstones
- Mind Over Four
- MU330
- Naked Raygun
- Nashville Pussy
- Nirvana
- No Means No
- Obituary
- The Offspring
- Pagan Babies
- Pantera
- Parasites
- Paw
- Prong
- The Queers
- Quicksand
- Rank and File
- Rapeman
- Redd Kross
- Rollins Band
- Rhythm Pigs
- Salem 66
- The Selecter
- Sick of It All
- Sin City Disciples
- Slackjaw
- Slapshot
- Sloppy Seconds
- Social Distortion
- Sonic Youth
- Soulside
- Swamp Thing
- Tenderloin
- Tool
- Toxic Reasons
- Troubled Youth
- Tupelo Chain Sex
- Ultraman
- U.K. Subs
- The Urge
- The Vandals
- Victims Family
- White Flag
- White Zombie

== Flyers ==
The Outhouse promoters had few options to advertise concerts. The University of Kansas's KJHK radio was instrumental in promoting Outhouse shows. In Kansas City, the local public radio station, 90.1 KKFI, had a two-hour hardcore/alternative show called The Little Orphan Annie Show (which went through several hosts and names), that would often announce concerts. The concerts were also sometimes announced in the local alternative newspaper The Pitch. The most common promotion technique was plastering flyers in Lawrence and in areas like the Westport neighborhood of the Kansas City Metropolitan area.
