= Swimming with Sharks (Get Smart! album) =

Swimming With Sharks

Studio album by Get Smart!
- Released: 1986
- Recorded: 1985
- Genre: Post-punk
- Length: 27:53
- Label: Restless / Enigma
- Producer: Iain Burgess

Get Smart! chronology
Action Reaction (1984)	Swimming With Sharks (1986)

Swimming With Sharks is the second album by Get Smart!, released on Enigma Records' "Restless" imprint in 1986.

== Info ==
Live versions of "Back Into The Future" and "World Without End", recorded at CBGB, had previously been released as a single.

"Gold To Rust" was released in Spain as a split single, coupled with "Home" by Gone Fishin' (from their Can't Get Lost When You're Goin' Nowhere album) by Enigma Europe.

The album was produced by Iain Burgess at Chicago Recording Company in Chicago in 1985.

All songs were written collectively by the band.

== Track listing ==
Side 1:

1. "To The Nines" - 3:04
2. "Sleeve" - 3:29
3. "Looking Out For #3" - 3:27
4. "Nothing I Can Do" - 2:59
5. "World Without End" - 2:58

Side 2:

1. "See Who's Laughing" - 1:59
2. "Gold To Rust" - 3:39
3. "Every Road That You Go Down" - 2:06
4. "Room w/a View" - 1:50
5. "Back Into The Future" - 2:30

== Personnel ==
- Marc Koch - vocals, guitar
- Lisa Wertman Crowe - vocals, bass
- Frank Loose - vocals, drums

== Reception ==
- "Swimming With Sharks finds Get Smart! progressing along nicely. The trio speedily works its multifarious way through ten songs in various idioms, offering sketchy poetic lyrics along the way. They're still rough around the edges — drummer Frank Loose gets stuck in patterns that limit songs' appeal — and neither bassist Lisa Wertman nor guitarist Marc Koch is that great a singer, but workable ideas and cool sounds bubble up regularly enough to make Swimming With Sharks a safe and rewarding experience." (Ira Robbins, Trouser Press, 1986)
- "Their new LP, Swimming With Sharks, is full of tense, carefully crafted miniatures that meld unvarnished noise with unexpected pretty vocal harmonies" (Renaldo Migaldi, Chicago Reader, 1986)
- "A definite improvement over this heady Chicago's trio's last wax. Get Smart! have yet to find the right bridge to the vicinity of the mainstream; still, this is a tasty aural treat for those who like to think and rock at the same time." (Jeff Silberman, Rock It, Fall 1986)
- "Swimming With Sharks finds Chicago's premier modern trio at their relentless best, serving up 10 tunes' worth of edgy, intense, and occasionally quite lovely hardcore folk" (Moira McCormick, Illinois Entertainer, September 1986)
- This album blends "aggressive dance-punk a la Gang of Four and Pylon with classique-moderne action reminiscent of X and The Embarrassment" (Joseph Neff, The Vinyl District, Oct 5, 2021)
