= DVS Mindz =

American hip hop group

- Origin: Topeka, Kansas, United States
- Genres: Rap, Hip-Hop
- Years active: 1993-2005; 2020-2021
- Labels: No Coast, EDP Records
- Past members: Str8jakkett (vocals); Killa The Hun (vocals); D.L. (vocals); D.O.P.E. (vocals); Def DJ (DJ); DJ Vee (DJ); Kutaculus (DJ)

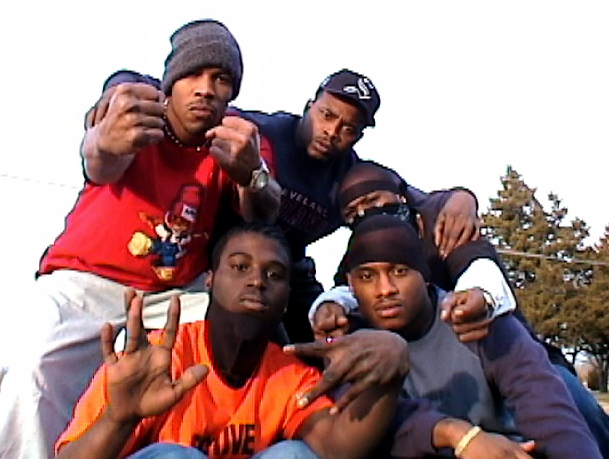
DVS Mindz

DVS Mindz is an American underground rap music group from Topeka, Kansas, United States, that was active primarily from the mid-1990s to the mid-2000s. DVS Mindz stands for Dope Versatile Styles Manifested IN a Direction to Zucceed and is pronounced "devious minds." The group's classic lineup consisted of four MCs: Str8jakkett, Killa The Hun, D.O.P.E., DL. In concert, DVS Mindz was backed by several different DJs, including Def DJ, DJ Vee, and Kutaculous. The band's sound was sparse, with raw beats and furious, nonstop rhyming from all members. DVS Mindz had catchy material, but many of its songs featured no chorus, just a sparse beat and verse after verse from the MCs. The band's lyrics were packed with inside jokes, mythology, pop-culture references, puns, numerology, religion, violence, and obscure references to the group's history. Each member also had alter egos and pseudonyms, and they sometimes rapped in those voices (For example, Str8Jakkett had another alter ego known as "Wrexx"). During its decade-long career, DVS Mindz released one critically acclaimed CD, and opened for a number of notable rap acts, including Run DMC, Wu Tang Clan, Sugarhill Gang, Redman, De La Soul, Digital Underground, Das EFX, Black Sheep, and Goodie Mob.

== Formation and early work ==
DVS Mindz formed in 1991 when rappers Str8jakkett and Killa The Hun, who met as children and attended school together, began collaborating on music. D.O.P.E signed two years later and the trio debuted Nov. 4, 1993, at a Topeka talent show.

The group's original sound owed major influence to hardcore East Coast rap groups such as the Wu Tang Clan, as well as old-school rap acts such as Erik B and Rakim. The trio began recording and performing in earnest, eventually landing two tracks on an Ill Crew Universal 1998 compilation entitled "I.C.U.: The Revival." The tracks were "No Coast" and "Real MCs," both of which showcased the group's lyrical prowess, dexterous verbal interplay, and growing confidence. Through numerous shows in the Topeka, Lawrence, and Kansas City areas, DVS Mindz was becoming a popular live attraction. DVS Mindz continued to work with Ill Crew Universal on other projects and shows.

The trio took refuge in a dilapidated house at 1137 Washburn in Topeka, Kansas. Unable to afford utilities, the group paid for just enough electricity to run their recording gear. During this time, the group bonded and wrote a number of its most popular songs. The number 1137 also became a popular lyrical theme for DVS, cropping up in songs such as "No Coast" and "Tired of Talking." The group eventually recruited two more members who solidified the group's classic lineup, DJ Kutaculus and a young MC named DL.

In December, 1999, DVS Mindz opened for U-God, an affiliate of the Wu-Tang Clan, at the Bottleneck in Lawrence, Kansas. The group caught the eye of journalist Geoff Harkness, who wrote a favorable review of its Bottleneck performance that was published in the Lawrence Journal-World. Harkness followed up with an extensive article about the group a few months later, which appeared on the cover of a local music weekly. Harkness recounted his first time seeing the group in his book, Chicago Hustle and Flow: Gangs, Gangsta Rap, and Social Class, writing, "I was blown away. They were one of the most amazing bands I had seen, in any genre. I assumed they were from New York and touring with U-God."

== Million Dolla Broke Niggaz ==
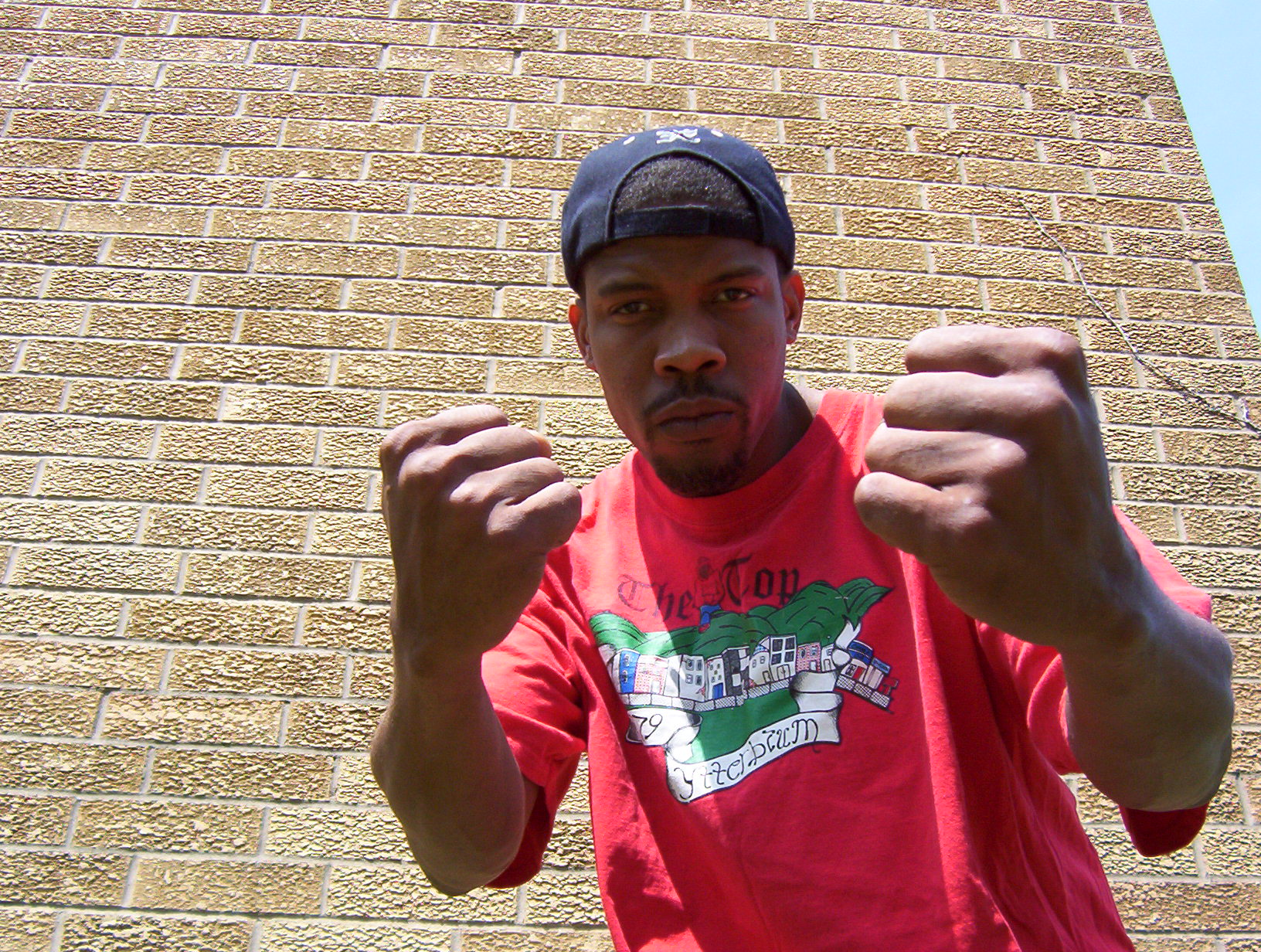
Str8jakkett

In May, 2000, the group released its debut album, Million Dolla Broke Niggaz, which contained tracks that dated back as far as 1994. The album spawned two popular songs, "Niggaz" and "Tired of Talking," both of which were nominated for song of the year by The Pitch. These and other songs showcased a much harder sound than the previous DVS Mindz recordings, surprising some of the group’s long-time fans. The group was also singled out by members of the local rap-music elite, who claimed that DVS Mindz was posturing and boring. Kansas City music writer JJ Hensley noted that “There are two schools of thought on the Mindz: those who think DVS Mindz is the area's tightest rap group and those who think their rhymes are unoriginal and their beats add nothing to the songs. There's some merit to both arguments."

Demencha Magazine weighed in with a review that compared the CD to "classic West Coast underground artists like Living Legends and Hieroglyphics come to mind as far as comparisons when you listen through these choice tracks featured off DVS’ Million Dolla Broke Niggaz album. They don’t pay much attention to choruses on this CD, in favor of just spitting flames back and forth for 15 tracks. More than half the album’s songs go for between 6–8 minutes in duration, and to hear these guys just trade verses (a’la Wu-Tang on 'Triumph') is amazing. Simply, Million Dolla Broke Niggaz is some old-school, local, underground shit in it’s [sic] rawest form." Str8jakkett explained the group's approach to recording this way: "It’s not that we didn’t know about counting bars, we just didn’t give a shit about counting bars. We wanted to spit. We come from a different era, as opposed to a lot of the younger guys coming into the game. They do a 16 and a chorus and a 16 and a chorus. We came up in the tundra. Spit. Give it your all. What was on that album, Million Dolla Broke Niggaz, was what I like to call 'off the corner rap.' Ain’t nobody trying to hear no chorus man, you know what I’m saying?"

== Shawn Edwards controversy ==
In July 2000, local writer Shawn Edwards singled out DVS Mindz in a scathing review of a Memorial Day "beach concert" held at the Kansas City International Raceway. Edwards wrote: “20 local rap groups that had paid for the opportunity to perform delivered second-rate sets ... None of the groups, including rap veterans DVS Mindz from Topeka, captured the crowd's attention. They paced the stage, spewing out unintelligible lyrics. The audience wasn't rude -- but it clearly was unimpressed. As they tried to capture the crowd's attention, most of the artists began calling the people in the audience ‘motherfuckers’ and yelling ‘Suck my dick!’ They started talking down to people in the audience, calling them ‘haters’ for not responding to their music, and they invited women to dance explicitly on stage. The crowd briefly got excited as young women flashed their breasts, but the strip-club antics grew tiresome as each group tried the same stunts.”

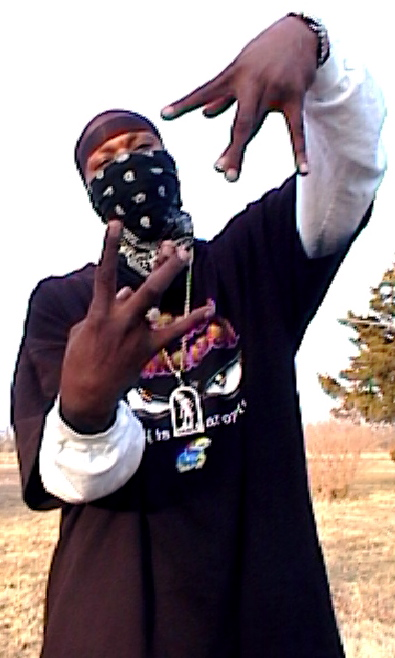
Killa The Hun

Music writer JJ Hensley wrote about the band in the Pitch, noting that, "After the group was the lone act mentioned by the Pitch‘s Shawn Edwards in a cover story about a local promoter’s ill-fated events, the members of DVS Mindz felt they had been singled out for ridicule in connection to a concert that had far deeper problems than subpar sets by its performers. "No Respect" then became the unofficial Y2K battle cry for DVS Mindz, which took time out at every show to preach from the pulpit about the evils of the local music bureaucracy. Over time, these diatribes snowballed into full-blown conspiracy theories."

The group addressed the Edwards article from the stage at Lawrence's Liberty Hall on August 7, 2000, when it opened for the Wu Tang Clan. Kansas City music writer Andrew Miller wrote that DVS Mindz, "delivered a fierce set teeming with intensity and emotion. Using stop-and-start beats and group recital in an impressive fashion, the crew spit fire on tracks such as "Tired of Talking," and its DJ showed and proved on the turntables after the set was done. Like Wu-Tang, DVS treated fans to some "real live a cappella hip-hop lyrics," with one rant that blasted the music industry for sleeping on the Midwest and several others that brutally lambasted Pitch writer Shawn Edwards, who the group felt gave it a bum rap in his piece 'One More Chance.' ... This was the group's big-time showcase, and it proved to a tightly packed crowd and two touring bands that it deserves major-label interest."

Edwards eventually apologized for the flap and introduced the group onstage at the Hurricane in spring 2001 as part of a Klammies showcase. Soon afterwards, Million Dolla Broke Niggaz, which was nominated for “best local release” by The Pitch, lost to Shiner’s "Starless," furthering the group’s paranoia that the local press was out to get them. DVS was also up for another award from the Pitch in 2001, for "best rap artist." According to writer Jason Meier, while attending The Pitch awards ceremony, "DVS Mindz provided one of the nights most classless moves. Within seconds of hearing that they lost to Tech 9Nine for another year, the group tossed their chairs high in the air, which made for a thunderous crashing sound as they stormed out of the theater." Pitch writer Andrew Miller, noted that Shawn "Edwards claimed the Best Hip Hop/R&B award was the 'hottest' of the night, and it certainly provoked the hottest tempers. After Tech N9ne was named the winner, crashing furniture and loud cries of dismay resounded from the floor as the other nominees bemoaned their fate." Perhaps unsurprisingly, the local press soured on DVS Mindz. The group's performances became increasingly erratic around this time, the once ferocious live act turning in the occasional uninspired set. The band continued to perform live, but internal squabbles and a virtual press blackout pushed DVS Mindz to the breaking point.

== Later years and solo work ==
DVS Mindz had more than two dozen tracks left over from the Million Dolla Broke Niggaz sessions. These songs included, "Headhunters," "Rowdy Hip-Hoppers," "Central Time Zone," "Let It All Hang Out," "Birds," and "Sleeping on the Midwest." The group also had new material, including tracks such as "Flamethrower," "Desperadoes," "Hatersville" and "Genocide," all of which were performed live at various concerts. Other new songs that were demoed included "Money is the Root of All Evil," "Smoking Song," "The Gospel of John," "Deeper Than Most," and "You Don't Want No Beef." A new song, "Heat," which had become a live staple, was issued on the 2001 compilation "Scars & Tattoos Midwest Compilation." DVS Mindz also completed a full-length documentary film entitled DVStory that is available on YouTube.

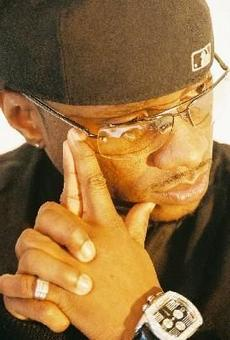
D.O.P.E.

In May, 2001, DL guested on a track entitled “Devious” by the Lawrence frat-funk group Phat Albert. A positive review in the Lawrence Journal-World described the song this way: "Featuring rip-snorting raps from DL (DVS Mindz), Deadly (The Zou) and the sublime vocal stylings of Aaron D (KB Posse), the song has quickly jumped into the public consciousness. It's spent the last several weeks at No. 1 on MP3.com's local hip-hop charts and has maneuvered its way onto area airwaves via"Classic Underground Sound" and "Breakfast For Beat Lovers," radio shows found on KJHK 90.7 FM.

In March, 2002, Kutaculous released a compilation disc entitled G-Coffee, that consisted of tracks recorded with various rappers in his Topeka studio. The members of DVS Mindz appeared on the disc, but there was no group track. A review in the Pitch noted, "Kutt’s strategy is simple and effective: let the beats and rhymes do the talking, and stay the hell out of the way. Kutt’s sparse backdrops strip the songs to their bone marrow, never hogging the spotlight from the MCs’ verbal viscosity."

D.O.P.E. eventually left the group and began a solo career under the name D Dot. with a slightly more commercial sound (his management company felt that the name D.O.P.E. was not marketable). D.O.P.E. issued a mixtape, Live @ the BarberShop, and a full-length solo album, Dangerous On Paper & Etc.: The D.O.P.E. LP, was released in July, 2005. The album featured 17 tracks, 14 produced by D.O.P.E. A followup, N.O.C.O.A.S.T., was released the next year. A single entitled "Someone 4 Me" was played on several radio stations across the country. D.O.P.E. also continued to work as a producer, including work on a large portion of Str8jakkett's Mood Swings album. He was offered a major-label deal with Arista Records that fell through when the label folded. He is currently working on a new album, "Beats Rhymes & Life".

DVS Mindz never officially broke up, but it remained largely inactive during the 2000s and 2010s. The group members continued to make music separately, although they remained friendly and worked together or reunited on stage from time to time.

In 2007, Str8jakkett released his solo debut, the 20-track Mood Swings. "Everyone in DVS Mindz is featured in this album, but "[it's] about me," Str8jakkett told a reporter. "I wanted people to know where this came from, where it's been, and where I'm at now. ... I'm introducing myself to the world." The disc received a lukewarm review from The Pitch writer Andrew Miller: “His beats sound like they've been sitting on the shelf for at least a decade ... at 78 minutes, Mood Swings runs a few tracks too long and includes the standard rap-album filler: voice-mail messages, a bank-robbery skit and a fake live radio spot from ‘DJ Dick Goesinya at Club Nutsack.’" Journalist Chris Mills countered with a glowing review in Demencha Magazine, stating, "Str8jakkett is a pure lyricist with a seasoned delivery and a flashy vocabulary ... Most of the beats on Mood Swings have a refreshing, bassy, West Coat influence, while Str8's manner of rapping is sodden with enough straight talk to please any indie head." Mood Swings included a re-recording of the unreleased DVS Mindz track "Flamethrower," with Str8jakkett replacing the second and third verses recorded by DL and Killa The Hun, respectively. Another old DVS Mindz song, "Birds," was given a complete makeover, as was a retooled version of "DVS Mindbender," which appeared in its original form on Million Dolla Broke Niggaz.

Str8kjakkett issued a second solo effort in 2008 titled, G.A.M.E. Grown-Ass Man Experience. The effort included "The DVS Story" where Str8jakkett recounted the band's rise and fall in candid terms. Demencha Magazine wrote that, "Str8jakkett's a master of lyrical sleight-of-hand and word-play, effortlessly blending language and music to his will, while conjuring up a masterful blend of modern pop-culture metaphors and concrete poetry."

== Reunion ==
In 2020, DVS Mindz briefly reunited as a trio featuring Str8jakkett, Killa the Hun, and DL. The group issued a mixtape, DVS Mindz Zip Codes, produced by Def DJ, who worked with DVS Mindz in its early years. Weeks later, the group released Modern Warfare 2020, its first full-length album in twenty years. Modern Warfare was issued by EDP Records, an independent label that has released most of Str8jakkett's solo albums. A music video for the single "Bryght Burn" was shot at Red Rocks Amphitheatre outside of Denver, Colorado. Reviewing the video for the Pitch, journalist Nick Spacek wrote, "Considering the track kicks off with references to horror movies and comic books—Candyman and X-Men, respectively— ”Bryght Burn” also slaps as hard as anything coming out of the area."

In 2020, the same trio also issued The Genesis, a 15-track compilation of unreleased tracks that were recorded during the band's heyday. In 2021, the trio issued a second mixtape, O.N.L.Y. F.A.N.S. before splitting again.

== Growing critical recognition ==
In recent years, DVS Mindz has received growing critical acclaim as a seminal rap group in the Kansas City-Lawrence-Topeka music scene. In 2008, Topeka journalist Zach Trimble wrote that "DVS Mindz virtually created the Kansas rap landscape." In 2014, blogger Mike Jones wrote, "If you aren’t from around Kansas and didn’t know much about the hip hop scene in the late 90’s, you might not have heard of the legendary DVS Mindz crew but those of you who were, you know that these cats represented hard for Topeka. Along with a few other artists, DVS was Topeka hip hop."

== The Twenty-Year Saga of the Greatest Rap Group to Almost Make it Outta Kansas ==
In 2023, Columbia University Press announced the publication of a book, DVS Mindz: The Twenty-Year Saga of the Greatest Rap Group to Almost Make it Outta Kansas, written by Geoff Harkness. A description of the monograph read: Geoff Harkness takes readers on a unique two-decade journey alongside the members of DVS Mindz, chronicling their childhoods, their brush with success, and what became of them in the years that followed. Based on more than one hundred hours of video and audio recordings from 1999 to 2022, this fly-on-the-wall account offers a backstage pass into the recording studios and radio stations, video shoots and house parties, nightclubs and concert halls of the Kansas City-Lawrence-Topeka music scene circa 2000. DVS Mindz is at once a compulsively readable group biography of four talented MCs, a vibrant voyage through the forgotten history of local hip hop, and a breathtakingly real story of struggling to achieve big dreams.

In reviewing the book, Justin Burton wrote, "In DVS Mindz, Harkness tells the birth, life, and afterlife of a musical group in a way that is uncommon in hip hop studies, touching on some of the same narrative arcs that animate the biographies of successful musicians, but from the perspective of a group who was poised for a kind of success that never came. It's a remarkable project."
