= Numbers and Colours =

Single by Get Smart!
- A-side: "Numbers and Colours"
- B-side: "Ankle Deep in Mud"
- Released: May 13, 1981
- Recorded: April 1981
- Studio: Ramona Recording, Lawrence, KS
- Genre: Post-punk
- Length: 2:37, 4:02
- Label: Fresh Sounds
- Songwriter: Get Smart!
- Producer: Dave Stuckey

Get Smart! singles chronology
| "Numbers and Colours" (1981) | "'Words Move'" (1981) |

"Numbers and Colours / Ankle Deep in Mud" is the debut release by the post-punk band Get Smart!. It was released as a 6-inch flexi disc that accompanied the May 13, 1981 issue of Talk Talk magazine.

== General info ==
The song "Ankle Deep in Mud" was written by the Battling Tops, who were guitarist Marc Koch's previous band. The band would include this song in their set list throughout their career, even as other early songs were dropped. This is an earlier recording than the one that would appear on their 1984 album Action Reaction.

The song "Numbers and Colours" does not appear on any other Get Smart! records.

Both tracks were recorded in April 1981 at Ramona Recording Studios in Lawrence, KS and were produced by Dave Stuckey (later of the "Dave and Deke Combo").

== Track listing ==
1. "Numbers and Colours" - 2:37
2. "Ankle Deep in Mud" - 4:02

== Personnel ==
Musicians:

- Marc Koch - vocals, guitar
- Lisa Wertman Crowe - vocals, bass
- Frank Loose - drums

Technical staff:

- Dave Stuckey - producer
- Karl Hoffmann - engineer
- Dan Swinney - assistant engineer

== Reception ==
- "Oversimplistic punky approach which is a good example of clean US-Street-Punk. Goes down well from my point of view." (G.Beez, Gorilla Beat, 1981)
- "Numbers and Colours and Ankle Deep in Mud are very good examples of what Get Smart! have to offer: original, simple, clean material and an energized, tight performance." (Karen Barber, KLZR 106 Music Guide, 1981)
- In 2020, The Pitch described "Ankle Deep in Mud" as "a protest strong which is just as relevant today as it was nearly four decades ago, like a furious update of Pete Seeger's 'Waist Deep in the Big Muddy.'"
