= Action Reaction =

Studio album by Get Smart!
- Released: 1984
- Recorded: Oct/Nov 1982, Remixed: July 1983
- Genre: Post-punk
- Length: 34:20
- Label: Fever / Enigma
- Producers: Taylor Ross, Iain Burgess

Get Smart! chronology
Words Move (1981)	Action Reaction (1984)	Swimming with Sharks (1986)

Action Reaction is the debut album by American post-punk band Get Smart!, released on Enigma Records' "Fever" imprint in 1984.

== Info ==
Initially, Nebraska's "Capitol Punishment" announced that the album would be released on the "Fresh Sounds" label, which had previously issued the band's debut single and "Fresh Sounds" cassette. However, the band later signed with Philadelphia based "Fever Records" (not to be confused with the New York-based label of the same name), which ultimately released the album.

The album was originally recorded by Michael McGee and produced by Taylor Ross at Media Sound in Oklahoma City. Ross then recruited Iain Burgess to remix the album for release at Chicago Recording Company in Chicago.

An earlier version of "Ankle Deep In Mud" had appeared on their debut single, "Numbers and Colours", and an earlier version of "Black Mirror" has appeared on the "Sub Pop #7" compilation cassette.

All songs were written by the band, except for "Ankle Deep In Mud" which was written by Vance Lyons, and "Black Mirror" where the lyrics were written by Vance Lyons and the music was written by Get Smart!. (Vance Lyons had played with Marc Koch in a previous band called the Battling Tops.)

Side 1 and Side 2 were originally supposed to be reversed, as the album was supposed to start with "On And On" and then end with "You've Got To Stop" (i.e. it would start with "On" and end with "Stop"), but for some unknown reason this was reversed in the final product.

== Track listing ==
Side 1:

1. "Because Of Green" – 3:03
2. "What It Is We Fear" – 3:18
3. "Knight" – 2:18
4. "Ankle Deep In Mud" – 4:55
5. "You've Got To Stop" – 3:38

Side 2:

1. "On And On" – 2:02
2. "Just For The Moment" – 2:23
3. "The Difference" – 3:02
4. "Face" – 2:36
5. "Black Mirror" – 2:18
6. "Berlin On The Plains" – 2:47
7. "They Walk In Pairs " – 1:58

== Personnel ==
- Marc Koch – vocals, guitar
- Lisa Wertman Crowe – vocals, bass
- Frank Loose – vocals, drums

== Reception ==
- "This is what happened to Midwestern bar bands when they heard the Sex Pistols. Lots of beat and jangle; it's raw and rocking" (Barbara Nellis, Playboy, March 1985)
- "Warm pop melodicism competes with punky bluntness and jagged noise tendencies on Action Reaction, creating a variety of stylistic voices within the plainly constructed guitar-bass-drums framework; harmony vocals add to the appeal." (Ira Robbins, Trouser Press, 1986)
