= The Germ (album) =

Studio album by Victim's Family
- Released: 1992
- Genres: Hardcore punk, jazz, punk rock, pronk, heavy metal
- Length: 38:01
- Labels: Alternative Tentacles; Konkurrent
- Producer: John Wright

Victim's Family chronology
White Bread Blues (1990)	The Germ (1992)	Headache Remedy (1994)

Professional ratings
Review scores
Source	Rating
AllMusic	3.5/5 stars

The Germ is an album by the California punk band Victim's Family. It was their first to be released on the Alternative Tentacles label, after departing Mordam Records.

The album's cover illustration, titled "Yellow Head," was created by Harvey Stafford.

== Critical reception ==
AllMusic praised the album's break from traditional hardcore, writing that some songs "are closer to the tripped-out indie psychedelia of Screaming Trees or Meat Puppets."

== Track listing ==
1. "The Germ" (3:07)
2. "I Pissed on a Tree" (3:08 )
3. "3 Piece Loincloth" (2:07)
4. "Instant Gratification" (0:44)
5. "Mind You" (1:30)
6. "I'm Such a Jerk" (2:41)
7. "New World Hors D'Oeuvre" (2:03)
8. "Baklava" (2:57)
9. "Bad Karma" (2:24)
10. "Insidious" (3:15)
11. "Vinnie + 1" (2:25)
12. "Er What?" (1:35)
13. "Fuck Richard Up" (1:11)
14. "Who Needs It?" (2:40)
15. "My Evil Twin" (3:38 )
16. "Lack of Interest" (1:36)
17. "Bogus Track" (1:00)
