= Fresh Sounds from Middle America (vol 3) =

Compilation album by Various Artists
- Released: 1986
- Recorded: 1986
- Genre: Punk rock, alternative rock
- Label: Fresh Sounds (FS 213)
- Producer: Bill Rich

Various Artists chronology
Fresh Sounds From Middle America (vol 2) (1981)	Fresh Sounds from Middle America (vol 3) (1986)	Live from Lawrence (1988)

Fresh Sounds From Middle America (vol 3) was the third album released in the series of compilations featuring bands from the Midwest region of America. The mix of styles was about half punk rock and half alternative rock. The best known of the bands included are the Micronotz, the Pedal Jets and the Homestead Grays. This volume was presented by "Redline and KJHK".

== General info ==
The "Fresh Sounds" series was organized by Bill Rich, of Talk Talk magazine, as a way to promote regional bands nationally.

The previous two albums in the series were cassette only releases, released in 1981. This album was the first to be released as a vinyl LP and it was a more conventional compilation, with one track per band, whereas the previous two albums had multiple tracks from each band. Bill Rich chose to release this volume of the series on vinyl because he felt that unknown bands were given more legitimacy when their music was released on vinyl.

This was the only vinyl appearance for bands such as Von Bulows, Hundreds & Thousands, Brompton's Cocktail, and Near Death Experience.

== Track listing ==
1. Psychic Archie - Didn't Love Her
2. Von Bulows - Summer Song
3. Homestead Grays - Rev. Cross
4. Boxes of Love - OK
5. The Yardapes - Superstitious
6. Lions & Dogs - Be My Something
7. Thumbs - Jericho
8. Hundreds & Thousands - The Girl in Little Rock
9. The Iguanas - Market
10. Brompton's Cocktail - Hypocritical Success
11. Bum Kon - Steam Engine #9
12. Near Death Experience - Dolphin Torture
13. The Micronotz - Gimme Some Skin
14. Short Notice - Beg for Mercy
15. Pedal Jets - Hide & Go Seek
16. Rabbit Scat - Gimme Some of that Go-Go Juice

== Reception ==
- "A fascinating tour of a wide-open rock & roll prairie, and value for money to boot - sixteen just out-of-the-garage bandsand close to an hour of music. There's more to Lawrence, Kansas than William Burroughs." (David Fricke, Rolling Stone, 1987)
- "There are 15 bands that really show world that the Lawrence's "scene" is as good or better than any around. Among them are the Homestead Grays, Micronotz, Lions and Dogs, Thumbs and the PedalJets." (Doug Hitchcock, Lawrence Journal-World, 1986)
- "This sampler resents diverse sounds from some familiar (MICRONOTZ, BUM KON, IGUANAS) and mostly relatively unknown bands. While side one is composed of adequate alternative pop tracks, the flip really lets loose with hard-edged punky tunes spanning most of the punk/HC spectrum. Interesting comp--and worth your attention." (Steve Spinali, Maximumrocknroll, 1986)
- "Sound quality varies from track to track, but performance quality is top notch. The album is roughly divided into a new wave side and a punk side. The Punks: I dug the Micronotz' fiery take on 'Gimme Some Skin' and Pedal Jets' 'Hide and Go Seek' " (Option Magazine, 1986)
- "These sounds may not be that fresh but at least there isn't anything truly rotten on this compilation either. Most of these bands, as usual, look to folk-rock and psychedelia for inspiration, but often with original results. There are too many groups and songs here to go into individually, and many of them blur into each other, sound-wise, but all in all this is a decent collection. Strangely, an early Talking Heads-type rhythm is utilized by most of these combo. No complaints, though." (Jordan Oakes, Jet Lag magazine, 1986)
