= Live from Lawrence =

Live From Lawrence

Compilation album by Various Artists
- Released: 1988
- Recorded: 1988
- Genre: various
- Label: Fresh Sounds (FS 218)
- Producer: Bill Rich

Various Artists chronology
Fresh Sounds Vol 3 (1986)	Live From Lawrence (1988)	Fresh Sounds Vol 5 (1990)

Live from Lawrence was the fourth album in the "Fresh Sounds From Middle America" series of compilation albums, and like the previous album in the series it was a collaborative effort by Fresh Sounds Records and the KJHK radio station.

== General info ==
KJHK held a competition called "Quest for Vinyl" for bands that wanted to appear on the compilation. The "Fresh Sounds" series was originally devised by Bill Rich, of Talk Talk magazine, as a way to promote regional bands nationally. However, in an interview with the Lawrence Journal-World, execs from several independent record companies cast doubt that such an appearance would be a springboard to greater success for the bands.

The organisers of this volume in the series were Bill Rich (Fresh Sounds), Brad Schwartz (KJHK station manager), Sam Elliott (KJHJ faculty advisor) and Michael Bassin (KJHK entertainment coordinator).

== Track listing ==
Side 1:

#	Song title	Artist
1	Gestompo	Sin City Disciples
2	It Don'T Matter	Ultraviolets
3	36-22-36	Rhythm Kings
4	Gravity	Random Aztech
5	King Tubby (Que Serà)	Common Ground
6	Freedom Fighters	Lonesome Houndogs
7	Eleutheromania	Mudhead

Side 2:

#	Song title	Artist
1	Chains Of This Town	Homestead Grays
2	Help	No Difference
3	Off The Top Of My Head	Todd Newman Band
4	Empty Rooms	Parlor Frogs
5	5 O'Clock Shadows	Bangtails
6	A Floating Man	Drowning Incident
7	Mr. Green Jeans	Moving Van Goghs
