= Fresh Sounds Records =

American rock record label (founded 1981)

- Founded: 1981
- Founder: Bill Rich
- Status: Inactive
- Genre: Alternative rock
- Country of origin: United States
- Location: Lawrence, Kansas

Fresh Sounds Records (also known as Fresh Sounds Inc) was an independent record label from Lawrence, Kansas, run by local music promoter Bill Rich. Acts that have been on the label include Get Smart!, the Embarrassment, the Mortal Micronotz, Start, SPK, the Homestead Grays and William S. Burroughs.

== History ==
The label was founded in 1981 and its first releases were flexi discs that were issued with Rich's Talk Talk magazine. The first four albums issued by the label were issued on cassette only before the label started issuing its releases on vinyl.

== Fresh Sounds from Middle America ==
The Fresh Sounds from Middle America series of compilation albums was organized by Bill Rich as a way to promote regional bands on a national level.

== Discography ==
Year	Cat no	Artist	Title	Format
1981	Fresh Flexi 001	Abuse	"No Money" / "In America" / "Love's Alright"	flexi (3 tracks)
1981	Fresh Flexi 002	Get Smart!	"Numbers and Colours" / "Ankle Deep in Mud"	flexi (2 tracks)
1981	Fresh Flexi 003	William S. Burroughs	"Abandoned Artifacts" / "On the Nova Lark"	flexi
1981	Fresh Tape 101	Various artists	Fresh Sounds from Middle America (vol 1)	cassette
1981	Fresh Tape 102	Various artists	Fresh Sounds from Middle America (vol 2)	cassette
1982	Fresh Tape 103	SPK	Last Attempt at Paradise Tape	cassette
1984	Fresh Tape 104	The Embarrassment	Retrospective	cassette
1982	FS 201	Mortal Micronotz	Mortal Micronotz	LP (14 tracks)
1982	FS 202	Broadcast	Zero Hour	7-inch EP (4 tracks)
1983	FS 203	Start	Look Around	12-inch EP
1983	FS 204	The Embarrassment	Death Travels West	LP
1983	FS 206	The Micronotz	Smash	12-inch EP
1984	FS 207 (Note: These releases did not have a Fresh Sounds catalog number shown on the release itself, but the number was shown in the printed Fresh Sounds catalog.)	The YardApes	"Neurosis"/"Ghost Town"	7-inch single
1984	FS 208	The O.D.'s	Back at the Ranch	LP
1984	FS 209	Short Term Memory	Effect of Excess	LP
1984	FS 210	Mortal Micronotz	Live Recording of the Video Soundtrack	7-inch EP
1985	FS 211	The Micronotz	The Beast That Devoured Itself	LP
1985	FS 212	The YardApes	"Weatherman"/"White as a Ghost"	7-inch single
1986	FS 213	Various artists	Fresh Sounds from Middle America (vol 3)	LP
1983	FS 214	The Micronotz	40 Fingers	LP (13 tracks)
1983	FS 215	William S. Burroughs	Break Through in Grey Room	LP
1987	FS 216	Intensive Care	They Thought They Were Free	LP
1987	FS 217	The Embarrassment	The Embarrassment LP	LP
1988	FS 218	Various artists	Live from Lawrence	LP
1988	FS 219	Homestead Grays	Big Hits	12-inch vinyl
1989	FS 220	Intensive Care	Assault Down Memory Lane LP	LP
1990	FS 221	Various artists	Fresh Sounds from Middle America (vol 5)	CD
