= Fresh Sounds from Middle America (vol 5) =

Fresh Sounds From Middle America (vol 5)

Compilation album by Various Artists
- Released: 1990
- Recorded: 1990
- Genre: Post-punk
- Label: Fresh Sounds (FS 221)
- Producer: Bill Rich

Various Artists chronology
Live from Lawrence (1988)	Fresh Sounds From Middle America (vol 5) (1990)

Fresh Sounds From Middle America (vol 5) is the fifth and last album in the Lawrence, Kansas-based series of compilation albums. This volume was the first to be released on compact disc.

The "Fresh Sounds" series was organized by Bill Rich, of Talk Talk magazine, as a way to promote regional bands nationally.

== Track listing ==
1. Across the Line - Homestead Grays (3:23)
2. I Was Only Joking - The Catherines (4:04)
3. Do As I Say - The Mahoots (3:31)
4. The Grand Design - The Backsliders (2:18)
5. You Wrecked the Party - The Wilmas (2:40)
6. In Our World - Ultraviolets (3:10)
7. Deviatus - Schloss Tegal (3:19)
8. Death Fiend Guerillas - W.M. Burroughs (11:00)
9. Red - Kill Whitey (3:55)
10. Away - Killing Drum (3:00)
11. Bright Lights - Joe Worker (3:20)
12. Eyes of Concern - Second Chance (4:00)
13. Escapee - Klusterfux (3:00)
14. Evening Whirl - Hayseeds (2:30)
15. My Best Friends - Kill Creek (4:36)
16. I Belong To You - 2-Mile Death Plunge (3:10)
17. Gray - Ultraman (2:28)
18. Drinking Hot Water - Car Family (2:25)
