= Restless Variations =

Compilation album by Various Artists
- Released: 1986
- Genre: Post-punk
- Label: Restless \ Enigma
- Producer: Eddy Schreyer

Restless Variations is a compilation album of newer artists (in 1986) that were on Restless Records issued as a single LP in a gatefold sleeve. The album included tracks from several notable acts, including Mojo Nixon & Skid Roper, The Dead Milkmen, Fear and Get Smart! and was compiled by Steev Riccardo, Scott Vanderbilt and Rick Orienza.

A "record release" concert, featuring Mojo Nixon, the Dead Milkmen, John Trubee and 28th Day, was held at Raji's in Hollywood on February 12, 1986.

== Track listing ==
Side one

1. The Neighborhoods – "Arrogance" (2:48)
2. Get Smart! – "Back Into the Future" (2:29)
3. The Outlets – "Tilted Track" (3:59)
4. The Dead Milkmen – "Bitchin' Camaro" (3:58)
5. Electric Peace – "Work So Hard" (3:43)
6. Straw Dogs – "Young Fast Iranians" (4:21)

Side two

1. Mojo Nixon & Skid Roper – "Ain't Got Nobody" (2:08)
2. Lazy Cowgirls – "Rock Of Gibraltar" (3:08)
3. 28th Day – "Dead Sinner" (3:56)
4. The Villanelles – "Each New Day" (2:19)
5. John Trubee & The Ugly Janitors Of America – "Ex Lax For Cheryl Tiegs" (3:55)
6. Fear – "More Beer" (3:40)

== Reception ==
- "Among the acts signed to Restless are Fear, Mojo Nixon and Skid Roper, Dead Milkmen, John Trubee and others. For a taste of what Restless is all about the label has released a compilation of its artists called 'Restless Variations'" (Los Angeles Daily News, 1986)
- "Enigma Records, which is negotiating with a major record company for a new distribution deal, has started a new label Restless Records. The new label will be the home for such artists as Mojo Nixon, the Dead Milkmen, John Trubee and the 28th Day who'll all be on hand Wednesday at Raji's in Hollywood for a coming out concert celebrating a new compilation album 'The Restless Variations' which is also due out this week." (Patrick Goldstein, Los Angeles Times. 1986)
- "The styles on Restless Variations range from the hardcore crunch of Fear's 'More Beer' to the more ethereal and psychedelic musings of 28th Day's 'Dead Sinner'. " (Los Angeles Daily News, 1986)
