= Can't Get Lost When You're Goin' Nowhere =

Studio album by Gone Fishin'
- Released: 1986
- Recorded: 1986
- Genres: Southern rock, rock
- Label: Restless
- Producers: Randu Everett, Matt Piucci & Tim Lee for ELP productions

Can't Get Lost When You're Goin' Nowhere is an album by Gone Fishin', a band featuring Matt Piucci from Rain Parade and Tim Lee from The Windbreakers.

The song "Home" was released as a split single with "Gold To Rust" by Get Smart! by Enigma Records in Spain.

== Track listing ==
A side

1. "No Rapture" - 4:12
2. "All You Want" - 3:16
3. "Home" - 4:00
4. "Charlie Jones" - 4:47
5. "Take a Left" - 2:01

B side

1. "Touch the Gold" - 3:21
2. "Lift It Up" - 3:59
3. "Too Many Eyes" - 3:10
4. "Something Happened" - 4:08
5. "Something Better" - 5:42

== Personnel ==
- Tim Lee – vocals, guitars, bass, keyboards, percussion
- Matt Piucci – vocals, guitars, keyboards, percussion, bass
- Bruce Golden – drums
- Randy Everett
- George Cartwright
- Bobby Sutliff – backing vocals
- Kris Wilkinson – backing vocals
- Robin Sutliff
- Andy Piucci

== Reception ==
- "The Piucci/Lee colloboration [sic] is everything expected of them and more. All embellishments have been restricted to a bare minimum and the emphasis is on the song, the guitar and the voice, all three remarkable in their power and sublety. The individual styles of Matt and Tim are evenly and distinctly divided but the overall standard is such that no criticism, that they have not blended their sound more noticeably, can be afforded." (Chris Horn, Bucket Full Of Brains)
- "The Gone Fishin' album, Can't Get Lost When You're Goin' Nowhere, was recorded in Mississippi in February 1986. While the arrangements mix things up effectively, the pair co-wrote only two tracks — the rest are individual efforts. The creative collaboration is unproductive: meandering acoustic doodles with electric guitar overdubs, poorly sung rock tunes and dusty pop songs that suffer from the incompatibility of their voices. The nerdy organ on the joint "Lift It Up" suggests a possibly functional period approach that is otherwise ignored on the LP." (Scott Schinder/Ira Robbins, Trouser Press)
- "This album is a collaborative effort by Rain Parade's Matt Piucci and Tim Lee of the Windbreakers, and it's a decidedly mixed endeavor. While the sound quality is good and some of the songs are decent, the album also has its share of less effective tunes, pedestrian solo break sections, and at times joltingly sloppy ensemble playing. Highlights include "Touch the Gold," with its rasping bluesy singing and spare arrangement featuring twangy slide guitar and clipped organ; "Lift It Up," with its almost shouted vocal, fuzz rock guitar, and chorus-only vintage-garage-band-sounding keyboards and drums; and two acoustic singer-songwriter style numbers, "Take a Left" and "Too Many Eyes," the latter exhibiting an especially yearning, if squarish, melodiousness. R.E.M.'s musical influence on this album is never too far from the surface and is especially noticeable on the ringing guitar track "Charlie Jones." This is a respectable, if not essential, recording." (David Cleary, Allmusic)
