= Million Dolla Broke Niggaz =

Million Dolla Broke Niggaz: The DVS Mindz Exxxperience 1994–2000

Studio album by DVS Mindz
- Released: May 2000
- Recorded: 1994–2000
- Genres: Rap, hip hop
- Length: 73:37
- Label: No Coast Records
- Producer: S.G.

Million Dolla Broke Niggaz: The DVS Mindz Exxxperience 1994–2000 was the first official full-length release from the Topeka, Kansas rap group DVS Mindz. “"We got million dollar dreams, but we ain't got no money,” Kutaculus, the group’s DJ, explained of the title. The CD has been long out of print, and physical copies are hard to find online, but the entire album is available for streaming.

== 1994–2000 ==
Million Dolla Broke Niggaz was an anthology that contained tracks recorded during DVS Mindz' first six years. The CD contained some of the group's most popular songs as well as tracks that were rarely, if ever, performed live. The disc contained 15 tracks and was released on May 9, 2000. A limited-edition of 100 discs featuring different cover artwork, a slightly different track listing, and autographs by each member of DVS Mindz, was issued just prior to the official release.

Million Dolla Broke Niggaz compiled tracks from different eras of the group’s career, and the disc features seven producers (S.G., Tom Woosley, D.O.P.E., Dr. Who, Mr. Wolf, Boogieman and Rock). Several tracks are either solo ventures or feature special guests. Three tracks are listed as “Public Service Announcements,” featuring short raps from D.L., Killa The Hun, and Srtr8jakket. D.O.P.E. was unable to complete the recording of his public service announcement in time, and was therefore not included on the disc.

== A changing sound ==
Four of the group’s most frequently performed live tracks were featured on the disc: “Madness,” “Tired of Talking,” (both produced by D.O.P.E.), "Bust Something," and "Niggaz (1137)" (both helmed by the production duo Boogieman and Rock). Two versions of “Tired of Talking” were recorded, the latter version of which was the more popular, at least with the group. DVS Mindz rarely performed the original version live, and the newer take was used as the soundtrack for the band's first music video. Puzzlingly, Million Dolla Broke Niggaz includes the original version of "Tired of Talking" rather than the newer one. It was rumored that the change was made due to failed negotiations to secure the production rights to the newer version of the song. “Bust Something,” a popular live cut, featured Kansas City rappers the Zou. The two newest tracks on the disc, “Bust Something” and “Niggaz (1137)” represented the group’s growing inclination towards hardcore, gangsta rap, a move embraced by newer fans, but one questioned by some longtime fans. “Our sound has changed,” Killa The Hun explained. “We've matured lyrically a lot. DVS Mindz has gone through some rebuilding, but now that we've got everything in order, we're like the stunt men of rap.... We come in and take the bumps and bruises and go on about the business."

== Solo tracks and collaborations ==
In addition to the public service announcements, the group members contributed to the release in various ways. “Murdarous Verses” is a solo track featuring Killa the Hun, with D.L. contributing backup vocals. “Me Against Myself and I Prevail” features three of Str8jakkett’s personalities, all rapping in a schizophrenic bouillabaisse. D.O.P.E. produced two notable cuts, “Madness” and the original version of “Tired of Talking.”

The album also featured rarely performed numbers such as "DVS Mindbender," “Unsigned Hype” and “Misrepresenters” three of the oldest tracks on the release.“Seven” is a seven-minute track with a chorus that doesn't show up until the last 30 seconds. The track features seven MCs, with DVS Mindz collaborating with a young trio called Qui-Lo, consisting of Jus an M.C. (who would later become Joe Good, an associate of Mac Lethal), Masta Chi (who would later become Titanium Frame), and Sket (who would later become Godemis and help found the Kansas City rap act Ces Cru). “These cats were like 17, 18 years old and they were on stage rocking 600 or 700 people at the Grenada,” Str8jakkett recalled in an interview. Qui-Lo was signed to DVS Mindz' independent label, No Coast Records, and recorded its debut album, which went unreleased after the trio disbanded.

== Critical response ==
The disc received nearly universal praise from the local music press. The Pitch called it "sonic timeline of the Topeka rap outfit’s storied history." Music journalist JJ Hensley commended the "stellar DVS debut, which featured 'Tired of Talking' and 'Niggaz (1137),' two of the best hip-hop singles ever to come out of this area." Journalist Geoff Harkness opined in a June 1, 2000 review for the Lawrence Journal-World that "the DVS debut serves as a bell-ringing wake-up call to area rap groups: The game just got raised to a whole new level." Journalist Andrew Miller dubbed the album "essential." The Pitch named "Million Dolla Broke Niggaz" one of its best albums of 2000: "Eschewing Kansas City’s hardcore sound might have been easy for DVS Mindz to do, given that the crew hails from Topeka, but its collection of raw, tough-talking, and introspective songs on Million Dollar Broke Niggaz showed KC listeners that rap could be about more than simply getting fucked up." In 2014, blogger Mike Jones wrote that "Million Dolla Broke Niggaz" is "still a Top City classic."

== Track listing ==
1. "Public Service Announcement: D.L." – 0:40
2. "Madness" – 4:45
3. "DVS Mindbender” – 5.19
4. "Seven" (feat. Qui Lo) – 7:10
5. "Public Service Announcement: Killa The Hun” – 1:03
6. "Murdarous Verses” – 4:22
7. "Misrepresenters” – 6:13
8. "Tired of Talking" – 6:24
9. "Inferred Connection” (Feat. Bronz and Paw Paww) – 7:33
10. "Public Service Announcement: Str8jakkett” – 1:46
11. "Me Against Myself and I Prevail" – 5:38
12. "Unsigned Hype" – 5:09
13. "Bust Something (radio edit)" – 5:29
14. "Niggaz (1137)" – 6:00
15. "Yellow Brick Road" (Feat Pontiak) – 6:13

== Personnel ==
- Str8jakkett - vocals
- Killa The Hun - vocals
- D.O.P.E. - vocals
- D.L. - vocals
- Kutaculous - DJ
- Godemis (Qui Lo)- vocals
- Titanium Frame (Qui Lo)- vocals
- Joe Good (Qui Lo)- vocals
- Bronz - vocals
- Paww Paww - vocals
- Pontiak - vocals
