= Fresh Sounds from Middle America (vol 1) =

Compilation album by Various Artists
- Released: December 12, 1981
- Recorded: 1981
- Genre: Post-punk
- Label: Fresh Sounds
- Producer: Fresh Tape 101

Various Artists chronology
| Fresh Sounds from Middle America (vol 1) (1981) | Fresh Sounds from Middle America (vol 2) (1981) |

Fresh Sounds From Middle America (vol 1) was the first in a series of compilations featuring bands from the Midwest region of America. Volume 1 was a split compilation cassette-only release featuring 22 tracks from 4 bands and is sometimes referred to as "the Buffalo tape" because of the Buffalo imprint on the cover of the tape.

A "tape release party" concert was held on December 12, 1981, featuring all four bands, at Off The Wall Hall (now called The Bottleneck) in Lawrence, KS.

The "Fresh Sounds" series was organized by Bill Rich, of Talk Talk magazine, as a way to promote regional bands nationally.

== Reception ==
Snippets of the review from "Capitol Punishment":

- "While listening to this tape over a period of several weeks, all I can say is why are these bands so talented?"
- "Get Smart! start things off with a group of songs much crisper and more alive than their recent "Words Move" EP.
- "Mortal Micronots are nothing to get thrilled about".
- "The Yardapes are happy and fun but not frivolous".
- "The Embarrassment are quite possibly the best band in America".

Snippets of the review from "The Offense":

- "Sub Pop's not the only fanzine with a tape comp. Talk Talk, never one to be beaten to the punch, takes charge here with what I assume are the area's four sharpest bands."
- "Get Smart! plays their darkest and coolest music to date. Call them my favorite bunch east of the Cal and west of Chi."
- "Mortal Micronotz are still in high school... let's hope they don't just get older and think they have to play a lot faster. Right now it's slow, soary, soft-spoken voice."
- "The Yardapes take after 'Human Sexual Response' by adopting the multi-front man stance and playing unpalatable music."

== Track listing / personnel ==
=== Side 1 ===
| Artist | Tracks | Personnel |
|---|---|---|
| Get Smart! | 1. "In The Dark"; 2. "Face"; 3. "One More Circle"; 4. "They Walk In Pairs"; 5. "That's What They Tell Me" | Marc Koch - vocals, guitar; Lisa Wertman Crowe - vocals, bass; Frank Loose - vocals, drums |
| Mortal Micronots | 1. "The Controllers"; 2. "Blond Haired Ghost"; 3. "Individuality"; 4. "The Police Song"; 5. "Daydream"; 6. "subterfuge" | Dean Lubensky - vocals; John Harper - guitar; David Dale - bass; Steve Eddy - drums |

=== Side 2 ===
| Artist | Tracks | Personnel |
|---|---|---|
| The Yard Apes | 1. "Playing With Snakes"; 2. "Living On Welfare"; 3. "Your Pretty Face"; 4. "The Long Walk"; 5. "Jungle Rots"; 6. "Never You Mind" | Steve Deno Beai; Devin Snell; Elisa Anne Hodes; Lisa Vader; Christopher B. Fowler; Bruce Andrew Eddy; Ronald B. Achelpohl |
| The Embarrassment | 1. "Dino In The Congo"; 2. "Godfrey Harold Hardy"; 3. "D-Rings"; 4. "Chapter Twelve"; 5. "Jazz Face" | John Nichols - lead vocals, keyboards; Bill Goffrier - guitar; Ron Klaus - bass; Brent Giessmann - drums |
