= Fresh Sounds from Middle America (vol 2) =

Fresh Sounds from Middle America (volume 2)

Compilation album by Various Artists
- Released: 1981
- Recorded: 1981
- Genre: Alternative Rock
- Label: Fresh Sounds (Fresh Tape 102)
- Producer: Bill Rich

Various Artists chronology
Fresh Sounds from Middle America (vol 1) (1981)	Fresh Sounds from Middle America (volume 2) (1981)	Fresh Sounds from Middle America (vol 3) (1986)

Fresh Sounds From Middle America (vol 2) was the second in a series of compilations featuring bands from the Midwest region of America. Volume 2 was a split compilation cassette-only release featuring 18 tracks from 5 bands.

The "Fresh Sounds" series was organized by Bill Rich, of Talk Talk magazine, as a way to promote regional bands nationally.

== Track listing / personnel ==
=== Side 1 ===
Artist	Tracks	Personnel
The Buckthrusters	1. "Blu Light Special"; 2. "And It Is"; 3. "The Drive"; 4. "The Moment"; 5. "Ha! Ha!"	Jim Rosencutter - bass; Britt Rosencutter - drums, vocals; Staci Stull - guitar, vocals; Greg Cowper - accordion, synthesizer, vocals; Jim Skeel - keyboards, synthesizer, vocals; Recorded and Produced by Jim Skeel, Greg Cowper and the Buckthrusters at Skeels, Wichita, KS
The New Wave Brothers	1. "New Wave Brothers Rap"; 2. "I'm The Best"; 3. "DNA Monsters"	Jim Rosencutter - all instruments, vocals; Britt Rosencutter - all instruments, vocals; Alex Erickson - all instruments, vocals; Court Thomas - all instruments, vocals

=== Side 2 ===
Artist	Tracks	Personnel
Color Entertainment	1. "Instrumental"; 2. "Come On!"; 3. "Plants"; 4. "Fruit Of The Womb"	Fred Skellenger; Kathi Inukai
Monte Montclaire	1. "Period Piece"	Monte Montclaire
The C. Lucas Experience	1. "Silliness"; 2. "Art"; 3. "Sincerity"; 4. "Indulgence"; 5. "And Acting Out"	Christopher Lucas - all sounds

== Reception ==
Snippets of the review from "The Offense":

- The Buckthrusters: "lots of synths plus accordion, guitar, bass and drums, and these guys really had a good thing going (gone now)"
- The New Wave Brothers: "a rap, a nap and a pile of crap"
- Color Entertainment: "as dull for me as it was for the live audience assembled"
- Monte Montclaire: "an overweight conceptualist who taped his voice and added echo"
- C. Lucas Experience: "an underweight conceptualist obsessed with going either deaf or blind"
