= The Micronotz =

American rock band

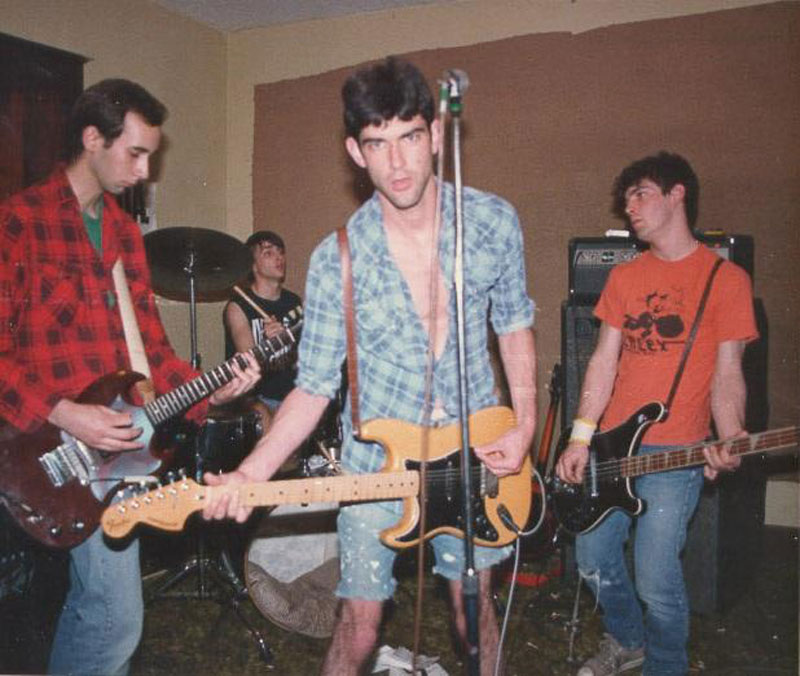

Background information
- Origin: Lawrence, Kansas, United States
- Genres: Punk rock
- Years active: 1980-1986, 1995-present
- Labels: Fresh Sounds, Homestead, Bar/None
- Members: Jay Hauptli; John Harper; Steve Eddy; Matt Kesler
- Past members: Dean Lubensky; David Dale

The Micronotz, also known as the Mortal Micronotz, were an American punk rock/alternative rock quartet formed in 1980 in Lawrence, Kansas, that, along with bands like The Embarrassment and Get Smart!, were prominent on the local music scene in Lawrence in the early 80s.

== History ==
The band formed in 1980 when all the members were still teenagers. The Embarrassment were looking for an opening band for a show they had booked on December 12, 1980 at the "Off The Wall Hall" (now known as "The Bottleneck"). The Embarrassment knew John Harper and knew that he was putting a band together, so they asked him if his band could open the show, but the band hadn't actually formed yet. At this point, the band just consisted of John Harper on guitar and David Dale on bass, so a drummer and singer needed to be recruited. Dean Lubensky and Graham Reece were recruited as vocalist and drummer. Dean was a good fit and became the permanent singer, and Steve Eddy replaced Reece as the drummer.

The band soon came to the attention of local music promoter, Bill Rich, who wrote about them for his "Talk Talk" magazine and then signed them to his Fresh Sounds record label. Their first release for Fresh Sounds was the 4-band split cassette Fresh Sounds From Middle America (vol 1) in December 1981, just one year after the band formed. The "Fresh Sounds" compilation series was organized by Bill Rich as a way to promote regional bands nationally.

When the band discovered that Bill Rich was an acquaintance of William S. Burroughs they asked for an introduction and Burroughs would end up giving them some lyrics for a song ("Old Lady Sloan" from the Mortal Micronotz album).

Lead singer Dean Lubensky left the band sometime after the 1984 Live Recording of the Video Soundtrack EP. He was replaced by Jay Hauptli, who would remain the band's vocalist throughout the rest of their career and subsequent reunions.

After releasing three albums and two EPs, the band broke up in 1986. Bassist David Dale committed suicide on Sunday, January 31, 1993. The surviving band members reunited for a memorial show which was held at the Outhouse on February 6, 1993.

Renewed interest in the band lead Fresh Sounds to release two Micronotz compilations, called Complete Recordings Volume I and II where the first volume covered the Dean Lubensky recordings and the second covered the Jay Hauptli recordings. A tribute album was also put together featuring William S. Burroughs and various other artists. The band still does the occasional reunion show, with Matt Kesler, formerly of the Pedaljets, playing bass.

In 2016 the Bar/None label digitally reissued the band's entire catalog.

== The Outhouse ==
The Outhouse was a popular venue in Lawrence for punk shows and not only did the Micronotz perform there, but they also helped get the venue into shape ready to have concerts. In 1984, the band built the stage, painted the walls and cleared the brush outside.

== Reception ==
- "these guys have your standard '70s Ameri-punk moves down cold — sort of a sub-Dead Boys, but tighter" (Jack Partain, Trouser Press)
- "Fueled by blazing electricity, right-angle tempo changes, chop-socky guitar riffs, and a vocalist who gargles glass and the leading shoe polish remover, the Micronotz go the distance to buy a metal sandwich at the 'Psychodeli'" (Judge I-Rankin, Spin, 1987)
- "Midwest teenage snot- rock at the outset, the trebly, tin-can production on early records actually worked to the bands ragged charm. The spanking riffs and barbed hooks served as a perfect backdrop for original singer Dean Lubensky's caterwaul, sounding to all the world like Janis Joplin's horny, pubescent, punked out suburban little brother." (Oliver Hunt, SuperStarcastic.com, 2006)

== Discography ==
=== Albums ===
Year	Title	Band Name	Label
1982	The Mortal Micronotz	Mortal Micronotz	Fresh Sounds
1985	The Beast That Devoured Itself	Micronotz	Fresh Sounds
1985	40 Fingers	Micronotz	Homestead
1995	Complete Recordings Volume I (1981–1984)	Micronotz	Fresh Sounds
1995	Complete Recordings Volume II (1985–1986)	Micronotz	Fresh Sounds

=== EPs ===
Year	Title	Band Name	Notes	Label
1983	Smash!	Micronotz	12", 8 songs	Fresh Sounds
1984	Live Recording of the Video Soundtrack EP	Mortal Micronotz	7", 4 song, live EP	Fresh Sounds

=== Compilations ===
Year	Title	Band Name	Notes	Label
1981	Fresh Sounds From Middle America (vol 1)	Mortal Micronotz	4-band split with Get Smart!, the Embarrassment and the Yard Apes	Fresh Sounds
1985	We Got Power No. 2:Party Animal	Micronotz	includes track "Born to Kick Ass"	Mystic Records
1986	Fresh Sounds From Middle America (vol 3)	Micronotz	includes track "Gimme Some Skin"	Fresh Sounds
1995	The Mortal Micronotz Tribute	various artists	William S. Burroughs/Eudoras, Stick, Kill Creek, Shower Trick, Cher UK, etc.	Iconoclastic Pop!

== Members ==
=== 1981-1984 ===
- Dean Lubensky - vocals
- John Harper - guitar
- David Dale - bass
- Steve Eddy - drums

=== 1985-1986 ===
- Jay Hauptli - vocals
- John Harper - guitar
- David Dale - bass (died Jan. 31, 1993)
- Steve Eddy - drums

=== 2006-present ===
- Jay Hauptli - vocals
- John Harper - guitar
- Matt Kessler - bass
- Steve Eddy - drums
