= Rhythm Pigs =

US punk-rock band from El Paso, TX

The Rhythm Pigs were an American punk band, originally from El Paso, Texas, United States, later relocated to San Francisco. Their first two albums were among the first to be released by the influential independent Mordam Records label. Their first 7-inch EP is a classic example of early hardcore, welding driving rock and roll with broad melodies and varied tempos and hooks. Their first two studio albums showed more "big tent" punk, with varied musical styles (such as the foray into rap in "Break or We'll Break Your Face" on their self-titled LP) happily shoehorned into melodic punk songs.

Touring extensively throughout Europe and North America throughout the mid-1980s, the Rhythm Pigs were one of the most sophisticated and musically diverse hardcore bands, and remained so throughout the 1980s as hardcore became more and more musically conservative. That the wistful and melodic power-ballads of El Paso would not be considered punk by most adherents has as much to do with the shifting definition of punk as it does with the mellowing of the band's sound. Baby Falcon Getaway saw a return to a more raw, fast-paced hard rock sound (the three out-and-out hardcore songs on El Paso are collected into a single track titled "The Fast Three") combined with the more humorous tone seen on the first album. Baby Falcon Getaway included a hardcore cover of the Gordon Lightfoot classic "Sundown" and a furiously paced rendition of Charles Mingus's "Boogie Stop Shuffle," which recalled the Peanuts theme (Vince Guaraldi's Linus and Lucy) from the first album.

== Personnel ==
- 1st LP: Jay Smith, Greg Adams, Ed Ivey
- 2nd LP: Kenny Craun, Greg Adams, Ed Ivey (Don Holmes, "Main Man", LP engineered by Spot)
- I'm Not Crazy, I'm an Airplane Billy Atwell from th' Inbred replaces Kenny on drums(engineered by Jeroen Visser).
- El Paso: Jay Smith, Greg Adams, Ed Ivey
- Baby Falcon Getaway Schmeckie, Jay Smith, Ed Ivey
- 'Construction' EP Ed Ivey, Schmeckie, Jay Smith

Ed Ivey currently plays sousaphone in San Francisco's North Beach Brass Band. Ed and Billy Atwell appear as themselves in the documentary "A Texas Tale of Treason" about the making of Waldo's Hawaiian Holiday, a Repo Man sequel film . Billy Atwell is a composer/producer for hire in the NYC metro area. Jay Smith has played in Bay Area bands: Tragic Mullato, GDKs, Cinnamon Girls, Sonic Brain Jam and Gone to Ground.

== Discography ==
- An American Activity 1984. 6 song 7-inch EP unclean records (cat# ur 004)
- War Between the States: South, 1985 cassette compilation. 2 songs; "Arson" and "Van Halen Hater" (cat# TPOS 042)
- The Rhythm Pigs, 1986 LP Mordam Records (cat # 2)
- Choke on This, 1987 LP Mordam Records (cat # 4)
- I'm Not Crazy, I'm an Airplane. 1988 LP Konkurrel (cat # 001-107) Recorded live at Donkiesjot (Don Quixote) Sittard Holland Nov 1987)
- El Paso 1994. CD Westworld Enterprises (cat# 13)
- Construction. 1995 Konkurrent
- Baby Falcon Getaway. 1996 CD Cool Beans Records (cat# 4)

== See also ==
Beefeater (band)
