= The Embarrassment =

American band, formed 1979

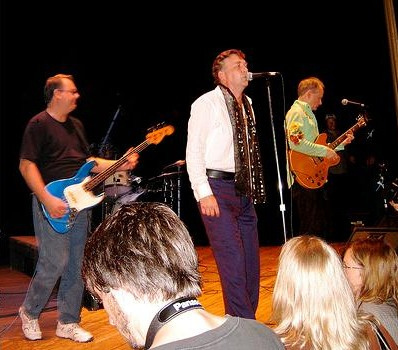
- Lawrence 2006

Background information
- Origin: Wichita, Kansas, U.S.
- Genre: Punk rock
- Years active: 1979–1983
- Labels: Fresh Sounds; Time to Develop; Bar/None; My Pal God
- Members: Bill Goffrier; John Nichols; Ron Klaus; Brent "Woody" Giessmann
- Website: Official website

The Embarrassment was an American rock band formed in 1979 in Wichita, Kansas, that was initially active from 1979 to 1983 and has reunited several times since then. The band consisted of guitarist Bill Goffrier, lead singer and organist John Nichols, bassist Ron Klaus, and drummer Brent Giessmann. After the band broke up, Giessmann played for the Del Fuegos and Goffrier formed Big Dipper. The band was considered a prominent part of the music scene in Lawrence, Kansas, in the early 1980s.

== History ==
Although some considered the band punk rock, the band described themselves as "Blister Pop". The Village Voice's long-time chief music critic Robert Christgau called them a "great lost American band". Along with bands like Get Smart! and the Mortal Micronotz, the Embarrassment were prominent in the Lawrence punk scene of the early 1980s and they would regularly play at venues like the Lawrence Opera House (now called Liberty Hall) and the Off the Wall Hall (later called Cogburn's, now called the Bottleneck).

The Embarrassment stopped performing when two of the members moved to Boston, Massachusetts. Giessmann drummed for the Del Fuegos, and Goffrier formed the band Big Dipper with former members of the Volcano Suns. Several of the Embarrassment's unreleased songs were recorded by Big Dipper, including "Faith Healer", which was later covered by the Japanese all-girl group Shonen Knife.

== Reunions ==
=== 1980s ===
The Embarrassment played a reunion show on New Year's Eve in 1985 at Cogburn's in Lawrence. Geissmann was unable to participate, as he was on tour with the Del Fuegos.

They played the following New Year's Eve at Cogburn's, with all four original members participating. Also on the bill was another Kansas band, the Micronotz. In 1988–1989, they converged again for three reunion shows: one on New Year's at Big Dog Studio in Wichita and the next two at the Bottleneck on January 5 and 6. The Moving Van Goghs opened the show on January 5, and the Sin City Disciples opened the show on January 6.

=== 2000s ===
The Embarrassment played a few reunion shows in 2006, first at the Roadhouse in Wichita, with Local Band on August 18 and the Sluggos on August 19. On August 20, the band performed at Liberty Hall, with special guests Kill Creek and the Micronotz. The Embarrassment performed an acoustic concert on August 30, 2008, at John Barleycorn's in Wichita. The performance was opened by Giessmann solo on electric piano for a few songs, then the local group the Sluggos. The original trio of Goffrier, Nichols, and Giessmann then took the stage with Eric Cale (cover artist for the 1983 Death Travels West album) on upright bass and Freedy Johnston on additional guitar and backing vocals. Some new or previously unperformed work was presented, including the song "Carpshoot", written by Ron Klaus, who was not able to attend. Johnston closed the night with his solo work.

=== 2020s ===
Following a screening of We Were Famous, You Don't Remember: The Embarrassment, on June 30, 2023, Goffrier and Nichols reunited for an 18-song set at Liberty Hall. The duo was joined by Britt Rosencutter on drums and Cale on bass.

== Legacy ==
Kansas-born political writer Thomas Frank quoted lyrics from their song "Sex Drive" in his bestselling 2004 book What's the Matter with Kansas?.

A feature-length documentary about the band, titled We Were Famous, You Don't Remember: The Embarrassment, premiered at the 2022 Tallgrass Film Festival in Wichita, Kansas. The film was named the best music documentary of 2023 in Spin by Bob Guccione Jr., founder of Spin.

== Discography ==
=== Singles/EPs ===
- 1980: "Sex Drive"/"Patio Set" (Big Time - 7-inch)
- 1981: The Embarrassment 5-song EP (Cynykyl Records - 12-inch 45 rpm)
- 1981: Fresh Sounds from Middle America (vol 1) 5-song EP (Fresh Sounds - cassette)
- 1989: "Beautiful Day" (Bar/None promo CD single, from God Help Us album)

=== Albums ===
- 1983: Death Travels West (Fresh Sounds - mini LP)
- 1990: God Help Us (Bar/None - LP and CD)
- 2001: Blister Pop (My Pal God - CD)

=== Compilation albums ===
- 1984: The Embarrassment Retrospective (Fresh Sounds - cassette)
- 1987: The Embarrassment (Time to Develop - LP)
- 1995: Heyday 1979–83 (Bar/None - double CD)

=== Compilation appearances ===
- 1981: Battle of the Garages (Bomp! Records - LP)
- 1981: Sub Pop 5 (Sub Pop - cassette)
- 1982: Sub Pop 7 (Sub Pop - cassette)
- 1988: Human Music (Homestead - LP, CD, cassette)
- 1989: Time for a Change: Bar/None Sampler No. Two (Bar/None - CD, cassette)

== Reception ==
- "In the early 1980s, Wichita, Kansas's Embarrassment secretly set a template for American indie-rock: edgy, rocking tunes full of clever wordplay and subtle wit, as played by four guys in thick glasses. They fell somewhere between the Feelies' perpetual nervousness and the Replacements' inebriated garage-rock; it's hard to think of many other peers from their era."—Mike Appelstein,
- "From exotic Wichita, with a gift for hookily hypnotic guitar lines that need a haircut... Now that I've finally gotten the message, a year and a half after this great lost American band dispersed into the wilds of Wichita, I still can't repeat it back to you."—Robert Christgau, The Village Voice
- "Before they broke up in 1983, this quartet from Wichita, Kansas rocked furiously, with less brittle/more melodious guitar than the Scottish new wave pop bands Orange Juice and Joseph K to whom the Embos were sometimes compared."—Jim Green/Ira Robbins/Jack Partain, Trouser Press
- "The group's eclectic yet distinctive sound wrapped a post-punk approach and a deadpan sense of humor around pop, country, disco, and metal elements, crafting songs that rivaled the work of better-known contemporaries like Gang of Four, Mission of Burma, and the Feelies."—Heather Phares, AllMusic
- "They played tight, blistering pop songs when overproduced stadium-rock anthems and repetitive disco tracks were the norm... The Embarrassment continues to foster a national reputation as 'The best band you never heard of.'"—Jon Niccum, Lawrence Journal-World
