= Mordam Records =

American record distribution company

Mordam Records was a California record distribution company for independent record labels. It was founded in San Francisco in 1983 as an independent punk distribution company by Ruth Schwartz (one of the original co-editors of Maximum RocknRoll). Mordam was the exclusive distributor for dozens of punk rock and independent record labels throughout the 1980s and 90s, gaining a reputation as one of the few "distros" that paid their labels on time.

Following the departure of Lookout! Records and Man's Ruin from its distribution network in 2000, Schwartz moved the company to Sacramento. She subsequently sold Mordam outright to Lumberjack Distribution in 2005. It continued as a part of the Lumberjack Mordam Music Group. With record sales in decline throughout the industry, the company went out of business in 2009.

== History ==
=== Background ===
Independent record companies are frequently started by music fans, for many of whom commerce is secondary and financial skills are minimal. Customarily such record labels send their finished products to intermediaries known as "distributors" on consignment, with these middlemen adding an additional markup and selling these goods in bulk to retail outlets. The label is thus placed in a position of making a loan of its products to its distributors, hoping that sales will be made and money returned in compensation.

Prior to 2005 the bulk of the recorded music purchased in the United States happened through major retail chains such as Borders, Barnes & Noble and Walmart, and the like. The only way for an independent record label to gain access to these channels was through well-connected distributors. With many retail chains and large, corporate distributors slow to pay and demand for new and fresh products driving the market, it was frequently only the fear of being denied the expeditious delivery of new releases that motivated payment — a coercive mechanism difficult for a small label to generate. Explains independent record industry veteran Todd Taylor:

"The ideal label works on making and releasing quality music it believes in. The ideal independent distributor works toward creating a safe umbrella for smaller labels to survive under and uses their strength in numbers. Distributors then use that collective strength to send the music out and collect the money that comes back in. They take a fee or percentage of sales for their services and cut the labels a check at regular intervals. In turn, the labels are supposed to pay royalties to their artists from those music sales."

Mordam Records was one such independent record distributor, concentrating on the wholesale sale of punk rock records, compact discs, and magazines.

=== Establishment ===
Mordam Records (the name a play on "More Damn Records") was established in 1983 in San Francisco, California, by Ruth Schwartz, an original co-editor of Maximum RocknRoll (MRR). The company's survival and growth was fueled by its exclusive distribution agreements with MRR and Alternative Tentacles, the record label owned by Dead Kennedys frontman Jello Biafra.

The label quickly gained a reputation with its associate labels for fair-dealing and timeliness, with Lee Joseph of Dionysus Records recalling that "checks arrived the same time every month with a statement" from the beginning of his association with Mordam in 1985 until its termination — a situation which Joseph categorized as "fabulous."

=== Structure ===
The company depicted itself as a wholesale producers' cooperative — or in its own words, "a group of record labels and publishers who sell their products together." Labels associating themselves with Mordam granted the company exclusive distribution rights, with the company selling products to other wholesale distributors around the world as well as dealing directly with hundreds of record stores. The company produced monthly photocopied flyers detailing "new releases" of associated labels as well as semi-annual catalogs depicting and describing all available titles each fall and spring.

Building its business upon the lucrative Dead Kennedys catalog of San Francisco's Alternative Tentacles records and monthly sales of the popular Maximum Rocknroll magazine, Mordam initially concentrated on labels hailing from the Pacific coast, including California labels Allied Recordings, Lookout Records, Flipside Records, Dr. Strange Records, and Sympathy for the Record Industry as well as Empty Records and Kill Rock Stars from the state of Washington. Mordam Records also manufactured and distributed a small number of titles under its own name, featuring such punk-noise bands as Victims Family and Rhythm Pigs.

Through 2000 Mordam maintained a warehouse and sales office located at 2020 Cesar Chavez Blvd. in San Francisco.

=== Move to Sacramento ===
Late in 2000, with sales declining throughout the music industry, Mordam moved from costly San Francisco to a lower cost location in Sacramento. Sales for the company, which had peaked at approximately $10 million per year steadily atrophied due to a lessening demand for physical products across the music industry. The departure earlier that year of Lookout Records with its highly marketable catalog, featuring such bands as Green Day, Screeching Weasel, The Queers, and Mr. T Experience, was an important contributing factor in the faltering financial fortunes of the company which necessitated a change of location.

The new Mordam site was 731 N Market Blvd., Unit R in Sacramento from the end of 2000 onwards.

In a further effort to economize, catalog production shifted from a semi-annual to an annual basis beginning in 2001.

=== Sale to Lumberjack ===
After about 20 years in the record business, Mordam owner Ruth Schwartz began to feel alienated from her job and the record industry as a whole. Moreover, digital music distribution had begun to entrench itself, shifting the form of the production-distribution business model. In a 2009 interview Schwartz recalled:

"I was tired and pissed off.... I did not have a good attitude any more. 'I hate my job. I hate the industry. I gotta get out of here'.... [There was] also a generational divide with a lot of younger people coming into the music scene. People born after 1980 are jumpy. They move fast. When businesses were going down 20 percent, people started to bail."

Schwartz recognized that the future of Mordam, if it was to survive, would be as a service company — a digital aggregator and distributor. Exhausted and unwilling to adapt to the changing business environment, Schwartz began to seek a purchaser for Mordam Records. She found it difficult to sell the firm, however, since affiliated labels contractually retained the right to walk away from the exclusive distribution agreement with the Mordam at will.

A suitor was found in the form of Lumberjack Distribution, a somewhat younger wholesale distribution operation built around Doghouse Records which CEO Dirk Hemsath declared had been built "in what we perceived as Mordam's image." Price of the sale was said to be in the range of $200,000 to $300,000. The new combined entity adopted the name Lumberjack Mordam Music Group (LMMG), with Hemsath taking on the role of CEO and President.

The purchase meant a change of business terms for the Mordam-affiliated labels, with Mordam's former voluntary "at will" affiliation agreements to be replaced by contractual exclusivity agreements. A handful of labels including Dirtnap Records and Adeline Records exited as a result of the merger. At least some existing labels were allowed to keep their former "at will" exclusive distribution contracts.

=== Lumberjack Mordam Music Group ===
With the comparatively small Lumberjack Distribution (owned by Dirk Hemsath of Doghouse Records) absorbing the powerful and established Mordam to form LMMG, a revamped and expanded system of sales and shipping was needed. A contract was signed with WEA, the distribution arm of major label Warner Brothers Music calling for WEA to directly pick, pack, and ship music to certain national chain store accounts via a WEA-affiliated entity called Cinram. In accordance with this agreement, affiliated labels (including those formerly under the Mordam umbrella) were to ship physical goods directly to Cinram warehouse. LMMG hoped for first year sales in the $15 to 20 million range, thereby growing business and income of its affiliated labels.

LMMG found itself hamstrung by plummeting CD sales and a shift to digital music sales and by a difficult financial relationship with Warner Brothers, which in exchange for money loaned to LMMG had negotiated a favorable compensation agreement for itself, ultimately to the detriment of affiliated labels.

As 2007 progressed LMMG began to find its financial situation untenable as the retail record industry contracted wildly, and the unfavorable financial situation with respect to WEA became ever more tangled. CEO Hemsath retreated from the wholesale operation to dedicate attention to his successful label, which had since moved to New York City.

By 2008 payments to labels had fallen well behind schedule. As payments were missed and contracts expired, labels would leave the distributor, further contracting revenue. New labels were added in an attempt to fill the gap, with a total of 116 independent labels ultimately attached to LMMG by the time of its termination in May 2009.

LMMG was notified by the Ohio Secretary of State on April 20, 2009 that its articles of incorporation had been canceled by the state and that it was "not in good standing." The company's operations were abruptly halted shortly thereafter with the company remaining in arrears to many of its affiliated labels.

== Mordam Records releases ==
- MDR-1 Faith No More We Care a Lot, 1985
- MDR-2 Rhythm Pigs self-titled, 1986
- MDR-3 Victim's Family Voltage and Violets, 1986
- MDR-4 Rhythm Pigs Choke on this, 1987
- MDR-5 The Ex Too Many Cowboys, 1987
- MDR-6 Mannequin Beach Don't Laugh, You're Next, 1988
- MDR-7 Victim's Family Things I Hate to Admit, 1988
- MDR-8 Victim's Family White Bread Blues, 1990
- MDR-9 Victim's Family Son of a Church Card/Quivering Lip 7"

== Exclusive labels (1987-2005) ==
- 5 Rue Christine (1998- )
- A-F Records (2002- )
- Ace Fu Records (2003- )
- Acute Records (2004- )
- Adeline Records (2000- )
- Alive Records (2002- )
- Allied Recordings ( -1999)
- Alternative Tentacles (1983- )
- American Pop Project (1998-2001)
- Amity Records ( -1994)
- Amphetamine Reptile Records (1993-1995)
- Archive International Productions (2003- )
- Asian Man Records (1997- )
- Au-Go-Go Records (1997-2002)
- Bacchus Archives
- Bomp! Records (2003- )
- Broken Rekids
- Carpark Records (2004- )
- Chunksaah Records (2003- )
- Coalition Records (2004- )
- Crypt Records (2000- )
- Desolation Row Records ( -1993)
- Dionysus Records
- Dirtnap Records (2002- )
- Disaster Records (2002- )
- Dr. Strange Records
- Eccentric Pop Records (1996- )
- Empty Records
- Estrus Records (1996-1998)
- File 13 Records (2001- )
- Flipside Records ( -1996)
- Frontier Records (2003- )
- Gearhead Records (2000-2001)
- Gern Blansten Records (2000- )
- Gold Standard Laboratories (2001- )
- Gravity Records (1996- )
- Hell Yeah
- Initial Records (2003- )
- Jade Tree (1990- )
- Johann's Face Records (1997- )
- Kill Rock Stars ( -2001)
- Kirbdog Records ( -1996)
- Level Plane Records (2003- )
- Load Records (2003- )
- Lookout Records (1988-2000)
- Man's Ruin Records (1996- )
- Maximum Rockroll Records(1983- )
- Mordam Records
- Mr. Lady Records (1999-2004)
- New Day Rising (2004- )
- New Red Archives (2001- )
- Orange Sky Records (2001- )
- Other People's Music (1997- )
- Polyvinyl Record Company (1999- )
- Prank Records (1996- )
- Punk In My Vitamins Records (1999- )
- Punkcore Records (2001- )
- Rip Off Records (1996- )
- Second Nature Recordings (2004- )
- Scooch Pooch Records (2001- )
- Seeland Records
- Shredder Records ( -2001)
- Six Weeks (1999- )
- Slowdance Records (2004- )
- Sound Pollution Records (1997- )
- Substandard Records (2002- )
- Suicide Squeeze Records (2001- )
- Swami Records (2003- )
- Sympathy for the Record Industry
- TKO Records (2000-2003)
- The Committee to Keep Music Evil (2002- )
- Three-One-G (2001- )
- Total Energy Records (2002- )
- Troubleman Unlimited (1999- )
- Vengeance Records (2002- )
- Vermiform Records (1993- )
- Vinyl Communications ( -2002)
- Voxx Records (2003- )
- Wrong Stuff Records (1992- )

== See also ==
- List of record labels
