= Victims Family =

American hardcore punk band

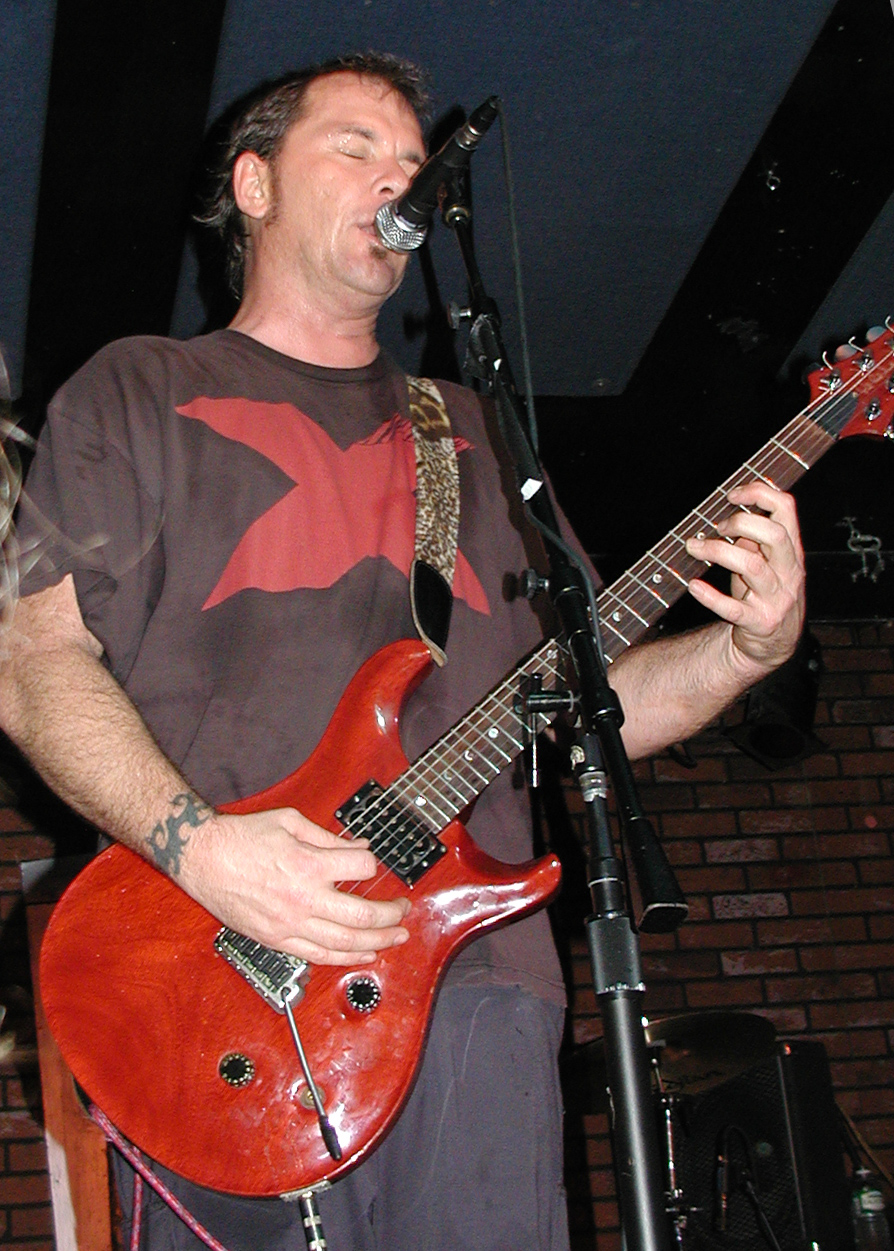
- Ralph Spight

Background information
- Origin: Santa Rosa, California
- Genres: Hardcore punk
- Years active: 1984–2001; 2004; 2009; 2011; 2012; 2019–present
- Labels: Mordam Records, Alternative Tentacles, Saint Rose Records
- Members: Ralph Spight; Larry Boothroyd; Tim Solyan
- Past members: Devon VrMeer; Eric Strand; David Gleza

Victims Family is a hardcore punk band formed in 1984 in Santa Rosa, California, by bass guitarist Larry Boothroyd and guitarist and vocalist Ralph Spight. Devon VrMeer completed the trio as drummer. Over the years, Victims Family went through four drummers and two break-ups. Their name was taken from a piece by the cartoonist B. Kliban.

They are known for an eclectic style, with a summary from Allmusic stating: "Since its inception, the trio has refused to be pigeonholed to any single musical style — incorporating elements of hardcore punk, jazz, funk, hard rock, and noise into its challenging sound".

== History ==
In 1984, Victims Family played their first show at the Kennilworth Recreation Center in Petaluma, California, where they later opened for Faith No More and Suicidal Tendencies. In summer 1985, the band made their first U.S. tour, which they booked themselves by mailing out a cassette demo. They played with NOFX in Albuquerque and challenged Tales of Terror to a drinking contest in Dallas. Also that year, they opened for the Dead Kennedys, Descendents and Social Unrest at the Novato Theater, where they first caught the attention of Jello Biafra. In 1986, they opened for the Butthole Surfers and Camper Van Beethoven at Mabuhay Gardens in San Francisco, and recorded their first album, Voltage and Violets, for Ruth Schwartz's Mordam Records, and regularly played The Farm and Club Foot in San Francisco. 1986 was also the year they played at a pizza parlor in Oakland with Nomeansno, beginning a long friendship between the two bands.

In 1987, they barely completed a tour of the United States and missed their dates in Canada after being banned from that country for one year. Highlights included playing with Capitol Punishment in Fresno and Scratch Acid in Dallas. A second album, Things I Hate To Admit, was recorded in 1988 at Prairie Sun Studio in Cotati, California.

In 1988, they began their friendship with Primus, with whom they shared the stage many times in the years to follow.

In 1989, they were invited by Konkurrent, a record label in Amsterdam, for a European tour. VrMeer had left the band to raise a family, so Eric Strand was recruited as drummer. The band embarked on a five-week tour of Europe with Snuff from London supporting them. Highlights included helping to break down the Berlin Wall and being strip searched in Norway. After returning from Europe, Strand was replaced by the roadie Tim Solyan who continued to drum for Victims Family throughout the height of their touring days.

Their third album, White Bread Blues, produced by the Nomeansno drummer John Wright, followed in 1990 and was received on a much wider critical and commercial scale than their earlier albums. It included the song "'Caged Bird", which reached No. 16 on the Dutch VPRO radio charts. Around this time, Mr. Bungle and Green Day, then little known acts, often opened for Victims Family. Also in 1990, they supported Tad and Nirvana on the midwest leg of their cross-country tour. Numerous tours of the US and Europe cemented the group's reputation as an incendiary live act. Their fourth album, The Germ, released in 1992 and also produced by John Wright, was their first for Alternative Tentacles Records. The band's schedule began to take its toll, and in 1992 they took a break.

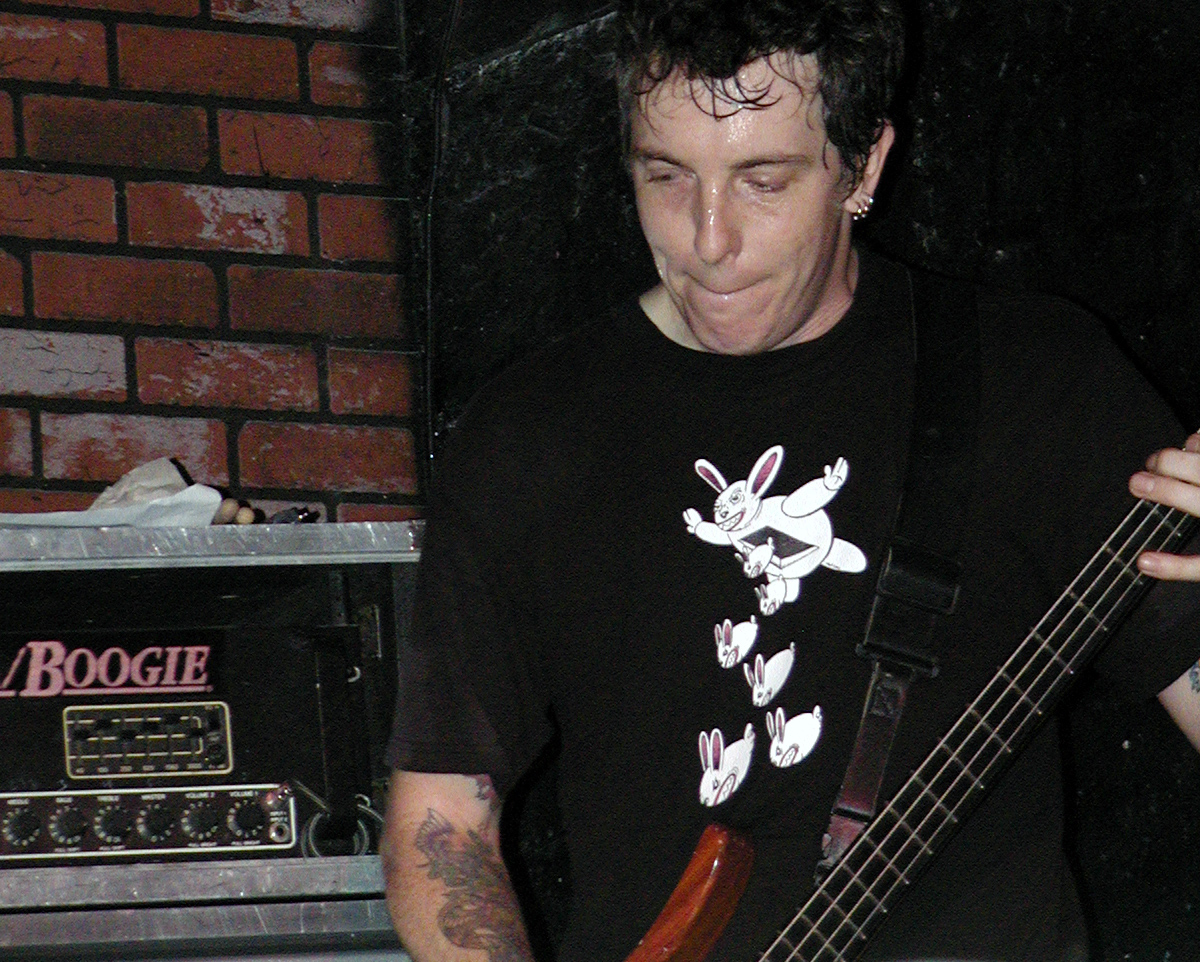
Larry Boothroyd

Ten months later, in spring 1993, Victims Family reformed, to play a sold-out show at the Kennel Club in San Francisco. A fifth album, Headache Remedy, was released by Alternative Tentacles in February 1994. Four Great Thrash Songs, the last album of the classic line-up was recorded live in 1994 at their final show at Melkweg in Amsterdam, the band's home from home. Founding members Spight and Boothroyd also formed the bands Saturn's Flea Collar and Hellworms, both of which toured the US and Europe and recorded albums for Alternative Tentacles.

After the demise of Hellworms, Spight and Boothroyd continued under the name Victims Family with a new drummer David Gleza of My Name and they recorded the album Apocalicious in 2001. The band continued to tour relentlessly, including two trips to Texas for SXSW, and two more tours of Europe, causing the band to lose Gleza to tour fatigue. This time Spight and Boothroyd decided not to look for another drummer.

Tim Solyan

On December 11 and 12, 2004, Victims Family reunited, with Solyan back on drums, at the Phoenix Theatre in Petaluma, California, and in San Francisco at the Bottom of the Hill, to celebrate their 20th anniversary with all their different incarnations, including The Freak Accident (Spight's solo project) and Meowmeow and the Meowmeows (Boothroyd's new band). Also included at this time was a Saturn's Flea Collar 10th anniversary reunion and a Hellworms reunion. This sparked subsequent shows with both Hellworms and Victims Family. In 2006, Boothroyd began playing with the Bay Area band that came to be known as Triclops! and began touring and releasing records with them. The Freak Accident released an LP on Alternative Tentacles and toured Europe with Nomeansno. Triclops! released a full-length album, Out of Africa, on Alternative Tentacles in March 2008, and a their follow-up, Helpers On The Other Side, also on Alternative Tentacles, in 2010.

In 2009, the band appeared at the Phoenix Theater in Petaluma with Nomeansno and also for Alternative Tentacles 30th Anniversary shows in San Francisco with Alice Donut, Jello Biafra and the Guantanamo School of Medicine, Spight's latest band.

In 2010, Victims Family was invited to play in the Czech Republic with Nomeansno, Le Silo (Japan), and a group of Cuban dancers and typewriter players to celebrate a friend's 50th birthday. This turned into a whirlwind mini-tour in Europe where they played nine shows in nine days. In 2012, they released the "Have A Nice Day" single on Alternative Tentacles, made another short tour of Europe and played a handful of Northern California shows. In May 2012 VF made a return trip to Europe for 13 shows that included the bands first ever shows in Finland.

2014 marked the 30yr Anniversary and the band performed a commemorative show at the Phoenix Theater in Petaluma, CA that featured an opening band lineup with each of the members other current bands. Tim with Black Cat Grave, Larry with Brubaker and Ralph with The Sea Men.

January 2019 marked the beginning of a tight relationship with Portland band Nasalrod which features Spit Stix of FEAR on drums. The bands embarked on a 10 show West Coast run and then another Norcal run of shows in 2022. Shortly after this, both bands went into writing mode and each band worked up 5 new songs to be released on a planned upcoming split 12".

In December 2022, the band was offered a 2 week run with the Paul Green Rock Academy which featured a cavalcade of young musician students and Butthole Surfers singer Gibby Haynes. The tour rolled from San Diego to Seattle with a total of 9 shows.

In early 2024, both Victims Family and Nasalrod completed the recording and mixing of their respective 5 new songs and the split 12" 'In The Modern Meatspace" was released in 2024 on Nasalrod bass player Mandy Morgans' label Nadine Records.

In November 2024, the band were asked to open 3 shows on the West Coast for Pinback. The first show was at the Fillmore in San Francisco which VF had not performed at since 1994.

December 2024, the band made a trek up to the South West corner of Canada to play 3 shows with Nomeansno drummer John Wrights' new band Dead Bob with the Invasives supporting all 3 shows.

== Line-up ==
- Ralph Spight – guitar, vocals
- Larry Boothroyd – bass guitar
- Tim Solyan – drums (1989–1994; 2004–present)

Past drummers:

- Devon VrMeer (1984–1988)
- Eric Strand (1988–1989)
- Dave Gleza (2001–2002)

== Discography ==
=== Albums ===
- 1986 Voltage and Violets LP – Mordam Records
- 1988 Things I Hate to Admit LP – Mordam Records
- 1990 White Bread Blues LP/CD – Mordam Records (1990's CD issue contains Things I Hate to Admit; reissued 2010 on Saint Rose Records)
- 1992 The Germ LP/CD – Alternative Tentacles
- 1994 Headache Remedy LP/CD – Alternative Tentacles
- 1995 Four Great Thrash Songs LP/CD – Alternative Tentacles
- 2001 Apocalicious LP/CD – Alternative Tentacles
- 2024 In The Modern Meatspace LP - Split 12" with Nasalrod – Nadine Records

=== Singles and compilations ===
- 1986 The Only Way and Times Beach on Lethal Noise compilation – not on a label
- 1986 Devon Drool, Sir Onslaught and Work on Bay Mud compilation – not on a label
- 1986 Lock of Interest on Viva Umkhonto! compilation – Mordam Records/Konkurrel Records
- 1988 Son of a Church Card/Quivering Lip 7-inch – Mordam Records
- 1990 Burly Jalisco on Sasquatch compilation 7-inch – Kirbdog
- 1990 Sinatra Mantra on The Big One – Flipside Records
- 1991 My Evil Twin on split 7-inch with Coffin Break – Rave Records
- 1991 Ill in the Head on Virus 100 Compilation LP – Alternative Tentacles
- 1993 Maybe if I... 7-inch – Alternative Tentacles
- 1996 Project Fake ~ A tribute to the Minutemen – Easy Money Records
- 2001 Dr. Schlesinger on split 7-inch with Fleshies – Alternative Tentacles
- 2002 Fridge on compilation Apocalypse Always – Alternative Tentacles
- 2002 Victims Family w/ The Jayroon Lovers Bonjour, Gutentag, Hallo. - Strike Records
- 2012 Have A Nice Day/Let's Cancel The Future 7-inch – Alternative Tentacles
