= Words Move =

EP by Get Smart!
- Released: December 8, 1981
- Recorded: May 1981
- Studios: Ramona Recording, Lawrence, KS
- Genre: Post-punk
- Length: 9:07
- Label: Syntax
- Producer: Dave Stuckey

Get Smart! chronology
Numbers and Colours (1981)	Words Move (1981)	World Without End (1985)

Words Move is a 4-track EP by Get Smart!, released on Syntax Records on December 8, 1981. It was recorded at Ramona Studios in Lawrence, KS and produced by Dave Stuckey, of the Dave and Deke Combo. The track "Eat, Sleep A Go-Go" from this EP was included on the Sub Pop #5 cassette compilation.

== Track listing ==
Side 1:

1. "Disillusion" - 2:03
2. "Where Did This Week Go?" - 1:55

Side 2:

1. "Eat, Sleep A Go-Go" - 2:17
2. "This Is Style" - 2:48

== Reception ==
- "Get Smart! is a trio of Kansans with brains and a beat. You may prefer bassist Lisa Wertman's vocals over guitarist Marc Koch's but eventually every stark melody on this EP will wheedle its way into your head (and then move onto your feet). This seven incher also features the same version of GS! smash hit "Eat, Sleep A Go-Go" that you heard on Sub Pop 5" (New York Rocker, June 1982)
- "We're particularly impressed with Words Move, the new four-song EP debut from Get Smart!. Highlights are "Where Did This Week Go?" a song about being dog-tired to a slowed down B-52's beat (or Pylon at its natural speed) and "Eat, Sleep A Go-Go," which is minimal to Cramps proportions with its own unique set of dissonances." (Cary Baker, Illinois Entertainer, 1982)
- "Four-song offering of sparse brains-and-beat music from a Lawrence, KS new-rock trio that already has reaped some praise with independent releases." (Bart Becker, Lincoln Evening Journal, 1982)
- "Twangy, big-beat minimalism with a Dave Byrne-ish singer" (Trouser Press, 1982)
- "Get Smart sports a catchy, beaty minimalism and a modern "lost in a supermarket" viewpoint. A strong debut, more encouraging new music from the Midwest, I'm looking forward to hearing more. Sharp packaging too." (Jim Manion, The Bloomington Free Rider, 1982)

== Personnel ==
- Marc Koch - vocals, guitar
- Lisa Wertman Crowe - vocals, bass
- Frank Loose - drums
