= McPherson Opera House =

- U.S. National Register of Historic Places
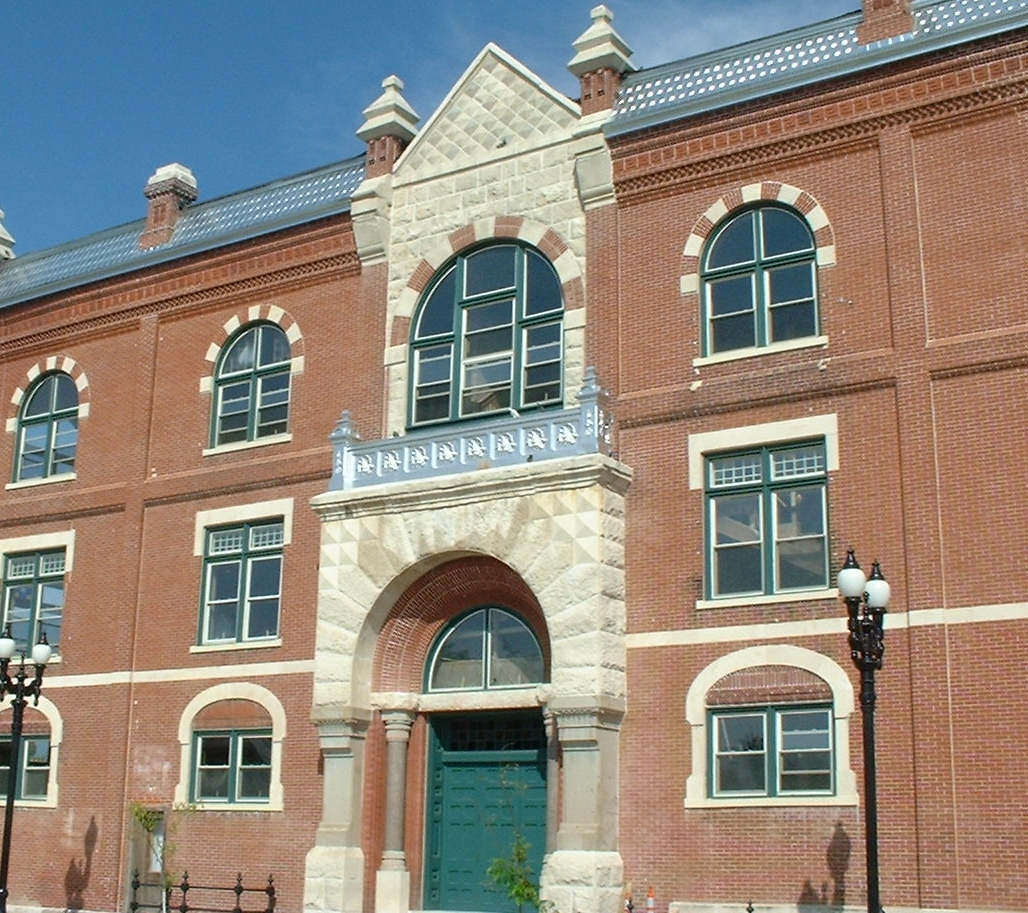
- Entrance to the McPherson Opera House

- Location within Kansas Location within the United States
- Location: McPherson, Kansas
- Coordinates: 38°22′2″N 97°39′59″W
- Built: 1888
- Architect: W.G. Reynolds; Ellison & Linn
- NRHP reference No.: 72001452
- Added to NRHP: March 16, 1972

McPherson Opera House is an historic opera building at 221 South Main Street in McPherson, Kansas.

The house was built in 1888, opened in 1889 and added to the National Historic Register in 1972.
