= Kansas City International Raceway =

Racing track in Kansas City, Missouri, US

Coordinates: 38°58′37″N 94°25′14″W

- Location: 8259 South Noland Rd. Kansas City, Missouri
- Owner: JMK Enterprises
- Opened: 1967
- Closed: November 27th, 2011

Dragstrip
- Surface: Asphalt

Kansas City International Raceway was a drag-racing track in Kansas City, Missouri. It was built in 1967, and featured two asphalt lanes, and seating for over a thousand people. It hosted its last race on November 27, 2011. The 93 acre property was purchased by the city of Kansas City, Missouri to build what became Little Blue Valley Park.
