= Get Smart! (band) =

American post-punk band

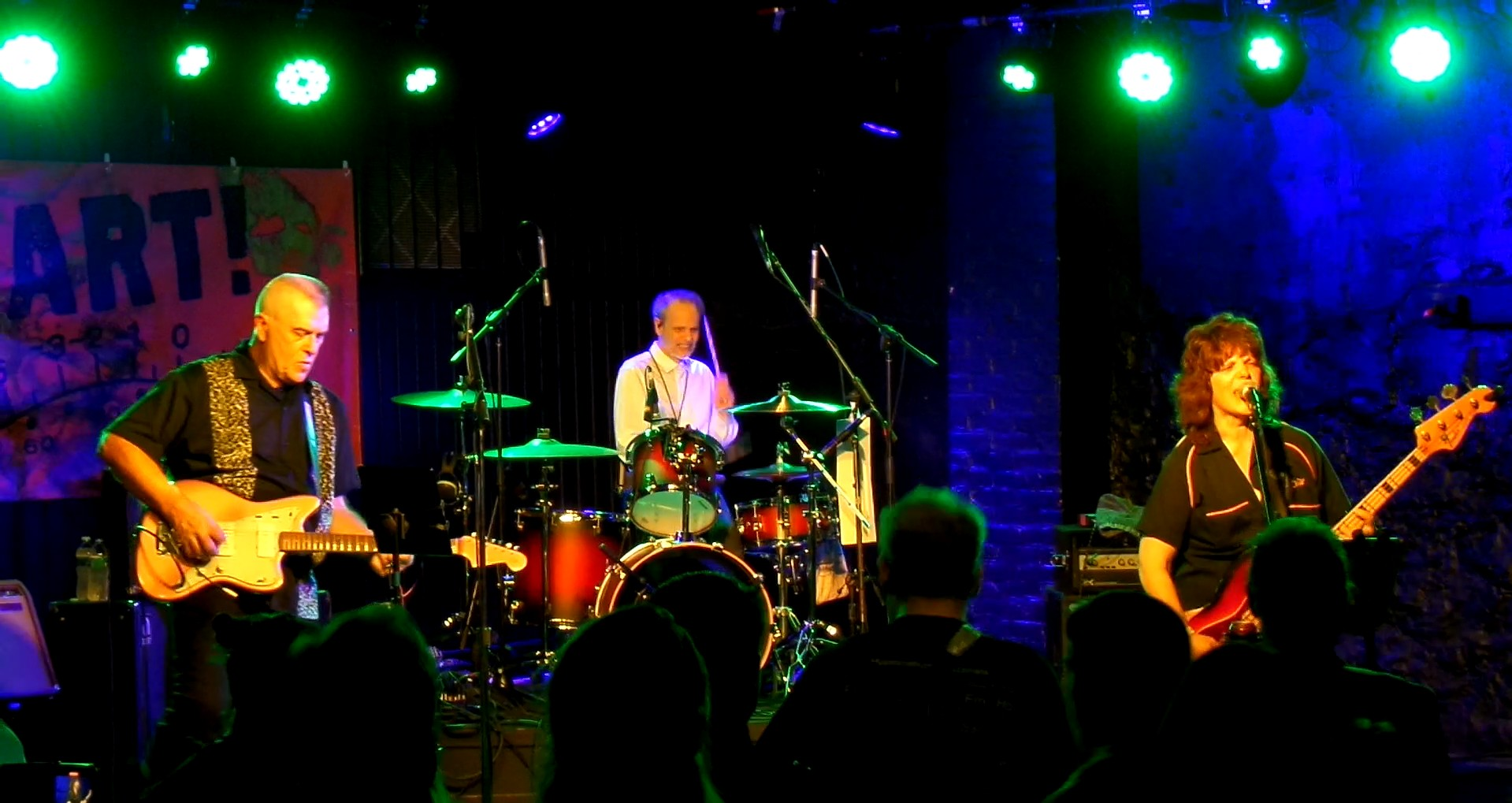
- Get Smart! live in 2021

Background information
- Origin: Lawrence, Kansas; Chicago, Illinois
- Genres: Post-punk, Punk rock, alternative rock, new wave
- Years active: 1980–1990, 2020-present
- Labels: Fresh Sounds, Fever, Restless, Enigma, Syntax, Capitol Punishment
- Members: Marcus Koch; Lisa Wertman Crowe; Frank Loose
- Past members: Ric Menck; Jay Sebastian; Bob Lara
- Website: Official website

Get Smart! is a three-piece post-punk band formed in Lawrence, Kansas, in 1980 consisting of Marcus Koch, Lisa Wertman Crowe and Frank Loose. The band released 2 studio albums along with some singles and EPs over a 10-year career. The band re-united in 2020.

== Career ==
The band formed while at University of Kansas in 1980 and, along with bands like the Embarrassment, and the Mortal Micronotz, they were prominent in the alternative music scene in Lawrence. They released their first record in 1981, which was a flexi disc released with "Talk Talk" magazine. This was followed by a self-released 4-track EP called Words Move. They had 5 songs on the four band split cassette, released by Fresh Sounds Records, called Fresh Sounds From Middle America (vol 1) (the four bands being Get Smart!, the Embarrassment, the Yard Apes and the Mortal Micronotz). In 1982 they relocated to Chicago, Illinois. The group were signed by Colin Camerer to his Fever Records label (an independent label in Philadelphia, Pennsylvania) and released their first album, Action Reaction in 1984. Their second album, Swimming with Sharks, was released in 1986 on Enigma Records' "Restless Records" imprint.

The band received considerable coverage in Nebraska's Capitol Punishment fanzine.

== Line-Up Changes ==
In 1987 Bob Lara, from the band Reaction, was added as a second guitarist. Shortly afterwards, Frank Loose left the band. He was originally replaced in 1988 by Ric Menck. Menck only stayed with the band for a short time. He was replaced by Jay Sebastian (a.k.a. "Redd Klaats"). Sebastian left the band after about a year, at which they continued as an acoustic trio until they disbanded in 1990.

== After Get Smart! ==
- Lisa Wertman continued performing with Bob Lara as "The Lisa and Bob Show" for about a year. Then she joined the band Dolly Varden as a founding member. Later she would perform with the Nora O'Connor Band, the Honeybees and Jeanie B and the Jelly Beans, and now plays in Damaged Gods, a Gang of Four tribute, and My Biggest Thrills.
- Marcus Koch moved back to Lawrence and currently plays in the Honky-tonk band "Cryin' Out Loud".
- Bob Lara has played in many local Chicago bands and has participated in several re-unions of his old band "Reaction".
- Ric Menck went on to form Velvet Crush
- Jay Sebastian went on to form the "Twang Bang" duo.

== Reunion ==
On February 5, 2020, the band announced via its Facebook page that they would be reuniting, with the original line-up, for a 40th anniversary show, to take place at the Bottleneck in Lawrence, KS on November 7, 2020. The band's first concert was on October 31, 1980. The reunion concern was postponed because of the COVID-19 pandemic and took place on November 6, 2021.

== Band members ==
- Marcus Koch – guitar, lead vocals (1980–1990, 2020)
- Lisa Wertman Crowe – bass, lead vocals (1980–1990, 2020)
- Frank Loose – drums, lead vocals (1980–1987, 2020)

Past members

- Ric Menck – drums (1988)
- Jay Sebastian (a.k.a. "Redd Klaats") – drums (1988–1989) died 2024
- Bob Lara – guitar, vocals (1988–1990) died 2026

== Discography ==
Frank Loose, Lisa Wertman Crowe and Marcus Koch circa 1980, Lawrence, KS

=== Singles and EPs ===
- "Numbers and Colours" / "Ankle Deep In Mud" (1981 flexi, Fresh Sounds) (with "Talk Talk" magazine, 1981-05-13)
- Words Move (4 song EP, Syntax, 1981-12-08)
- Fresh Sounds from Middle America (vol 1) (split/cassette, Fresh Sounds, 1981-12-12)
- "Back Into The Future" / "World Without End" (1985 live, Fever/Enigma)
- "Gold To Rust" (1987 45, Enigma Europe)
- "Oh Yeah No" (6 song EP, Capitol Punishment, 2020-11-17)

=== Albums ===
- Get Smart! (1981, 11 song demo tape)
- Action Reaction (1984, 12 song LP, Fever/Enigma)
- Swimming with Sharks (1986, 10 song LP, Restless/Enigma)

=== Compilation appearances ===
- Inspiration Series No. 1 (German cassette) – included "On And On" (different version)
- Sub Pop No. 5 – included "Eat, Sleep A Go-Go" (from the "Words Move" EP)
- Sub Pop No. 7 – included "Black Mirror" (different version)
- Enigma Variations – included "Just For The Moment" (from Action Reaction)
- Restless Variations – included "Back Into The Future" (from Swimming with Sharks)
- Heat From The Wind Chill Factory — included "What It Is We Fear" (acoustic version)

== Reception ==
- "one of the few seriously innovative bands in the Lawrence-Kansas City-Topeka area" (Blake Gumprecht; University Daily Kansan; Dec 15, 1980)
- "original, simple, clean material and an energized, tight performance" (Karen Barber; KLZR 106; June 20, 1981)
- "their music has a beat and a fundamentally aggressive quality that is extremely satisfying" (John Korst; Jet Lag; Feb 1983)
- "This is what happened to Midwestern bar bands when they heard the Sex Pistols. Lots of beat and jangle; it's raw and rocking" (Barbara Nellis; Playboy; March 1985)
- "the band has a truly impressive knack for three-piece writing and arranging. Their new LP, Swimming With Sharks, is full of tense, carefully crafted miniatures that meld unvarnished noise with unexpected pretty vocal harmonies" (Renaldo Migaldi; Chicago Reader; 1986)
- "Dense minimalist rock featuring choppy guitars, a tight rhythmic thrust, and passionate, often eerie vocals, with stream-of-consciousness lyrics" (Jeff Silberman; Rock It; Fall 1986)
- "Get Smart! has emerged as one of Chicago's most respected (and nationally renowned) underground bands" (Moira McCormick; Illinois Entertainer; September 1986)
- "Warm pop melodicism competes with punky bluntness and jagged noise tendencies" (Ira Robbins; Trouser Press; 1986)
- Swimming With Sharks blends "aggressive dance-punk a la Gang of Four and Pylon with classique-moderne action reminiscent of X and The Embarrassment" (Joseph Neff, The Vinyl District, Oct 5, 2021)
