= The Pitch (newspaper) =

Alternative newspaper distributed in the Kansas City Metropolitan Area

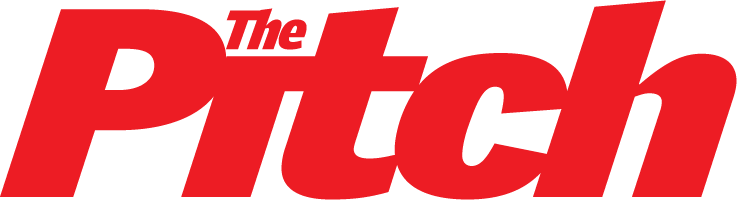
- Type: Alternative weekly
- Format: Tabloid
- Owner: Carey Media
- Publisher: Stephanie Carey
- Editor: Brock Wilbur
- Founded: 1980
- Language: English
- Headquarters: 1627 Main St. Kansas City, Missouri 64108, USA
- Circulation: 45,000 (as of January 2011)
- Price: Free
- OCLC number: 820204079
- Website: thepitchkc.com

The Pitch is a free alternative newspaper distributed in the Kansas City Metropolitan Area, including Lawrence and Topeka, Kansas. While known for its investigative stories of the local government, it also covers local sports stories, restaurants, events, visual art, and concerts. It was started in July 1980 as the Penny Pitch, which was a monthly handout at Penny Lane Record Shop in the Westport area of Kansas City. The original editors were Dwight Frizzell and Jay Mandeville.

Village Voice Media bought The Pitch in 1999, and sold the paper in 2011 to SouthComm Communications. In 2017 The Pitch was sold to Stephanie Carey and Adam Carey.

The Pitch is a member of the Association of Alternative Newsweeklies.

Unusually for a weekly, The Pitch has commissioned overseas reporting, sending a freelancer to Poznań in 2024 to write about rail transit on the eve of the KC Streetcar expansion toward the University of Missouri Kansas City.

== Staff ==
- Editor - Brock Wilbur
- Publisher - Stephanie Carey
