= KJHK =

Campus radio station at the University of Kansas in Lawrence, Kansas

- Lawrence, Kansas; United States
- Broadcast area: Northeast Kansas
- Frequency: 90.7 MHz

Programming
- Format: College radio

Ownership
- Owner: The University of Kansas

History
- Founded: 1952
- First air date: October 15, 1975
- Call sign meaning: Kansas Jayhawk

Technical information
- Licensing authority: FCC
- Facility ID: 66587
- Class: A
- ERP: 2,500 watts
- HAAT: 85 meters (279 ft)

Links
- Public license information: Public file; LMS
- Webcast: Listen live
- Website: kjhk.org/web/

KJHK (90.7 FM) is a campus radio station, located in Lawrence, Kansas at the University of Kansas. On December 3, 1994, the station became one of the first radio stations in the world to broadcast a live and continuous stream over internet radio. It currently broadcasts at 2600 watts, with a broadcast area covering most of northeast Kansas. The station is overseen by the Kansas Memorial Unions but is completely run by University of Kansas students. The station airs local music, classical music, classic country, jazz, specialty talk shows, world music, and variety shows, and airs home football, basketball, and baseball games.

== History ==
=== 1950s-1970s ===
KJHK's roots go back to 1952, when KDGU signed on as a carrier current station on 630 AM. In 1956, it changed its calls to KUOK. Wilt Chamberlain hosted his own show on the station during his days as a KU student.

By the 1990s, the popularity of the station was outgrowing its limited range and on October 5, 1975, the Federal Communications Commission (FCC) gave final permission to broadcast at 90.7 megahertz, and granted the station the new call letters "KJHK". On October 15, 1975, Steve Doocy, now a conservative political commentator and host of Fox & Friends, played the first song at 12:25 P.M., broadcasting at 9.9 watts. In 1978 a bored staffer wrote a fake news report claiming a nuclear reactor explosion destroyed Waterloo, Iowa killing 15,000 people. Another staffer found the report and read it on air. The news was picked up by other organizations causing panic and was mentioned that night on the CBS Evening News by Walter Cronkite on how a single radio station "blowed up" Waterloo. The writer of the story was suspended for one semester before being promoted to news director the next fall.

=== 1980s ===
In 1987, KJHK was granted a power increase to 100 watts. In 1988 the FCC fined the station after an excited DJ said "Fuck you Billy Tubbs!" multiple times after the KU men's basketball title game against Oklahoma. This led the school administration to remove music with expletives. The administration also prevented Ku Klux Klan members to come on the air for a show on race citing security issues. Angry students protested what they saw as a censoring of free speech with some going as far as to make anonymous death threats.

In 1999, responding to pressure to gain a firmer hand on the day-to-day operations of the station in lieu of a gathering storm of controversies (about swearing over the air and because of the KKK incident to appear on air spun by a journalism news staffer), the journalism faculty took possession of the student built and student run music programming of the station that had gained nationwide notice in the alternative media, and a determined group of KJHK staff (current and former) - - - angered about the destruction of their notable legacy (the station was re-branded “J-Rock 91”) rose up in anger, and during much of 1988 and the first half of 1989 in a series of protests, benefit concerts, and full-page advertisements in the University Daily Kansan telling their side of the story and exposing an overzealous effort to expel the past, successfully forced the journalism faculty to reinstitute the Sound Alternative and the backward K on this pioneering college station's logo and compromised with the faculty in its demand to end the uncontrollable “wide open rock-n-roll prairie” era, of the station, formatting the music programming but mandating that students (not faculty) adopt the alternative formats of their choice. A policy and philosophy that remains in effect today, ensuring the creative progressive legacy that KJHK was founded on and excelled in rather than of the drab commercial sameness found across the rest of the dial. It was a rare victory for student protest anywhere in this world, but not unexpected by rebellious KJHK staff, who were raised on the creative gumption that KJHK.

=== 1990s ===
On December 3, 1999, the station became one of the first in the nation to broadcast a live, 24-hour signal on the internet. In 1995 KJHK changed its tagline from "The Sound Alternative", which it started using in 1976, to "The Hawk", because of alternative's association with top 40 music. In 2000, it reverted to "The Sound Alternative". The station increased its signal to 2600 watts in 1998.

=== 2000s ===
In 2003, after 28 years of supervision, the William Allen White School of Journalism decided that it could no longer support the station's operational budget. However, KU Memorial Unions agreed to take up oversight of the station. KJHK today is funded in-part by the KU Student Senate Media Fee as well as through donations by local businesses and private individuals. In 2005 KJHK celebrated its 30th anniversary by bringing a diverse group of artists to Lawrence such as Mates of State, LCD Soundsystem and Chuck D of Public Enemy.

=== KJHK today ===
The station currently has over 150 student volunteers, and continues with independent music as its charter and format. KJHK has two stipended staffs, Multimedia and Arts & Culture, and seven volunteer staffs. These current staffs are content staff, music staff, creative staff, street team, sports, and technology team. On May 5, 2010, KJHK moved from its longtime home, "The Shack", to newly constructed studios in the Kansas Union. The studios were renovated in January 2017.

The sports staff at KJHK now broadcasts the Jayhawk's football, men's and women's basketball, soccer, volleyball, and softball games over the air on 90.7FM. Coverage continues into the postseason for some of the teams, as KJHK broadcasts the men's March Madness Tournament, men's and women's Big 12 Conference Tournaments, and even the NCAA Volleyball Tournament when it was held in Lawrence after the 2023 season.

== Awards and achievements ==
- KJHK students have been annually recognized with several awards for its technical and creative merits from the Kansas Association of Broadcasters.
- Winner of CMJ's 2006 "Most Improved Station."
- Nominated for the 2007 PLUG Award for "Best College/Non-Commercial Radio Station Of The Year."
- On June 8, 2007, KJHK was reportedly the first Kansas radio station to produce a live remote radio broadcast using the Broadcast Reliable Internet Codec. The station transmitted broadcast-quality audio over a Wi-Fi network at Clinton Lake State Park during the 2007 Wakarusa Music and Camping Festival.
- This was the first confirmed station to play the band Flight of the Conchords on July 17.
- KJHK was recently designated the 15th best college radio station in the country, according to the Princeton Review.
- Awarded the "Abraham & Borst Award - Best Overall Station" at the 2023 Intercollegiate Broadcast System (IBS) conference.

== See also ==
- Campus radio
- List of college radio stations in the United States
