= Jerrod Niemann discography =

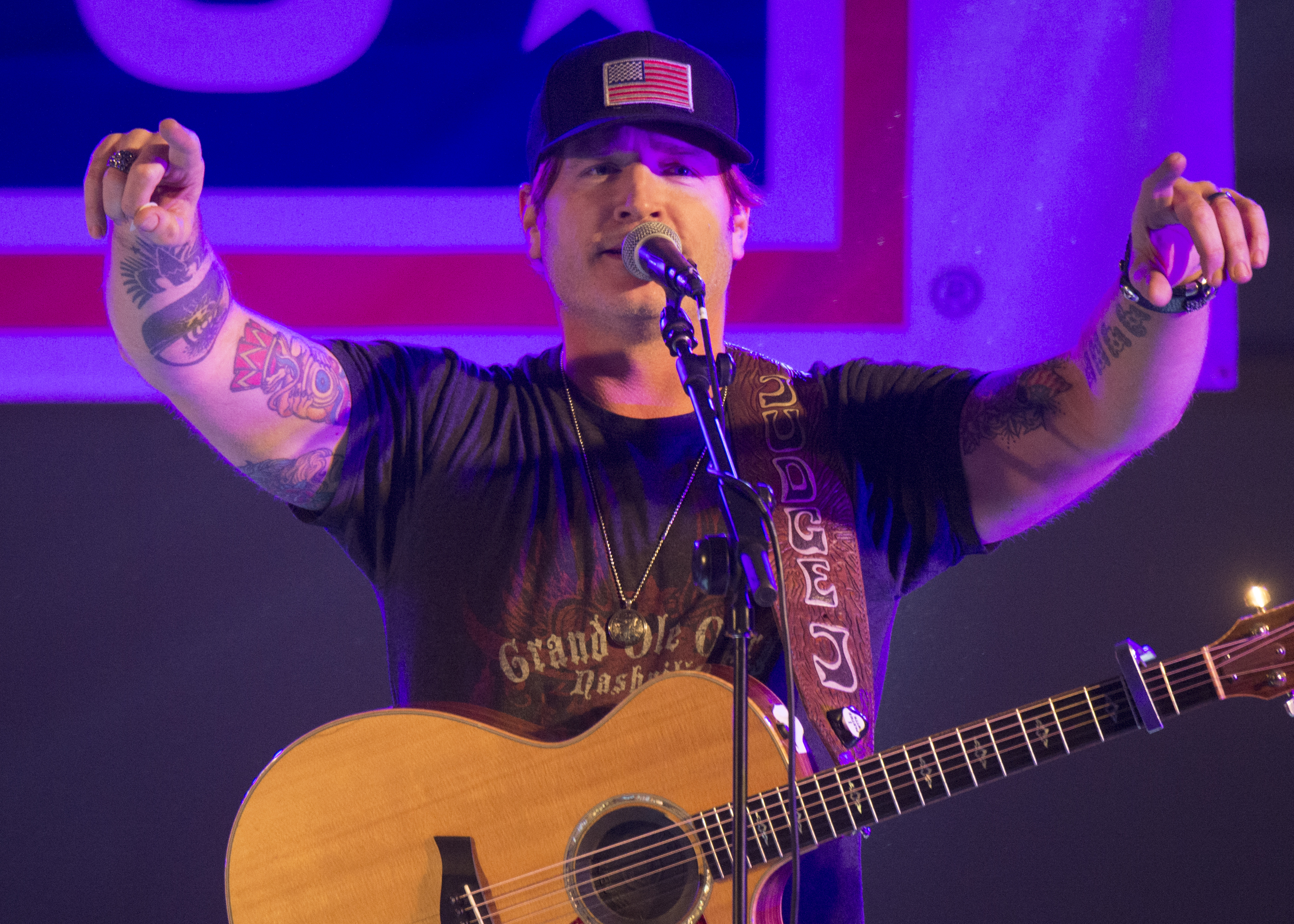
- Niemann performing at Morón Air Base in Spain
- Studio albums: 6
- Singles: 16
- Music videos: 11
- #1 singles: 2

American country music singer Jerrod Niemann has released six studio albums and sixteen singles. After independently releasing Long Hard Road and Jukebox of Hard Knocks independently, he signed with Category 5 Records and then with Arista Nashville. His most commercially successful release through Arista Nashville was Judge Jerrod & the Hung Jury, which reached number one on Top Country Albums and produced the single "Lover, Lover", a number one single on Hot Country Songs. Niemann also reached number one on the chart with "Drink to That All Night".

== Studio albums ==
Title	Album details	Peak chart positions		Sales
Title	Album details	US Country	US	Sales
Long Hard Road	Release date: October 22, 1999; Label: self-released	—	—	
Jukebox of Hard Knocks	Release date: October 15, 2004; Label: self-released	—	—	
Judge Jerrod & the Hung Jury	Release date: July 13, 2010; Label: Sea Gayle/Arista Nashville	1	7	US: 328,000
Free the Music	Release date: October 2, 2012; Label: Sea Gayle/Arista Nashville	9	62	US: 11,000
High Noon	Release date: March 25, 2014; Label: Sea Gayle/Arista Nashville	3	18	US: 60,000
This Ride	Release date: October 6, 2017; Label: Curb	— (Note: This Ride did not chart on Top Country Albums, but peaked at No. 28 on the Country Album Sales chart.)	—	US: 1,700
"—" denotes releases that did not chart

== Singles ==
Year	Single	Peak chart positions					Certifications (sales threshold)	Album
Year	Single	US Country	US Country Airplay	US	CAN Country	CAN	Certifications (sales threshold)	Album
2007	"I Love Women (My Momma Can't Stand)"	59		—	—	—		Behind This Microphone (unreleased)
2007	"The One That Got Away"	—		—	—	—		Behind This Microphone (unreleased)
2010	"Lover, Lover"	1		29	2	49	RIAA: Platinum	Judge Jerrod & the Hung Jury
2010	"What Do You Want"	4		52	28	—	RIAA: Gold	Judge Jerrod & the Hung Jury
2011	"One More Drinkin' Song" (Note: "One More Drinkin' Song" peaked at No. 60 on Country Airplay in 2010 before it was released as a single in 2011.)	13		72	26	—		Judge Jerrod & the Hung Jury
2012	"Shinin' on Me"	17	17	92	50	—		Free the Music
2012	"Only God Could Love You More"	38	29	—	—	—		Free the Music
2013	"Drink to That All Night"	4	1	34	1	33	RIAA: Platinum	High Noon
2014	"Donkey"	38	43	—	—	—		High Noon
2014	"Buzz Back Girl"	—	35	—	—	—		High Noon
2015	"Blue Bandana"	37	32	—	—	—		—N/a
2016	"A Little More Love" (with Lee Brice)	41	28	—	—	—		This Ride
2017	"God Made a Woman"	—	55	—	—	—		This Ride
2017	"I Got This"	—	37	—	—	—		This Ride
2020	"Ghost Rider"	—	—	—	—	—		—N/a
2020	"Tequila Kisses"	—	—	—	—	—		—N/a
"—" denotes releases that did not chart

== Other singles ==
=== Christmas songs ===
Year	Single	Peak chart positions
Year	Single	US Country Airplay
2014	"A Holly Jolly Christmas"	53

== Music videos ==
Year	Video	Director	Producer
2010	"Lover, Lover"	Potsy Ponciroli	
2010	"What Do You Want"	Chris Hicky	
2011	"One More Drinkin' Song"	Brian Lazzaro	
2012	"Shinin' on Me"	Chris Hicky	
2013	"Only God Could Love You More"	Eric Welch	
2014	"Drink to That All Night"	Eric Welch	
2014	"Drink to That All Night" (featuring Pitbull)	Eric Welch	
2014	"Buzz Back Girl"	Eric Welch	
2015	"Blue Bandana"	P. R. Brown	
2016	"A Little More Love" (with Lee Brice)	Chase Lauer	
2017	"God Made A Woman"	Ryan Hamblin	Joel Hartz
