= Erik Scott =

American bass guitarist, producer and songwriter (1948–2019)

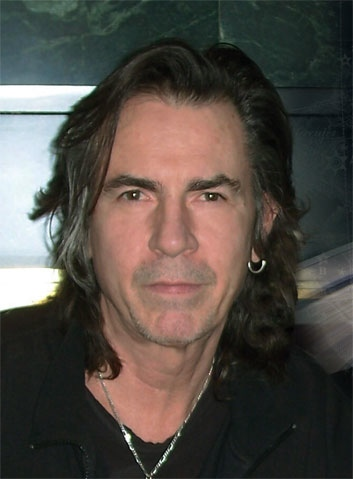

Background information
- Born: January 17, 1948; Milwaukee, Wisconsin, U.S.
- Died: October 19, 2019 (aged 71)
- Genres: Rock; new-age
- Occupations: Bassist; record producer
- Instruments: Bass guitar; keyboards; vocals
- Years active: 1969–2019
- Formerly of: Sonia Dada
- Website: Official website

Erik Scott (January 17, 1948 – October 11, 2019) was an American bassist, record producer, and songwriter. Scott played bass for the band Flo & Eddie in the 1970s as well as Alice Cooper in the early 1980s, for whom he also produced. In the 1990s he was one of the founding members of Sonia Dada, which reached the number one position on the Australian music charts with their eponymous debut studio album. Scott was also the co-writer of the song "Father, Father", which was the title track for the Pops Staples' album of the same name, winner of the 1994 Grammy Award for Best Contemporary Blues Album. In 2008 he became a solo artist as well, with his debut studio album Other Planets. He recorded four solo studio albums in total, including the 2016 ZMR Awards Album of the Year winner In the Company of Clouds.

== Early career ==
Erik Scott played his first instrument in the fourth grade. As a professional he was first recorded as a bassist on the albums of bands as far back as 1969 with the bands Food and Jambalaya. Then in 1974 he was the bassist on Flo & Eddie's comedy rock live album Illegal, Immoral and Fattening as well as their 1976 follow-up studio album Moving Targets. Scott also toured with the band from 1974 onwards. According to Scott, it was Flo & Eddie that gave him his enduring industry nickname "Eski". In 1978 Scott became the bassist for Tonio K on his solo studio album Life in the Foodchain, and in 1980 on Franne Golde's final studio album, Restless. In 1980, Scott was co-producer on Peter McIan's studio album Playing Near the Edge, which was voted one of Cashbox's top ten albums of the year, and teamed up with Carl Palmer and John Nitzinger in the group PM as bassist for their sole studio album. They appeared on the German TV show Rockpop performing the single "Dynamite". Scott was a producer on Sharon O'Neill's 1981 studio album Maybe, which reached number 38 on the Australian music charts. During this period Scott also wrote and recorded music for the television shows Starsky & Hutch, Charlie's Angels, Vegas, and The Love Boat.

== Alice Cooper ==
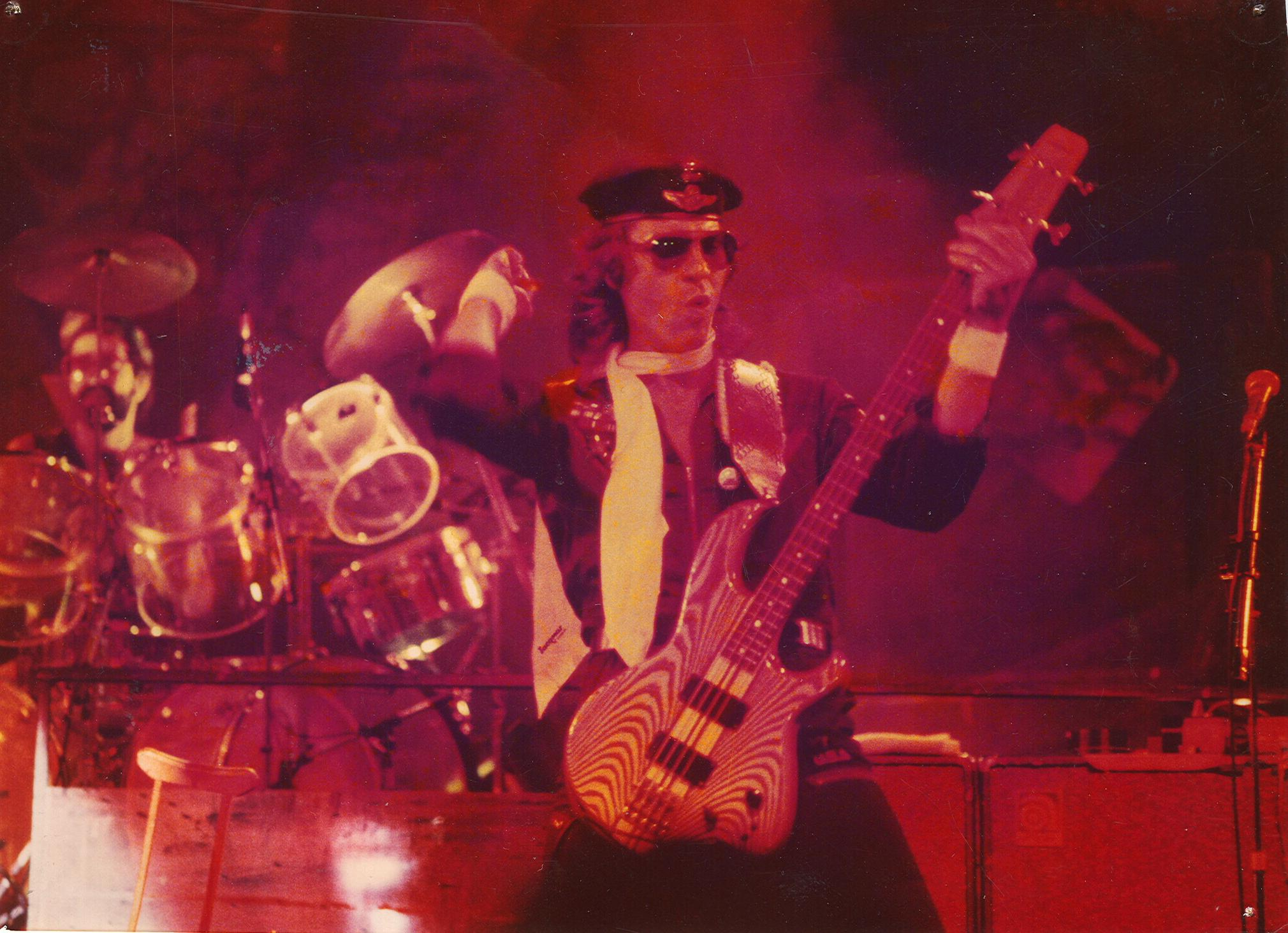
Scott performing during Alice Cooper's Special Forces tour in 1981

Scott's work with Alice Cooper began in 1980, when he was hired as the bassist for the band's Flush the Fashion world tour. By 1981 Scott had become the band leader for Alice Cooper, as well as a writer on songs for Cooper's next studio album Special Forces. Scott would continue writing and playing bass for Cooper through 1982, including on the studio album Zipper Catches Skin, which Scott co-produced, and performing in the TV special Alice Cooper a Paris. Scott would later be credited as a producer on Cooper's 1989 compilation album Prince of Darkness. Scott would work further with Cooper on three compilation albums in the late 1990s and early 2000s, including The Life and Crimes of Alice Cooper in 1999 as a composer, and as producer on The Definitive Alice Cooper and Mascara & Monsters: The Best of Alice Cooper in 2001.

== Sonia Dada ==
During this time he became an original member of the second band: Sonia Dada. Scott was a composer for and played bass on their eponymous debut studio album Sonia Dada, which reached the number one position on the ARIA charts, becoming the 13th highest selling album of 1993 in Australia. The single You Don't Treat Me No Good from the album lasted four weeks in the number one position on the Australian charts in 1992—replacing Whitney Houston's I Will Always Love You. At the same time, Sonia Dada's single You Aint Thinking (About Me) was also at number three on the Australian charts.

Scott was also bassist and composer on their second studio album A Day at the Beach (1995). Scott was quoted as saying at the time that, "It's a very natural connection between eight guys and that's unnatural." In 1998 Scott composed, produced, and played bass on their third studio album, My Secret Life, and their 1999 live album Lay Down and Love It Live. That year Scott was interviewed about the sound of the group and said, "The best description I've heard that really makes sense to me is that it's a collision of rock 'n' roll and R&B with a gospel seasoning." In 2002 Scott once again served as producer and played bass for their fourth studio album Barefootsoul, as well as for their 2004 studio album Test Pattern.

== Other Planets ==
In 2008 Scott released his debut solo studio album Other Planets. John Diliberto reviewed the album as the Echoes radio program CD of the month for February 2009, stating that, "It's an album that's more Pink Floyd than Jaco Pastorius. Scott isn't a frustrated electric guitarist. He's a composer as much as a bass player who dives into the deep soul and nuances of the bass, extracting sensuous melodies and atmospheric moods." Bass Musician magazine called it one of their favorite CDs of 2008.

=== Track listing ===
1. "Other Planets (Sundogs)"
2. "Proper Son"
3. "Bartalk"
4. "Peace on Saturn"
5. "Donnie and Sancho"
6. "Despues de Guerro"
7. "Bassque Revolution"
8. "Foggy Bridges"
9. "Bathing Maui"
10. "Aliens Made Me Do This"

== And the Earth Bleeds ==
In April 2014 Scott released his sophomore solo studio album, And the Earth Bleeds. On the album he both plays the instrumentals and sings vocals on several of the tracks. Lorraine Devon Wilke of The Huffington Post wrote of the album that, "Scott has conjured up a new version of his own artistry in and the EARTH BLEEDS, one that, particularly after repeated plays, becomes mesmerizing and hypnotic... a 'soulful and mystic brew.'" Bass Musician magazine said of the album that, "Erik has taken his enchanting and mystical music a step further with the release of ‘And The Earth Bleeds’." Many of the songs on the album were inspired by Scott's travels, especially his time spent in Scotland during 2013. The album mixes world music, jazz, and other influences. Music Street Journal wrote that the album is "progressive music that defies definition".

=== Track listing ===
1. "Gypsy Mother and the Royal Bastard"
2. "Free"
3. "And the Earth Bleeds"
4. "Weightless"
5. "Loco Amour (I Could Be Crazy)"
6. "The Battle for Neverland"
7. "Let's Do Something Cool"
8. "Run"
9. "The White Mouse"

== Spirits ==
In 2014 Scott released Spirits, a remix album featuring tracks from his first two solo studio albums. In December 2014 it ranked Number One on the Zone Music Reporter's Top 100 Radio Airplay chart. New Age Music Reviews said of the album that, "I think diversity is the key to success in area of employment and never is it more evident than with Scott’s music ... Scott’s bass is quite prolific throughout this recording; his prominence and importance to the overall presentation reminded me of the dominance of a Jaco Pastorius or Tony Levin. It is like the purity of a hot springs bubbling essence and the synchronicity of time meeting for a grand explosion of colors and sounds. It’s both beauty and wonder put together in one tightly wrapped package."

=== Track listing ===
1. "Peace on Saturn"
2. "Other Planets (Sundogs)"
3. "Free"
4. "Donnie and Sancho"
5. "Weightless"
6. "Run"
7. "Foggy Bridges"
8. "Yesterday"
9. "Proper Son"
10. "The Battle for Neverland"
11. "The White Mouse"
12. "And the Earth Bleeds"
13. "Gypsy Mother and the Royal Bastard"

== In the Company of Clouds ==
Scott's fourth solo studio album received the Album of the Year award and Best Contemporary Instrumental Album award from the 2016 ZMR Music Awards. It was also number one on ZMR airplay at the end of that year. Scott's bass is featured on each track as the central instrument, often including his vocals as well. John Pirruccello plays accompaniment on his steel guitar on many tracks, and the album also features several other accompanying artists. The album was inspired by Scott's diagnosis and treatment for esophageal cancer, leading to remission, and the spiritual questions he wrestled with during this time. John Diliberto wrote of the work that Scott is "a bassist who takes leads, playing vocal melody lines that perfectly suit his fretless bass style ... He brings the music into his melodic space, surrounding it with lush, but understated synthesizers and working under the canopy of Pirruccello’s pedal steel."

=== Track listing ===
1. "Nine Lives"
2. "Seven Veils"
3. "Women of Avalon"
4. "Breathing Room"
5. "Victory"
6. "Open Door"
7. "First Cup"
8. "Waves"
9. "The Long View"

== Other work ==
From 1979 to 1980 he provided bass guitar and vocals for Carl Palmer-led band PM on their sole studio album 1:PM (1980). Scott's other work in the 1980s included recording as the bassist and a producer on the band Idle Tears' self-titled studio album Idle Tears (1986). He was also the co-writer of the Ted Nugent song "When Your Body Talks" on his 1986 studio album Little Miss Dangerous. In 1987 Scott was a songwriter for the Triumph studio album Surveillance, which reached gold record status in Canada. In 1989 Scott was composer and bassist on the Signal's studio album Loud & Clear as well. As a bassist he recorded on Kim Carnes' 1993 compilation album Gypsy Honeymoon: The Best of Kim Carnes, and Pops Staples' 1994 studio album Father, Father, for which he co-wrote the title track. Father, Father won the 1994 Grammy Award for Best Contemporary Blues Album. In 2004 Scott then played bass on Staples' daughter Mavis Staples' studio album Have a Little Faith.

In the film industry, Scott has provided music for the motion pictures Waterproof (2000) starring Burt Reynolds, Nothing to Lose (1997), and National Lampoon's Vacation (1983) as well as its sequels.

== Death ==
Scott died on October 11, 2019, after battling various forms of cancer for years.

== Discography ==
Year	Title	Artist/Group	Role(s)
1969	Forever is a Dream	FOOD	Bass
1973	High Rollers	Jambalaya	Bass, Composer
1974	Mo	Mo McGuire	Bass
1975	Illegal, Immoral and Fattening	Flo & Eddie	Bass
1976	Moving Targets	Flo & Eddie	Bass
1976	Tozasareta-Machi	Carmen Maki & Oz	Arranger, Producer
1977	Blue Sailor	Cheryl Dilcher	Bass
1978	Life in the Foodchain	Tonio K	Bass
1978	Moonlight Serenade/Rainy Night In Rio	Tuxedo Junction	Bass
1979	Gershwin '79	Westside Station	Bass
1979	Bernadette	J.T. Connection	Bass
1980	Playing Near The Edge	Peter McIan	Bass, Producer
1980	Restless	Franne Golde	Bass
1980	1:PM	Carl Palmer	Bass, Vocals
1981	Maybe	Sharon O'Neill	Bass, Producer
1981	Special Forces	Alice Cooper	Bass, Songwriter
1981	For Britain Only	Alice Cooper	Bass, Composer, Producer
1982	Zipper Catches Skin	Alice Cooper	Arranger, Bass, Composer, Mixing, Producer, Songwriter
1985	Code Of Honor	Mark Edwards	Bass
1985	Barking At Airplanes	Kim Carnes	Bass
1986	Two Divided Hearts	Kim Carnes	Bass
1986	Little Miss Dangerous	Ted Nugent	Composer, Lyricist
1986	Idle Tears	Idle Tears	Bass, Producer
1987	The Best Of Flo & Eddie	Flo & Eddie	Bass
1988	Prince of Darkness	Alice Cooper	Producer
1989	Surveillance	Triumph	Songwriter
1989	Loud & Clear	Signal	Arranger, Bass, Composer, Keyboards
1992	Sonia Dada	Sonia Dada	Bass, Composer
1993	Gypsy Honeymoon: Best of Kim Carnes	Kim Carnes	Bass
1994	Father Father	Roebuck "Pops" Staples	Bass, Composer
1995	A Day at the Beach	Sonia Dada	Bass, Composer
1998	My Secret Life	Sonia Dada	Bass, Composer, Producer
1999	The Life & Crimes of Alice Cooper	Alice Cooper	Bass, Composer, Producer
1999	Lay Down & Love It Live	Sonia Dada	Bass, Composer, Producer
2002	...Barefootsoul...	Sonia Dada	Bass, Composer, Producer
2004	Test Pattern	Sonia Dada	Bass, Composer, Producer
2004	Have a Little Faith	Mavis Staples	Bass
2006	Peace to the Neighborhood/Father Father	Roebuck "Pops" Staples	Bass, Songwriter
2008	Other Planets	Erik Scott	Bass, Bass Effect Treatment, Composer, Drum Programming, Drums (Bass), Engineer, Kazoo, Keyboards, Mixing, Percussion, Percussion Programming, Producer, Synthesizer, Vocals
2011	Johnny Boy Would Love This...A Tribute To John Martyn	Various	Bass
2011	Black Robes and Lawyers	William Michael Dillon	Bass
2012	Still Standing	Shawn Christopher	Bass
2014	And The Earth Bleeds	Erik Scott	Bass, Various Misc. Instruments, Vocals
2014	Spirits	Erik Scott	Bass, Composer, Drum Programming, Effects, Engineer, Guitar (Baritone), Keyboards, Mixing, Percussion Programming, Producer
2016	In The Company of Clouds	Erik Scott	Bass, Composer, Drums, Engineer, Keyboards, Mandolin, Mixing, Percussion Programming, Producer, Vocals
2018	A Trick of the Wind	Erik Scott	Bass, Composer, Engineer, Keyboards, Mixing, Producer, Vocals (including fretless bass, fretted bass, eBow bass, electric piano, organ, synthesizer, electric sitar, percussion programs, and bass-generated fx)

== Personal life ==
Erik was Allstate Champ Basketball Illinois which produced his scholarship to graduate Cum Laude with a Business Degree. Erik Eski Scott was married to Janice Mickie Scott until his death. They met during an Alice Cooper tour and were married for 38 years. Mickie managed known recording studios in LA and Chicago. She is also a musician, a dancer and Equestrian. Her companies include Mrs Mix Music and Rodent Rock Productions in California including making music videos. (See IMDb Pro, Google, Flickr, LinkedIn, Radio Memphis).
