= I Don't Dance =

I Don't Dance may refer to:

- "I Don't Dance" (High School Musical song), from High School Musical 2
- "I Don't Dance" by Birds in Row from We Already Lost the World
- "I Don't Dance" by DMX from Undisputed
- I Don't Dance (album), by Lee Brice
  - "I Don't Dance" (Lee Brice song), its title track
- "I Don't Dance (Without You)", a song by Matoma and Enrique Iglesias

== See also ==
- "I Won't Dance", a jazz standard song
