= E.C. Scott =

American musician and television host (born 1951)

- Born: Ecrettia Peevy or Jacobs; September 14, 1951 (age 74); Oakland, California, United States
- Genres: Electric blues, soul blues, gospel, soul
- Occupations: Singer, songwriter, record producer, television host
- Years active: 1980s–present
- Labels: Blind Pig, Black Bud

E.C. Scott (born September 14, 1951 or late 1950s) is an American electric blues, soul blues, gospel and soul singer, songwriter, record producer and television host. Jerry Wexler, called Scott "one honest-to-God soul singer." She has been nominated for nine Blues Music Awards, and has shared the stage with Ray Charles, Patti LaBelle, Lou Rawls, John Lee Hooker, and the Ohio Players.

== Life and career ==
Most sources give her birth name as Ecrettia Jacobs, born in Oakland, California, in the late 1950s, but researchers Bob Eagle and Eric LeBlanc suggest that she was born Ecrettia Peevy in 1951. She attended the Skyline High School in Oakland and is listed in the 'Class of 1970'.

In her childhood she saw gospel singers such as Shirley Caesar and Inez Andrews. She also sang at the local St. John Missionary Baptist Church. She later turned her attention to soul music after listening to her sisters' radio. Scott began singing in nightclubs at the age of 16, and she was performing professionally two years later. Marriage and raising three children led Scott to put her music career to one side, before resurrecting it when her children grew older. Initially performing jazz, she reverted to blues and R&B once her backing band, named Smoke, were in place. She performed around San Francisco, including a spell as the house band at a nightclub called Slim's.

Scott released her debut single in 1988 and built up a local fan base. She appeared at a number of blues festivals, and performed at Grand Openings for the San Francisco Symphony, the San Francisco Ballet, and the San Francisco Opera, before signing a recording contract with Blind Pig Records in 1994.

Her first album, Come Get Your Love was released in 1995. Living Blues noted that "E.C. Scott must be ranked among the best of the promising female blues singers in recent years." Hard Act to Follow duly followed in 1998. Scott received a nomination for a Blues Music Award in 1999 for 'Soul Blues Female Artist of the Year'. Scott performed at both the San Francisco Blues Festival, and Briggs Farm Blues Festival in 1999, and the Sarasota Blues Fest in 2000. Masterpiece, her final recording with Blind Pig, was issued in 2000.

Her self-released album, The Other Side of Me (2003), included more of her self-penned numbers, and had a guest vocal appearance by Little Milton on two of the tracks, "Just One of Those Days" and "If I Can Borrow Some of Your Love". In Lincoln, Nebraska, she had filmed a video for "These Ain't Yo Daddy's Kind of Blues," another track from The Other Side of Me. However, Scott discovered that, without a single blues video television program in the United States, she was left with only her own website and YouTube to air the promotional tool. In November 2006, performing as a television host, she presented the first show of the American public access television program, EC's Jook Joint, which reaches eight million households through around 350 broadcast stations nationwide. The program features videos of blues performances, with introductions and editing work by Scott.

Through her own company, ECS Productions, Scott also began working as an artist manager for a number of acts typically performing blues, pop or gospel material. In addition, she has operated as a video producer for acts including Ronnie Baker Brooks.

In 2009, she toured Europe and regularly appears at Biscuits & Blues in San Francisco. In 2011, she performed at the Riverfront Blues Festival.

She currently lives in Union City, California, in a house which incorporates her home studio for editing EC's Jook Joint.

== Songwriting ==
Her songs have been recorded by various other artists including Sonia Dada ("Sail Away" on A Day at the Beach), Worl-A-Girl ("Why You So Cruel", "Party", and "Stylee" on Party), Stephanie Nakasian ("Someone's Rocking My Dreamboat" on Invitation to an Escapade), Juelz Santana ("Gone" on What the Game's Been Missing!), The Diplomats ("The Pit" on More Than Music, Vol. 1), and Kenny Vance ("Diamonds and Pearls" on Lovers Island).

== Discography ==
=== Albums ===
Year	Title	Record label
1995	Come Get Your Love	Blind Pig Records
1998	Hard Act to Follow	Blind Pig Records
2000	Masterpiece	Blind Pig Records
2003	The Other Side of Me	Black Bud Records
