= Blue Bandana =

Single by Jerrod Niemann
- Released: July 10, 2015
- Recorded: 2015
- Genre: Country
- Length: 3:24
- Label: Sea Gayle; Arista Nashville
- Songwriter(s): Ben Goldsmith; C.J. Solar; Andrew Scott Wills
- Producer(s): Jerrod Niemann; Jimmie Lee Sloas

Jerrod Niemann singles chronology
| "Buzz Back Girl" (2014) | "Blue Bandana" (2015) | "A Little More Love" (2016) |

"Blue Bandana" is a song recorded by American country music artist Jerrod Niemann. It was released in July 2015. The song was written by Ben Goldsmith, C.J. Solar and Andrew Scott Wills.

== Critical reception ==
Billy Dukes of Taste of Country gave the song a positive review, saying that "Jerrod Niemann sings of a free spirit in his new song “Blue Bandana,” but she’s something of a metaphor for lost youth. The girl in the blue bandana is a gypsy committed only to the wispy impulses of the wind. By the end of the song she’s slipped away.

== Music video ==
The music video was directed by P. R. Brown and premiered in August 2015.

== Chart performance ==
| Chart (2015) | Peak position |
|---|---|
| US Country Airplay (Billboard) | 32 |
| US Hot Country Songs (Billboard) | 37 |
