= Test Pattern =

A test pattern, or test card, is a television test signal.

Test Pattern may refer to:

- Test Pattern (TV series), a Canadian game show
- Test Pattern (album), an album by Sonia Dada
- Test Pattern (film), a 2019 film written and directed by Shatara Michelle Ford
