= One More Drinkin' Song =

Single by Jerrod Niemann

from the album Judge Jerrod & the Hung Jury
- Released: June 6, 2011
- Recorded: 2009–10
- Genre: Country
- Length: 2:47
- Label: Sea Gayle; Arista Nashville
- Songwriters: Jerrod Niemann; Richie Brown
- Producers: Jerrod Niemann; Dave Brainard

Jerrod Niemann singles chronology
"What Do You Want" (2010)	"One More Drinkin' Song" (2011)	"Shinin' on Me" (2012)

"One More Drinkin' Song" is a song co-written and recorded by American country music artist Jerrod Niemann. It was released in June 2011 as the third single from his album Judge Jerrod & the Hung Jury. Niemann wrote this song with Richie Brown.

The song received mixed reviews from critics who felt that it lacked creativity to distinguish itself from other similar songs. "One More Drinkin' Song" peaked at number 13 on the Billboard Hot Country Songs chart and number 72 on the Hot 100.

== History ==
Niemann first promoted the song in 2009 shortly before his signing with Arista Nashville. He told Billboard that he wrote the song in response to a comment from a member of his publishing company, who criticized him for recording too many songs with party themes.

== Critical reception ==
Billy Dukes of Taste of Country gave the song four stars out of five. Although he did not think that it had the "artistic depth" of Niemann's previous singles, he also called it "Niemann's best chance to establish himself as a hitmaker." It also received a positive review from Matt Bjorke of Roughstock, who compared it favorably to "Two Piña Coladas" by Garth Brooks. C.M. Wilcox of The 9513, who reviewed the song in late 2009, gave it a "thumbs down" because he thought that the song lacked anything distinctive. Kevin John Coyne, reviewing the song for Country Universe, gave it a B− rating, calling it "part George Strait, part Garth Brooks, part Niemann." He goes on to say that it feels like a lack of creativity.

== Chart performance ==
The song first entered the Hot Country Songs charts at number 60 for the week ending January 16, 2010. It fell out after only one week, and Niemann's official Arista Nashville debut, "Lover, Lover", was released. "One More Drinkin' Song" re-entered at number 58 on the chart dated for the week ending June 11, 2011.

Chart (2011)	Peak position
US Hot Country Songs (Billboard)	13
US Billboard Hot 100	72

=== Year-end charts ===
Chart (2011)	Position
US Country Songs (Billboard)	48
