= Lay Down and Love It Live =

Live album by Sonia Dada
- Released: October 12, 1999
- Genre: Rock; Soul
- Label: Calliope Records

Sonia Dada chronology
My Secret Life (1998)	Lay Down and Love It Live (1999)	Barefootsoul (2002)

Lay Down and Love It Live is the first (and currently only) live album by Sonia Dada. The album was released in 1999 on Calliope Records, and was re-issued in 2002 by Razor & Tie. The album includes a cover version of Sly & the Family Stone's "I Want to Take You Higher". It was recorded during live performances in California and Colorado in 1998.

== Track listing ==
1. Planes & Satellites
2. Lester's Methadone Clinic
3. I'm Gone
4. Never See Me Again
5. Amazing Jane
6. You Ain't Thinking (About Me)
7. Anna Lee
8. Last Parade (Crazy Lady)
9. Phases Of The Moon
10. Don't Go (Giving Your Love Away)
11. You Don't Treat Me No Good
12. I Want To Take You Higher
13. Goodnight
