= A Little More Love =

A Little More Love may refer to:

- "A Little More Love" (Jerrod Niemann and Lee Brice song), 2016
- "A Little More Love" (Lisa Stansfield song), 1992
- "A Little More Love" (Olivia Newton-John song), 1978
- "A Little More Love" (Vince Gill song), 1997

== See also ==
- "Little More Love", a 2021 song by AJ Tracey from the album Flu Game
