= This Ride =

Studio album by Jerrod Niemann
- Released: October 6, 2017
- Genre: Country
- Label: Curb
- Producer: Jerrod Niemann; Jimmie Lee Sloas; Lee Brice ("A Little More Love" only)

Jerrod Niemann chronology
High Noon (2014)	This Ride (2017)

Singles from This Ride
- 1. "A Little More Love" Released: April 29, 2016; 2. "God Made a Woman" Released: April 18, 2017; 3. "I Got This" Released: December 11, 2017

This Ride is the sixth album by American country music singer Jerrod Niemann. It is his first release for Curb Records, and it was issued on October 6, 2017. The album includes the single "A Little More Love", a duet with labelmate Lee Brice.

== Content ==
The album's first two singles, "A Little More Love" and "God Made a Woman", respectively charted at No. 28 and No. 55 on Country Airplay in advance of the album's release.

== Critical reception ==
Rating it 3.5 out of 5 stars, Stephen Thomas Erlewine of AllMusic wrote that "Maybe Niemann will never be as weird as he was on Free the Music, but on This Ride he manages to convey his own amiable, slightly left of center personality within mainstream country-pop, and that's more than enough." Markos Papadatos of Digital Journal rated the album "A", saying that "there is something in it for everybody" and praising "God Made a Woman" as the strongest song.

== Commercial performance ==
The album debuted at No. 28 on the Country Album Sales chart, selling 1,400 copies in the first week.

== Track listing ==
No.	Title	Writer(s)	Length
1.	"Zero to Crazy"	Chris DeStefano, Ashley Gorley, Shane McAnally	3:01
2.	"But I Do"	Jimmy Robbins, Jon Nite, Josh Osborne	3:44
3.	"Leavin' a Trail"	Corey Crowder, Luke Dick, Cole Taylor	3:28
4.	"I Got This"	Rodney Clawson, Dick, Taylor	3:01
5.	"Out of My Heart"	Dallas Davidson, DeStefano, Gorley	3:05
6.	"A Little More Love" (featuring Lee Brice)	Ross Copperman, Natalie Hemby, McAnally, Kristi Neumann	2:59
7.	"God Made a Woman"	Jeff Hyde, Michael Ray, Joel Shewmake	3:28
8.	"Whiskey Waitin' on Ice"	Jerrod Niemann, Lance Miller, Rob Hatch, Brandon Hood	3:38
9.	"Feelin'"	Dick, Chris Janson, Jeremy Stover	3:46
10.	"I Ain't All There" (featuring Diamond Rio)	Niemann, Miller, Richie Brown	3:19
11.	"Comeback"	Matt Dragstrem, Craig Wiseman, Jimmy Yeary	3:53
12.	"The Regulars"	Jessie Jo Dillon, Tina Parol, C.J. Solar	3:17
13.	"This Ride"	A.J. Babcock, Pete Good, J.T. Harding	4:00

== Personnel ==
- Lee Brice – duet vocals on "A Little More Love"
- Eric Darken – percussion
- Luke Dick – electric guitar
- David Dorn – keyboards
- Kenny Greenberg – e-bow, electric guitar, slide guitar
- Wes Hightower – background vocals
- Evan Hutchings – drums, keyboards, percussion, programming, synthesizer
- Gene Johnson – background vocals on "I Ain't All There"
- Charlie Judge – Hammond B-3 organ, keyboards, piano, synthesizer, strings, string arrangements
- Troy Lancaster – electric guitar
- Blair Masters – clavinet, keyboards, piano, programming, synthesizer, Wurlitzer
- Rob McNelley – acoustic guitar, electric guitar
- Lance Miller – background vocals
- Carl Miner – acoustic guitar
- Greg Morrow – drums
- Jerrod Niemann – lead vocals, background vocals
- Nick Norman – background vocals
- Jimmy Olander – electric guitar on "I Ain't All There"
- Russ Pahl – steel guitar
- Danny Rader – banjo, bouzouki, acoustic guitar, resonator guitar, mandolin
- Kip Raines – percussion
- Marty Roe – background vocals on "I Ain't All There"
- Justin Schipper – steel guitar
- Adam Shoenfeld – electric guitar
- Jimmie Lee Sloas – bass guitar, electric guitar, Hammond B-3 organ, ukulele
- Russell Terrell – background vocals
- Ilya Toshinsky – acoustic guitar
- Derek Wells – electric guitar
- Dana Williams – background vocals on "I Ain't All There"
- John Willis – acoustic guitar
- Nir "Z" Zidkyahu – drums, programming
