= Rumor (song) =

Single by Lee Brice

from the album Lee Brice
- Released: July 16, 2018
- Genre: Country
- Length: 3:18 (album version) 3:32 (Glover mix)
- Label: Curb
- Songwriters: Lee Brice; Ashley Gorley; Kyle Jacobs
- Producers: Lee Brice; Dan Frizsell; Kyle Jacobs; Jon Stone

Lee Brice singles chronology
"Boy" (2017)	"Rumor" (2018)	"I Hope You're Happy Now" (2019)

"Rumor" is a song by American country music singer Lee Brice. It was written by Brice, along with Ashley Gorley and Kyle Jacobs. It was released to radio on July 16, 2018, as the second single from Brice's self-titled studio album. The song was also remixed by producer Bryan Todd.

== Background ==
Brice wrote the song with Ashley Gorley and Kyle Jacobs. He said the song is a "natural throwback" to the small town he grew up in, where rumors travel quickly, be they true or false. The country song has been described as "blues-inflected ballad", and it is about a man and a woman who are so close together that people gossip about them, despite them not being in a relationship.

== Commercial performance ==
The song was released for sale on September 4, 2018, followed by a video release. It first entered Billboard's Country Airplay at number 59 and Hot Country Songs at number 44 on charts dated September 15, 2018. In July 2019, it became Brice's fifth number one single on the Country Airplay chart, and his first since "I Don't Dance" in August 2014. It was the highest-charting song of his career, peaking at number 25 on the Billboard Hot 100, until it was surpassed by "One of Them Girls", which peaked at number 17 the following year. The song was certified five-times Platinum by the RIAA on August 22, 2023. It has sold 280,000 copies in the United States as of September 2019. It was nominated for single of the year at the 55th Academy of Country Music Awards.

In 2020, "Rumor" was offered in two remixes on Curb Records's soundtrack to the Netflix original The Ranch, the Glover Mix and the Bryan Todd Mix.

== Music video ==
The music video for the song was released on September 5, 2018. It was directed by Ryan "Spidy" Smith and shot in Nashville. The video features Brice's wife Sara who plays the main love interest in the video.

Was featured in the Hallmark movie, My One and Only in 2019.

== Charts ==
=== Weekly charts ===
Original version

Chart (2018–2019)	Peak position
Canada Hot 100 (Billboard)	70
Canada Country (Billboard)	11
US Billboard Hot 100	25
US Adult Contemporary (Billboard)	18
US Country Airplay (Billboard)	1
US Hot Country Songs (Billboard)	2
US Rolling Stone Top 100	33

Glover mix

Chart (2020)	Peak position
US Country Airplay (Billboard)	48

=== Year-end charts ===
Chart (2019)	Position
US Billboard Hot 100	81
US Country Airplay (Billboard)	10
US Hot Country Songs (Billboard)	8
US Rolling Stone Top 100	93

== Certifications ==
Region	Certification	Certified units/sales
New Zealand (RMNZ)	Platinum	30,000^{‡}
United States (RIAA)	6× Platinum	6,000,000^{‡}
^{‡} Sales+streaming figures based on certification alone.
