= Drink to That All Night =

Single by Jerrod Niemann

from the album High Noon
- Released: October 21, 2013
- Recorded: 2013
- Genre: Country pop
- Length: 3:45
- Label: Sea Gayle; Arista Nashville
- Songwriters: Derek George; Lance Miller; Brad Warren; Brett Warren
- Producers: Jerrod Niemann; Jimmie Lee Sloas

Jerrod Niemann singles chronology
| "Only God Could Love You More" (2012) | "Drink to That All Night" (2013) | "Donkey" (2014) |

Alternative cover
- Cover for remix featuring Pitbull

Pitbull singles chronology
| "We Are One (Ole Ola)" (2014) | "Drink to That All Night (remix)" (2014) | "Good Time" (2014) |

"Drink to That All Night" is a song recorded by American country music artist Jerrod Niemann. It was released in October 2013 as the first single from his third studio album. The album, High Noon, was released on March 25, 2014. The song was written by Derek George, Lance Miller, and Brad and Brett Warren.

On May 19, 2014, a remix of the song, featuring Cuban-American rapper Pitbull, was released.

== Content ==
The song is an up-tempo party song in which the narrator says that he can "drink to that all night". The verses feature Auto-Tuned vocals from Niemann. It is in the key of A minor with a vocal range of G_{3}-E_{5}.

== Critical reception ==
"Drink to That All Night" received mixed reviews from critics. Billy Dukes of Taste of Country gave the song a positive review, writing that "the party anthem begins like a freight train barreling down some Blue Ridge mountaintop before introducing guitars, vocal effects and a final chorus that’s made for fist-pumping." Dukes also wrote that "the separate influences are deftly applied to – by the end – create a great turn-it-up moment of euphoria." Matt Bjorke of Roughstock gave the song four stars out of five, calling it "as unique, innovative and risky an artist can get." Bjorke said that the song "has a good natured, feel good vibe to it and quite honestly, it's the kind of song that makes for a fun part of a road trip playlist, a workout playlist, or – of course – a party playlist." Jon Freeman of Country Weekly was less positive, giving the song a "C" and criticizing the "monotone-rapping" of the verses and saying that the song was "surprisingly pedestrian", although he praised Niemann's singing on the chorus and said that the production "tastefully merges touches of electronic music with electric guitars without going off the deep end." Kevin John Coyne of Country Universe gave the song a "D" stating, "This has a tired theme coupled with the dreaded vocoder effect."

== Music video ==
The music video was directed by Eric Welch and premiered in February 2014.

== Commercial performance ==
"Drink to That All Night" debuted at number 59 on the U.S. Billboard Country Airplay chart for the week of October 12, 2013. It also debuted at number 37 on the U.S. Billboard Hot Country Songs chart for the week of November 9, 2013. It also debuted at number 90 on the U.S. Billboard Hot 100 chart for the week of January 18, 2014. It also debuted at number 91 on the Canadian Hot 100 chart for the week of January 25, 2014. "Drink to That All Night" reached number one on the Country Airplay chart dated April 26, 2014, becoming Niemann's second number one country hit (following "Lover, Lover" in August 2010). The song was certified gold by the RIAA on April 7, 2014. As of June 2014, the song has sold 826,000 copies in the US.

== Charts and certifications ==
=== Weekly charts ===
| Chart (2013–2014) | Peak position |
|---|---|
| Canada Hot 100 (Billboard) | 33 |
| Canada Country (Billboard) | 1 |
| US Billboard Hot 100 | 34 |
| US Country Airplay (Billboard) | 1 |
| US Hot Country Songs (Billboard) | 4 |

=== Year-end charts ===
| Chart (2014) | Position |
|---|---|
| US Country Airplay (Billboard) | 24 |
| US Hot Country Songs (Billboard) | 17 |

=== Certifications ===
| Region | Certification | Certified units/sales |
|---|---|---|
| United States (RIAA) | Platinum | 826,000 |
