= Only God Could Love You More =

Single by Jerrod Niemann

from the album Free the Music
- Released: October 29, 2012
- Recorded: 2012
- Genre: Country; country pop
- Length: 3:29
- Label: Sea Gayle; Arista Nashville
- Songwriters: Jerrod Niemann; Lee Brice; Jon Stone
- Producers: Jerrod Niemann; Dave Brainard

Jerrod Niemann singles chronology
"Shinin' on Me" (2012)	"Only God Could Love You More" (2012)	"Drink to That All Night" (2013)

"Only God Could Love You More" is a song co-written and recorded by American country music artist Jerrod Niemann. It was released in October 2012 as his fifth top 40 hit on the Hot Country Songs, and the second single from his album Free the Music. Niemann wrote this song with Lee Brice and Jon Stone.

== Critical reception ==
Giving it 4½ stars out of 5, Billy Dukes of Taste of Country said that it was "vulnerable á la 'Stay' by Sugarland" and that "the emotional strain in the singer’s voice fills in the story with blue heartache." It received an identical rating from Bobby Peacock of Roughstock, who also compared it to Sugarland and said that "This tight phrasing, inspired production, and overall flawless execution make it a real standout".

== Music video ==
The music video was directed by Eric Welch and premiered in February 2013.

== Chart performance ==
Chart (2012–2013)	Peak position
US Country Airplay (Billboard)	29
US Hot Country Songs (Billboard)	38
