= What Do You Want =

2010 song by Jerrod Niemann

Single by Jerrod Niemann

from the album Judge Jerrod & the Hung Jury
- Released: October 4, 2010
- Recorded: 2010
- Genre: Country
- Length: 3:34
- Label: Sea Gayle; Arista Nashville
- Songwriters: Jerrod Niemann; Richie Brown; Rachel Bradshaw
- Producers: Jerrod Niemann; Dave Brainard

Jerrod Niemann singles chronology
"Lover, Lover" (2010)	"What Do You Want" (2010)	"One More Drinkin' Song" (2011)

"What Do You Want" is a song co-written and recorded by American country music artist Jerrod Niemann. It was released in October 2010 as the second single from his album Judge Jerrod & the Hung Jury. The song is his second top 40 hit on the Hot Country Songs charts, following his number-one single "Lover, Lover".

== Content ==
The song is about a phone call received from a former girlfriend with whom the narrator has broken up. In an interview with CMT, he said that he wrote the song from an experience he had with a former girlfriend who had moved to India. He said that after breaking up with her, writing "What Do You Want" helped him "climb out of the funk".

The song features acoustic guitar, percussion and an organ. Niemann wrote it with Richie Brown and Rachel Bradshaw, the daughter of National Football League quarterback Terry Bradshaw, who also sings a backing vocal on it.

== Critical reception ==
Karlie Justus of Engine 145 gave the song a "thumbs up" in her review. She said that the song "relies on emotion over production" and thought that the lyrics and production had "oddly comforting repetition". Matt Bjorke of Roughstock rated the song four stars out of five, calling it a "moody, emotive piece of music" and thought that it showed Niemann's voice more strongly than "Lover, Lover" did.

== Music video ==
The song's music video, directed by Chris Hicky, was filmed at a mansion in Nashville, Tennessee. It was recorded in black and white. Niemann said that the video is "sort of abstract" because he wanted to leave parts of the storyline to the viewer's imagination. Rachel Bradshaw also plays the girlfriend in the video.

== Chart performance ==
"What Do You Want" debuted at number 49 on the Hot Country Songs chart dated for the week ending October 9, 2010. The song is Niemann's second top 40 hit on this chart. In April 2011, the song received a gold certification from the Recording Industry Association of America. That same month, it peaked at number 4 on the country chart.

Chart (2010–2011)	Peak position
US Hot Country Songs (Billboard)	4
US Billboard Hot 100	52

=== Year-end charts ===
Chart (2011)	Position
US Country Songs (Billboard)	20
