= Judge Jerrod & the Hung Jury =

Studio album by Jerrod Niemann
- Released: July 13, 2010
- Genre: Country
- Label: Sea Gayle/Arista Nashville
- Producer: Dave Brainard; Jerrod Niemann

Jerrod Niemann chronology
Jukebox of Hard Knocks (2004)	Judge Jerrod & the Hung Jury (2010)	Free the Music (2012)

Singles from Judge Jerrod & the Hung Jury
- 1. "Lover, Lover" Released: March 1, 2010; 2. "What Do You Want" Released: October 4, 2010; 3. "One More Drinkin' Song" Released: June 6, 2011

Professional ratings
Review scores
Source	Rating
Allmusic	4/5 stars
Country Weekly	3.5/5 stars
Roughstock	4/5 stars

Judge Jerrod & the Hung Jury is the third studio album by American country music singer Jerrod Niemann. It was released July 13, 2010 (see 2010 in country music) via Sea Gayle Music and Arista Nashville. It is his first major-label album, following two self-released albums and an unreleased compilation for Category 5 Records. The album contains the number-one single "Lover, Lover" and the top five hit "What Do You Want".

== Critical reception ==
The album has received favorable reviews. Matt Bjorke of Roughstock gave the album four stars out of five, calling it "one of the most creative and fun albums to come out in 2010." Rating it three-and-a-half stars out of five, Jessica Phillips of Country Weekly said that it had "well-worn themes" in its songs, but that its sound was an "unpredictable mashup of styles." Rhapsody praised the album, calling it one of 2010’s most overlooked releases. Claiming that it disappeared beneath “the release-date-obsessed radar,” they deemed it one of the best albums released in the first half of the year. Writing for Allmusic, Stephen Thomas Erlewine gave it four stars out of five, praising the variety of sounds on the album but criticizing the presence of the comedy skits.

== Track listing ==
No.	Title	Writer(s)	Length
1.	"Intro" (skit)	Jerrod Niemann, Dave Brainard	0:50
2.	"They Should Have Named You Cocaine"	Niemann, Jamey Johnson, Dallas Davidson	3:40
3.	"Lover, Lover"	Dan Pritzker	3:13
4.	"Phone Call at 3 AM" (skit)	Niemann, Brainard	1:30
5.	"Down in Mexico"	Niemann, Richie Brown, J.R. McCoy	3:12
6.	"What Do You Want"	Niemann, Brown, Rachel Bradshaw	3:34
7.	"A Friendly Request" (skit)	Niemann, Brainard	0:22
8.	"The Buckin' Song"	Robert Earl Keen	2:33
9.	"Old School New Again"	Brown, Niemann	3:43
10.	"Intermission" (skit)	Niemann, Brainard	0:41
11.	"Come Back to Me"	Niemann, Lance Miller, Trey Matthews	3:47
12.	"Drunken Complaint" (skit)	Niemann, Brainard	0:05
13.	"How Can I Be So Thirsty"	Niemann, John Anderson, Billy Joe Walker Jr.	2:36
14.	"Bakersfield"	Niemann, Battle, Steve Harwell	3:08
15.	"A Concerned Fan" (skit)	Niemann, Brainard	0:54
16.	"One More Drinkin' Song"	Niemann, Brown	2:47
17.	"I Hope You Get What You Deserve"	Niemann, Brown, Matthews	4:15
18.	"Deep Thoughts" (skit)	Niemann, Brainard	0:34
19.	"For Everclear"	Niemann	3:37
20.	"Outro" (skit)	Niemann, Brainard	0:46

== Personnel ==
As listed in liner notes.

=== Musicians ===
- Rachel Bradshaw – background vocals
- Dave Brainard – background vocals, acoustic guitar, electric guitar, 12-string guitar, bass guitar, ukulele, keyboards, percussion, programming
- Taryn Brainard – background vocals
- Cliff Canterbury – bass guitar, background vocals
- Will Doughty – piano, keyboards, Hammond B-3 organ
- Dustin Evans – background vocals
- Chris Hennessee – harmonica
- Larissa Maestro – cello
- David Mahurin – drums
- Scott McQueary – electric guitar, acoustic guitar
- Jerrod Niemann – lead vocals, background vocals, acoustic guitar, Wurlitzer electric piano, percussion, programming
- Tim Teague – electric guitar, B-Bender guitar
- Michael Tucker – djembe, percussion
- Ashtyn Wallace – background vocals
- Cole Wright – synthesizer

=== Skit performers ===
Melissa Baisden, Dave Brainard, Richie Brown, Dustin Evans, Sara France, David E. Gamble II, Julia Garlington, Perry Howard, Kristen Kutka, Tiffynee Mahurin, Jerrod Niemann, Dallas Rogers, Ashtyn Wallace, Cole Wright

=== Production ===
- Dave Brainard – editing, overdubs, mixing, production
- Tammie Harris Cleek – imaging, photoshoot production
- Don Cobb – mastering
- Eric Conn – mastering
- Jeremy Coward – photography
- Tracy Baskette Fleaner – creative director, package design
- Judy Forde-Blair – liner notes, creative production
- Robin Geary – grooming
- Jennifer Kemp – stylist
- Brian Kolb – mixing
- David Kolb – tracking engineer
- Scott McDaniel – creative direction
- Jerrod Niemann – mixing, production

== Chart performance ==
The album debuted at number one on the Billboard Top Country Albums chart, ending the 24-week Number One album reign of Lady Antebellum's Need You Now. It also became Niemann's first charting album on the Billboard 200 chart, debuting at number seven. As of the chart dated July 23, 2011, the album has sold 327,564 copies in the US.

=== Weekly charts ===
Chart (2010)	Peak position
US Billboard 200	7
US Top Country Albums (Billboard)	1

=== Year-end charts ===
Chart (2010)	Position
US Billboard 200	200
US Top Country Albums (Billboard)	42
Chart (2011)	Position
US Top Country Albums (Billboard)	36

=== Singles ===
Year	Single	Peak chart positions			Certifications (sales threshold)
Year	Single	US Country	US	CAN	Certifications (sales threshold)
2010	"Lover, Lover"	1	29	49	US: Platinum
2010	"What Do You Want"	4	52	—	US: Gold
2011	"One More Drinkin' Song"	13	72	—	
"—" denotes releases that did not chart
