= Shinin' on Me =

Single by Jerrod Niemann

from the album Free the Music
- Released: April 9, 2012
- Recorded: 2012
- Genre: Country
- Length: 3:14
- Label: Sea Gayle; Arista Nashville
- Songwriters: Jerrod Niemann; Lee Brice; Rob Hatch; Lance Miller
- Producers: Jerrod Niemann; Dave Brainard

Jerrod Niemann singles chronology
"One More Drinkin' Song" (2011)	"Shinin' on Me" (2012)	"Only God Could Love You More" (2012)

"Shinin' on Me" is a song co-written and recorded by American country music artist Jerrod Niemann. It was released in April 2012 as the first single from his album Free the Music. Niemann wrote the song with Lee Brice, Rob Hatch and Lance Miller while on tour with Brad Paisley.

The song received generally positive reviews from critics who praised the production and Niemann's relaxed performance. "Shinin' on Me" peaked at number 17 on both the Billboard Country Airplay and Hot Country Songs charts respectively. It also charted at number 92 on the Hot 100. The accompanying music video for the song was directed by Chris Hicky and features Niemann hanging out at a restaurant called "The Family Wash."

== Critical reception ==
Billy Dukes of Taste of Country gave the song two and a half stars out of five, writing that "there is little new to be excited about." Matt Bjorke of Roughstock gave the song four stars out of five, saying that "the melody is infectious and inviting as is Jerrod’s strong affinity to providing something instantly recognizable and different from everything else on country radio." The song also received a B+ from Kevin John Coyne of Country Universe, who wrote that Niemann "has a laid-back lyric and personable vocal performance to go with the cool instrumentation."

== Music video ==
The music video was directed by Chris Hicky and premiered in May 2012. It was filmed at The Family Wash in East Nashville.

== Chart performance ==
"Shinin' on Me" debuted at number 60 on the U.S. Billboard Hot Country Songs chart for the week of March 17, 2012. It also debuted at number 94 on the U.S. Billboard Hot 100 chart for the week of September 15, 2012.

Chart (2012)	Peak position
US Billboard Hot 100	92
US Country Airplay (Billboard)	17
US Hot Country Songs (Billboard)	17

=== Year-end charts ===
Chart (2012)	Position
US Country Songs (Billboard)	67
