= Lee Brice (album) =

Studio album by Lee Brice
- Released: November 3, 2017
- Genre: Country
- Length: 53:10
- Label: Curb Records
- Producer: Lee Brice; Dan Frizsell; Kyle Jacobs; Cody Labelle; Jon Stone

Lee Brice chronology
I Don't Dance (2014)	Lee Brice (2017)	Hey World (2020)

Singles from Lee Brice
- 1. "Boy" Released: June 19, 2017; 2. "Rumor" Released: July 16, 2018

Lee Brice is the fourth studio album by American country music artist of the same name. It was released on November 3, 2017, by Curb Records. The album's lead single is "Boy".

== Content ==
Brice first announced the album in mid-2017, following the release of lead single "Boy". He said that the "songs address themes of love, family and hard work." Brice co-produced with Dan Frizsell, Kyle Jacobs, Cody Labelle, and Jon Stone. "Boy" has charted within the Top 20 of Hot Country Songs.

"Songs in the Kitchen" was inspired by a quote from Kellie Pickler.

"American Nights" was previously recorded by Morgan Wallen on his 2016 EP, The Way I Talk and later recorded by the co-writer, Austin Jenckes, on his 2019 album, If You Grew Up Like I Did.

== Critical reception ==
Sounds Like Nashville writer Chuck Dauphin gave the album a positive review, stating that "the best material on this disc comes from real life and appreciating your blessings of what you have in life".

== Commercial performance ==
The album debuted at No. 36 on the Billboard 200, and No. 7 on the Top Country Albums, with 12,200 copies (15,000 album-equivalent units) sold in the first week. As of July 2019, it has sold 49,600 copies in the United States, and accrued 288,000 album equivalent units.

== Track listing ==
No.	Title	Writer(s)	Length
1.	"What Keeps You Up at Night"	Lee Brice; Jessi Alexander; Ross Copperman; Pete Wilson	3:32
2.	"Little Things"	Brice; Jaren Johnston; Neil Mason	2:30
3.	"American Nights"	Austin Jenckes; Jeff Middleton; Mike Walker	3:00
4.	"Boy"	Nicolle Galyon; Jon Nite	3:19
5.	"They Won't Forget About Us"	Brice; Rhett Akins; Dallas Davidson; Ashley Gorley	3:56
6.	"I Don't Smoke" (featuring Warren Haynes)	Brice; Jon Stone; Billy Montana; John Bohlinger	4:34
7.	"You Can't Help Who You Love"	Brice; Stone; Gorley	2:40
8.	"Rumor"	Brice; Gorley; Kyle Jacobs	3:43
9.	"The Locals"	Brice; Stone; Brian Bunn	3:23
10.	"Songs in the Kitchen"	Brice; Rob Hatch; Lance Miller	3:31
11.	"Story to Tell (Little Bird)" (featuring Edwin McCain and Warren Haynes)	Brice; Phillip Lammonds; Edwin McCain	3:36
12.	"Have a Good Day"	Brice; B. Montana; Randy Montana	2:58
13.	"Eyes Closed"	Michael P. Heeney; Johnston; Mason	4:45
14.	"Dixie Highway"	Brice; Stone; Matraca Berg	4:17
15.	"The Best Part of Me"	Lammonds; Chris Gelbuda	3:25
Total length:			53:10

== Personnel ==
Adapted from Lee Brice liner notes.

Musicians

- Jessi Alexander - background vocals
- Travis Bettis - acoustic guitar, electric guitar, slide guitar
- John Bohlinger - steel guitar, background vocals
- Lee Brice - lead and background vocals, percussion, bass guitar, piano, acoustic guitar, electric guitar, mandolin, banjo, theremin, harmonica, programming
- Tom Bukovac - electric guitar, mandolin, banjo
- Brian Bunn - programming
- Joeie Canaday - bass guitar
- Dave Cohen - piano, synthesizer
- Stephanie Curry - background vocals
- Dan Fernandez - electric guitar
- Paul Franklin - steel guitar
- Dan Frizsell - bass guitar, programming
- Ben Glover - background vocals
- Michael Gray - percussion
- Warren Haynes - slide guitar on "I Dont Smoke" and "Story to Tell (Little Bird)"
- Morgan Herbert - background vocals
- Kyle Jacobs - piano, synthesizer
- Mike Johnson - steel guitar
- Charlie Judge - synthesizer
- Jeff King - electric guitar, mandolin
- Cody Labelle - programming
- Donnie Marple - drums, percussion
- Edwin McCain - acoustic guitar and background vocals on "Story to Tell (Little Bird)"
- Pat McGrath - acoustic guitar
- Rob McNelley - acoustic guitar
- Jerry McPherson - electric guitar
- Billy Montana - bass guitar, harmonica, background vocals
- Gordon Mote - piano, Hammond organ, Wurlitzer electric piano
- Paul Rippee - bass guitar
- Jerry Roe - drums
- Kristen Rogers - background vocals
- Adam Shoenfeld - electric guitar
- Jimmie Lee Sloas - bass guitar
- Reggie Smith - Hammond organ, clavinet, background vocals
- Jon Stone - electric guitar, background vocals
- Derek Wells - electric guitar
- John Willis - acoustic guitar
- Nir Z. - drums

Technical

- Lee Brice - producer (all tracks), executive producer
- Dan Frizsell - producer (all tracks except 12), recording, mixing
- Kyle Jacobs - producer (tracks 1, 2, 4–8, 10, 11)
- Cody Labelle - producer (track 12)
- Andrew Mendelson - mastering
- Jon Stone - producer (all tracks except 3, 12, 15)

== Charts ==
=== Weekly charts ===
Chart (2017)	Peak position
Australian Albums (ARIA)	99
US Billboard 200	36
US Top Country Albums (Billboard)	7

=== Year-end charts ===
Chart (2019)	Position
US Top Country Albums (Billboard)	43

== Certifications ==
Region	Certification	Certified units/sales
United States (RIAA)	Gold	500,000^{‡}
^{‡} Sales+streaming figures based on certification alone.
