= That Don't Sound Like You =

Single by Lee Brice

from the album I Don't Dance
- Released: May 11, 2015
- Recorded: 2014
- Genre: Country
- Length: 3:30
- Label: Curb
- Songwriter(s): Lee Brice; Rhett Akins; Ashley Gorley
- Producer(s): Lee Brice; Jon Stone

Lee Brice singles chronology
"Drinking Class" (2014)	"That Don't Sound Like You" (2015)	"A Little More Love" (2016)

"That Don't Sound Like You" is a song co-written and recorded by American country music artist Lee Brice. It was released in May 2015 as the third single from his third studio album I Don't Dance. The song was written by Brice, Rhett Akins and Ashley Gorley.

== Content ==
The song is about a man calling a former lover, realizing that her new man has "stripped her of her fun-loving identity".

== Music video ==
The music video was directed by Ryan Smith and premiered in June 2015.

== Chart performance ==
The song has sold 333,000 copies in the United States as of May 2016. On October 18, 2017, the song was certified gold by the RIAA.

Chart (2015–2016)	Peak position
Canada (Canadian Hot 100)	75
Canada Country (Billboard)	38
US Billboard Hot 100	64
US Country Airplay (Billboard)	10
US Hot Country Songs (Billboard)	13

=== Year-end charts ===
Chart (2015)	Position
US Hot Country Songs (Billboard)	92

Chart (2016)	Position
US Country Airplay (Billboard)	51
US Hot Country Songs (Billboard)	50
