= Drinking Class =

Single by Lee Brice

from the album I Don't Dance
- Released: September 8, 2014
- Recorded: 2014
- Genre: Country
- Length: 3:27
- Label: Curb
- Songwriter(s): Josh Kear; David Frasier; Ed Hill
- Producer(s): Lee Brice; Kyle Jacobs; Matt McClure

Lee Brice singles chronology
"I Don't Dance" (2014)	"Drinking Class" (2014)	"That Don't Sound Like You" (2015)

"Drinking Class" is a song written by Josh Kear, David Frasier and Ed Hill and recorded by American country music artist Lee Brice. It was released in September 2014 as the second single from his third studio album, I Don't Dance.

== Critical reception ==
Billy Dukes of Taste of Country gave the song a favorable review, calling it "Brice's finest moment" and "a song that can't be ignored." Dukes also wrote that "there's not a hardworking American who won't relate to this song on some level."

== Music video ==
The music video was directed by Ryan Smith and premiered in November 2014.

== Commercial performance ==
"Drinking Class" debuted at number 48 on the US Billboard Country Airplay chart for the week of September 13, 2014. It also debuted at number 44 on Hot Country Songs for the week of August 30, 2014. As of May 2015, the song has sold 742,000 copies in the United States. In December 2015, it was declared the number one song of the year on the Billboard Country Airplay chart, making it the third song in that chart's history to do so without placing at number one at any point during the year; it peaked at number 2. On October 18, 2017, the song was certified platinum by the RIAA.

== Charts ==
Chart (2014–2015)	Peak position
Canada (Canadian Hot 100)	66
Canada Country (Billboard)	11
US Billboard Hot 100	53
US Country Airplay (Billboard)	2
US Hot Country Songs (Billboard)	3

=== Year-end charts ===
Chart (2014)	Position
US Country Airplay (Billboard)	97
US Hot Country Songs (Billboard)	88

Chart (2015)	Position
US Country Airplay (Billboard)	1
US Hot Country Songs (Billboard)	15

== Certifications ==
Region	Certification	Certified units/sales
United States (RIAA)	2× Platinum	2,000,000^{‡}
^{‡} Sales+streaming figures based on certification alone.
