= I Don't Dance (album) =

Studio album by Lee Brice
- Released: September 9, 2014
- Genre: Country
- Length: 48:56
- Label: Curb Records
- Producers: Lee Brice; Kyle Jacobs; Matt McClure; Jon Stone

Lee Brice chronology
Hard 2 Love (2012)	I Don't Dance (2014)	Lee Brice (2017)

Singles from I Don't Dance
- 1. "I Don't Dance" Released: February 18, 2014; 2. "Drinking Class" Released: September 8, 2014; 3. "That Don't Sound Like You" Released: May 11, 2015

I Don't Dance is the third studio album by American country music artist Lee Brice. It was released on September 9, 2014, by Curb Records.

== Content ==
The album's lead single is its title track, which became a number one single on Country Airplay in mid 2014. "Drinking Class" is the second single.

Brice produced the title track by himself; he co-produced with Jon Stone of American Young on tracks 2, 7–9, and 11–13, and Kyle Jacobs and Matt McClure on tracks 3–6, and 10. He also played every instrument on the track "Girls in Bikinis".

"Sirens" appears in the video game Madden NFL 16.

== Critical reception ==
Professional ratings
Review scores
Source	Rating
Allmusic	4/5 stars

I Don't Dance received positive reviews from music critics. It has a score of 69 out of 100 on Metacritic indicating "generally favorable reviews", based on 4 critics reviews. Jon Freeman of Country Weekly rated the album "B". He praised the songwriting of the title track, as well as "Drinkin' Class", "My Carolina", and "The Airport Song", and described Brice's voice as "spectacular, ranging from a gentle whisper to a right-from-the-gut, serrated-edge howl that elevates even the most forgettable material into high drama." Freeman also praised the sparseness of the album's production.

== Commercial performance ==
The album debuted on the Billboard 200 at No. 5, and No. 1 on the Top Country Albums chart with 39,000 copies sold in the United States in its debut week. The album has sold 247,400 copies in the US as of March 2016. On October 18, 2017, the song received gold status by the RIAA.

== Track listing ==
No.	Title	Writer(s)	Length
1.	"I Don't Dance"	Lee Brice; Rob Hatch; Dallas Davidson	3:41
2.	"No Better Than This"	Brice; Hatch; Vicky McGehee	4:13
3.	"Show You Off Tonight"	Brice; Kyle Jacobs; McGehee; Ben Glover	3:54
4.	"Always the Only One"	Brice; Jacobs; Joe Don Rooney	3:53
5.	"Good Man"	Brice; Jacobs; McGehee; Billy Montana	3:24
6.	"Drinking Class"	Josh Kear; David Frasier; Ed Hill	3:27
7.	"That Don't Sound Like You"	Brice; Rhett Akins; Ashley Gorley	3:30
8.	"Girls in Bikinis"	Brice; Rodney Clawson; Thomas Rhett; Chris Tompkins	3:13
9.	"Sirens"	Brice; Hatch; Jon Stone; Lance Miller	3:54
10.	"Somebody's Been Drinking"	Gorley; Hillary Lindsey; Shane McAnally	3:41
11.	"Hard to Figure Out (The Airport Song)"	Brice; Joe Leathers; Nicole Witt	3:25
12.	"My Carolina"	Brice; Phillip Lammonds	3:57
13.	"Panama City"	Mark Irwin; Tompkins; Kear	4:15
Total length:			48:56

Deluxe Edition
No.	Title	Writer(s)	Length
14.	"More My Style"	Brice; McGehee; Montana; Brian Davis	3:45
15.	"Closer"	Brice; Jon Stone; Jerrod Niemann	4:08
16.	"Whiskey Used to Burn"	Brice; Hatch; Miller	3:32
Total length:			1:00:21

== Personnel ==
Adapted from liner notes.

Musicians

- Lee Brice – lead vocals, acoustic guitar (1, 7–9, 12), electric guitar (3–5, 7, 11), string arrangements (5, 10), keyboards (8), banjo (8, 9) whistle (8), horn arrangements (10)
- Charlie Judge – keyboards (1, 3–8), programming (1–8, 11), string arrangements (5, 10), acoustic piano (6), horn arrangements (10), Hammond B3 organ (11), strings (11)
- Justin Niebank – programming (1)
- Tim Lauer – keyboards (2)
- Jason Webb – keyboards (3, 6), Hammond B3 organ (3, 6), acoustic piano (4), programming (6)
- Matt McClure – additional programming (3–6)
- Dan Frizsell – programming (12)
- Bradley Smith – Hammond B3 organ (12), acoustic piano (13)
- Travis Bettis – electric guitar (1, 2, 12)
- Jerry McPherson – electric guitar (1, 3–6, 9, 10), EBow (1)
- Tom Bukovac – electric guitar (2, 13)
- Jeff King – electric guitar (3–6, 9, 10)
- Pat McGrath – acoustic guitar (3–6, 10)
- Derek Wells – electric guitar (3–5, 10)
- Jon Stone – electric guitar (7), acoustic guitar (8, 11)
- Phillip Lammonds – acoustic guitar (12)
- Russ Pahl – steel guitar (1, 9)
- Mike Johnson – steel guitar (3–6)
- Paul Rippee – bass guitar (1, 2)
- Mark Hill – bass guitar (3, 5, 6, 10)
- Jimmie Lee Sloas – bass guitar (4, 11, 12)
- Kevin "Swine" Grantt – bass guitar (7)
- Tony Lucido – bass guitar (8, 9)
- Donnie Marple – drums (1, 4, 12)
- Greg Morrow – drums (2)
- Nir Z – drums (3, 5, 8–10)
- Miles McPherson – drums (6)
- Chad Cromwell – drums (7, 11)
- Eric Darken – percussion (1)
- Carolyn Bailey – strings (5, 10)
- Hari Bernstein – strings (5, 10)
- Jessica Blackwell – strings (5, 10)
- Charles Dixon – strings (5, 10), copyist (5, 10)
- Adrienne Harmon – strings (5, 10)
- June Iwasaki – strings (5, 10)
- Emily Nelson – strings (5, 10)
- Sarighani Reist – strings (5, 10)
- Jennifer Kummer – French horn (10)
- Patrick Walle – French horn (10)

Background vocals

- Lee Brice – backing vocals (1, 2, 4, 6–8, 11)
- Perry Coleman – backing vocals (2, 4–7, 11, 13)
- Kelley Norris – backing vocals (2)
- Jon Stone – backing vocals (2, 9), "Woos" and "Yeas" (8)
- Ben Glover – backing vocals (3)
- Sara Brice – talking girl (8)
- Russell Terrell – backing vocals (10)
- Bradley Smith – backing vocals (12)
- Maggie Rose – backing vocals (13)
- Kelly Norman – background noise (13)

Handclaps and "Heys" on "Sirens"

- Lee Brice
- Chip Esten
- Jon Stone

== Chart performance ==
=== Weekly charts ===
Chart (2014–16)	Peak position
Australian Albums (ARIA)	70
Canadian Albums (Billboard)	5
US Billboard 200	5
US Top Country Albums (Billboard)	1

=== Year-end charts ===
Chart (2014)	Position
US Top Country Albums (Billboard)	43
Chart (2015)	Position
US Billboard 200	157
US Top Country Albums (Billboard)	34

=== Singles ===
Year	Single	Peak chart positions				
Year	Single	US Country	US Country Airplay	US	CAN Country	CAN
2014	"I Don't Dance"	5	1	33	3	40
2014	"Drinking Class"	3	2	53	11	66
2015	"That Don't Sound Like You"	13	10	64	38	75

== Certifications ==
Region	Certification	Certified units/sales
United States (RIAA)	Platinum	1,000,000^{‡}
^{‡} Sales+streaming figures based on certification alone.
