= High Noon (Jerrod Niemann album) =

Studio album by Jerrod Niemann
- Released: March 25, 2014
- Genre: Country
- Label: Sea Gayle/Arista Nashville
- Producers: Jerrod Niemann; Jimmie Lee Sloas

Jerrod Niemann chronology
| Free the Music (2012) | High Noon (2014) | This Ride (2017) |

Singles from High Noon
- 1. "Drink to That All Night" Released: October 21, 2013; 2. "Donkey" Released: May 19, 2014; 3. "Buzz Back Girl" Released: July 14, 2014

High Noon is the fifth and third major-label studio album by American country music artist Jerrod Niemann. It was released on March 25, 2014, via Sea Gayle Music and Arista Nashville. The album includes Jerrod's second number one hit "Drink to That All Night," as well as a collaboration with Colt Ford.

== Critical reception ==
Professional ratings
Review scores
| Source | Rating |
|---|---|
| AllMusic | 2/5 stars |
| Country Weekly | A |
| The Oakland Press | 2.5/4 stars |
| Roughstock | 4.5/5 stars |
| USA Today | 2.5/4 stars |

High Noon received generally positive reviews from music critics. At Country Weekly, Jon Freeman graded the album an A, saying that on the release Niemann "doubles down on the electric approaches he has long favored and comes up with a bag full of surprises." In addition, Freeman writes that "It'll no doubt sound great at every cookout this summer, without sounding like anything else." Stephen Thomas Erlewine of AllMusic rated the album two out of five stars, saying that "Despite the cowboy stance of its title, there isn't much swagger on High Noon: it's all slick, smooth and rather slow; so mellow that even the odes to "Day Drinkin'" and "Beach Baby" barely quicken the pulse." Furthermore, Erlewine states that "Coming after the untrammeled Free the Music, this conservatism is certainly a disappointment but the crushing thing is, High Noon isn't merely cautious, it's boring." At USA Today, Brian Mansfield rated the album two-and-a-half stars out of four, writing that the "Single Drink to That All Night may be country's response to EDM, but Niemann's songs hold up even with stripped-down arrangements [...] Except, maybe, for the one that rhymes 'donkey' with 'honky-tonky.'" Gary Graff of The Oakland Press rated the album two-and-a-half stars out of four, stating that the release is "aptly titled" on which he's "definitely on target with what’s working in country these days, making Niemann at least a distinctive voice in a pack that’s rapidly towing the same line." At Roughstock, Matt Bjorke rated the album four-and-a-half stars out of five, and according to him the album "should solidify Niemann as a radio star" because the release comes with "plenty of hits" that are "the kind of songs that should be accepted by radio programmers and fans alike, especially since even when he’s featuring interesting melodies, the songs never feel like they are dressed up pop or rock songs."

== Track listing ==
| No. | Title | Writer(s) | Length |
|---|---|---|---|
| 1. | "Space" | Jerrod Niemann, Brian Davis, Joe Leathers | 3:45 |
| 2. | "Buzz Back Girl" | Lee Brice, Kyle Jacobs, Phillip Lammonds | 3:11 |
| 3. | "Drink to That All Night" | Derek George, Lance Miller, Brad Warren, Brett Warren | 3:45 |
| 4. | "I Can't Give In Anymore" | Richie Brown, Brad Passons | 3:43 |
| 5. | "We Know How to Rock" | Niemann, Brice, Miller, Billy Montana | 3:26 |
| 6. | "Come On, Come On" | Brown, Passons, Stephen Gause | 3:20 |
| 7. | "Lucky #7" | Niemann, Miller | 3:40 |
| 8. | "Donkey" | David Tolliver, Jacobs, Fred Wilhelm | 3:18 |
| 9. | "Day Drinkin'" | Niemann, Miller | 3:09 |
| 10. | "The Real Thing" | Niemann, Miller, Brad Warren, Brett Warren | 3:56 |
| 11. | "Beach Baby" | Niemann, Miller, Rob Hatch | 3:12 |
| 12. | "Refill" | Niemann, Miller, Brad Warren, Brett Warren | 2:57 |
| 13. | "She's Fine" (featuring Colt Ford) | Niemann, Miller, Ford | 3:24 |

== Personnel ==
- Tom Bukovac – electric guitar
- Smith Curry – steel guitar
- Eric Darken – percussion
- Will Doughty – keyboards, piano
- Fred Eltringham – drums
- Colt Ford – vocals on "She's Fine"
- Paul Franklin – steel guitar
- Derek George – background vocals
- Charlie Judge – keyboards
- Troy Lancaster – electric guitar
- Chris McHugh – drums
- Rob McNelley – acoustic guitar, electric guitar
- Jerry McPherson – bouzouki, electric guitar
- Phil Madeira – lap steel guitar
- Blair Masters – keyboards, programming
- Lance Miller – background vocals
- Greg Morrow – drums
- Jerrod Niemann – acoustic guitar, lead vocals, background vocals
- Brad Passans – background vocals
- Danny Rader – accordion, banjo, bouzouki, dobro, acoustic guitar, mandolin
- Adam Shoenfeld – electric guitar
- Jimmie Lee Sloas – bass guitar, piano, ukulele
- Tim Teague – electric guitar
- Russell Terrell – background vocals
- David Tolliver – animal sounds, background vocals
- Ilya Toshinsky – banjo, acoustic guitar, mandolin

== Chart performance ==
The album debuted at No. 18 on the Billboard 200, and No. 3 on the Top Country Albums charts, with sales of 14,000 on its first week. The album has sold 60,000 copies in the US as of August 2014.

=== Weekly charts ===
| Chart (2014) | Peak position |
|---|---|
| US Billboard 200 | 18 |
| US Top Country Albums (Billboard) | 3 |

=== Year-end charts ===
| Chart (2014) | Position |
|---|---|
| US Top Country Albums (Billboard) | 64 |

=== Singles ===
| Year | Single | Peak chart positions | | | | |
| Year | Single | US Country | US Country Airplay | US | CAN Country | CAN |
|---|---|---|---|---|---|---|
| 2013 | "Drink to That All Night" | 4 | 1 | 34 | 1 | 33 |
| 2014 | "Donkey" | 38 | 43 | — | — | — |
| 2014 | "Buzz Back Girl" | — | 35 | — | — | — |
