= Sonia Dada (album) =

Studio album by Sonia Dada
- Released: September 22, 1992
- Recorded: February–June 1992
- Length: 48:23
- Label: Chameleon
- Producer: Daniel Laszlo

Sonia Dada chronology
Sonia Dada (1992)	A Day at the Beach (1995)

Sonia Dada is the first album by Sonia Dada, released in 1992 on Chameleon Records. It was re-released with two extra tracks in 1994 on Calliope Records; one of these tracks, "Paradise", would also be included on the 1998 album My Secret Life.

The album reached number two on the Australian ARIA Charts and was the 13th-highest-selling album for the year of 1993.

== Track listing ==
1. "We Treat Each Other Cruel" – 4:09
2. "You Don't Treat Me No Good" – 4:08
3. "Jungle Song" – 4:42
4. "As Hard as It Seems" – 3:59
5. "You Ain't Thinking (About Me)" – 3:59
6. "The Edge of the World" – 4:31
7. "Cut It Up & Cry" – 4:39
8. "New York City" – 3:27
9. "Never See Me Again" – 3:57
10. "I Live Alone" – 3:54
11. "Deliver Me" – 4:41
12. "Deliver Me (Slight Return)" – 2:17

The re-released album had the following extra tracks at the end of the album:

13. "Paradise" – 5:08
14. "Mamba Wan Gama" – 1:27

== Charts ==
=== Weekly charts ===
Weekly chart performance for Sonia Dada
Chart (1993)	Peak position
Australian Albums (ARIA)	2
New Zealand Albums (RMNZ)	17
US Heatseekers Albums (Billboard)	29

=== Year-end charts ===
Year-end chart performance for Sonia Dada
Chart (1993)	Position
Australian Albums (ARIA)	13

== Certifications ==
Certifications for Sonia Dada
Region	Certification	Certified units/sales
Australia (ARIA)	2× Platinum	140,000^{^}
^{^} Shipments figures based on certification alone.
