= Boy (Lee Brice song) =

Single by Lee Brice

from the album Lee Brice
- Released: June 19, 2017
- Genre: Country
- Length: 3:19
- Label: Curb
- Songwriter(s): Nicolle Galyon; Jon Nite
- Producer(s): Lee Brice; Kyle Jacobs; Jon Stone; Dan Frizsell

Lee Brice singles chronology
"A Little More Love" (2016)	"Boy" (2017)	"Rumor" (2018)

"Boy" is a song written by Nicolle Galyon and Jon Nite and recorded by American country music singer Lee Brice. It was released in June 2017 as the lead single to Brice's self-titled fourth studio album.

== Content ==
Before Brice recorded the song, he had performed it in concert. He told The Boot that he chose to release it a single because whenever he performed it in concert, fans would hold up pictures of their sons. The song is about emotions expressed by a father to his son.

== Critical reception ==
An uncredited review in Taste of Country called it "a song that will connect with every father (or any parent) who is watching his children grow up too fast right before his eyes", while also praising the "gentle, lilting acoustic bed track" and Brice's singing voice.

== Commercial performance ==
The song peaked at No. 14 on the US Billboard's Hot Country Songs chart for the week dated March 10, 2018, and it peaked at No. 16 on the Country Airplay chart the same week, becoming his first single to miss the top 10 since “Beautiful Every Time” in 2011. It has sold 256,000 copies in the United States as of April 2018.

== Charts ==
=== Weekly charts ===
Chart (2017–2018)	Peak position
Canada Country (Billboard)	50
US Billboard Hot 100	94
US Country Airplay (Billboard)	16
US Hot Country Songs (Billboard)	14

=== Year-end charts ===
Chart (2017)	Position
US Hot Country Songs (Billboard)	82
Chart (2018)	Position
US Hot Country Songs (Billboard)	59

== Certifications ==
Region	Certification	Certified units/sales
United States (RIAA)	Platinum	1,000,000^{‡}
^{‡} Sales+streaming figures based on certification alone.
