= Buzz Back Girl =

Single by Jerrod Niemann

from the album High Noon
- Released: July 14, 2014
- Recorded: 2013–14
- Genre: Country
- Length: 3:18
- Label: Sea Gayle; Arista Nashville
- Songwriter(s): Lee Brice; Kyle Jacobs; Phillip Lammonds
- Producer(s): Jerrod Niemann; Jimmie Lee Sloas

Jerrod Niemann singles chronology
"Donkey" (2014)	"Buzz Back Girl" (2014)	"Blue Bandana" (2015)

"Buzz Back Girl" is a song recorded by American country music artist Jerrod Niemann. It was released in July 2014 as the third single from his album High Noon. The song was written by Lee Brice, Kyle Jacobs and Phillip Lammonds.

== Critical reception ==
Carrie Horton of Taste of Country gave the song a positive review, saying that "With ‘Buzz Back Girl’ Niemann has traded in the auto-tune sound of ‘Donkey’ and ‘Drink to That All Night’ for a more traditional country sound, but still holds on to the rock ‘n roll vibe that makes him unique."

== Music video ==
The music video was directed by Eric Welch and premiered in October 2014.

== Chart performance ==
The song peaked at number 35 on the Country Airplay chart.

Chart (2014)	Peak position
US Country Airplay (Billboard)	35
