= Steve Schnur =

- Born: Steve Schnur; Scotch Plains, New Jersey, U.S.
- Occupations: Worldwide Executive and President of Music; Electronic Arts (EA)

Steve Schnur is an American business executive who serves as Worldwide Executive and President of Music for Electronic Arts (EA), the largest video game producer in the world and home to titles like Madden NFL, The Sims and Medal of Honor.

Schnur was born in Scotch Plains, New Jersey, where he graduated from Scotch Plains-Fanwood High School. He has been a label and music publishing company president, TV executive producer, music supervisor, professional musician, songwriter, composer, record producer and more. At age 7, Schnur began to study guitar, piano, composition, production and arrangement at Carnegie Hall. By his early teens, he was playing piano in pop, rock and jazz bands with seasoned musicians.

== Professional development ==
He attended New York University's School Of Music Business & Technology, and met MTV co-founder, Les Garland;. He later became part of the programming department at MTV and was part of the video launches of Madonna, Michael Jackson, The Cure, Mötley Crüe. Schnur went on to hold various executive positions in promotions, marketing and A&R with Elektra Records, (1985–1990) and (1991–1992), Chrysalis Records, (1990–1991), Arista Records, (1992–1995), Arista Nashville, (1995–1999), and Capitol Records, (1999–2001); helping to orchestrate the breakthroughs of many major artists, which included Metallica, Sarah McLachlan, Coldplay, Bjork, Brad Paisley and more. He also served as music supervisor for hit movies Cruel Intentions and Miss Congeniality, which received a Golden Globe nomination for Best Original Song. Schnur also oversaw feature films such as Gun Shy, Sliding Doors, Excess Baggage, and Teaching Mrs. Tingle.

In 2001, Schnur joined Electronic Arts as Worldwide Executive of EA Music Group and is responsible for the creation and development of the global vision for music integration and marketing surrounding EA games. He has influenced visions for franchises such as NHL, NBA Live, NASCAR, Madden NFL, FIFA, and Need for Speed. Through those initiatives, he has helped launched the careers of various artists such as Thirty Seconds to Mars, Robyn, Fall Out Boy, K'naan, Katy Perry, Imagine Dragons, Kings of Leon, The Weeknd, and Florence + The Machine.

He has overseen the orchestration and production of 50 EA soundtrack albums – including original scores for The Sims, Mass Effect, Dragon Age, Medal of Honor, and Star Wars: Battlefront with composers that have included Mark Mothersbaugh, Michael Giacchino, Junkie XL, Steve Jablonsky and Hans Zimmer. His efforts have earned EA over 50 soundtrack nominations over the last 10 years.

In 2010, he formed Artwerk Music and Music Publishing Group and directly signed, developed and launched artists – including alternative breakthrough acts Matt & Kim, Chromeo, Airbourne and Ladytron – for publishing, master recordings, sync deals and distribution.

In 2011, he produced the No.1 Billboard hit “Dance On” and the Top 5 hit, “Undivided” featuring Snoop Dogg, each by Blush.

In 2012, he was Creator and Executive Producer of the E! Network television series “Opening Act,” which starred Lady Gaga, Rod Stewart, Nicki Minaj, Gym Class Heroes, LMFAO, and Jason Aldean.

In 2015, Schnur signed to an exclusive worldwide songwriter agreement with Sea Gayle Music, home to writers Brad Paisley and Brandy Clark.

In 2020, Steve was profiled by Rolling Stone for the feature article 'At Work With Steve Schnur, Who Decides The Music in Your Favorite Video Games.'

In collaboration with the Society of Composers & Lyricists (SCL), Schnur created the Music City Maestro Award, recognizing Nashville-based composers whose work is advancing the future of music for visual media. He also conceived the EA Game Changer Series, produced in partnership with the SCL, which brings together leading composers, producers, and industry innovators for in-depth discussions about the evolving intersection of music, technology, and storytelling. Both initiatives reflect Schnur’s ongoing commitment to empowering the creative community and fostering dialogue that shapes the next era of sound.

Beyond his creative work, Schnur’s dedication as an advocate and mentor has paved a path and elevated the careers of countless individuals. His partnership with Berklee College of Music established the EA/Berklee Charting Change Scholarship, providing financial support and mentorship to women and non-cisgender composers. In conjunction, Steve also co-created an annual Berklee event that celebrates women composers and inspires the next generation of musical storytellers. Schnur has also created and taught Berklee College of Music's popular online course 'Level Up: The Business of Videogame Music'.

Steve won the 2024 GRAMMY® Award for ‘Best Score Soundtrack For Video Games And Other Interactive Media’ for co-producing Star Wars Jedi: Survivor and the 2025 GRAMMY® for ‘Best Audiobook, Narration, and Storytelling Recording’ for co-producing Former President Jimmy Carter’s Last Sundays in Plains: A Centennial Celebration.

His op-eds on music, antisemitism and sociocultural issues have been published in Variety, Billboard, Rolling Stone, and The Jerusalem Post.

== Associations ==
Currently serves on the City of Hope board and Belmont University's Mike Curb College of Entertainment & Music Business board, where he acts as an adjunct professor. He is a voting member of the Grammy's Producers & Engineers Wing, advisor to the Nashville and Tribeca Film Festivals, Music Advisor to Major League Soccer as well as the U.S. National Men's and Women's soccer teams and has served as both chairman and chairman emeritus of The Grammy Foundation. Additionally, he is a former board member of the Country Music Association.

In 2012, Schnur co-founded The Creative Community For Peace and in 2021 co-founded The Black-Jewish Entertainment Alliance.

== Awards and recognition ==
- 2009: 'MUSEXPO's International Music Person of the Year
- 2009: ACLU’s Bill of Rights Award
- 2012: The Guild of Music Supervisor's Music Supervisor of the Year
- 2014: MUSEXPO’s International Music Supervisor of the Year
- Honored by The Lili Clare Foundation
- 2018: Best Music Supervision in a Video Game for FIFA 18 by The Guild of Music Supervisors
- 2019: Nomination: 'Best Music Supervision in a Video Game' by The Guild of Music Supervisors
- 2020: Nomination: 'Best Music Supervision in a Video Game' by The Guild of Music Supervisors
- 2021: Nomination: 'Best Music Supervision in a Video Game' by The Guild of Music Supervisors
- 2023: Best Music Supervision in a Video Game' by The Guild of Music Supervisors
- 2024: Society of Composers & Lyricists Trailblazer Award
- 2024: GRAMMY® Award Winner: ‘Best Score Soundtrack For Video Games And Other Interactive Media’ for Star Wars Jedi: Survivor
- 2025: Guild of Music Supervisors Winner: Best Music Supervision in a Video Game (Synch) -- EA FC 25
- 2025: Guild of Music Supervisors Winner: Best Music Supervision in a Video Game (Original Music) -- Dragon Age: The Veilguard
- 2025: GRAMMY® Award Winner: ‘Best Audiobook, Narration, and Storytelling Recording’ for Former President Jimmy Carter’s Last Sundays in Plains: A Centennial Celebration.
