= Donkey (song) =

Single by Jerrod Niemann

from the album High Noon
- Released: May 19, 2014
- Recorded: 2013–14
- Genre: Country
- Length: 3:18
- Label: Sea Gayle; Arista Nashville
- Songwriter(s): David Tolliver; Kyle Jacobs; Fred Wilhelm
- Producer(s): Jerrod Niemann; Jimmie Lee Sloas

Jerrod Niemann singles chronology
"Drink to That All Night" (2013)	"Donkey" (2014)	"Buzz Back Girl" (2014)

"Donkey" is a song recorded by American country music artist Jerrod Niemann. It was released in May 2014 as the second single from his album High Noon. The song was written by David Tolliver, Kyle Jacobs, and Fred Wilhelm.

== Critical reception ==
Website Taste of Country gave the song a positive review, saying that "it’s more down-home than the auto-tune-heavy ‘Drink to That All Night.’ This is the song that could get you up and dancing at any of the best country bars — and Niemann knows it."

== Chart performance ==
Chart (2014)	Peak position
US Country Airplay (Billboard)	43
US Hot Country Songs (Billboard)	38
