= You Ain't Thinking (About Me) =

1993 single by Sonia Dada

Single by Sonia Dada

from the album Sonia Dada
- B-side: "You Don't Treat Me No Good"
- Released: January 30, 1993
- Length: 3:52
- Label: Festival; Chameleon
- Songwriter: Daniel Laszlo
- Producers: Daniel Laszlo; Dan Pritzker

Sonia Dada singles chronology
"You Don't Treat Me No Good" (1992)	"You Ain't Thinking (About Me)" (1993)	"The Edge of the World" (1993)

"You Ain’t Thinking (About Me)" is a song by American soul group Sonia Dada. It was released on January 30, 1993, as the group's second single from their debut studio album and peaked at number three on the Australian ARIA Singles Chart, number 19 on the New Zealand RIANZ Singles Chart, and number 68 on the Canadian RPM 100 Hit Tracks chart. It was certified gold in Australia for shipments exceeding 35,000 copies.

== Track listings ==
Australian 7-inch single

A. "You Ain't Thinking (About Me)" (radio edit)
B. "You Don't Treat Me No Good"

Australasian CD and cassette single

1. "You Ain't Thinking (About Me)" (radio edit)
2. "You Ain't Thinking (About Me)" (album version)
3. "I Live Alone"
4. "You Don't Treat Me No Good" (Ebersold/Paige remix)
5. "You Don't Treat Me No Good" (Krampf remix)

== Charts ==
=== Weekly charts ===
Chart (1993)	Peak position
Australia (ARIA)	3
Canada Top Singles (RPM)	68
New Zealand (Recorded Music NZ)	19

=== Year-end charts ===
Chart (1993)	Position
Australia (ARIA)	40

== Certifications ==
Region	Certification	Certified units/sales
Australia (ARIA)	Gold	35,000^{^}
^{^} Shipments figures based on certification alone.
