= Barefootsoul =

...Barefootsoul

Studio album by Sonia Dada
- Released: August 20, 2002
- Genres: Rock music Soul
- Label: Calliope Records

Sonia Dada chronology
Lay Down and Love It Live (1999)	...Barefootsoul (2002)	Test Pattern (2004)

Professional ratings
Review scores
Source	Rating
AllMusic	3/5 stars

...Barefootsoul is the fourth studio album from Sonia Dada, released in 2002.

== Track listing ==
No.	Title	Writer(s)	Length
1.	"Better Brains"	Dan Pritzker, Nicholas Tremulis	3:50
2.	"Baby Woke Up"	Pritzker	3:25
3.	"Raise the Roofbeam"	Pritzker	4:39
4.	"Angel"	Pritzker	4:21
5.	"Daisy"	Pritzker	4:43
6.	"Cry"	Pritzker	4:43
7.	"Louise"	Pritzker, Jim Tullio	4:56
8.	"I Saw Sister Stealing"	Pritzker	4:11
9.	"Happy Together"	Pritzker	4:10
10.	"Sometimes"	Pritzker, Dave Resnik	7:02
