= CJ Solar =

American country music singer-songwriter

- Born: Curtis Justin Solar Jr. September 26, 1992 (age 34); Baton Rouge, Louisiana
- Origin: Nashville, Tennessee
- Genres: Country; country rock
- Instruments: Guitar; vocals
- Website: www.cjsolar.com

Curtis Justin Solar Jr. (born September 26, 1992) is an American country music singer-songwriter from Baton Rouge, Louisiana. As a musician, Solar has cited Southern rock acts such as Lynyrd Skynyrd and Creedence Clearwater Revival as influences, along with grunge bands of the 1990s such as Nirvana, Stone Temple Pilots, and Soundgarden. As a songwriter, Solar had a number one hit as a co-writer on Morgan Wallen's "Up Down", and a second number one with "Some Girls" by Jameson Rodgers. He has written songs for Jason Aldean, Jerrod Niemann, Justin Moore, and others. As an artist, Solar was named by Rolling Stone as a "New Artist You Need to Know" and has opened for acts such as Lynyrd Skynyrd, 38 Special, Gary Allan, Chris Janson, and Hank Williams Jr.

== Career History ==
Solar graduated from Belmont University in 2014 with a degree in songwriting. Prior to graduating he signed a publishing deal with Sea Gayle Music Publishing, a publishing company co-owned by Brad Paisley and Chris DuBois.

In February 2019, Solar won MusicRow's Independent Artist of the Year. In August 2021, Solar signed an exclusive publishing deal with Edgehill Music Publishing. In January 2022, Solar signed with EMPIRE and his first release on the label was the album "The Future's Neon" in August 2022.
