= Free the Music =

Studio album by Jerrod Niemann
- Released: October 2, 2012
- Genre: Country
- Length: 41:30
- Label: Sea Gayle Music/Arista Nashville
- Producer: Dave Brainard; Jerrod Niemann

Jerrod Niemann chronology
Judge Jerrod & the Hung Jury (2010)	Free the Music (2012)	High Noon (2014)

Singles from Free the Music
- 1. "Shinin' on Me" Released: April 9, 2012; 2. "Only God Could Love You More" Released: October 29, 2012

Professional ratings
Review scores
Source	Rating
Allmusic	4/5 stars

Free the Music is the fourth and second major-label studio album by American country music artist Jerrod Niemann. It was released on October 2, 2012, via Sea Gayle Music and Arista Nashville. Niemann co-produced the album and wrote or co-wrote all twelve tracks. The album features a duet with Colbie Caillat, "All About You."

== Track listing ==
Free the Music track listing
No.	Title	Writer(s)	Length
1.	"Free the Music"	Jerrod Niemann	3:41
2.	"Whiskey Kind of Way"	Niemann, Randy Boudreaux	3:32
3.	"Get On Up"	Niemann, J. R. McCoy, Jesse Clingan	3:19
4.	"I'll Have to Kill the Pain"	Niemann, McCoy, Arlos Smith	3:25
5.	"Only God Could Love You More"	Niemann, Jon Stone, Lee Brice	3:29
6.	"Shinin' on Me"	Niemann, Rob Hatch, Brice, Lance Miller	3:14
7.	"Honky Tonk Fever"	Niemann	3:25
8.	"Guessing Games"	Niemann, McCoy	3:44
9.	"It Won't Matter Anymore"	Niemann, Hatch, Miller	2:49
10.	"All About You" (featuring Colbie Caillat)	Niemann, Richie Brown	3:26
11.	"Real Women Drink Beer"	Niemann, Houston Phillips	3:11
12.	"Fraction of a Man"	Niemann	4:15

== Personnel ==
- Dave Brainard – upright bass, bass guitar, acoustic guitar, electric guitar, harmonica, keyboards, percussion
- Taryn Brainard – background vocals
- Colbie Caillat – background vocals on "All About You"
- Cliff Canterbury – background vocals
- Devri DePriest – French horn
- Will Doughty – piano, keyboards, Hammond B-3 organ
- Dustin Evans – pitched beer bottles
- John Christopher Hamm – trumpet
- William Elliott – trombone
- Chris Estes – reggae drums
- Rob Hatch – background vocals
- Byron House – upright bass
- Bill Huber – tuba
- Tim Lauer – accordion
- David Mahurin – drums
- J.R. McCoy – percussion, congas, finger snaps, hand claps
- Lance Miller – background vocals
- Travis Mobley – piano, Wurlitzer electric piano
- Natalie Murphy – violin
- Jerrod Niemann – acoustic guitar, lead vocals, background vocals
- Tim Teague – acoustic B-bender guitar, electric guitar
- Carl Utterstom – trombone
- Karl Wingruber – saxophone, clarinet

== Chart performance ==
=== Album ===
Chart performance for Free the Music
Chart (2012)	Peak position
US Billboard 200	62
US Billboard Top Country Albums	9

=== Singles ===
Chart performance for singles from Free the Music
Year	Title	Peak chart positions		
Year	Title	US Country	US Country Airplay	US
2012	"Shinin' on Me"	17	17	92
2012	"Only God Could Love You More"	38	29	—
"—" denotes releases that did not chart
