= Test Pattern (album) =

Studio album by Sonia Dada
- Released: June 22, 2004
- Genre: Rock music Soul
- Label: Razor & Tie
- Producer: Scott Steiner & Sonia Dada

Sonia Dada chronology
...Barefootsoul (2002)	Test Pattern (2004)

Professional ratings
Review scores
Source	Rating
AllMusic	4/5 stars

Test Pattern is an album by Sonia Dada released in 2004 on Razor & Tie Records. The album was released in a gatefold CD/DVD packaging featuring a half-hour short film by Jeth Weinrich, as well as an accompanying montage for the entire album.

The first track, "Moons of Jupiter", samples a female vocal line that was also used at the beginning of the Firefly episode, Heart of Gold.

== Track listing ==
No.	Title	Writer(s)	Length
1.	"Moons of Jupiter"	Dan Pritzker	4:30
2.	"Saturday"	Pritzker	4:53
3.	"Temple"	Chris Cameron, Pritzker	4:03
4.	"Gordon"	Pritzker	3:08
5.	"Old Bones"	Pritzker	3:13
6.	"Diggin' on a Road"	Pritzker, Erik Scott	4:13
7.	"Ragdoll"	Pritzker	4:50
8.	"Sundogs"	Ron Schwartz, Scott	2:48
9.	"Take Back"	Pritzker, David Resnik, Scott	5:48
10.	"Lights Out"	Pritzker, Resnik, Schwartz, Scott	3:25
11.	"Dark Visions"	Pritzker	5:32
12.	"Sylvia"	Pritzker	2:48
