= A Day at the Beach (album) =

Studio album by Sonia Dada
- Released: March 21, 1995
- Genre: Rock, soul, blues
- Length: 51:37
- Label: Capricorn
- Producer: Sonia Dada

Sonia Dada chronology
Sonia Dada (1992)	A Day at the Beach (1995)	My Secret Life (1998)

Professional ratings
Review scores
Source	Rating
AllMusic	3/5 stars
The Indianapolis Star	1.5/4 stars

A Day at the Beach is the second album by the Chicago-based rock, soul, and rhythm and blues group Sonia Dada, released in 1995. It was produced by the band.

== Critical reception ==
The Philadelphia Daily News wrote that Sonia Dada "serves up rock, gospel, doo-wop, soul and R&B ... This means either they're eclectic, or they're groping." The Indianapolis Star deemed the album "a frothy arena-band sound with simply nice vocals, something you might get by mixing Toto and the Little River Band."

== Track listing ==
Sources: Official Site, AllMusic

No.	Title	Length
1.	"Screaming John"	5:46
2.	"Last Parade (Crazy Lady)"	5:02
3.	"Take Me Back" (Andraé Crouch)	0:32
4.	"Lay My Body Down"	4:09
5.	"The River Runs Slow"	3:54
6.	"Anna Lee"	4:40
7.	"Lester's Methadone Clinic"	3:43
8.	"Sail Away (Dan Pritzker / David Resnik / E.C. Scott)"	4:09
9.	"Oh No"	4:56
10.	"Planes and Satellites"	4:47
11.	"Amazing Jane"	7:32
12.	"Wishing Tree"	2:27
