= I Don't Dance (Lee Brice song) =

Single by Lee Brice

from the album I Don't Dance
- Released: February 18, 2014
- Recorded: 2014
- Genre: Country
- Length: 3:59 (original version); 3:41 (radio edit)
- Label: Curb
- Songwriter(s): Lee Brice; Rob Hatch; Dallas Davidson
- Producer(s): Lee Brice

Lee Brice singles chronology
"Parking Lot Party" (2013)	"I Don't Dance" (2014)	"Drinking Class" (2014)

"I Don't Dance" is a song co-written and recorded by American country music artist Lee Brice. It was released on February 18, 2014 as the first single and title track from Brice's third studio album of the same name. Brice co-wrote the song with Rob Hatch and Dallas Davidson.

== Content ==
The song is set in the key of C-sharp major with a vocal range of G♯_{2}-G♯_{4} and a main chord pattern of C♯-F♯-G♯-C♯. Lyrically, it is about a man who does not enjoy dancing, but will participate if his wife is doing so. While writing the song with Rob Hatch and Dallas Davidson, he created a demo recording with just his voice and acoustic guitar, to which his producer added other instruments. Brice said that he originally intended to write the song as a tribute to his wife.

== Critical reception ==
The song received a favorable review from Taste of Country, which called it "personal, like almost every song on the Hard 2 Love album, but also powerful and experimental like Brice’s early recordings." The reviewer added that "it’s the thump of a deep drum — perhaps a tympani — and loud cry of the pedal steel that provide the song’s signature and any emotional reaction that comes while listening." Matt Bjorke of Roughstock gave the song four stars out of five, writing that "the production and melody behind the lyrics is mid-tempo and right in the core pocket of what Lee Brice does best." Bjorke called it "a strong single choice and a song that should be the beginnings of a successful upcoming album."

== Music video ==
The music video was directed by Ryan Smith and premiered in April 2014.

== Commercial performance ==
"I Don't Dance" debuted at number 59 on the U.S. Billboard Country Airplay chart for the week of February 22, 2014. It also debuted at number 24 on the U.S. Billboard Hot Country Songs chart for the week of March 15, 2014. It also debuted at number 89 on the U.S. Billboard Hot 100 chart for the week of May 3, 2014. The song was certified Platinum on September 2, 2014, and reached over a million copies sold on September 24, 2014. As of April 2015, the song has sold 1,303,000 copies in the US. On February 3, 2017, the song received a double platinum status by the RIAA.

== Charts and certifications ==
=== Weekly charts ===
Chart (2014)	Peak position
Canada (Canadian Hot 100)	40
Canada Country (Billboard)	3
US Billboard Hot 100	33
US Country Airplay (Billboard)	1
US Hot Country Songs (Billboard)	5

=== Year-end charts ===
Chart (2014)	Position
US Billboard Hot 100	98
US Country Airplay (Billboard)	28
US Hot Country Songs (Billboard)	12

=== Certifications ===
Region	Certification	Certified units/sales
Canada (Music Canada)	Gold	40,000^{*}
United States (RIAA)	4× Platinum	4,000,000^{‡}
^{*} Sales figures based on certification alone.^{‡} Sales+streaming figures based on certification alone.
