= Jerrod Niemann =

American singer-songwriter

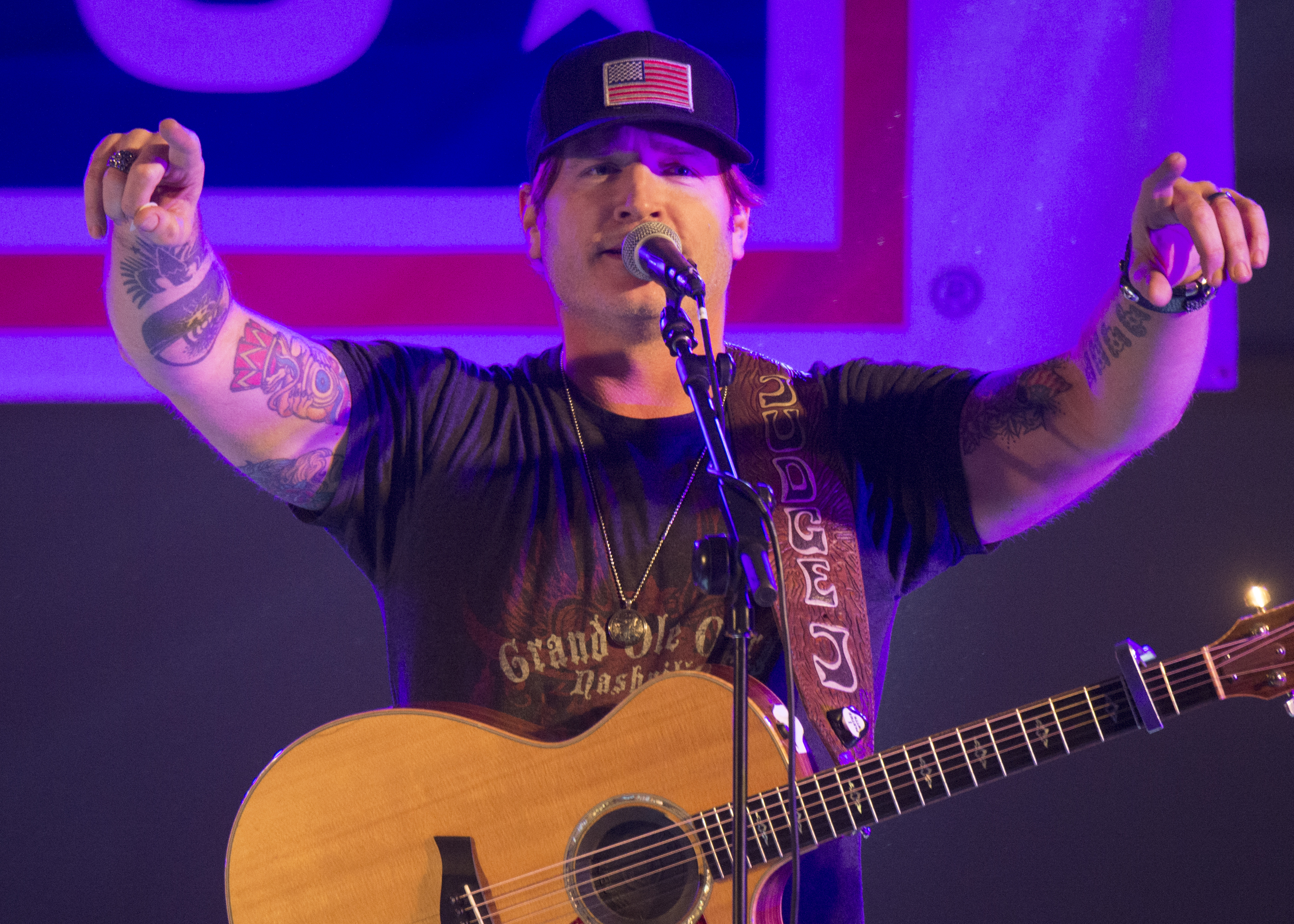
- Niemann performing at Morón Air Base in Spain

Background information
- Born: Jerrod Lee Niemann; July 24, 1979 (age 46)
- Origin: Liberal, Kansas, U.S.
- Genres: Country
- Occupation: Singer-songwriter
- Instruments: Vocals, guitar
- Years active: 1999–present
- Labels: Mercury Nashville; Category 5; Sea Gayle Music/Arista Nashville; Curb
- Website: http://www.jerrodniemannofficial.com/

Jerrod Lee Niemann (born July 24, 1979) is an American country music singer and songwriter. He has released one single for Category 5 Records (2006); three albums for Sea Gayle Music/Arista Nashville: Judge Jerrod & the Hung Jury (2010), Free the Music (2012), and High Noon (2014); and one album, This Ride (2017), for Curb Records. These albums have produced a combined ten Top 40 entries on the Hot Country Songs and Country Airplay charts, including the Platinum Number 1 singles "Lover, Lover" (a cover of Sonia Dada's "You Don't Treat Me No Good") and "Drink to That All Night" and Gold Top 5 single "What Do You Want". He has also co-written three singles for Garth Brooks: the chart topping Chris LeDoux tribute "Good Ride Cowboy", as well as "That Girl Is a Cowboy" and "Midnight Sun". Jamey Johnson, Lee Brice, Blake Shelton, Colbie Caillat, Diamond Rio, The Cadillac Three, Mark Chesnutt, John Anderson, Neal McCoy, Christian Kane, and Julie Roberts have also recorded Niemann's songs.

== Career ==
=== Singer ===
Niemann was born in Harper, Kansas, but raised in Liberal, Kansas. From an early age, he was influenced by country acts such as Lefty Frizzell, Keith Whitley, and George Strait. He learned to play his first musical instrument on a Tracy Lawrence autographed guitar his mother won in a contest at a Lawrence concert.

After graduating from Liberal High School, Niemann attended South Plains College in Levelland, Texas. Niemann began his professional music career by singing and playing acoustic guitar in Texas clubs and bars, particularly the Stockyard Saloon and the historic White Elephant Saloon located in the Fort Worth Stockyards. In 1999 he self-released his debut album Long Hard Road.

Niemann moved to Nashville, Tennessee, in September 2000. He signed a developmental deal with Mercury Records in August 2001 but did not release anything on the label. After parting with Mercury Records, Niemann and his band continued touring the club circuit across America playing venues such as the Grizzly Rose in Denver and the Wildhorse Saloon in Nashville. He soon traveled to Europe to tour with the band Kane consisting of members Christian Kane and Steve Carlson.

In 2006, he signed to Category 5 Records and charted with the single "I Love Women (My Momma Can't Stand)". The label closed shortly after this single's release, and the album Behind This Microphone was never released.

=== 2010–2015: Arista Nashville ===
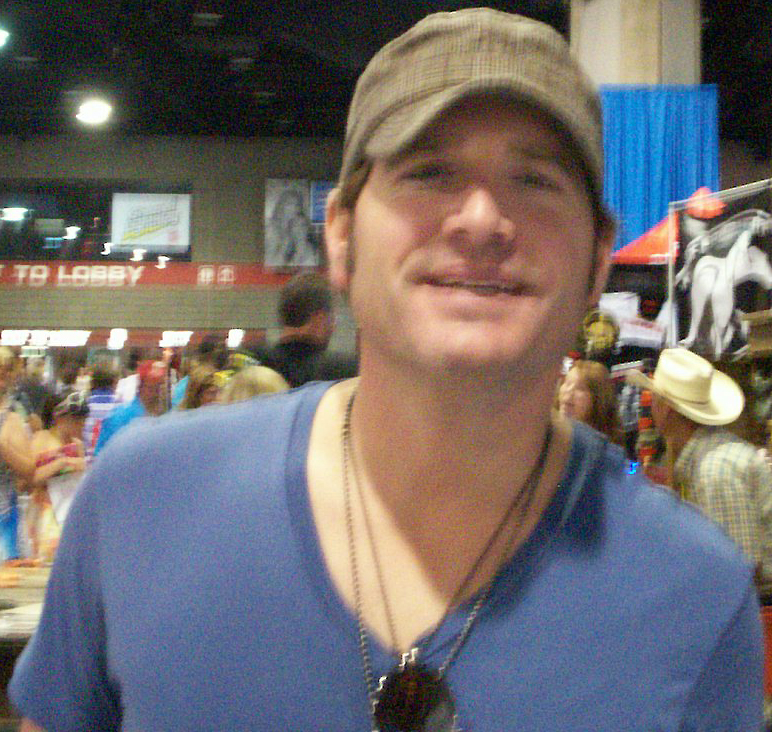
Niemann at CMA Music Festival, 2010.

Niemann signed to Arista Nashville's Sea Gayle division, co-owned by Brad Paisley, in 2010. His debut single "Lover, Lover" was released in early 2010; it was originally recorded by the folk music group Sonia Dada under the title "You Don't Treat Me No Good" and was a number one single in Australia in 1992. In March 2010, "Lover, Lover" became Niemann's first top 40 single on the country music charts and in August 2010 hit number one. The song is included on his first major-label album Judge Jerrod & the Hung Jury, which debuted at number one on the Billboard Top Country Sales Chart. The album also was named one of The New York Times' Top 10 Albums of the Year. The album's second single, "What Do You Want", debuted on the U.S. Billboard Hot Country Songs chart that October. In November 2010, Niemann was nominated in the New Artist category for that year's Country Music Association Awards. At the 2010 American Country Awards, Niemann was nominated for Artist of the Year: Breakthrough Artist, Single of the Year: Breakthrough Artist, and Music Video: Breakthrough Artist for "Lover, Lover". He was also nominated for Breakthrough Video of the Year for "Lover, Lover" at the 2011 Country Music Television Music Awards. In May 2011, "What Do You Want" peaked at number 4. The album's third single, "One More Drinkin' Song", reached number 13 in December 2011. Niemann finished up the year with four nominations at the American Country Awards, including Artist of the Year: New Artist, Music Video of the Year, Music Video: Male, and Music Video: New Artist for "What Do You Want".

Niemann released his fourth Arista single, "Shinin' on Me", on April 9, 2012. His second Arista album, Free the Music, was released on October 2, 2012. The album's second single, "Only God Could Love You More", charted late in the year.

"Drink to That All Night" was released in late 2013 as the first single off of his third album for Arista. The album, High Noon, was released in March 2014, debuting at number 2 on the Billboard Top Country Sales chart. In April 2014, "Drink to That All Night" became his second number one single. Niemann collaborated with Pitbull on the remix of the song. Singles "Donkey" and "Buzz Back Girl" were also released off this album.

=== 2016–present: Curb ===
Niemann parted ways with Arista Nashville in January 2016, shortly after releasing another single titled "Blue Bandana". In March 2016, Niemann signed a record deal with Curb Records. His first single for the label was "A Little More Love", a duet with Lee Brice. It reached the top 30 of the Country Airplay chart.

In March 2017, Niemann released "God Made a Woman," which he called his "favorite song I’ve ever recorded." Niemann's wife, Morgan, is featured in the music video. It served as the lead-off single to his fourth studio album, This Ride, which was released via Curb Records on October 6, 2017. "I Got This" was released as the album's second single, and it peaked in the top 40 of the Country Airplay chart.

After exiting Curb, Niemann independently released a digital-only album entitled Lost & Found in 2020. The release includes two singles: "Ghost Rider" and "Tequila Kisses".

=== Songwriting ===
At the age of 8, Niemann was writing several songs a year. He found legendary Nashville songwriters such as Whitey Shafer, Dean Dillon, and Paul Overstreet to be very influential in his songwriting and went on to co-write with all three while living there. Aged 10 he performed original songs in local talent shows in Kansas. After collecting several compositions throughout high school, Niemann recorded his debut album Long Hard Road in Clovis, New Mexico, while attending college in Levelland, Texas.

In May 2001, Niemann was contacted by Garth Brooks to collaborate, along with fellow songwriter Richie Brown. Niemann went on to co-write three singles for Garth Brooks: the Chris LeDoux tribute "Good Ride Cowboy", as well as "That Girl Is a Cowboy" and "Midnight Sun". "Good Ride Cowboy" earned Niemann a Broadcast Music Incorporated award for being one of the most played country songs of 2006. Niemann was awarded two BMI awards in 2012 for "What Do You Want" and "One More Drinking Song", each being one of the most played songs of the year.

Other artists who have recorded Niemann's work include Jamey Johnson, Lee Brice, Blake Shelton, Colbie Caillat, Diamond Rio, The Cadillac Three, Mark Chesnutt, John Anderson (musician), Neal McCoy, Christian Kane, and Julie Roberts. Niemann has signed publishing deals throughout his career with Marathon Key Music (a co-venture with Warner/Chappell Music) and Sea Gayle Music.

== Personal life ==
On March 6, 2012, Niemann's tour bus caught fire. He was unharmed. Niemann credits fellow country singer Lee Brice for alerting him to the dangerous blaze.

Niemann became engaged to longtime girlfriend Morgan Petek in New Orleans in late 2013. Niemann and Petek appeared on TLC TV series Say Yes to the Dress with Niemann's family to pick out Petek's wedding dress. They married on October 12, 2014, in San Juan, Puerto Rico. Niemann and Petek founded non-profit "Free the Music USA", which provides musical equipment and education to children in need. They are also actively involved with many animal rescue non-profits. Niemann is also involved with the United Service Organizations and went to Afghanistan, Kuwait, Romania, and Kosovo in 2016 on his first overseas tour. Jerrod and Morgan divorced after more than four years of marriage. The divorce was finalized on December 17, 2018.

== Discography ==
Studio albums

- Long Hard Road (1999)
- Jukebox of Hard Knocks (2004)
- Judge Jerrod & the Hung Jury (2010)
- Free the Music (2012)
- High Noon (2014)
- This Ride (2017)
