= Sonia Dada =

American rock, soul, and R&B band

- Origin: Chicago, Illinois, U.S.
- Genres: Rock, soul, R&B
- Years active: 1990–2005
- Labels: Chameleon; Capricorn; Calliope; Razor & Tie
- Members: See below
- Website: soniadada.com

Sonia Dada was an American rock, soul, and R&B band, formed in Chicago in 1990. Founding member Daniel Pritzker enlisted Michael Scott, Paris Delane, and Sam Hogan after hearing the latter three sing in a subway station. Sonia Dada became a mainstay of the Chicago musical scene in the years since, incorporating elements of rock, soul, gospel, and funk.

Their 1992 debut album, Sonia Dada, produced a major radio hit, "You Don't Treat Me No Good", and sold more than 100,000 copies. The album peaked at number 29 on Billboard's Heatseekers chart in 1993. In 1994, the band's tour saw them opening for the group Traffic, as well as headlining an extremely successful Australian tour. The album reached number two on the Australian ARIA charts and was the 13th-highest-selling album for the year of 1993. The single "You Don't Treat Me No Good" spent four weeks at number one on the ARIA singles chart and was the third-highest-selling single for the same year, while "You Ain't Thinking (About Me)" was the 40th-highest-selling single. However, they are known primarily as a one-hit wonder in Australia. On the Australian ARIA charts, "You Aint Thinking (About Me)" reached number three.

Since then, Sonia Dada released four studio albums and a live album. Their 2004 release, Test Pattern, was released in a deluxe edition with a bonus DVD containing short films by Jeth Weinrich.

== Members ==
- Daniel Pritzker – guitar
- Michael Scott – vocals
- Paris Delane – vocals
- Sam Hogan – vocals
- Shawn Christopher – vocals
- Dave Resnik – guitar
- Phil Miller – guitar
- Erik Scott – bass guitar
- Hank Guaglianone – drums
- Larry Beers – drums
- Chris "Hambone" Cameron – keyboards
- Ron Schwartz – keyboards and production
- Scott Steiner – audio engineer

== Discography ==
=== Studio albums ===
List of studio albums, with selected details, chart positions and certifications
Title	Album details	Peak chart positions			Certification
Title	Album details	AUS	NZ	US Heat.	Certification
Sonia Dada	Release date: September 22, 1992; Label: Chameleon	2	17	29	ARIA: 2× Platinum
A Day at the Beach	Release date: March 21, 1995; Label: Capricorn	—	—	—	
My Secret Life	Release date: June 9, 1998; Label: Capricorn	—	—	—	
Barefootsoul	Release date: August 20, 2002; Label: Calliope	—	—	—	
Test Pattern	Release date: June 22, 2004; Label: Razor & Tie	—	—	—	
"—" denotes releases that did not chart

=== Live albums ===
List of compilation albums, with selected details
Title	Album details
Lay Down and Love It Live	Release date: October 12, 1999; Label: Calliope

=== Singles ===
List of singles, with selected chart positions and certifications
Title	Year	Peak chart positions		Certification	Album
Title	Year	AUS	NZ	Certification	Album
"You Don't Treat Me No Good"	1992	1	2	ARIA: 3× Platinum	Sonia Dada
"You Ain't Thinking (About Me)"	1993	3	19	ARIA: Gold	Sonia Dada
"The Edge of the World"	1993	64	—		Sonia Dada
"New York City"	1993	—	—		Sonia Dada
"Paradise"	1993	96	—		Sonia Dada (1994 re-release)
"Sail Away"	1995	—	—		A Day at the Beach
"Screaming John"	1996	—	—		A Day at the Beach
"I Want to Take You Higher"	1999	—	—		Lay Down and Love It Live
"Baby Woke Up"	2002	—	—		Barefootsoul
"Old Bones"	2005	—	—		Test Pattern
"—" denotes releases that did not chart
