= A Little More Love (Jerrod Niemann and Lee Brice song) =

Single by Jerrod Niemann and Lee Brice

from the album This Ride
- Released: April 29, 2016
- Genre: Country
- Length: 3:00
- Label: Curb
- Songwriter(s): Shane McAnally; Ross Copperman; Natalie Hemby; Kristi Neumann
- Producer(s): Jerrod Niemann; Jimmie Lee Sloas; Lee Brice

Jerrod Niemann singles chronology
| "Blue Bandana" (2015) | "A Little More Love" (2016) | "God Made a Woman" (2017) |

Lee Brice singles chronology
| "That Don't Sound Like You" (2015) | "A Little More Love" (2016) | "Boy" (2017) |

"A Little More Love" is a song recorded as a duet by American country music artists Jerrod Niemann and Lee Brice. It was released in April 2016 as the first single from Niemann's fourth studio album, This Ride. The song was written by Shane McAnally, Ross Copperman, Natalie Hemby and Kristi Neumann. The song was Niemann's first single released through Curb Records.

== Critical reception ==
Billy Dukes of Taste of Country reviewed the single with favor, praising its summer vibe, writing The lyrics of “A Little More Love” fit Niemann’s brand of left-of-center country music perfectly, and his delightful exchanges with Brice are off the cuff, loose and inspired. Two singers who didn’t know each other as well as they do could not pull off the chemistry this funky beat is built on.

== Chart performance ==
| Chart (2016) | Peak position |
|---|---|
| US Country Airplay (Billboard) | 28 |
| US Hot Country Songs (Billboard) | 41 |
