= My Secret Life (Sonia Dada album) =

Studio album by Sonia Dada
- Released: June 9, 1998
- Genre: Rock music Soul
- Label: Capricorn Records
- Producer: Barry Beckett, Dan Pritzker

Sonia Dada chronology
A Day at the Beach (1995)	My Secret Life (1998)	Lay Down and Love It Live (1999)

Professional ratings
Review scores
Source	Rating
AllMusic	4/5 stars

My Secret Life is the third album by Sonia Dada. It was released in 1998 on Capricorn Records.

== Production ==
The album was produced by Barry Beckett and Dan Pritzker. Vocalist Shawn Christopher joined the band for My Secret Life.

== Critical reception ==
The Washington Post deemed the album "gospel-soul vocals and roots-rock grooves applied to album-rock songwriting." The Chicago Tribune thought that "from the New Orleans swagger of 'Zachary' to the fatback funk of 'Phases of the Moon', the sinuous rocker 'Cold' and the breezy 'Paradise', their peerless solo and group vocals seamlessly stitch together the group's disparate elements." The Wisconsin State Journal called the band's sound "an eclectic musical hybrid that's a refreshing antidote to whitebread alternative rock."

AllMusic wrote: "While their music has always been delightfully eclectic, this is the album where they finally pull all their disparate sounds and styles together and make something entirely their own out of their mutual sources."

== Track listing ==
1. "Zachary" - 3:59
2. "Things Change" - 5:13
3. "Ain't Life For The Living" - 3:03
4. "Don't Go (Giving Your Love Away)" - 3:42
5. "Phases Of The Moon" - 4:47
6. "Green Eyed Esther" - 5:51
7. "Get To You" - 2:43
8. "Las Vegas Virgin" - 3:43
9. "I'm Gone" - 4:03
10. "Cold" - 4:23
11. "So Sad" - 4:00
12. "You Don't Love Me Anymore" - 4:22
13. "Morning Comes" - 4:26
14. "Would I Lie To You" - 4:41
15. "Paradise" - 5:10
