= You Don't Treat Me No Good =

1992 single by Sonia Dada

- Australian and New Zealand artwork

Single by Sonia Dada

from the album Sonia Dada
- B-side: "Deliver Me (Slight Return)"
- Released: October 12, 1992
- Length: 4:09
- Label: Chameleon; Festival
- Songwriter: Dan Pritzker
- Producers: Daniel Laszlo; Dan Pritzker

Sonia Dada singles chronology
"You Don't Treat Me No Good" (1992)	"You Ain't Thinking (About Me)" (1993)

Alternative cover
- Artwork used for the 2000 US re-release

"You Don't Treat Me No Good" (also known as "(Lover) You Don't Treat Me No Good") is a song by American soul group Sonia Dada. Released in 1992 as the group's debut single outside the United States, the song became an unexpected hit in Australasia, reaching number two in New Zealand and topping Australia's ARIA Singles Chart for four weeks, ending 1993 as the country's third-best-selling hit. Eighteen years later, country music singer Jerrod Niemann released a cover version under the title "Lover, Lover", and his version reached number one on the US Hot Country Songs chart.

== History ==
Glenn A. Baker of Billboard magazine described the song's chart success as "the most unexpected and honestly surprising breakout in the Australian market for many years." He also cited the song as an example of the label's success with breaking new acts outside their home markets. X102 and SAFM in Adelaide were among the first stations to play the song, and it rapidly spread to other stations owned by Austereo Network. In the United States, the single was released in January 1993; seven years later, in March 2000, it was re-serviced to hot and modern adult contemporary radio under the title "(Lover) You Don't Treat Me No Good".

== Critical reception ==
Joe Rassenfoss of the Rocky Mountain News, in his review of the album, called the song a "catchy vocal entreaty."

== Chart performance ==
"You Don't Treat Me No Good" debuted at number 38 on the Australian ARIA Charts on November 29, 1992. After spending six weeks at the number-two position behind Whitney Houston's version of "I Will Always Love You", the song reached its peak of number one on February 28, 1993. It held that position for four weeks, then fell to number four on March 28. It was ranked number three on the ARIA year-end chart. In neighboring New Zealand, the song debuted at number 47 on November 29, 1992, then reached its peak of number two on January 17, unable to dethrone "I Will Always Love You" from the top spot for five weeks. It remained in the top 40 for 11 more weeks and ended the year as New Zealand's 27th-best-selling single. Although the song did not chart in the United States, the self-titled album from which it was taken sold more than 100,000 copies after its 1992 release.

== Track listings ==
US cassette single

1. "You Don't Treat Me No Good" – 4:08
2. "You Don't Treat Me No Good" (Ebersold/Paige remix) – 3:25

Australian and New Zealand CD and cassette single

1. "You Don't Treat Me No Good"
2. "Deliver Me (Slight Return)"

== Charts ==
=== Weekly charts ===
Chart (1993)	Peak position
Australia (ARIA)	1
New Zealand (Recorded Music NZ)	2

=== Year-end charts ===
Chart (1993)	Position
Australia (ARIA)	3
New Zealand (RIANZ)	27

== Certifications ==
Region	Certification	Certified units/sales
Australia (ARIA)	3× Platinum	210,000^{^}
New Zealand (RMNZ)	Gold	5,000^{*}
^{*} Sales figures based on certification alone.^{^} Shipments figures based on certification alone.

== Release history ==
Region	Date	Format(s)	Label(s)	Ref.
Australia	October 12, 1992	CD; cassette	Chameleon; Festival	
United States	January 1993	Cassette	Chameleon	
United States	March 6, 2000	Triple-A radio	Calliope	
United States	March 27, 2000	Hot adult contemporary; modern adult contemporary radio	Calliope	

== Jerrod Niemann version ==
"Lover, Lover"

Single by Jerrod Niemann

from the album Judge Jerrod & the Hung Jury
- Released: March 1, 2010
- Genre: Country
- Length: 3:13
- Label: Sea Gayle; Arista Nashville
- Songwriter: Dan Pritzker
- Producers: Dave Brainard; Jerrod Niemann

Jerrod Niemann singles chronology
"The One That Got Away" (2007)	"Lover, Lover" (2010)	"What Do You Want" (2010)

On March 1, 2010, American country music artist Jerrod Niemann released a cover version of this song under the title "Lover, Lover". It was Niemann's first release on the Sea Gayle label, a sister label of Arista Nashville, as well as his fourth single release overall. It is included on his album Judge Jerrod & the Hung Jury, which was released in July 2010.

=== History ===
Niemann's recording of the song features nine vocal tracks, all of which he recorded himself and then overdubbed. He recorded eight of the vocal tracks in one day and recorded the bass backing vocals the next day. Niemann once explained that his voice was hoarse from recording the eight vocal parts and was unable to record the bass vocal. He and a friend then visited the Nashville tavern Tin Roof, which is near the studio where the song was recorded, after Niemann recalled upon several occasions where the Tin Roof bartender would serve Niemann excessive doses of whiskey resulting in Niemann awakening in the morning after with an extremely low voice. Thus Niemann "medicated" his vocal cords by having the Tin Roof bartender serve him Jack Daniels whiskey nonstop for approximately six hours that night, returning to the studio the next morning to record the bass vocal.

=== Content ===
The main riff.

The song is in the key of G Major, at a moderate tempo, based around a two-measure riff played on acoustic guitar. No full chords are played in the song, although the second measure of the riff includes an open fifth consisting of C and G.

=== Critical reception ===
Writing for the CMT blog, Whitney Self said that Niemann "gives the tune a new feel with his contagious beats and acoustic guitar." Bobby Peacock of Roughstock called it "soulful, catchy and distinctive," giving it a four-star rating out of five.

=== Music video ===
Potsy Ponciroli directed the music video, which features Niemann playing guitar while singing the song on a porch. It was filmed in Nashville, Tennessee. Jamey Johnson and Randy Houser make cameos at the end.

=== Chart performance ===
"Lover, Lover" debuted at number 52 on the Billboard Hot Country Songs chart for the week ending March 6, 2010. On the week of August 14, 2010, it became his first number one. It peaked at number 29 on the Billboard Hot 100 and at number 100 on its year-end chart; it was number 22 on the Hot Country Songs year-end chart.

==== Weekly charts ====
Chart (2010)	Peak position
Canada Hot 100 (Billboard)	49
US Billboard Hot 100	29
US Hot Country Songs (Billboard)	1

==== Year-end charts ====
Chart (2010)	Position
US Billboard Hot 100	100
US Hot Country Songs (Billboard)	22
