= Dave Brainard =

American producer (born 1975)

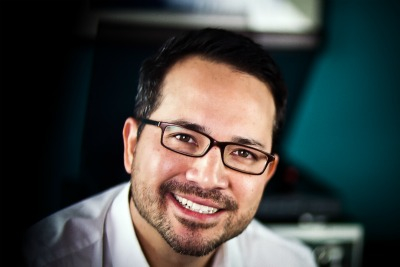

Background information
- Born: David Gregory Brainard; February 9, 1975 (age 51)
- Origin: Omaha, Nebraska, United States
- Genres: Country, Americana
- Occupations: Record producer, musician, songwriter, recording engineer
- Instruments: Acoustic guitar, electric guitar, bass guitar
- Years active: 1999–present=

David Gregory Brainard (born February 9, 1975) is a Grammy-nominated American record producer best known for his work in country music in the entertainment industry.

== Early life ==
Dave Brainard was born in Seoul, Korea and raised in Omaha, Nebraska, the second of four children born to Greg Brainard, a retired Air Force Master Sergeant, and South Korean immigrant, So Un Jo. He graduated from Papillion-La Vista High School in 1993 and went on to attend University of Nebraska Omaha for 1 year. Afterwards, Brainard served 5 years in the United States Air Force Band stationed at Offutt AFB in Omaha, NE, before moving to Nashville, Tennessee in 1999.

== Early career ==
In 2001 Dave Brainard began his publishing career writing songs for Balmur Corus Music. Afterwards, Brainard wrote for Bigger Picture Music Group formerly Big Picture Music Group. In that time, Brainard wrote songs for Neal McCoy, Sammy Kershaw, Kelly Coffee, Ricochet, Tebey Ottoh, and Brooks & Dunn. During this time, Brainard went on radio tours, playing on the road with artists such as Rebecca Lynn Howard, Anthony Smith, Marcel, David Nail, and Jessica Andrews.

Brainard began recording Music Row demos for other contemporary songwriters, such as Chris Tompkins, Dierks Bentley, Craig Monday, Chris Wallin, Anthony Smith and produced Jamey Johnson's self-released debut album "They Call Me Country". Dave Brainard is a self-taught music producer known for his multi-instrumental ability and creativity.

== deciBel Productions ==
In 2006, Dave Brainard founded deciBel Productions LLC. Brainard founded Mix Dream Studios with engineer Brian Kolb at that time and the two businesses partner to perform artist development services. Designed as a studio and executive office, Mix Dream Studios has produced and collaborated with much of the Nashville creative community.

=== Jerrod Niemann ===
In 2008, friend musician Jerrod Niemann sought production services from Dave Brainard to produce record "Judge Jerrod & the Hung Jury". The album was signed by Joe Galante to Arista Nashville as a completed work and went on to debut at No. 1 on the country albums chart.

Niemann experienced No. 1 single success with "Lover Lover", which went on to sell Platinum in digital single sales. “Judge Jerrod & the Hung Jury” went on to yield another top 5, Gold selling “What Do You Want”, and a top 20 in “Drinkin’ Song”.

=== Brandy Clark ===
In 2011, Dave Brainard and deciBel Nashville produced highly acclaimed album “Twelve Stories” with Brandy Clark. "Twelve Stories" would go on to receive a Metacritic score of ‘universal praise’ and national critics (Rolling Stone, SPIN Magazine, NY Magazine) have recognized “Twelve Stories” as “one of the Best Country Albums released in 2013.”

In 2014, Brandy Clark was announced as an opener for Eric Church's "Outsiders World Tour". Brandy Clark was also nominated as New Artist of the Year by the Country Music Association in 2014.

=== Ray Scott ===
American country singer-songwriter Ray Scott had independent success on Sirius XM's The Highway with his Dave Brainard produced hit "Those Jeans"(2012).

Brainard and Ray Scott collaborated on the production and promotion of Ray Scott's 2014 record "Ray Scott". "Ray Scott" has received positive international review.

== Personal life ==
In September 2015, Brainard was hospitalized after being found unconscious with a broken jaw and missing teeth following an attack by an unknown assailant on Demonbreun Street in Nashville.

== Production discography ==
Year	Artist	Album
2002	Jamey Johnson	They Call Me Country
2007	Western Underground	Unbridled
2010	Jerrod Niemann	Judge Jerrod & the Hung Jury
2012	Ray Scott	Rayality
2012	Jerrod Niemann	Free the Music
2013	Brandy Clark	12 Stories
2014	Ray Scott	Ray Scott
2016	Jamie Kent	All American Mutt
2017	Sunny Sweeney	Trophy
