= Sea Gayle Music =

Independent music publishing company based in Nashville, Tennessee, US

- Parent company: Sea Gayle INC
- Founded: 1999; 26 years ago
- Country of origin: United States
- Location: Nashville, Tennessee
- Official website: www.seagayle.com

Sea Gayle Music is an independent music publishing company based in Nashville, Tennessee in the United States. It was formed in 1999 by songwriter Chris DuBois, songwriter/producer Frank Rogers, and songwriter/artist Brad Paisley. In 2010 and 2011, Sea Gayle Music was named ASCAP Country Publisher of the Year. This was the first time since 1982 that an independent music publishing company has won this award.

== Current writers ==
- Barrett Baber
- Ian Christian
- Adam Craig
- Chris DuBois
- Claire Ernst
- Jordan Fletcher
- Jordan Gray
- Lynn Hutton
- Braden Jamison
- Zach Kale
- Wolf Mahler
- Cam Newby
- Brad Paisley
- Madison Parks
- Jenna Paulette
- Avery Roberson
- Maggie Rose
- Brett Sheroky
- Josh Weathers

== Past writers ==
- Smith Ahnquist
- Brent Anderson
- Ingrid Andress
- Wade Bowen
- Jim Brown
- Jordan Brooker
- Richie Brown
- Byron "Mr. Talkbox" Chambers
- Brandy Clark
- Larry Cordle
- Clint Daniels
- Radney Foster
- Jeb Gipson
- Liz Hengber
- Carolyn Dawn Johnson
- Jay Knowles
- Clint Lagerberg
- Leaving Austin
- Jesse Lee
- Kelley Lovelace
- Tim Menzies
- Jaden Michaels
- Lee Thomas Miller
- Clay Mills
- Jake Mitchell
- Jerrod Niemann
- Tim Owens
- Bobby Pinson
- Frank Rogers
- Brent Rupard
- Mike Ryan
- Don Sampson
- Don Schlitz
- Steve Schnur
- Jordyn Shellhart
- Bryan Simpson
- CJ Solar
- Chris Stapleton
- Dave Turnbull
- Trent Willmon
- Baylor Wilson

== Charting singles ==
=== Number one songs ===
Year	Song	Artist	Peak chart positions	
Year	Song	Artist	US Country	R&R / Aircheck
2025	Friends Like That	John Morgan ft Jason Aldean	#2	#1
2024	Where The Wild Things Are	Luke Combs	#3	#1
2024	White Horse	Chris Stapleton	#2	#1
2022	You Should Probably Leave	Chris Stapleton	#1	#1
2020	One Beer	HARDY	#1	#1
2020	Some Girls	Jameson Rodgers	#1	#1
2020	In Between	Scotty McCreery	#1	#1
2020	Homemade	Jake Owen	#1	#1
2019	Rearview Town	Jason Aldean	#1	#1
2019	Some of It	Eric Church	#1	#1
2019	Burning Man	Dierks Bentley ft. Brothers Osborne	#2	#1
2018	Up Down	Morgan Wallen ft. FGL	#1	#1
2018	Broken Halos	Chris Stapleton	#1	#1
2018	Five More Minutes	Scotty McCreery	#1	#1
2017	Fix a Drink	Chris Janson	#2	#1
2017	Today	Brad Paisley	#3	#1
2017	A Guy with a Girl	Blake Shelton	#1	#1
2017	Blue Ain't Your Color	Keith Urban	#1	#1
2016	Backroad Song	Granger Smith	#1	#1
2015	Buy Me a Boat	Chris Janson	#3	#1
2015	Lonely Tonight	Blake Shelton f/Ashley Monroe	#1	#1
2015	Perfect Storm	Brad Paisley	#1	#1
2014	Yeah	Joe Nichols	#1	#1
2014	Drink A Beer	Luke Bryan	#1	#1
2013	Southern Girl	Tim McGraw	#2	#1
2013	Runnin' Outta Moonlight	Randy Houser	#3	#1
2013	Beat This Summer	Brad Paisley	#2	#1
2013	Southern Comfort Zone	Brad Paisley	#2	#1
2012	Love's Gonna Make It Alright	George Strait	#3	#1
2011	Remind Me	Brad Paisley	#1	#1
2011	Old Alabama	Brad Paisley	#1	#1
2011	This	Darius Rucker	#1	#1
2010	Anything Like Me	Brad Paisley	#1	#1
2010	Come Back Song	Darius Rucker	#1	#1
2010	Water	Brad Paisley	#1	#1
2010	American Saturday Night	Brad Paisley	#2	#1
2009	Welcome to the Future	Brad Paisley	#2	#1
2009	Alright	Darius Rucker	#1	#1
2009	Then	Brad Paisley	#1	#1
2009	It Won't Be Like This For Long	Darius Rucker	#1	#1
2008	Waitin’ On A Woman	Brad Paisley	#1	#1
2008	Back When I Knew It All	Montgomery Gentry	#1	#1
2008	I'm Still A Guy	Brad Paisley	#1	#1
2008	You're Gonna Miss This	Trace Adkins	#1	#1
2008	Letter To Me	Brad Paisley	#1	#1
2007	Online	Brad Paisley	#1	#1
2007	Never Wanted Nothing More	Kenny Chesney	#1	#1
2007	Lucky Man	Montgomery Gentry	#1	#1
2007	Ticks	Brad Paisley	#1	#1
2007	She's Everything	Brad Paisley	#1	#1
2006	The World	Brad Paisley	#1	#1
2006	Your Man	Josh Turner	#1	#1
2005	Good Ride Cowboy	Garth Brooks	#3	#1
2005	Mud On The Tires	Brad Paisley	#1	#3
2003	Tough Little Boys	Gary Allan	#1	#1
2003	It's Five O'Clock Somewhere	Alan Jackson with Jimmy Buffett	#1	#1
2003	19 Somethin'	Mark Wills	#1	#1
2002	I'm Gonna Miss Her	Brad Paisley	#1	#1
2000	We Danced	Brad Paisley	#1	#1
1999	He Didn't Have To Be	Brad Paisley	#1	#1

=== Other hits ===
Year	Song	Artist	Peak chart positions	
Year	Song	Artist	US Country	R&R / Aircheck
2022	Up	Jon Pardi	#21	#19
2018	She Ain't In It	Jon Pardi	#21	#20
2017	Last Time for Everything	Brad Paisley	#19	#18
2016	Without a Fight	Brad Paisley	#16	#14
2016	Nobody to Blame	Chris Stapleton	#10	#10
2016	Country Nation	Brad Paisley	#12	#10
2015	Crushin' It	Brad Paisley	#9	#7
2014	Feelin' It	Scotty McCreery	#10	#10
2014	People Loving People	Garth Brooks	#19	#20
2014	Cold One	Eric Church	#20	#19
2014	River Bank	Brad Paisley	#2	#2
2014	The Mona Lisa	Brad Paisley	#19	#18
2013	Easy	Sheryl Crow	#17	#17
2013	Crying On A Suitcase	Casey James	#14	#14
2012	Did It For The Girl	Greg Bates	#5	#5
2012	Shinin' On Me	Jerrod Neimann	#17	#16
2012	Something To Do With My Hands	Thomas Rhett	#15	#15
2012	Better Than I Used To Be	Tim McGraw	#5	#5
2012	Camouflage	Brad Paisley	#15	#14
2011	One More Drinkin' Song	Jerrod Niemann	#13	#13
2011	This Is Country Music	Brad Paisley	#2	#2
2011	What Do You Want	Jerrod Niemann	#4	#4
2010	This Ain't Nothin'	Craig Morgan	#13	#13
2010	Keep On Lovin' You	Steel Magnolia	#4	#4
2010	History In The Making	Darius Rucker	#3	#3
2009	Nothin' To Die For	Tim McGraw	#5	#5
2009	Marry For Money	Trace Adkins	#14	#14
2009	In Color	Jamey Johnson	#9	#9
2008	Another Try	Josh Turner (feat. Trisha Yearwood)	#15	#15
2007	The More I Drink	Blake Shelton	#19	#19
2006	Love You	Jack Ingram	#12	#12
2006	Swing	Trace Adkins	#20	#20
2005	Alcohol	Brad Paisley	#4	#4
2005	Arlington	Trace Adkins	#16	#15
2005	If Something Should Happen	Darryl Worley	#9	#9
2005	What's A Guy Gotta Do	Joe Nichols	#4	#3
2004	Little Moments	Brad Paisley	#2	#3
2004	I Love You This Much	Jimmy Wayne	#6	#6
2003	Celebrity	Brad Paisley	#3	#3
2003	I Wish You'd Stay	Brad Paisley	#7	#8
2002	Wrapped Around	Brad Paisley	#2	#2
2001	Two People Fell in Love	Brad Paisley	#4	#4
2000	Me Neither	Brad Paisley	#18	#16
1999	Who Needs Pictures	Brad Paisley	#12	#10
1997	Another You	David Kersh	#3	#2

== Awards ==
- 2000 MusicRow Song of the Year – "He Didn’t Have To Be" by Brad Paisley
- 2004 Grammy Award for Best Country Song – "It's Five O’Clock Somewhere" by Alan Jackson with Jimmy Buffett
- 2004 ASCAP Country Song of the Year - "It's Five O'Clock Somewhere" by Alan Jackson with Jimmy Buffett
- 2008 MusicRow Song of the Year – “Letter To Me” by Brad Paisley
- 2008 Academy of Country Music Song of the Year – "In Color" by Jamey Johnson
- 2009 Country Music Association Song of the Year – "In Color" by Jamey Johnson
- 2009 MusicRow Song of the Year – "In Color" by Jamey Johnson
- 2009 NSAI Country Song of the Year – "Waitin' On A Woman" by Brad Paisley
- 2010 ASCAP Country Publisher of the Year
- 2011 ASCAP Country Publisher of the Year
