= What would Jesus do? =

Phrase popular in the 1990s in the United States

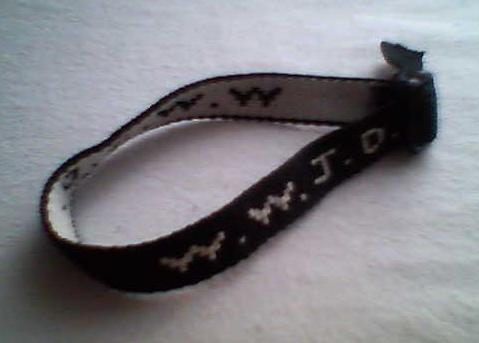
A W.W.J.D. bracelet

The phrase "What would Jesus do?", often abbreviated to WWJD, became particularly popular in the United States in the early 1900s, following the 1896 novel In His Steps: What Would Jesus Do? by Charles Sheldon. The phrase saw a resurgence in the 1990s as a personal motto for Christians, who used it as a reminder of their belief in the moral imperative in a way that demonstrated the love of Jesus through their actions. The resurgence of the motto in the 1990s stemmed from the WWJD abbreviation on wristbands that became popular among Christian youth groups.

== History ==
=== Theological background ===
The concept is based on the Epistle to the Galatians chapter 2 verse 20, where Paul of Tarsus says that Christ lives in Christians and was developed with the doctrine of "Imitatio Christi" (imitation of Christ) by Augustine of Hippo in 400.

The Roman Catholic Church emphasizes the concept of Imitatio Christi (imitation of Christ), which is summarized in the English phrase "What Would Jesus Do?"

=== Earliest use of the phrase ===
Charles Spurgeon, a well-known evangelical Baptist preacher in London, used the phrase "what would Jesus do" in quotation marks several times in a sermon he gave on June 28, 1891. In his sermon he cites the source of the phrase as a book written in Latin by Thomas à Kempis between 1418 and 1427, Imitatio Christi (The Imitation of Christ).

The Rev. A.B. Simpson, founder of the Christian and Missionary Alliance Church, wrote both the lyrics and music of a Gospel Hymn "What Would Jesus Do" with a copyright date of 1891. It can be found at #669 in Hymns of the Christian Life.

=== 1896 novel ===
Charles Sheldon's 1896 book In His Steps was subtitled "What Would Jesus Do?" Sheldon's novel grew out of a series of sermons he delivered in his Congregationalist church in Topeka, Kansas. Unlike the previous nuances mentioned above, Sheldon's theology was shaped by a commitment to Christian socialism. The ethos of Sheldon's approach to the Christian life was expressed in this phrase "What Would Jesus Do", with Jesus being a moral example as well as a Saviour figure. Sheldon's ideas coalesced with those that formed into the Social Gospel espoused by Walter Rauschenbusch. Indeed, Rauschenbusch acknowledged that his Social Gospel owed its inspiration directly to Sheldon's novel, and Sheldon himself identified his own theology with the Social Gospel.

Due to a mistake by the original publisher, the copyright for Sheldon's novel was never established and multiple publishers were able to print and sell the novel. This caused the novel to be easily affordable and it sold 30 million copies worldwide, making it one of the top 50 bestselling novels ever.

In this popular novel (it had been translated into 21 languages by 1935), Rev. Henry Maxwell encounters a homeless man who challenges him to take seriously the imitation of Christ. The homeless man has difficulty understanding why, in his view, so many Christians ignore the poor:

I heard some people singing at a church prayer meeting the other night,

"All for Jesus, all for Jesus,
All my being's ransomed powers,
All my thoughts, and all my doings,
All my days, and all my hours."

and I kept wondering as I sat on the steps outside just what they meant by it. It seems to me there's an awful lot of trouble in the world that somehow wouldn't exist if all the people who sing such songs went and lived them out. I suppose I don't understand. But what would Jesus do? Is that what you mean by following His steps? It seems to me sometimes as if the people in the big churches had good clothes and nice houses to live in, and money to spend for luxuries, and could go away on summer vacations and all that, while the people outside the churches, thousands of them, I mean, die in tenements, and walk the streets for jobs, and never have a piano or a picture in the house, and grow up in misery and drunkenness and sin."

This leads to many of the novel's characters asking, "What would Jesus do?" when faced with decisions of some importance. This has the effect of making the characters embrace Christianity more seriously and to focus on what they see as its core – the life of Christ.

In 1993, Garrett W. Sheldon (great-grandson of the original author) and Deborah Morris published What Would Jesus Do? : a contemporary retelling of Charles M. Sheldon's classic In His Steps. Garrett Sheldon states that his updated version "is based on many actual events in the lives of believers."

It is possible that Sheldon was familiar with either Spurgeon or Thomas, or that he was independently inspired.

=== 1990s ===
At Calvary Reformed Church, in Holland, Michigan, a youth group leader named Janie Tinklenberg began a grassroots movement to help the teenagers in her group remember the phrase; it spread worldwide in the 1990s among Christian youth, who wore bracelets bearing the initials WWJD. Later, a sequel bracelet was generated with the initials "FROG," to provide an answer to "WWJD." FROG was an acronym for "Fully Rely On God."

=== 2000s ===
In 2005, Garry Wills wrote "What Jesus Meant", in which he examined "What Would Jesus Really Do" (also a book review in Esquire Magazine).

=== 2010s ===
A trio of films were released under the WWJD moniker. The first, starring John Schneider and Adam Gregory, was released in 2010. The 2012 film The Woodcarver used the moniker WWJD II, with similar themes but different characters. Schneider returned for the 2015 film, subtitled The Journey Continues.

== Snowclones ==
The expression has become a snowclone with the promotion of phrases such as "What would Lincoln do?", "What would Reagan do?", and "What Would Brian Boitano Do?"

== See also ==
- Christian ethics
- Choose the right
- Jesusism
- The Law of Christ
- Ministry of Jesus
- Sermon on the Mount
