= Crazy Days =

Crazy Days may refer to:

- "Crazy Days" (song), a 2008 song by Adam Gregory
- Crazy Days (album), a 2009 album by Adam Gregory
- Crazy Days (film), a 1977 Croatian film
