= In His Steps (1936 film) =

1936 film

- Directed by: Karl Brown
- Written by: Karl Brown; Hinton Smith
- Based on: In His Steps by Charles Sheldon
- Produced by: B.F. Zeidman
- Starring: Eric Linden; Cecilia Parker; Harry Beresford
- Cinematography: Harry Jackson
- Edited by: Duncan Mansfield; Edward Schroeder
- Music by: Abe Meyer
- Production company: B.F. Zeidman Productions
- Distributed by: Grand National Pictures
- Release date: September 22, 1936
- Running time: 79 minutes
- Country: United States
- Language: English

In His Steps is a 1936 American drama film directed by Karl Brown and starring Eric Linden, Cecilia Parker and Harry Beresford. It was distributed by the recently formed Grand National Pictures. The film's sets were designed by the art director Edward C. Jewell. It was based on the 1896 novel In His Steps by Charles Sheldon, which had previously been adapted into the silent film The Martyrdom of Philip Strong.

== Cast ==
- Eric Linden as Tom Carver
- Cecilia Parker as Ruth Brewster
- Harry Beresford as Davidson
- Clara Blandick as Martha Adams
- Roger Imhof as Adams
- Olive Tell as Elaine Brewster
- Henry Kolker as Calvin Carver
- Charles Richman as Robert Brewster
- Robert Warwick asJudge Grey
- Warner Richmond as Gavin
- Stanley Andrews as Broderick
- Donald Kirke as Reynard
- Torben Meyer as Psychiatrist

== Bibliography ==
- Fetrow, Alan G. . Sound films, 1927-1939: a United States Filmography. McFarland, 1992.
- Goble, Alan. The Complete Index to Literary Sources in Film. Walter de Gruyter, 1999.
- Hanson, Patricia King . The American Film Institute Catalog of Motion Pictures Produced in the United States: Feature Films, 1931-1940, Volumes 1-3. University of California Press, 1993.
