= In His Steps (1964 film) =

- DVD cover
- Directed by: Ken Anderson
- Written by: Ken Anderson
- Based on: In His Steps by Charles Sheldon
- Produced by: S. Lambert Huffman
- Starring: Alma Du Bus; Harry Elders; Art Hern; Cheryl Lee Morrison
- Cinematography: Dan Dunkelberger
- Music by: Ray Robinson
- Release date: 1964
- Country: United States
- Language: English

In His Steps is a 1964 Christian film based on the novel of the same name by Charles Sheldon, written and directed by Ken Anderson.
