= Opry Band =

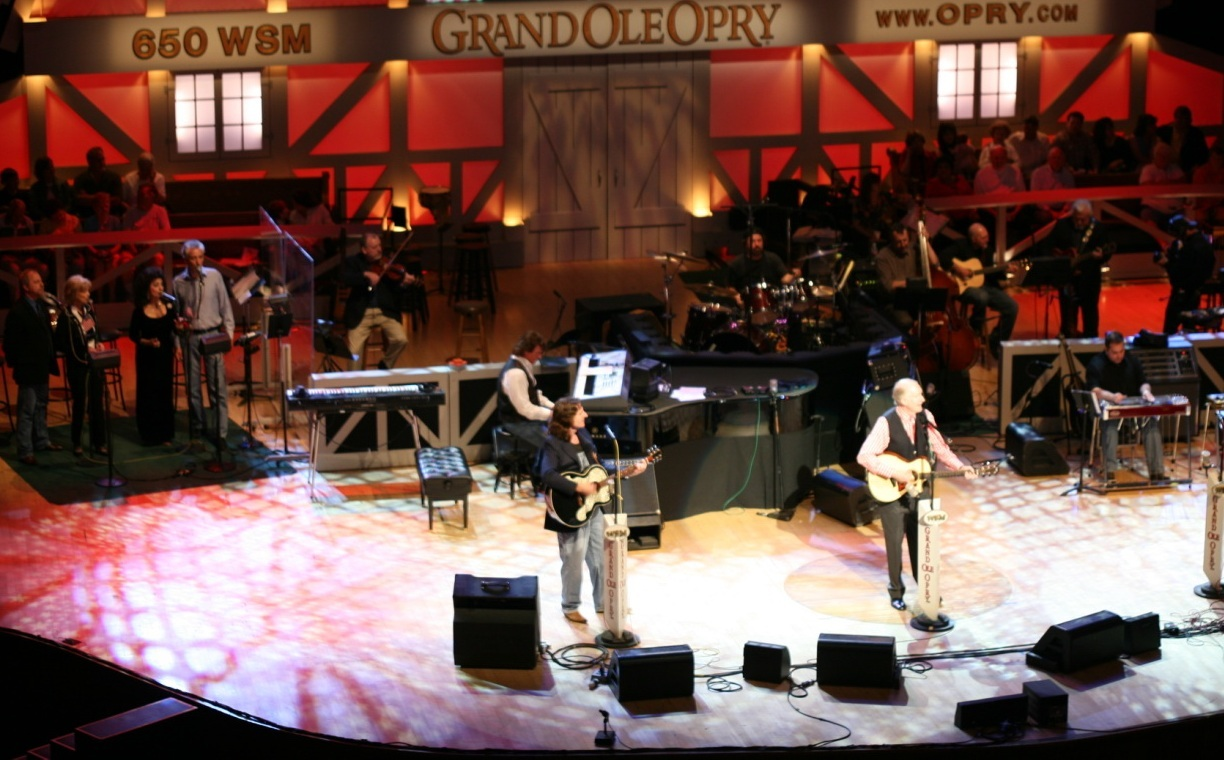
- The Opry Band backing George Hamilton IV in 2007

Background information
- Also known as: Grand Ole Opry Band; Opry Staff Band
- Origin: Nashville, Tennessee, U.S.
- Genres: Country
- Years active: c. 1940–present
- Label: n/a
- Members: Kerry Marx, director Eddie Bayers; Mark Beckett; Rod Fletcher; Randy Hart; Eamon McLoughlin; Mike Noble; Danny Parks; Larry Paxton; Tommy White; Tony King; Kim Keyes; Marty Slayton; Mica Roberts; Tania Hancheroff
- Past members: Jimmy Capps; Hoot Hester; Spider Wilson; Billy Linneman; Tim Atwood; Clarence "Mac" McGarr; John Gardner; Joe Edwards; Harold Weakley; Glen Davis; Sonny Burnette; Weldon Myrick; Ralph Davis
- Website: www.opry.com

The Opry Band (also known as the Grand Ole Opry Band, or Opry Staff Band) is the house band of the Grand Ole Opry, the long-running country music stage concert and radio broadcast based in Nashville, Tennessee.

Members rotate in and out of the band over time, but some have stayed with the band for durations as long as fifty years, with the band having experienced periods of fifteen years or more without any changes in membership.

== Purpose and methodology ==
The band provides musical accompaniment for performers appearing on the Opry, including guest artists who may not be traveling with their own musicians, or who may need instrumentation in addition to that provided by their band.

Each week, often without rehearsal, the band accompanies a wide range of country music performers, "tootling, thumping and plucking away with an ease that belies the difficulty of their jobs". Members of the band typically prepare by drafting chord charts based on anticipated setlists, though performances are frequently carried out with minimal preparation. The band generally performs one song per 30-minute Opry segment. The band operates as part of a broader performance ensemble that includes dancers and other supporting performers.

While usually playing at the facilities of the Grand Ole Opry, on rare occasions, the band has made appearances at other venues, performing for example at Natural Bridge State Park in 1981.

== History ==
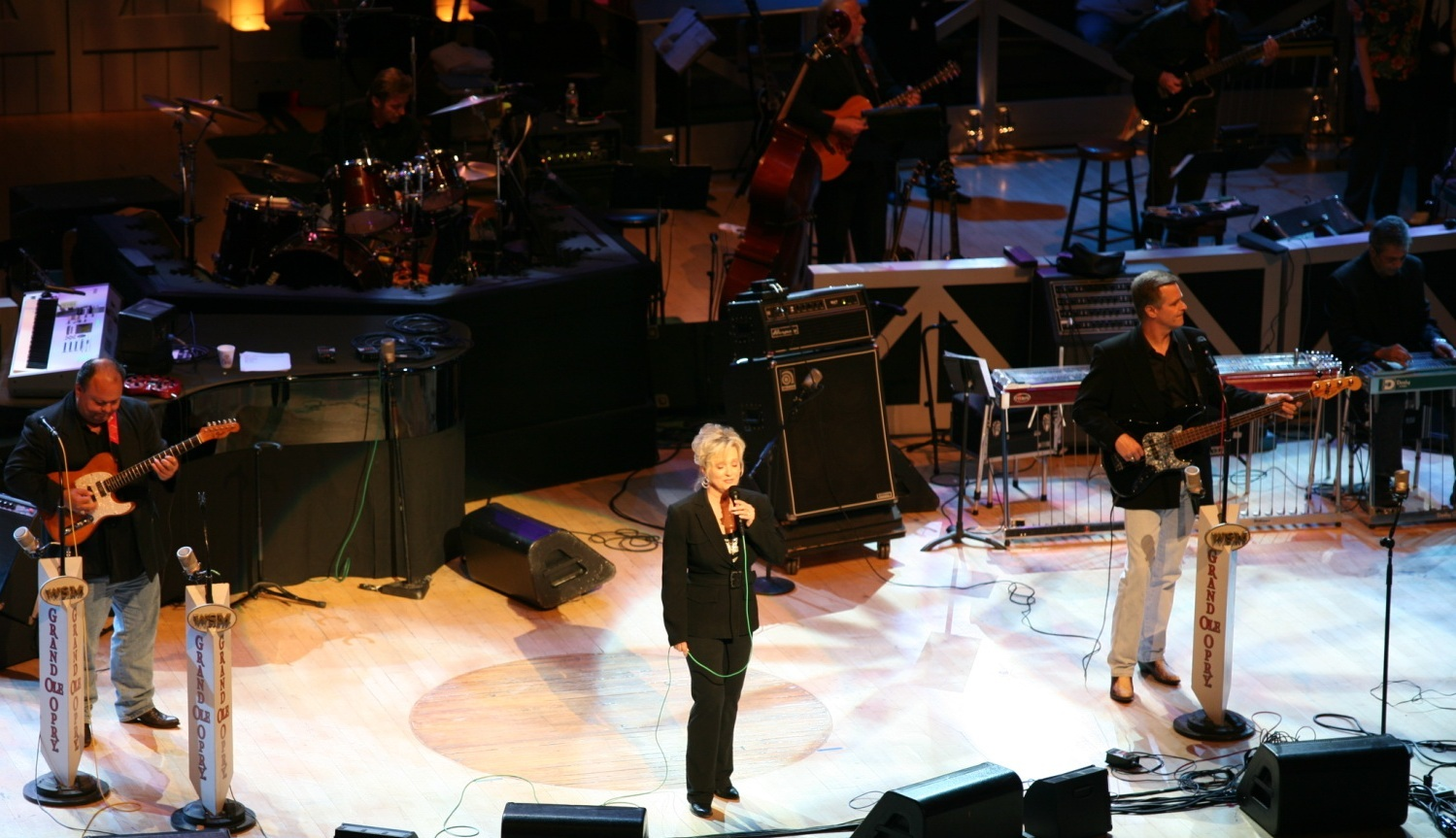
Members of the Opry Band backing Connie Smith in 2007

While the history of the Grand Ole Opry sets its date of establishment in 1925, the formation of its house band is not well-documented. By at least as early as 1940, it was reported that Grand Ole Opry member Roy Acuff, "whose 'Grand Ole Opry' band has entertained with hill billy music at each rally this week", was appearing in support of the presidential campaign of Wendell Willkie. Clarence "Mac" McGarr, previously of The Missouri Mountaineers, began as the fiddler for the band by 1941, and became the bandleader later in the 1940s.

By 1980, the Opry staff band consisted of approximately 15 musicians. At that time, fiddler Joe Edwards said: "The Opry staff band job is one of the best musical jobs in the world because it pays well and it's consistent". The band released an album in 1980, The Grand Ole Opry Staff Band And Carol Lee Singers, followed by another album in 1983 titled, Showtime, both on the now-defunct Woodsmoke Records label. A 1981 article noted that at that time, the group had "been together for more than 15 years without a single personnel change conceivably a record for a country music band". In 1986, the Academy of Country Music named them "band of the year", and they were nominated for a Country Music Association award as "instrumental group of the year".

In 2000, amid concerns about declining participation by high-profile Opry members, newly promoted Grand Ole Opry director Pete Fisher restructured the band, dismissing five members, and bringing in new musicians including fiddler Hoot Hester, guitarist Kerry Marx, and drummer John Gardner. The renewed lineup was well-received, with a 2001 review of the Grand Ole Opry house band noted that "pianist Tim Atwood and guitarist Kerry Marx play with rare taste, feel, and soul". Gardner noted that the band must often adapt quickly to artists who may change their setlists immediately before taking the stage, requiring the musicians to "wing it" in live performance. By 2000, the band had for decades regularly performed with the Carol Lee Singers, who provided harmonies and background vocals. The band has included a number of prominent Nashville session musicians. At the time of the 2000 Billboard article, members included bandleader and guitarist Jimmy Capps, along with musicians such as Spider Wilson (guitar), Kerry Marx (guitar), Billy Linneman (bass), and Tim Atwood (piano and host). Wilson left the band in November 2006, "alleging that he was consistently excluded from playing on the televised portion of the show". In 2010, the Opry had an "I'm With The Band" series, to "invite celebrities who don't normally perform country music to sit in with the Grand Ole Opry band", with early participants including Kevin Costner and Kimberly Williams-Paisley.

In 2018, Marx became the musical director of the band, and on December 21 of that year, the band's rehearsal space was renamed in honor of Capps, in honor of his being "the longest-tenured member of the Opry band, who first appeared on The Opry in 1958".

== See also ==
- The Nashville A-Team, session musicians with some historic overlap with Opry Band members
