= Adam Gregory (singer) =

Canadian singer-songwriter and actor

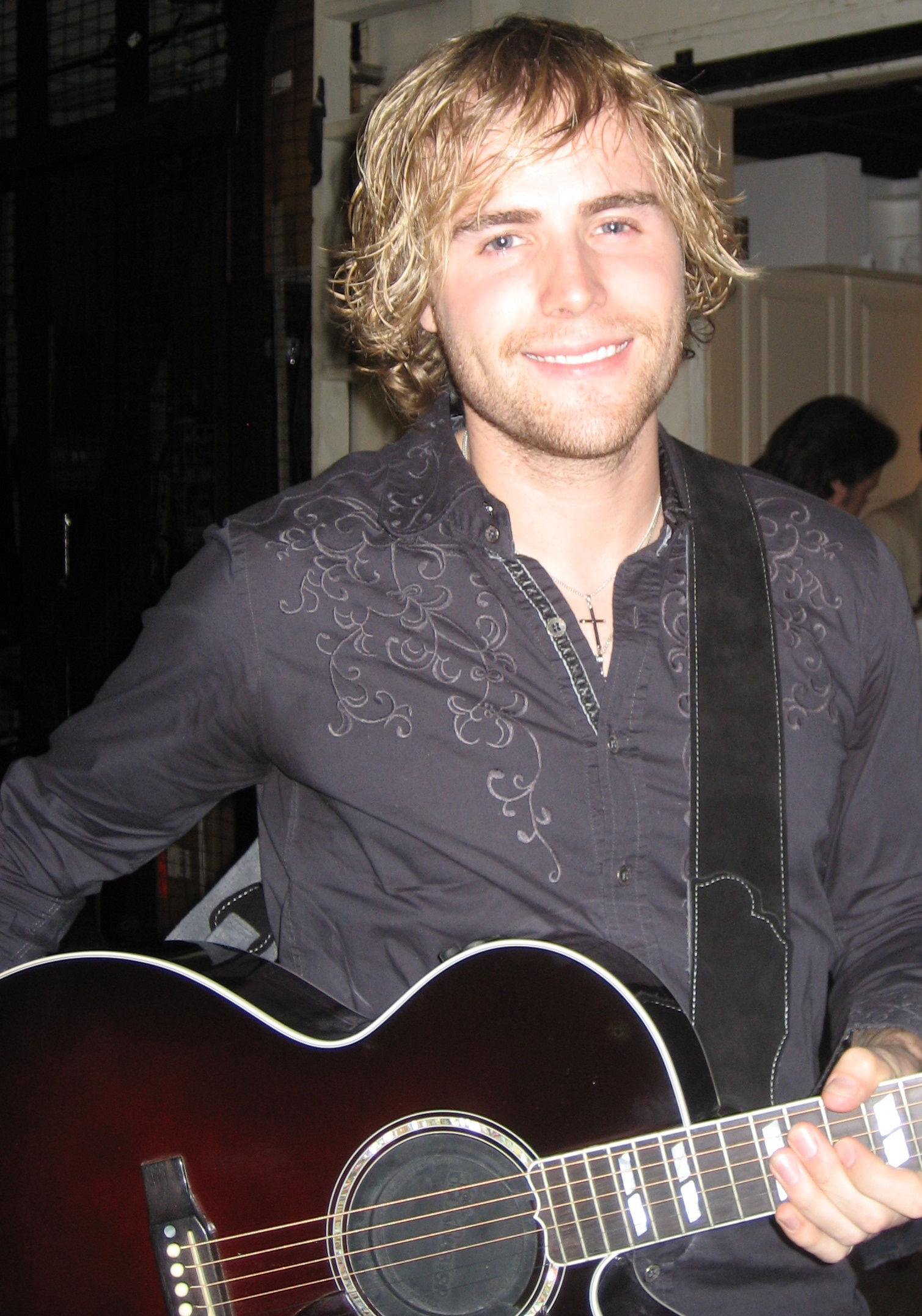

Background information
- Born: July 12, 1985 (age 41); Edmonton, Alberta, Canada
- Genre: Country music
- Occupations: Singer-songwriter, actor
- Years active: 2000–present
- Labels: Epic, Mensa, Big Machine/No Strings Attached/Midas, Open Road, GMV Nashville
- Website: www.adamgregory.com

Adam Gregory (born July 12, 1985) is a Canadian country music singer-songwriter and actor. Active since 2000, he has recorded four studio albums to date, including The Way I'm Made (2000) and Workin' on It (2002), both on Epic Records, and a self-titled album in 2006 on Mensa Records. He has charted several singles on the Canadian country music charts, including two singles which were also Top 40 hits on the Billboard Hot Country Songs chart in the United States. In 2010, Gregory starred in WWJD, a film-based on In His Steps by Charles Sheldon.

== Career ==
=== Canadian career ===
Adam Gregory launched his career in country music when his first album, The Way I'm Made, was released in 2000 on Epic Records. It was certified as a gold record by Music Canada in May 2003. He won a Prairie Music Award for Outstanding Country Music Recording in 2001, and the Canadian Radio Music Award for Best New Country Artist for his song "Horseshoes."

He met Billy Ray Cyrus while performing at Big Valley Jamboree in Camrose, Alberta. Cyrus was the headliner and asked Gregory to perform with him on his hit "Achy Breaky Heart". Soon after, Cyrus was heard on "When I Leave This House". The song was included on Gregory's second album, Workin' on It, which was released in 2002.

Gregory went to Kabul, Afghanistan in 2003 for the OP ATHENA Show Tour from November 19 to December 5 to perform for the troops. Other performers included Dave Broadfoot, Shaun Verrault from Wide Mouth Mason, singer and dancer Jana Jana, and the Rock-Paper-Scissors Improv Comedy group.

Gregory has shown his philanthropic side by being a supporter of the Telemiracle for many years, appearing on the show three times, holding charities for the Ronald McDonald House, and his involvement with the Sunshine Foundation, which is similar to the Make-a-Wish Foundation. Gregory also performed at West Edmonton Mall in 2005 to help raise money for the Canadian Red Cross to donate to the South Asia tsunami fund.

In 2002, Gregory's album Workin' on It was nominated for Album of the Year and Best Graphics at the Canadian Country Music Association awards. Gregory was also nominated in 2005 for the Country Music Association's Global Country Artist Award.

In June 2006, Gregory's third album, Adam Gregory, containing the single, "Get It On", was released by Mensa Records in association with Aquarius Records.

Adam Gregory has continued to further develop his career in the entertainment industry through film, taking a leading role in the comedy Sharp as Marbles. In 2009, he starred in WWJD with John Schneider.

Adam Gregory's song “The World Could Use A Cowboy” was covered by Canadian Country Music Singer Ty Baynton in 2021 on his album Wrong Turns.

=== U.S. crossover ===
In 2007, Gregory signed an exclusive management deal and signed with longtime supporter Jeff Walker of AristoMedia for all publicity campaigns and signed with Midas Records Nashville. He has been booked by the William Morris Agency in Nashville. In April 2008, Gregory released his first single to the United States. "Crazy Days" peaked at No. 33 on the Hot Country Songs chart.

In July 2008, Midas Records Nashville co-signed Gregory with Big Machine Records.

A new album, Crazy Days, was released on March 24, 2009, in Canada through Big Machine/Midas/NSA. The second single from the album, "What It Takes", was released in November and peaked at No. 38 on the Hot Country Songs chart.

In October 2008, Cricket Communications partnered with Big Machine Records and Gregory for a promotional sponsorship with ringtones and in store events for the remainder of 2008.

In January 2009, Gregory became a spokesman for the charity Soles4Souls which raises money and donates shoes for the needy. In 2010, Gregory sang "What Would Jesus Do?" in the movie WWJD, which is based on the book In His Steps by the late Charles Sheldon. Although Big Machine went on to release Gregory's Crazy Days album in conjunction with Open Road Recordings in Canada, a U.S. release never happened, and Gregory left the label to focus on his songwriting and complete a series of tour commitments in his native Canada. Since then, Gregory has focused on his songwriting and recorded a newer, more personal batch of songs.

In 2012, Gregory released his first EP, Different Places. It was recorded with Australian producer Mark Moffatt in 2011 and was released on GMV Nashville/Calusa Entertainment. On February 13, 2013, Gregory signed with Shakir Entertainment Management in New York City.

=== Movie career ===
In 2010, Gregory appeared in What Would Jesus Do.

== Discography ==
=== Studio albums ===
Title	Album details	Peak positions	Certifications
Title	Album details	CAN Country	Certifications
The Way I'm Made	Release date: May 23, 2000; Label: Epic Records	10	CAN: Gold
Workin' on It	Release date: July 9, 2002; Label: Epic Records	—	
Adam Gregory	Release date: June 20, 2006; Label: Mensa Records	—	
Crazy Days	Release date: March 24, 2009; Label: Big Machine/NSA/Midas	—	
"—" denotes releases that did not chart

=== Singles ===
Year	Single	Peak positions			Album
Year	Single	CAN Country	CAN	US Country	Album
2000	"Horseshoes"	2	—	—	The Way I'm Made
2000	"Only Know I Do"	4	—	—	The Way I'm Made
2000	"No Vacancy"	—	—	—	The Way I'm Made
2001	"Big Star"	—	—	—	The Way I'm Made
2001	"It Ain't Cool"	—	—	—	The Way I'm Made
2002	"The World Could Use a Cowboy"	—	—	—	Workin' on It
2002	"Could Have Fooled Me"	—	—	—	Workin' on It
2003	"When I Leave This House" (with Billy Ray Cyrus)	—	—	—	Workin' on It
2003	"Sweet Memories"	—	—	—	Workin' on It
2004	"Never Be Another"	6	—	—	Non-album single
2006	"Get It On"	8	—	—	Adam Gregory
2006	"She's So California"	19	—	—	Adam Gregory
2006	"Don't Send the Invitation (If You Don't Wanna Party)"	24	—	—	Adam Gregory
2007	"One Breath from a Heartache"	19	—	—	Adam Gregory
2008	"Crazy Days"	4	98	33	Crazy Days
2008	"What It Takes"	11	83	38	Crazy Days
2009	"Could I Just Be Me"	27	—	—	Crazy Days
2012	"High On You"	49	—	—	Different Places
"—" denotes releases that did not chart=

=== Music videos ===
Year	Video	Director
2000	"Horseshoes"	Sean Michael Turrell
2000	"Only Know I Do"	Sean Michael Turrell
2001	"No Vacancy"	Pablo Fairhall
2001	"Big Star"	Marc Lostracco
2002	"The World Could Use a Cowboy"	Warren P. Sonoda
2002	"Could Have Fooled Me"	Jeff Stephenson
2003	"When I Leave This House" (with Billy Ray Cyrus)	
2006	"Get It On"	
2006	"Don't Send the Invitation"	
2007	"One Breath from a Heartache"	Warren P. Sonoda
2008	"Crazy Days"	Wes Edwards
2008	"What It Takes"	Roman White
2017	"Dirt Road Therapy"	

== Awards and nominations ==
Year	Association	Category	Result
2000	Canadian Country Music Association	FACTOR Rising Star Award	Nominated
2001	Juno Awards of 2001	Best New Solo Artist	Nominated
2001	Juno Awards of 2001	Best Country Male Artist	Nominated
2001	Canadian Country Music Association	Male Artist of the Year	Nominated
2001	Canadian Country Music Association	Chevy Trucks Rising Star Award	Nominated
2001	Canadian Country Music Association	Album of the Year – The Way I'm Made	Nominated
2002	Canadian Country Music Association	Fans' Choice Award	Nominated
2002	Canadian Country Music Association	Male Artist of the Year	Nominated
2003	Canadian Country Music Association	Male Artist of the Year	Nominated
2003	Canadian Country Music Association	Album of the Year – Workin' on It	Nominated
