= The Way I'm Made =

Studio album by Adam Gregory
- Released: May 23, 2000
- Genre: Country
- Length: 47:27
- Label: Epic
- Producer: David C. Martin

Adam Gregory chronology
The Way I'm Made (2000)	Workin' on It (2002)

The Way I'm Made is the first studio album by Canadian country music singer Adam Gregory, released on May 23, 2000, by Epic Records. It has since been certified Gold by the CRIA for sales of 50,000 copies. The album earned Gregory a Prairie Music Award for Outstanding Country Music Recording in September 2001.

== Track listing ==
1. "Only Know I Do" (Jamie Houston, David C. Martin) – 3:37
2. "Horseshoes" (Ben Dunk, Martin, Memphis) – 3:14
3. "No Vacancy" (Martin) – 3:28
4. "Big Star" (Hal Draper) – 3:58
5. "City Boy's Dream" (Memphis) – 3:59
6. "The Way I'm Made" (Martin) – 4:30
7. "Facts of Life" (Houston, Martin) – 3:28
8. "Half Past Loving You" (Martin) – 3:08
9. "Too Young to Know" (Jason Levine, James McCollum) – 3:40
10. "It Ain't Cool" (Clif Magness, Martin, Chris Waters) – 3:55
11. "The Ring" (Draper, David Quilco) – 2:49
12. "The Sky Is the Limit" (Adam Gregory) – 2:59
13. "Leavin' That Cowgirl with the Blues" (Martin) – 3:34

== Personnel ==
- Mike Brignardello – bass guitar
- Larry Byrom – acoustic guitar
- Dan Dugmore – electric guitar, steel guitar
- Larry Franklin – fiddle
- Adam Gregory – lead vocals
- John Hobbs – keyboards
- Jamie Houston – background vocals
- Jeff King – electric guitar
- Paul Leim – drums
- Brian Leonard – percussion
- Brent Mason – acoustic guitar, electric guitar
- Mark Sterling – dobro, acoustic guitar, background vocals
- Lonnie Wilson – drums

== Chart performance ==
Chart (2000)	Peak position
Canadian RPM Country Albums	10

=== Year-end charts ===
Chart (2001)	Position
Canadian Country Albums (Nielsen SoundScan)	49
