= Only Know I Do =

2000 song performed by Adam Gregory

Single by Adam Gregory

from the album The Way I'm Made
- Released: 2000
- Genre: Country
- Length: 3:37
- Label: Epic
- Songwriters: David C. Martin; Jamie Houston
- Producer: David C. Martin

Adam Gregory singles chronology
"Horseshoes" (2000)	"Only Know I Do" (2000)	"No Vacancy" (2000)

"Only Know I Do" is a song recorded by Canadian country music artist Adam Gregory. It was released in 2000 as the second single from his debut album, The Way I'm Made. It peaked at number 4 on the RPM Country Tracks chart in October 2000.

== Chart performance ==
Chart (2000)	Peak position
Canada Country Singles (RPM)	4

=== Year-end charts ===
Chart (2000)	Position
Canada Radio (Nielsen BDS)	50
