= What It Takes (Adam Gregory song) =

Single by Adam Gregory

from the album Crazy Days
- Released: October 27, 2008
- Genre: Country
- Length: 3:30
- Label: Big Machine; NSA; Midas
- Songwriters: Lee Brice; Greg Crowe; Adam Gregory; Kyle Jacobs; Joe Leathers
- Producers: Keith Follesé; Brad Allen

Adam Gregory singles chronology
"Crazy Days" (2008)	"What It Takes" (2008)	"Could I Just Be Me" (2009)

"What It Takes" is a song recorded by Canadian country music artist Adam Gregory. It is the second single from Crazy Days, his first album to be released in the United States. The song has reached top 40 on the Billboard Hot Country Songs chart in the United States.

== Chart positions ==
Chart (2008–09)	Peak position
Canada Hot 100 (Billboard)	83
US Hot Country Songs (Billboard)	38
