= Kerry Marx =

American guitarist and studio musician

Background information
- Born: Aiken, South Carolina
- Occupation: Studio musician
- Website: www.kerrymarx.com
- South Carolina Entertainment & Music Hall of Fame (Inducted 2023)

Kerry Alan Marx is an American guitarist and studio musician who has served as music director of the Grand Ole Opry's Opry Band since 2018. He is best known for his work with that organization, where he has been staff guitarist since 2000. He has been described as being among "Nashville's most in-demand musicians", and has played with many high-profile musicians including Johnny Cash, Taylor Swift, John Legend, James Taylor, and Steven Tyler. He was guitarist for the CD "Songs From The Neighborhood," which received a Grammy award, the album Many Moods of Moses which received a Grammy nomination, and for the 2 time multi-platinum self-titled album by musical group Blackhawk.

Marx was also a member of The Johnny Cash Show band, and toured extensively with Don McLean. In June 2023, Marx was inducted into the South Carolina Entertainment & Music Hall of Fame.

== Biography ==
=== Early life, education, and career ===
Born in Aiken, South Carolina, Marx studied music at the University of South Carolina; a 1971 article noted that he was a "stand-in bass guitarist" for Wax Bean, the winning band in an Aiken Battle of the Bands. He then went on to concentrate in jazz guitar while attending North Texas State University in Denton, TX. He moved to Nashville in 1981 and has played a variety of jazz, pop, rock, and country music in the Nashville recording scene. Marx "broke into the demo scene gradually, in between road trips". Marx related the frustrations of working as a session musician during that time, noting that session producers often did not convey their thoughts about whether the session had gone well. On one song recorded by both Mark Chesnutt and Chad Mullins, Marx "came up with a guitar line that the publisher said he wasn't crazy about", but that Marx then heard on the records, "played by a steel instead of a guitar"—an experience that Marx said "reassures me about my song sense and session sense".

Marx toured with artists such as Ray Price (1979–1981), Jerry Reed (1981–1983), Razzy Bailey (1983–1984), Ronnie Milsap (1984–1987), Johnny Cash (1989–1992), Toby Keith and Shania Twain (1993), Don McLean (2001–2023), Lee Ann Womack (2004), Porter Wagoner (2006), Steve Wariner (2006–2007), Lynda Carter (2008–2022), Olivia Newton-John (2012–2018), Johnny Mathis (2016–2024). Other artists Marx is noted to have worked with include Natalie Cole, Taylor Swift, John Legend, James Taylor, and Branford Marsalis. By 1983, Marx had become the lead guitarist of the True Life Country Band backing B. J. Thomas. A 1986 review of a Ronnie Milsap benefit concert in Durham, North Carolina noted that despite the country tones of the show, "other aspects of the performance more closely resembled a rock concert, such as Kerry Marx's soaring lead guitar solo". Marx's association with Johnny Cash began in 1989 when Cash's longtime guitarist Bob Wooton took a leave of absence from performing. He was noted for his contribution to Cash's song, "I'm an Easy Rider" from the 1991 album, The Mystery of Life, described as "a road song featuring Kerry Marx's hard-edged and doubled-up baritone guitar". Marx left Cash's band in 1992 to pursue other projects. In the late 1990s, he was also lead guitarist in TNN's Prime Time Country band.

=== Opry Band membership and later work ===
Amidst concerns about declining Opry participation by high-profile members, newly promoted Grand Ole Opry director Pete Fisher fired five members of the Opry Band, and brought on Marx, as well as fiddler Hoot Hester, and drummer John Gardner. The new lineup, with Marx as staff guitarist, debuted in January 2000, and was well-received, with a 2001 review of the Grand Ole Opry house band noting that "pianist Tim Atwood and guitarist Kerry Marx play with rare taste, feel, and soul".

Concurrently with his work on the Opry Band, Marx has performed and composed for major networks, most notably for the Lionel Richie Special (2012), Hannah Montana, American Music Awards (2005–2017), Billboard Music Awards (20012–2022), Academy of Country Music Awards (2003–2022), CMA Christmas (2012–2019), Country Music Association (CMA) Awards (2011–2021, 1992 Rock & Roll Hall of Fame Induction Ceremony, and the 1985 Grammy Awards. Working with Lynda Carter, Marx also performed original music for the 2015 video game, Fallout 4. In 2017, for former state trooper Michael Luster's tribute song for fallen military members and first responders, Kerry assembled a group of session musicians who had worked with numerous famous performers. In 2020, he performed on a Christmas project for sisters Kandy Isley and Kim Johnson. In February 2021, Marx was one of four members of the Opry house band brought into Daywind Studios in Hendersonville, Tennessee, as an electric guitarist on the Darin & Brooke Aldridge song, "Grand Ole Circle".

Beginning in 2023, Marx has also been a member of The Tennessee Four, a group formed to celebrate the legacy of Johnny Cash. The ensemble features Cash's grandson, Thomas Gabriel, along with veteran musicians who performed with Cash during his career, including Marx on guitar, Paul Leim on drums, and Dave Roe on bass. Marx also featured on several songs for the 2024 album, Songwriter, containing previously unreleased Johnny Cash recordings.

In March 2023, Marx was inducted into the South Carolina Entertainment & Music Hall of Fame for his music career, and in May 2023, Marx toured with Don McLean in Australia. In March 2024, Marx performed in a career retrospective with then 89-year-old Johnny Mathis, and later that month was announced as the featured entertainer for the 2024 South Carolina Entertainment & Music Hall of Fame Induction Ceremony. In May 2025, Marx performed with then 90-year-old trumpeter Herb Alpert.

As of 2011, Marx played Schenk guitars, handcrafted by Silverdale, Washington, engineer and guitar maker Rod Schenk. Over the course of his career, Marx came up with four points to convey to musicians trying to succeed in the industry: be realistic in self-assessing your ability; avoid taking jobs that take time away from your career; be pleasant and friendly; and "Don't go away!"

== Discography ==
- 1990, The Mystery of Life, Johnny Cash, acoustic guitar, electric guitar
- 1993, Bob Dylan – The 30th Anniversary Concert Celebration, guitar
- 1995, Standing On The Edge, Johnny Berry, electric guitar
- 1997, Christmas Time, Eddy Arnold, electric guitar
- 1997, Many Moods of Moses, Beenie Man, guitar
- 1997, Butterfly Kisses, Jeff Carson, guitar
- 2000, Greatest Hits, Blackhawk, electric guitar
- 2002, American IV: The Man Comes Around, Johnny Cash, acoustic guitar
- 2003, O Mickey, Where Art Thou, Disney, acoustic guitar
- 2003, Comfort of Her Wings, Charley Pride, main personnel, electric guitar
- 2007, The Great Lost Performance, Johnny Cash, main personnel, guitar
- 2008, How Great Thou Art: Gospel Favorites from the Grand Ole Opry, acoustic guitar, main personnel
- 2008, Best of BJ Thomas, BJ Thomas, acoustic guitar, electric guitar
- 2009, Then Sings My Soul, Ronnie Milsap, acoustic guitar
- 2011, Choices, Charley Pride, electric guitar
- 2013, Sending You A Little Christmas, Johnny Mathis (with Natalie Cole, Susan Boyle, Jim Brickman), electric guitar, acoustic guitar

== Television ==
=== Guitarist and composer ===
- 2016, Two and a Half Men
- 2002–2003, Academy of Country Music Pre-Show
- 2003–2022, Academy of Country Music Awards
- 2013–2022, Billboard Music Awards
- 2005, 20th Anniversary-Academy of Country Music
- 2005–2016, American Music Awards
- 2011–2022, ABC CMA Awards
- 2007–2012, Hannah Montana
- 2007–2009, Colgate Country Showdown
- 2008–2009, Miss America Pageant
- 2009, George Strait Tribute
- 2009-2017, My First Home
- 2009–2012, American Idol
- 2010–2012, Men Seeking Women
- 2011, CMT's Next Superstar
- 2011, Country Divas TV Special
- 2011–2012, I Didn't Know I Was Pregnant
- 2012, ABC-Lionel Richie Special
- 2012-2017, Auction Kings
- 2012-2017, Duck Dynasty
- 2012, Here Comes Honey Boo Boo
- 2012, Toddlers & Tiaras
- Lifestyles of the Rich and Famous
- Passions
- Guiding Light
- Another World
- As the World Turns
- Riviera (French soap opera)
- Prime Time Country
- All My Children

=== Live TV credits ===
- ABC Lionel Richie Special
- 2011–2016, ABC CMA Christmas
- NPT-In Performance at the White House
- TNN "Prime Time Country"
- Grand Ole Opry Live
- Grand Ole Opry Gospel Special
- Dove Awards
- Music City Tonight
- Late Nite With David Letterman
- 1992 Rock & Roll Hall of Fame Induction Ceremony
- 1985 Grammy Awards
- Solid Gold
- Grammy Living Legends Awards
- Entertainment Tonight
- Hee Haw
- Austin City Limits
- CBS Country Christmas
- The Jimmy Dean Show
- Wrangler Country Star Search
- New Country
- Bob Braun Show
- Nashville Now
- Today Show
- Tommy Hunter Show
- Best Little Whorehouse in Texas Special
- Dick Clark Great American Sing-Along
- Toast to Burt Reynolds
- Solid Gold Christmas Show
- Pop Goes the Country
- That Nashville Music
- Jerry Reed and Special Friends
- Music City USA
- Nashville Palace
- Nashville After Hours
- Tribute to Ralph Emery Show
- Company's Comin- Porter Wagoner TNN Special
- On Stage

== Film soundtracks ==
- We Were Soldiers (w/ Dave Matthews & Johnny Cash)
- The Apostle (w/ Wynonna & Gary Chapman)
- Red Rocks West (w/ Johnny Cash)

== Jingles and commercial products ==
- Apple Logic Pro demo sounds
- American Automobile Association
- Captain America toys
- Captain Planet Toys
- Chevrolet
- Chex Cereal
- Churchill Downs
- Citgo
- CMT
- Eveready Batteries
- Ford Trucks
- General Motors
- Goody's Department Stores
- H&R Block
- HGTV
- Honda
- John Deere
- Kahn's Meats
- King's Island
- Larami Toys
- Lincoln
- Little King Cream Ale
- McDonald's
- Murray Bikes
- Procter & Gamble products
- RCA
- Sangria Wine
- Super Soaker Toy Guns
- Tampa Bay Bandits
- Tyson's Chicken
- Universal Tire
- Wal-Mart
- Yellow Pages
- Sandals Resorts

== Personal life ==
In November 1975, Marx married Janice Christine Wynn in Dayton, Ohio.
