= Jimmy Capps =

American country guitarist (1939–2020)

Jimmy Capps (May 25, 1939 – June 2020) was an American country guitarist who played with various acts, including a tenure of over 61 years on the Opry, over 53 in the Opry Band, the house band of the Grand Ole Opry.

== Biography ==
Born in Fayetteville, North Carolina, and raised in nearby Benson, he began playing guitar at age twelve after receiving his first instrument and quickly developed an interest in country music, listening to the Grand Ole Opry on the radio. As a teenager, he performed on local radio and television programs in North Carolina and South Carolina before moving to Nashville in the late 1950s.

Capps' professional breakthrough came in 1958 when he joined The Louvin Brothers as a guitarist. He made his debut on the Grand Ole Opry that same year, performing with the duo, and by 1960 he was "regarded as one of the top guitar talents in Nashville". He remained with the Louvin Brothers until 1962.

Capps joined the Opry house band, where he thereafter played lead guitar weekly for more than 61 years. Capps was also a prolific session musician, performing on country recordings including the Kenny Rogers song "The Gambler", the Tammy Wynette song "Stand by Your Man",, the George Jones song "He Stopped Loving Her Today", the Barbara Mandrell song "I Was Country When Country Wasn't Cool", the Oakridge Boys song, "Elvira, and the George Strait song "Amarillo by Morning". At the height of his career, he participated in more than 500 recording sessions per year. Other artists with whom Capps worked as a guitarist included Johnny Cash, Reba McEntire, Alan Jackson, Conway Twitty, and Ray Charles. He also worked as a producer on recordings for artists such as Jan Howard and the Wilburn Brothers.

Capps appeared on the television program Larry's Country Diner, as "Sheriff Jimmy Capps."

== Recognition ==
He was part of The Nashville A-Team, and in 2012, the Country Music Hall of Fame and Museum recognized him as a "Nashville Cat", a designation for top session musicians. Jimmy was inducted into the Musicians Hall of Fame and Museum on January 28, 2014 and on October 16, 2014, Capps was inducted into the N.C. Music Hall of Fame. In 2015, the Tennessee Senate passed a Joint Resolution recognizing his contributions to the music industry, and the governor of the state, Bill Haslam named him a "Goodwill Ambassador" for the state. In 2018, he published an autobiography, The Man in Back, and on December 21 of that year, Jimmy's 60th Opry Anniversary, the Opry Band's rehearsal space was renamed in honor of Capps, "the longest-tenured member of the Opry band, who first appeared on The Opry in 1958". In 2024, a segment of Interstate 40 was named after him.

Capps died in Nashville at the age of 81.
