= Crazy Days (album) =

Studio album by Adam Gregory
- Released: March 24, 2009
- Genre: Country
- Length: 36:35
- Label: Big Machine/NSA/Midas
- Producers: Keith Follesé; Brad Allen

Adam Gregory chronology
Adam Gregory (2006)	Crazy Days (2009)	Different Places (2012)

Singles from Crazy Days
- 1. "Crazy Days" Released: April 14, 2008; 2. "What It Takes" Released: October 27, 2008; 3. "Could I Just Be Me" Released: May 12, 2009

Crazy Days is the fourth studio album by Canadian country music artist Adam Gregory. It was released in Canada on March 24, 2009, by Big Machine/NSA/Midas. The album contains the singles "Crazy Days," "What It Takes" and "Could I Just Be Me."

== Track listing ==
No.	Title	Writer(s)	Length
1.	"Crazy Days"	Lee Brice, Adam Gregory, Kyle Jacobs, Joe Leathers	3:16
2.	"Could I Just Be Me"	Keith Follesé, Gregory, Richie Supa	3:11
3.	"What It Takes"	Brice, Greg Crowe, Gregory, Jacobs, Leathers	3:39
4.	"Fast Enough"	Kris Bergsnes, Jacobs, Leathers	3:41
5.	"Stronger"	Anthony L. Smith, K. Follese, Gregory	3:29
6.	"Down the Road"	Brice, Gregory, Jacobs, Leathers	3:19
7.	"Get It While the Gettin's Good"	Billy Crain, Adrienne Follesé, K. Follesé, Gregory	3:04
8.	"If I'd Only"	Brock Allender, Jacobs, Shaun Shakel	3:25
9.	"Then She Cried"	Michael Dulaney, K. Follese, Gregory	3:28
10.	"Blue Corvette"	A. Follese, K. Follese, Gregory	3:02
11.	"What Would Jesus Do"	K. Follese, Billy Yates	3:01

== Personnel ==
- Richard "Spady" Brannon – bass guitar
- Steve Brewster – drums
- Pat Buchanan – electric guitar
- Gary Burnette – acoustic guitar
- Perry Coleman – background vocals
- Larry Franklin – fiddle, mandolin
- Adam Gregory – lead vocals
- Charlie Judge – keyboards, organ, piano
- Kerry Marx – electric guitar
- Greg Morrow – drums
- Jimmy Nichols – keyboards, organ, piano
- Scotty Sanders – steel guitar
