= Horseshoes (song) =

2000 song performed by Adam Gregory

Single by Adam Gregory

from the album The Way I'm Made
- Released: 2000
- Genre: Country
- Length: 3:14
- Label: Epic
- Songwriters: Ben Dunk; David C. Martin; Memphis
- Producer: David C. Martin

Adam Gregory singles chronology
"Horseshoes" (2000)	"Only Know I Do" (2000)

"Horseshoes" is a song recorded by Canadian country music artist Adam Gregory. It was released in 2000 as the first single from his debut album, The Way I'm Made. It peaked at number 2 on the RPM Country Tracks chart in July 2000. In 2001 it was named by SOCAN as one of the most performed Canadian country songs.

== Chart performance ==
Chart (2000)	Peak position
Canada Country Singles (RPM)	2
