= In His Steps =

1896 book by Charles Sheldon

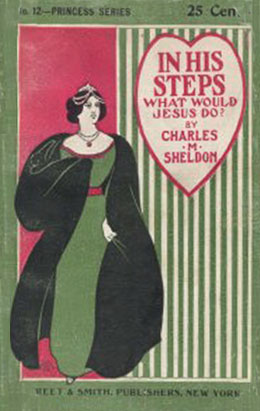
- A later edition (New York: Street & Smith, 1897)
- Author: Charles Monroe Sheldon
- Language: English
- Genre: Christian novel
- Publisher: Chicago Advance
- Publication date: 1896
- Publication place: United States
- Media type: Print

In His Steps is a religious fiction novel written by Charles Monroe Sheldon. First published in 1896, the book has sold more than 50 million copies and is one of the bestselling books of all time. The full title of the book is In His Steps: What Would Jesus Do?

Although variations of the phrase "What would Jesus do?" have been used by Christians for centuries as a form of imitatio dei, the imitation of God, it gained greater currency following the publication of the book.

Chicago Advance, the original publisher, failed to register the copyright in the proper form. Other publishers took advantage of this, publishing the book without paying the author royalties. This resulted in lowered prices, but multiple publishers led to larger sales.

== History ==
In the 1880s, Charles Monroe Sheldon began writing "sermon stories" for his Sunday night services. These asked the question "What would Jesus do?" in the lives of various characters. They were published in the Congregational magazine, Advance, and used by other ministers. The book's ten-cent paperback edition sold 100,000 copies.

In 2006, the critic Gregory Jackson wrote that "Even today, In His Steps is the focus of annual youth gatherings" and part of the What would Jesus do? Movement.

== Plot ==
In His Steps takes place in the city of Raymond, west of Topeka, Kansas. The main character is Rev. Henry Maxwell, pastor of the First Church of Raymond. He challenges his congregation to not do anything for a whole year without first asking: "What Would Jesus Do?" Other characters include Ed Norman, senior editor of the Raymond Daily Newspaper, Rachel Winslow, a singer, and Virginia Page, an heiress.

The novel begins on a Friday morning when a man out of work (later identified as Jack Manning) appears at the front door of Henry Maxwell while the latter is preparing for that Sunday's upcoming sermon. Maxwell listens to the man's plea briefly before brushing him away and closing the door. The same man appears in the church at the end of the Sunday sermon, walks to "the open space in front of the pulpit," and faces the people. He quietly confronts the congregation—"I'm not complaining; just stating facts"—about their compassion, or apathetic lack thereof, for the jobless like him in Raymond. Upon finishing his address to the congregation, he collapses and then dies a few days later.

That next Sunday, Henry Maxwell, moved by the events of the past week, presents a challenge to his congregation: "Do not do anything without first asking, 'What would Jesus do?'" This challenge is the driving force of the plot. From this point on, the rest of the novel consists of episodes that focus on individual characters as their lives are transformed.

Norman decides not to print a prize fight, and to discontinue the Sunday edition, leaving a drop in subscriptions. Alexander Powers starts a meeting for the railroad men but also discovers the railroad's fraud against the ICC. He resigns his post and goes to work as a telegraph clerk. Rollin Page proposes to Rachel Winslow, who rejects him because he has no direction in life. Later Rachel and Virginia help Mr. and Mrs. Gray with meetings in the Rectangle (an area surrounded by saloons), and Rollin experiences a conversion. Later, Virginia takes Loreen, a drunken "lost girl" and prostitute who was earlier converted, to her house, to the dismay of her grandmother. Jasper Chase, against the "What Would Jesus Do" vow, decides to print his novel anyway. Virginia later uses her inheritance to buy the Rectangle property and also to help Norman's newspaper. Rollin, having found a purpose for his life helping people, declares his love for Rachel.

Chapters 16–24 shift the action to Chicago, with Dr. Calvin Bruce, a resident of Chicago, visiting Raymond, and writing what he saw. He then decides to try the vow. His bishop, Bishop Edward Hampton, visits him also. Rachel's cousins Felicia and Rose are orphaned when their father commits suicide and their mother dies of shock. They go to live in Raymond for a while. Dr. Bruce and the Bishop start a work in the Settlement (similar to the Rectangle), with help from Felicia. The Bishop is held up, but the robber realizes the Bishop was the same person who helped him, and he reforms. Some of the characters from the earlier chapters, such as Henry Maxwell, Rachel Winslow, appear to see the work in the Settlement. In the last chapter, Henry Maxwell sees a vision, telling the future of many characters in the book.

== Critical response ==
A review of 1899 said of the novel:

as we close the book we feel that folly and anarchy reign supreme. Of course literary criticism has nothing to say to work such as this; Mr. Sheldon neither writes English nor even first-rate American. As a story In His Steps is lacking in every artistic quality that a story should possess, and worst of all, any sense of humour is conspicuously absent.

The reviewer objects to the book's theology as a "gross caricature", and says that "its tendency is toward the creation of the morbid and the priggish, the Philistine and the piously fraudulent".

Paul Boyer, writing in 1971, noted the "abysmal literary quality of the novel". He said that it "is concerned only minimally with religion, social injustice or reform, but that it is concerned, almost obsessively, with certain psychological and emotional problems troubling the American middle class at the close of the 19th century". He notes that:

the Christian religion, whether viewed in its historical, institutional or personal aspect, plays an extremely limited role in the novel. The principal characters make absolutely no effort—either through consulting the biblical record, or church history, or contemporary pronouncements by religious bodies on social and economic issues—to discover what, in fact, their social duty as Christians might be. The query "What Would Jesus Do?" is endlessly reiterated, but no systematic answer is sought.

Boyer says that the actions the characters take are "rather tepid and inconclusive reforms". For him, the interest is in the white middle-class society shown in the book, which is:

deeply fearful of, yet simultaneously fascinated by, the burgeoning immigrant working-class population which is crowding into the cities. At the same time, and perhaps more intensely, the members of this middle class are troubled by the emotional atrophy and the inadequacy of social relationships which characterize their lives.

The critic Gregory Jackson, writing in 2006, said that it is difficult for modern readers to understand the contemporary response to Social Gospel novels like In Our Steps. He says that readers at the time would have had "a set of reading practices derived from older sermonic and religious pedagogical tradition", and "read religious fictions as experiential templates for their own lives". He notes that the book is "a sharp call for social intervention", and that it led to people taking action in their communities to address poverty and inequality. An example is the kindergarten Shelton's congregation set up to bring about integration between racially-segregated communities; Jackson writes that this was part of early civil rights activism.

== Characters ==
- Rev. Henry Maxwell, pastor of 1st church of Raymond, having been there 10 years when the story starts
- Mrs. Mary Maxwell, Henry Maxwell's wife. Appears briefly in chapter 1
- Jack Manning, a man who lost his job 10 months earlier due to the Linotype machine making him redundant, collapses in Rev. Maxwell's church, and later dies in his house starting the chain of events
- Dr. Phillip West, local medical doctor
- Rachel Winslow, a young woman, cousin of Felicia and Rose, who trades a singing career for singing for the services in the Rectangle. Eventually marries Rollin Page
- Edward Norman, editor of the Daily News
- George, one of the clerks for the Daily News, who works with the delivery boys.
- Clark, one of the managing editors of the Daily News
- Alexander Powers, Railroad superintendent of L&T R.R., later telegraph clerk
- Celia Powers, George's daughter
- Donald Marsh, president of Lincoln College in Raymond
- Milton Wright, a businessman
- Jasper Chase, an author, rebuffed by Rachel, then conspicuously absent, finally denies his Lord
- Virginia Page, a young heiress, friend of Rachel
- Madame Florence Page, Virginia's grandmother
- Rollin Page, Virginia's brother, who will eventually marry Rachel
- Jennifer Winslow, Rachel's mother, and Felicia & Rose's aunt
- Lewis Winslow, Rachel's brother
- Mr. & Mrs. John Gray, traveling evangelists, who work in the Rectangle
- Fred Morris, Endeavor Society president, later works for Norman's paper
- Loreen Carson, a drunken "lost girl" and "outcast", later dies from being hit on the head
- Mrs Brown, Miss Wren, Miss Kyle, schoolteachers in Raymond

=== People from Chicago ===
- Felicia Sterling, Rachel's cousin, 19 years old with brown eyes. Orphaned in the story, later marries Clyde
- Rose Sterling, Felicia's sister, and Rachel's other cousin, 21 years old at the time of the story. Later marries for wealth, and dark details are obscured.
- Mrs. Delano, a chaperone for young girls
- Mr. Stephen Clyde, a carpenter, marries Felicia Sterling
- Rev. Calvin Bruce, seminary classmate of Henry Maxwell, pastor of Nazareth Avenue Church in Chicago. Challenged by what has happened in Raymond, does similarly in Chicago
- Mrs. Bruce, Rev. Calvin's wife
- Charles R. Sterling, father of Felicia and Rose. Commits suicide when he loses his fortune
- Camilla Rolf Sterling, mother of Felicia and Rose, and Rachel's aunt. Chose to marry Charles instead of the Bishop. Dies of shock after the death of her husband
- Bishop Edward Hampton, works with Dr. Calvin Bruce
- Burns, a person whom Bishop Hampton helped 15 years before. Tries, with an unnamed friend to rob the Bishop, but stops when he realizes who the Bishop is
- Clayton Price, owner of a saloon by the settlement
- Clarence Penrose, owner of houses in Chicago
- Diana Penrose, his daughter
- Carlson

== Jesus Is Here ==
Sheldon wrote a sequel to In His Steps titled Jesus Is Here, where Christ visits the characters of In His Steps, supposedly a few years later. The book is written in much the same language and style as In His Steps, with many of the same characters (and some added ones). This book's recurring phrase, used in the description of Jesus, is, "Like an average man. Only different."

=== Plot ===
Jesus appears quietly at first to one person and then to an expanding group of people in the small town of Raymond. He gradually draws more and more attention, including crowds. Jesus goes from Raymond to New York City and then Washington, D.C., at points making a public splash, including media attention. The non-stereotypical character of Jesus seems fully capable of supernatural power (not showing up in pictures, for example) but chooses a nondescript mode of presenting himself. He does not appear to do dramatic public acts such as healing, but instead speaks words of comfort or lends practical help. He has views but relays them with understatement. He wears ordinary business clothes, at times blends into a crowd, and is not memorable in appearance. He is humble, practical and personable. His impact upon lives is not through obvious miracles but through old-fashioned kindness, care, and encouragement.

== Updated edition of original work ==
- Charles M. Sheldon, Bell, James S. Jr. (ed.) In His Steps. Cook Publishing Company. "A timeless classic updated in today's language." ISBN 1-58919-993-6

== See also ==
- Howard Pyle (1903 novel, Rejected of Men)
- In His Steps (1964 film)
- W. T. Stead (If Christ Came to Chicago)
- "WWJD" (2010 Movie) starring Canadian Country Singer Adam Gregory
- What would Jesus do?
