= Crazy Days (song) =

Single by Adam Gregory

from the album Crazy Days
- Released: April 14, 2008
- Genre: Country
- Length: 3:12
- Label: Big Machine; NSA; Midas
- Songwriters: Adam Gregory; Lee Brice; Kyle Jacobs; Joe Leathers
- Producers: Keith Follesé; Brad Allen

Adam Gregory singles chronology
"One Breath from a Heartache" (2007)	"Crazy Days" (2008)	"What It Takes" (2008)

"Crazy Days" is a song recorded by Canadian country music artist Adam Gregory. It was released as the first single from Crazy Days, his first album to be released in the United States. It reached number 98 on the Canadian Hot 100. It also peaked at number 33 on the Billboard Hot Country Songs chart in the United States.

== Chart positions ==
Chart (2008)	Peak position
Canada Hot 100 (Billboard)	98
US Hot Country Songs (Billboard)	33
