= Abraham Lincoln, what would you do? =

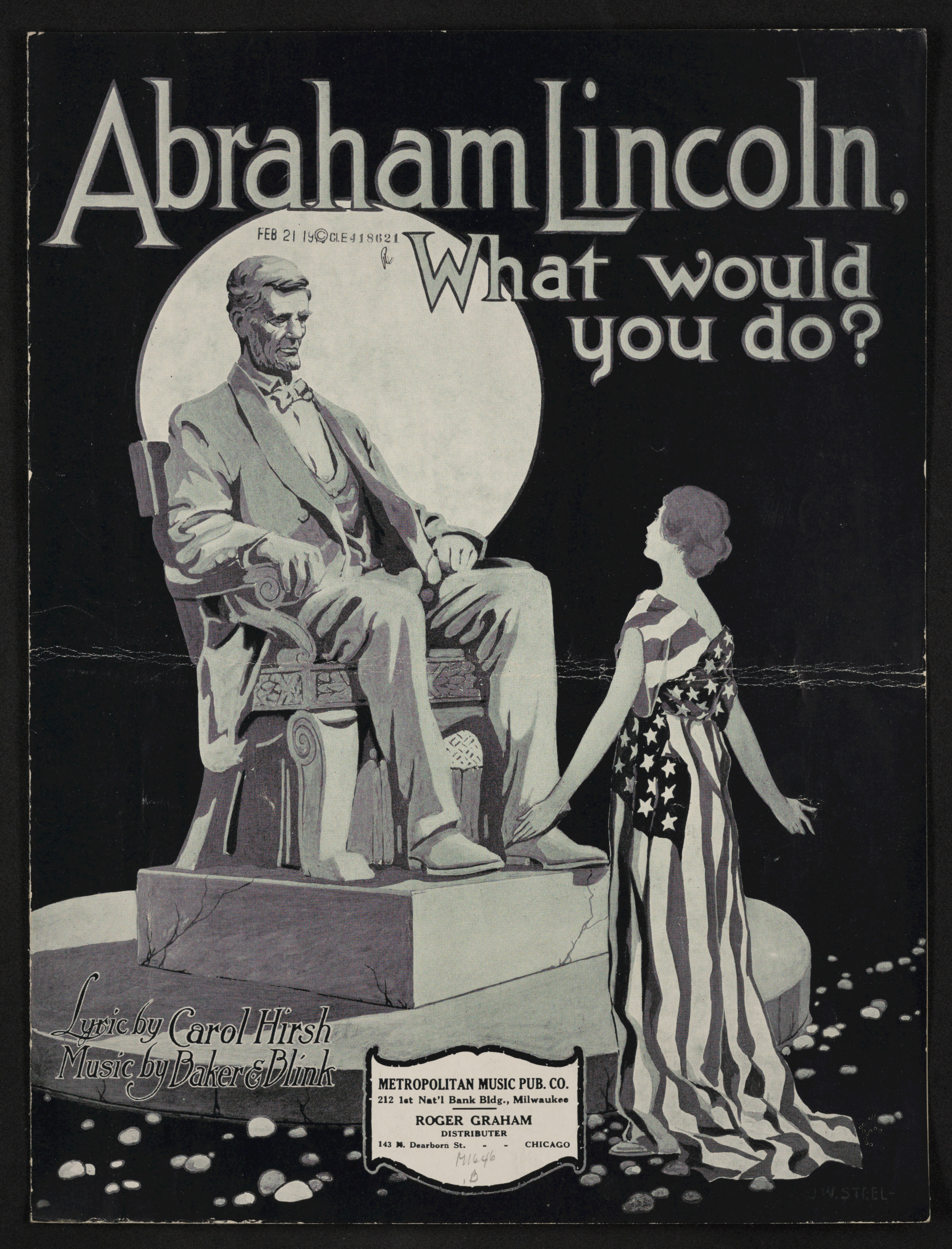
- Sheet music cover for "Abraham Lincoln, what would you do?"

Song
- Published: 1918
- Songwriters: Composer: Baker and Blink; Lyricist: Carol Hirsch

"Abraham Lincoln, what would you do?" is an American patriotic musical composition released in 1918. Its lyrics were written by Carol Hirsch and its music composed by Baker and Blink. The song is considered to be part of a larger effort to create support for American efforts during World War I.

== Composition ==
The composition was published in 1918 by the Metropolitan Music Company, with Carol Hirsch as the lyricist, and Baker and Blink (of the Metropolitan Music Company) composing the score. The piece was arranged for piano and includes a single voice part. The song is upbeat and set to an allegro moderato tempo. Thematically, the song is considered part of American patriotic music.

== Usage during World War I ==
Although Abraham Lincoln's death was well before the beginning of the twentieth century, he was often used symbolically, particularly during World War I. "Abraham Lincoln, what would you do?" was a popular composition upon its release, and Lincoln's image was used in the composition's lyrics to promote and build support for American involvement during wartime. Sociologist Barry Schwartz suggests that the lyrics represented American involvement in the war in terms of a collective debt to be paid to Lincoln's contributions and legacy, specifically in the line: "Abraham Lincoln, we owe it to you, to protect this great country today". This idea of indebtedness is also reflected in the illustration on the cover of the sheet music; Schwartz comments that the United States is portrayed as Columbia, a woman draped in the American Flag with open arms looking up to Lincoln's statue and seeking to follow his example.
