= Grand Ole Opry =

Radio and television broadcast from Nashville, Tennessee

- Other names: WSM Barn Dance (1925–1927)
- Genre: Country; Bluegrass; Gospel; Stand-up comedy
- Running time: 120 minutes (+20-minute intermission) (7:00 pm – 9:20 pm)
- Country of origin: United States
- Home station: WSM
- Syndicates: Willie's Roadhouse
- Announcer: Mike Terry; Charlie Mattos; Kelly Sutton; Larry Gatlin (Opry Country Classics)
- Created by: George D. Hay
- Executive producer: Dan Rogers
- Recording studio: Grand Ole Opry House (Nashville) (1974–present); Ryman Auditorium (Nashville) (1943–1974, winter venue 1999–2020, 2023–present); War Memorial Auditorium (Nashville) (1939–1943); Dixie Tabernacle (Nashville) (1936–1939); Hillsboro Theatre (Nashville) (1934–1936); National Life and Accident Insurance Company, Studio C (Nashville) (1925–1934)
- Original release: November 28, 1925 – present
- No. of episodes: 5,230 (as of March 28, 2026, counting Saturday primetime editions only)
- Sponsored by: Humana
- Website: opry.com

The Grand Ole Opry is a regular live country-music radio broadcast originating from Nashville, Tennessee, on WSM, held between two and five nights per week, depending on the time of year. It was founded on November 28, 1925, by George D. Hay as the WSM Barn Dance, taking its current name in 1927. Currently owned and operated by Opry Entertainment (a joint venture between NBCUniversal, Atairos and majority shareholder Ryman Hospitality Properties), it is the longest-running radio broadcast in U.S. history. Dedicated to honoring country music and its history, the Opry showcases a mix of famous singers and contemporary chart-toppers performing country, bluegrass, Americana, folk, and gospel music as well as comedic performances and skits. It attracts hundreds of thousands of visitors from around the world and millions of radio and internet listeners.

In the 1930s, the show began hiring professionals and expanded to four hours. Broadcasting by then at 50,000 watts, WSM made the program a Saturday night musical tradition in nearly 30 states. In 1939, it debuted nationally on NBC Radio. The Opry moved to its most famous former home, the Ryman Auditorium, in 1943. As it developed in importance, so did the city of Nashville, which became America's "country music capital". The Grand Ole Opry holds such significance in Nashville that it is included as a "home of" mention on the welcome signs seen by motorists at the Metro Nashville/Davidson County line.

Membership in the Opry remains one of country music's crowning achievements. Just over 225 acts have been members of the Grand Ole Opry out of the thousands of acts that have existed during the history of country music. At present (2024), about 75 acts are members. As Tina Benitez-Evans wrote in American Songwriter, "Membership in the Grand Ole Opry is one of the highest achievements within the country music community."

Since 1974, the show has been broadcast from the Grand Ole Opry House east of downtown Nashville, with an annual three-month winter foray back to the Ryman from 1999 to 2020, and again for shorter winter residencies beginning in 2023. In addition to the radio programs, performances have been sporadically televised over the years, originally on The Nashville Network, and later CMT, GAC, and Circle. As of 2025, video compilations of previous Opry performances (dubbed "Opry Live") are distributed digitally every Saturday evening on FAST network Circle Country as well as the Opry's YouTube and Facebook outlets, and syndicated to a number of television stations across North America.

== History ==
=== Beginnings ===
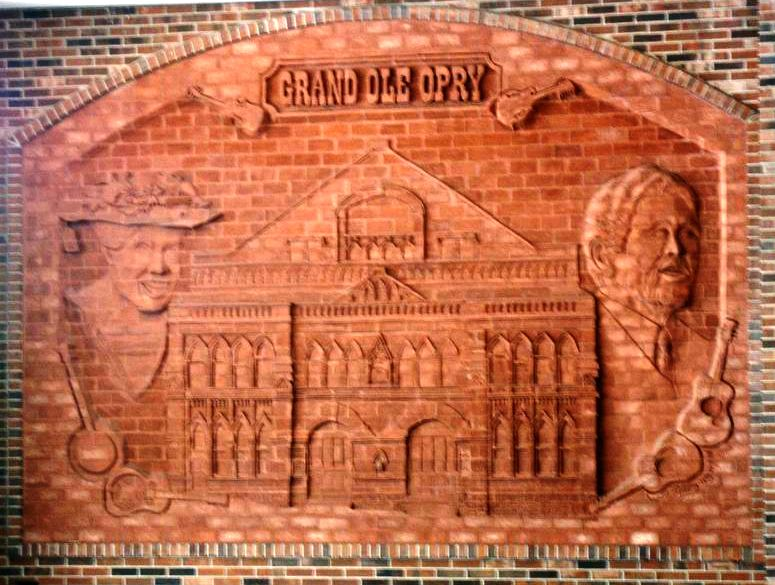
Decorative brickwork at Opryland Hotel depicting Ryman Auditorium with Minnie Pearl and Roy Acuff

The Grand Ole Opry started as the WSM Barn Dance in the new fifth-floor radio studio of the National Life & Accident Insurance Company in downtown Nashville on November 28, 1925. On October 17, 1925, management began a program featuring "Dr. Humphrey Bate and his string quartet of old-time musicians." On November 2, WSM hired long-time announcer and program director George D. Hay, an enterprising pioneer from the National Barn Dance program at WLS in Chicago, who was also named the most popular radio announcer in America as a result of his radio work with both WLS and WMC in Memphis, Tennessee. Though only 29 when he was hired by WSM and turned 30 a week later, Hay (known as the "Solemn Old Judge") launched the WSM Barn Dance with 77-year-old fiddler Uncle Jimmy Thompson on November 28, 1925, and that date is celebrated as the day the Grand Ole Opry began.

Some of the bands regularly on the show during its early days included Bill Monroe, the Possum Hunters (with Humphrey Bate), the Fruit Jar Drinkers with Uncle Dave Macon, the Crook Brothers, the Binkley Brothers' Dixie Clodhoppers, Sid Harkreader, DeFord Bailey, Fiddlin' Arthur Smith, and the Gully Jumpers.

Judge Hay liked the Fruit Jar Drinkers and asked them to appear last on each show because he wanted to always close each segment with "red hot fiddle playing". They were the second band accepted on Barn Dance, with the Crook Brothers being the first. When the Opry began having square dancers on the show, the Fruit Jar Drinkers always played for them. In 1926, Uncle Dave Macon, a Tennessee banjo player who had recorded several songs and toured on the vaudeville circuit, became its first real star.

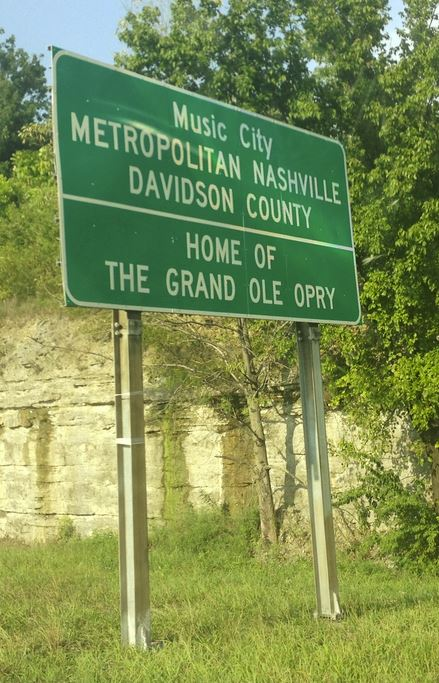
Signs welcoming motorists to Nashville on all major roadways include the phrase "Home of the Grand Ole Opry".

=== Name ===
The phrase "Grand Ole Opry" was first uttered on radio on December 10, 1927. At the time, the NBC Red Network's Music Appreciation Hour, a program with classical music and selections from grand opera, was followed by Hay's Barn Dance. That evening, as he was introducing DeFord Bailey, the show's first performer of the night, George Hay said the following words: "For the past hour, we have been listening to music largely from Grand Opera, but from now on, we will present 'The Grand Ole Opry'."

=== Larger venues ===
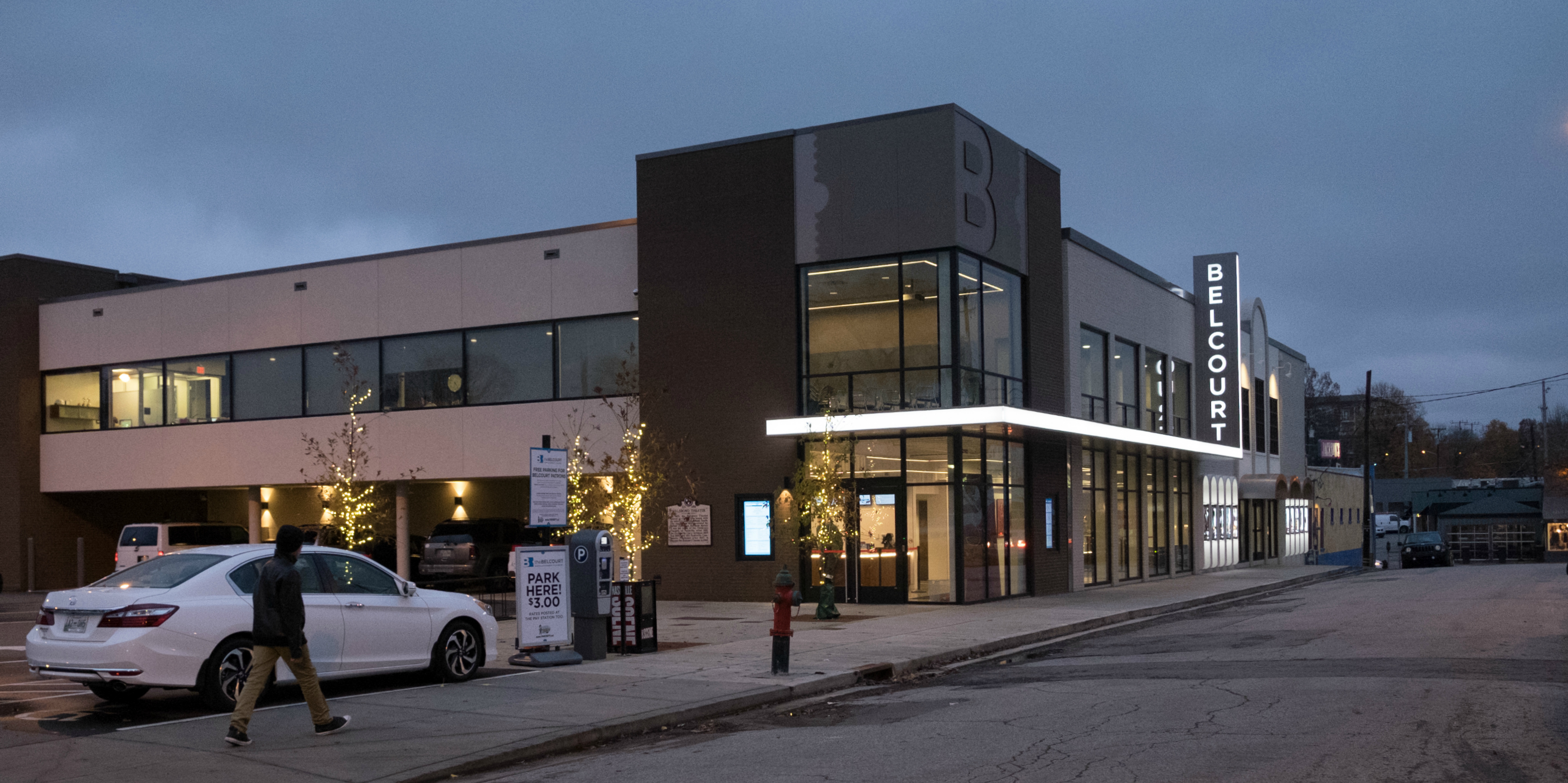
The Hillsboro Theatre (now the Belcourt Theatre), home of the Grand Ole Opry from 1934 to 1936

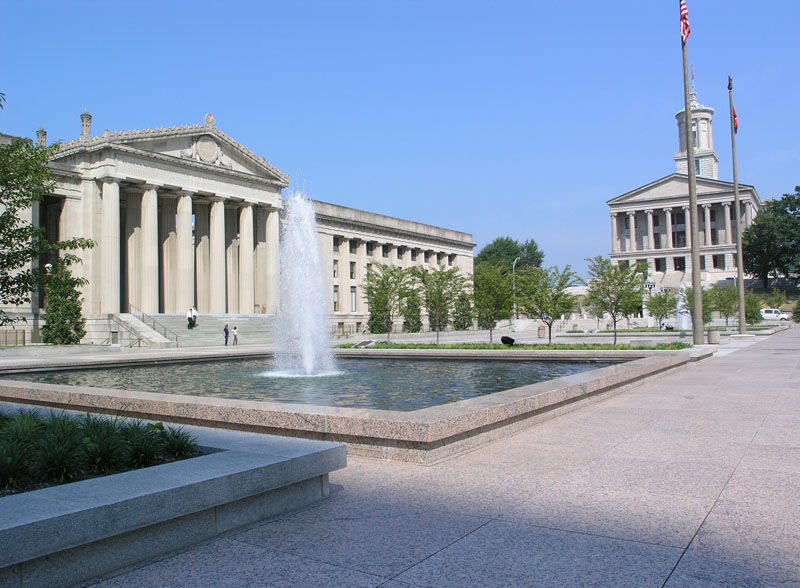
The War Memorial Auditorium, home of the Grand Ole Opry from 1939 to 1943

As audiences for the live show increased, National Life & Accident Insurance's radio venue became too small to accommodate the hordes of fans. They built a larger studio, but it was still not large enough. After several months broadcasting with no live audience, National Life decided to allow the show to move outside its home offices. In October 1934, the Opry moved into then-suburban Hillsboro Theatre (now the Belcourt) before moving to the Dixie Tabernacle in East Nashville on June 13, 1936. The Opry then moved to the War Memorial Auditorium, a downtown venue adjacent to the State Capitol, and a 25-cent admission fee was charged to try to curb the large crowds, but to no avail. In June 1943, the Opry moved to the Ryman Auditorium.

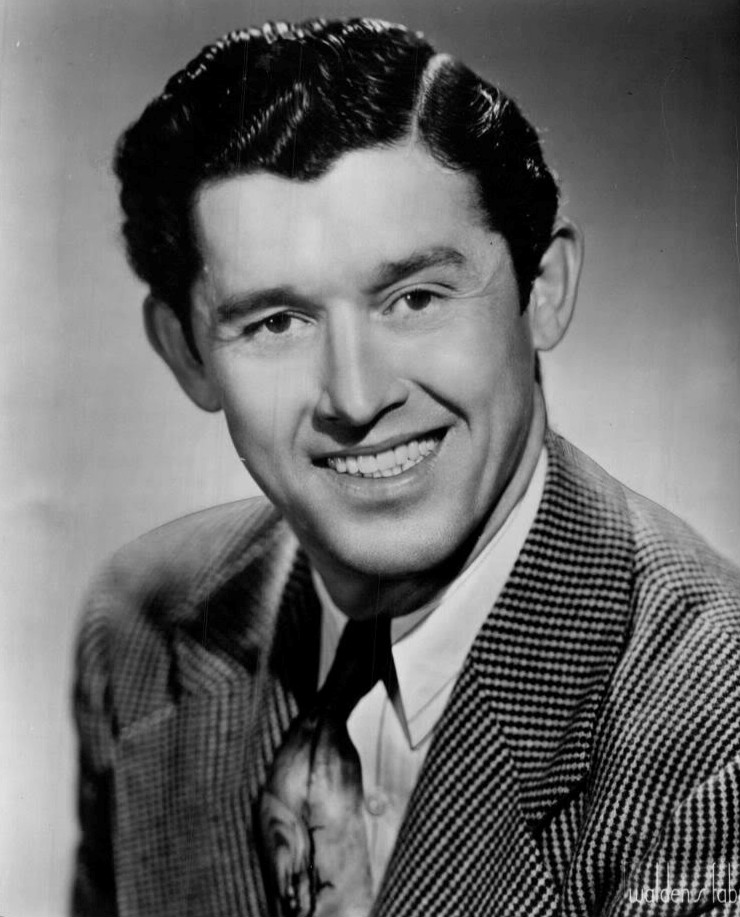
Roy Acuff

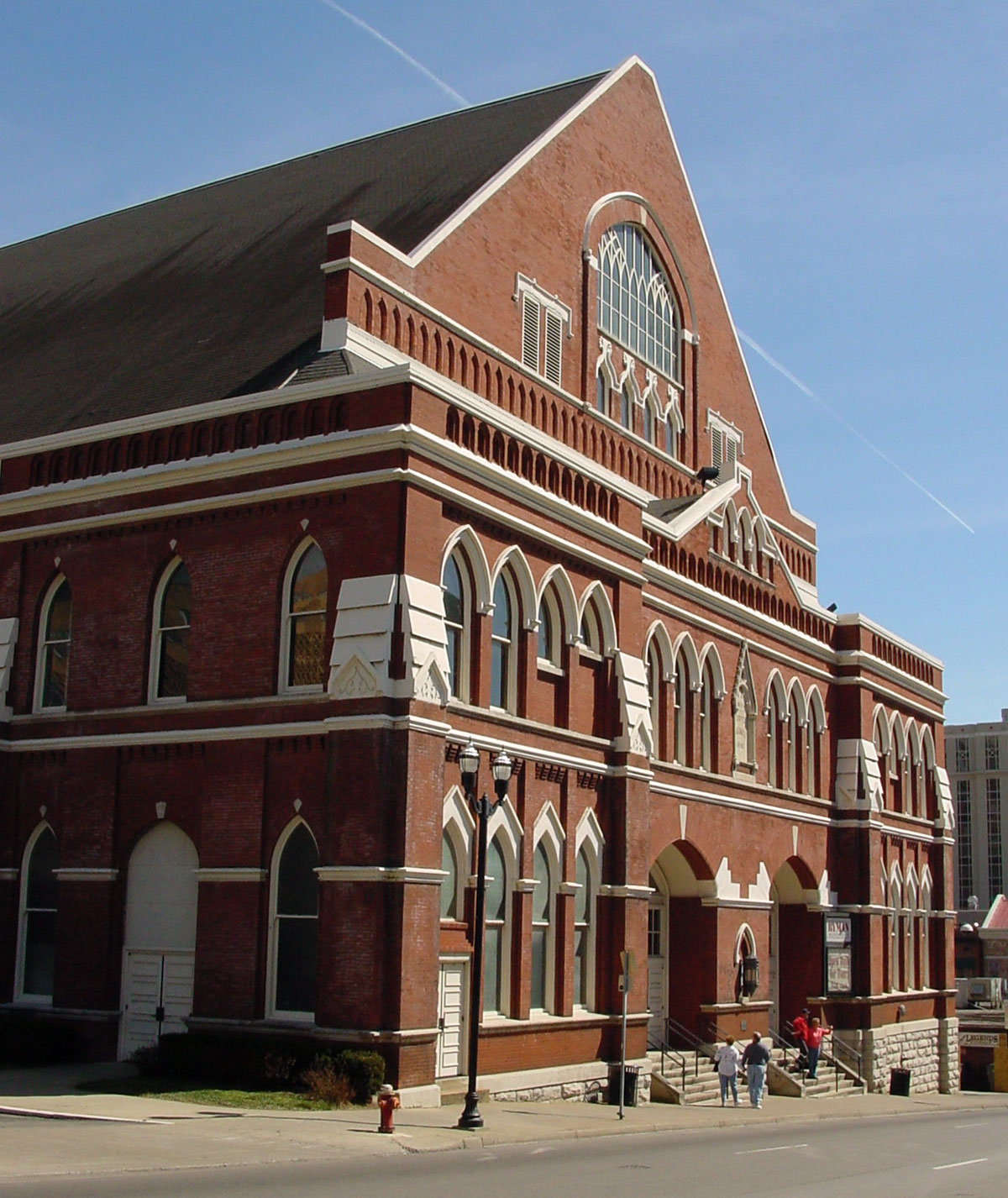
Ryman Auditorium, the "Mother Church of Country Music", home of the Grand Ole Opry from 1943 to 1974, and seasonally since 1999

One hour of the Opry was nationally broadcast by the NBC Red Network from 1939 to 1956, and for much of its run, it aired one hour after the program that had inspired it, National Barn Dance. The NBC segment, originally known by the name of its sponsor, The Prince Albert Show, was first hosted by Acuff, who was succeeded by Red Foley from 1946 to 1954. From October 15, 1955, to September 1956, ABC-TV aired a live, hour-long television version once a month on Saturday nights (sponsored by Ralston-Purina) that pre-empted one hour of the then-90-minute Ozark Jubilee. From 1955 to 1957, Al Gannaway owned and produced both The Country Show and Stars of the Grand Ole Opry, both filmed programs syndicated by Flamingo Films, a company Al Gannaway acquired. Gannaway still owns the right to these shows; furthermore, Gannaway Stars of the Grand Ole Opry was the first television show shot in color.

On October 2, 1954, nineteen year old Elvis Presley made his first and only appearance at the Grand Ole Opry; although the audience reacted politely to Presley's revolutionary brand of rockabilly music, Opry manager Jim Denny told record producer Sam Phillips after the show that the singer's style was not suited to the program.

=== 1960s ===
As the hippie counterculture movement spread across the country during the 1960s, the Opry maintained a strait-laced, conservative image with "longhairs" not being featured on the show. Artists were expected to dress conservatively, with women regularly wearing gingham country dresses; Jeannie Seely, upon joining the Opry in 1967, fought management to wear more contemporary attire such as miniskirts and go-go boots, arguing that if the Opry were going to have a dress code, it should be enforced upon the audience as well and that she was only wearing what most young women of the time were wearing. Seely's actions effectively caused the fall of a gingham curtain. Despite her disputes with the dress code, Seely would remain loyal to the Opry; she would make over 5,300 appearances on the program over her 58 years as a member, ending upon her death in 2025.

The Byrds were a notable exception. Country rock pioneer Gram Parsons, who was a member of the group at the time, was in Nashville to work on the band's country rock album, Sweetheart of the Rodeo. The band's record label, Columbia Records, had arranged for The Byrds to perform at the Ryman on March 15, 1968, a prospect that thrilled Parsons. However, when the band took the stage the audience's response was immediately hostile, resulting in derisive heckling, booing, and mocking calls of "tweet, tweet" and "cut your hair" The Byrds further outraged the Opry establishment by ignoring accepted protocol when they performed Parsons' song "Hickory Wind" instead of the Merle Haggard song "Life in Prison", as had been announced by Tompall Glaser. Two decades later, long after Parsons' death, members of The Byrds reconciled with the Opry and collaborated on the 1989 album Will the Circle Be Unbroken: Volume Two.

Another artist that ran afoul of the Opry's stringent standards was Jerry Lee Lewis, who made his first appearance on the show on January 20, 1973, after several years of success on the country charts. Lewis was given two conditions by management for his Opry appearance – no rock and roll and no profanity – and he proceeded to disregard both, even referring to himself as a "motherfucker" at one point. In a continuous 40-minute set, Lewis played a mixture of his rock and roll hits and covers of other singers' country songs. It has been said that he was bitter about how he was treated when he first arrived in Nashville in 1955 and he supposedly used his Opry appearance to exact revenge on the Nashville music industry.

Country legend Johnny Cash, who made his Opry debut on July 5, 1956 and met his future wife June Carter Cash on that day, was banned from the program in 1965 after drunkenly smashing the stage lights with the microphone stand. Cash commented on the incident years later: "I don't know how much they wanted me in the first place," he says, "but the night I broke all the stage lights with the microphone stand, they said they couldn't use me anymore. So I went out and used it as an excuse to really get wild and ended up in the hospital, the third time I broke my nose." In 1968, Cash was allowed to return, after the success of his At Folsom Prison album and his recovery from addiction.

=== Grand Ole Opry House ===
- Grand Ole Opry House
- U.S. National Register of Historic Places
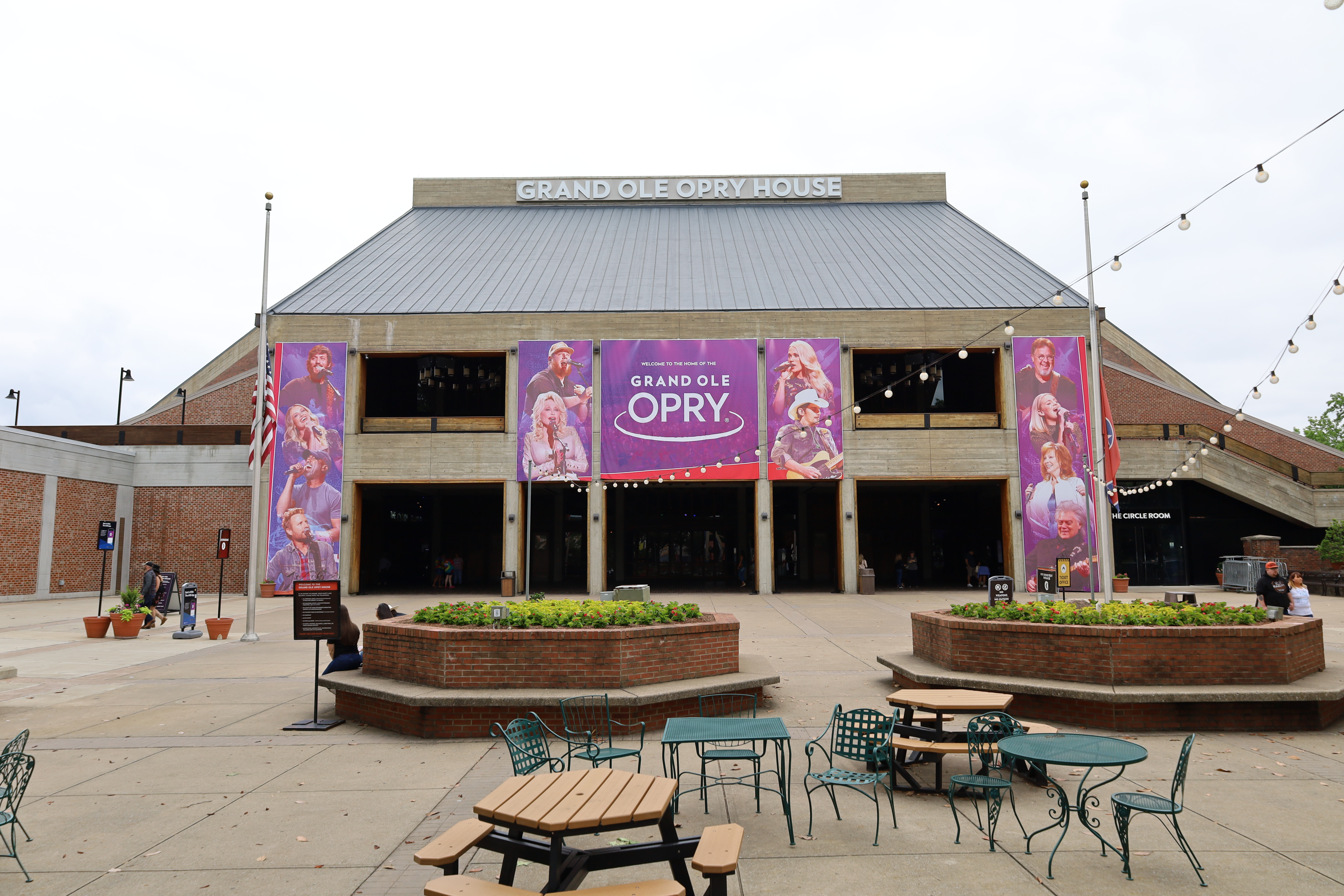
- The Grand Ole Opry House in 2022

- Location within Tennessee Location within the United States
- Location: 600 Opry Mills Dr, Nashville, Tennessee 37214
- Coordinates: 36°12′25″N 86°41′32″W
- Area: 4 acres (approx.)
- Built: 1972–74
- Architects: Welton Becket & Associates; Pierre Cabrol
- Architectural style: Modern/Brutalist
- Restored: 2010 (flood damage remediation)
- NRHP reference No.: 14001222
- Added to NRHP: January 27, 2015

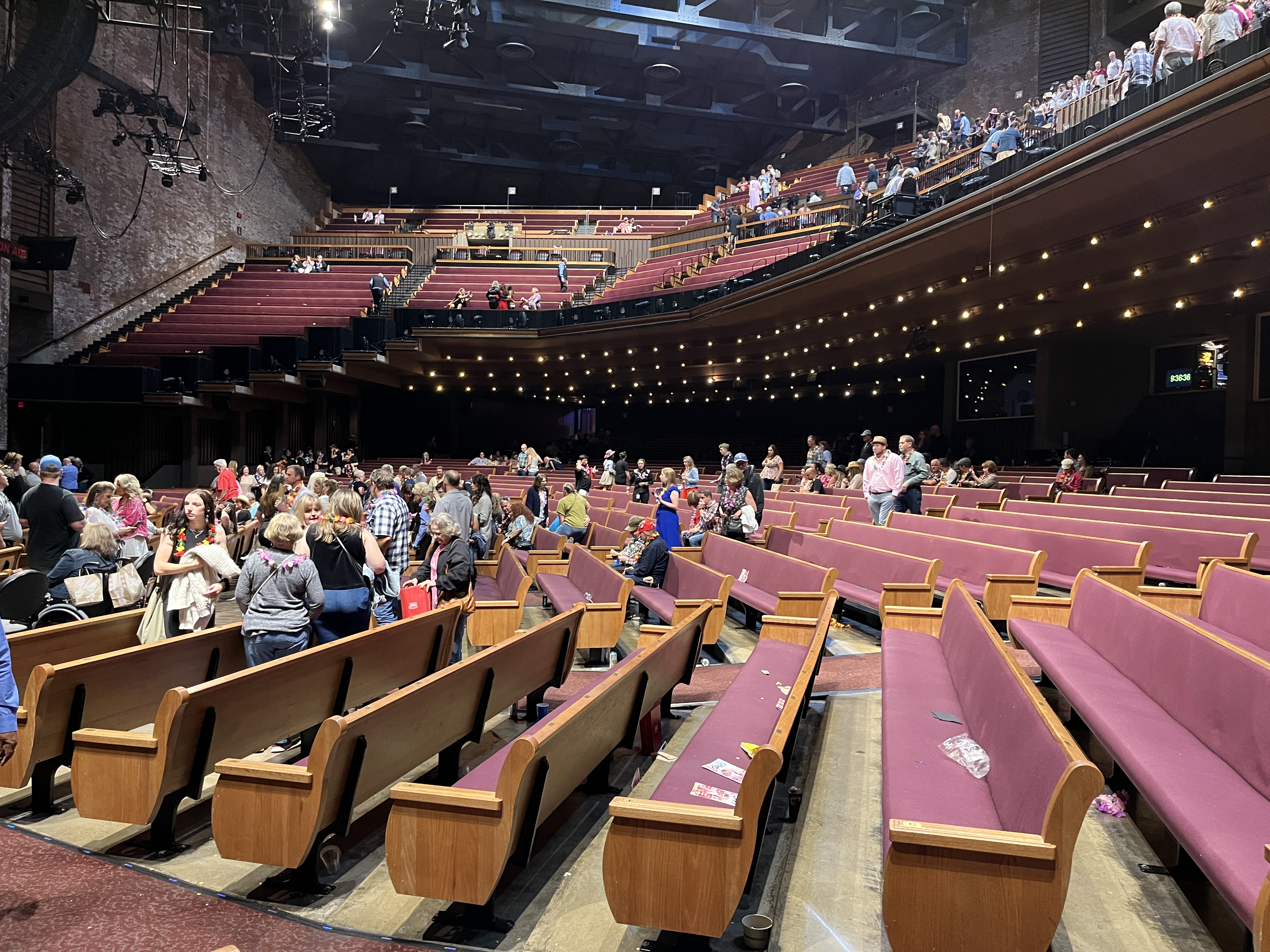
Interior in 2022

Ryman Auditorium was home to the Opry until 1974. By the late 1960s, National Life & Accident desired a new, larger, more modern home for the long-running radio show. Already 51 years old at the time the Opry moved there, the Ryman was beginning to suffer from disrepair as the downtown neighborhood around it fell victim to increasing urban decay. Despite these shortcomings, the show's popularity continued to increase, and its weekly crowds were outgrowing the 2,362-seat venue. The Opry's operators wanted to build a new air-conditioned theater, with greater seating capacity, ample parking, and the ability to serve as a television production facility. Their ideal location would be in a less urbanized part of town to provide visitors with a "safer, more controlled, and more enjoyable experience".

National Life & Accident purchased farmland owned by a local sausage manufacturer (Rudy's Farm) in the Pennington Bend area of Nashville, nine miles east of downtown and adjacent to the newly constructed Briley Parkway. The new Opry venue was the centerpiece of a grand entertainment complex at that location, which later included Opryland USA Theme Park and Opryland Hotel. The theme park opened to the public on June 30, 1972, well ahead of the 4,000-seat Opry House, which debuted nearly two years later, on Saturday, March 16, 1974. The last show of the Grand Ole Opry at the Ryman Auditorium was held on March 15, 1974.

Opening night was attended by sitting U.S. President Richard Nixon, who played a few songs on the piano. To carry on the tradition of the show's run at the Ryman, a six-foot circle of oak was cut from the corner of the Ryman's stage and inlaid into center stage at the new venue. Artists on stage usually stood on the circle as they performed, and most modern performers still follow this tradition.

The theme park was closed and demolished following the 1997 season, but the Grand Ole Opry House remains in use. The immediate area around it was left intact, even throughout the construction of Opry Mills, which opened in May 2000. The outside was decorated with the commemorative plaques of country music Grammy winners, formerly of Opryland's StarWalk, until the display was retired, reconfigured, and moved downtown to become the Music City Walk of Fame in 2006.

The Grand Ole Opry continues to be performed every Tuesday, Friday, Saturday, and occasionally Wednesday and Sunday at the Grand Ole Opry House. The site was added to the National Register of Historic Places on January 27, 2015.

The Grand Ole Opry House was also the home of the Country Music Association Awards from 1974 to 2004, and hosted three weeks of tapings for the long-running game show Wheel of Fortune in 2003. The three weeks are: Country music stars week, Nashville week and sweethearts weeks. The venue has also been the site of the GMA Dove Awards on multiple occasions.

On December 21, 2018, the backstage band room of the Opry Band, which provides backing for visiting musicians, was officially named the Jimmy Capps Music Room in honor of Capps's 60th anniversary on the Opry.

=== Return to Ryman Auditorium ===
Following the departure of the Opry, Ryman Auditorium sat mostly vacant and decaying for 20 years. An initial effort by National Life & Accident to tear down the Ryman and use its bricks to build a chapel at Opryland USA was met with resounding resistance from the public, including many influential musicians of the time. The plans were abandoned, and the building remained standing with an uncertain future. Despite the absence of performances, the building remained a tourist attraction throughout the remainder of the 1970s and 1980s.

In 1991 and 1992, Emmylou Harris performed a series of concerts there and released some of the recordings as an album entitled At the Ryman. The concert and album's high acclaim renewed interest in reviving Ryman Auditorium as an active venue. Beginning in September 1993, Gaylord Entertainment initiated a full renovation of the Ryman, restoring it to a world-class concert hall that reopened with a broadcast of A Prairie Home Companion on June 4, 1994.

On Sunday, October 18, 1998, the Opry held a benefit show at Ryman Auditorium, marking its return to the venue for the first time since its final show on March 15, 1974.

Beginning in November 1999, the Opry was held at Ryman Auditorium for three months, partly due to the ongoing construction of Opry Mills. The Opry returned to the Ryman for the three winter months every year until 2019–20, allowing the show to acknowledge its roots while also taking advantage of a smaller venue during an off-peak season for tourism. Following a COVID-19 pandemic-related hiatus after the 2020 season, the show has returned to The Ryman for shorter winter residencies since 2023. While still officially the Grand Ole Opry, the shows there are billed as Opry at the Ryman. From 2002 to 2014, a traveling version of the Radio City Christmas Spectacular took up residence at the Grand Ole Opry House each holiday season while the Opry was away. It was replaced by Dr. Seuss' How the Grinch Stole Christmas! The Musical from 2015 in 2017 and by Cirque Dreams Holidaze in 2018.

=== 2010 flooding ===
Grand Ole Opry logo used from 2005 to 2015

In May 2010, the Opry House was flooded, along with much of Nashville, when the Cumberland River overflowed its banks. Repairs were made, and the Opry itself remained uninterrupted. Over the course of the summer of 2010, the broadcast temporarily originated from alternate venues in Nashville, with Ryman Auditorium hosting the majority of the shows. Other venues included TPAC War Memorial Auditorium, another former Opry home; TPAC's Andrew Jackson Hall; Nashville Municipal Auditorium; Allen Arena at Lipscomb University; and Two Rivers Baptist Church.

Much of the auditorium's main floor seating, the backstage areas, and the entire stage—including the six foot inlaid circle of wood from Ryman's stage—was underwater during the flood. While the Grand Ole Opry House's stage was replaced, the Ryman circle was restored and again placed at center stage in the Grand Ole Opry House before shows resumed. The renovations following the flood also resulted in an updated and much-expanded backstage area, including the construction of more dressing rooms and a performer's lounge. The Opry returned to the Grand Ole Opry House on September 28, 2010, in a special edition of the Opry entitled Country Comes Home that was televised live on Great American Country.

=== COVID-19 pandemic response ===
The Opry closed its doors to spectators and trimmed its staff in March 2020 as a result of the COVID-19 pandemic in Tennessee but continued to air weekly episodes on radio and television, relying on advertising revenue to remain solvent. The Opry resumed allowing spectators on a limited basis in October, and resumed full operations in May 2021. Due to the restrictions, the show did not move to the Ryman Auditorium in November 2020 as was customary. The Winter Ryman residency did not resume in 2021–22, partly due to scheduling conflicts from Ryman concerts postponed during the pandemic closure.

The Opry livestreams were celebrated by viewers as something to look forward to during the pandemic, with the majority of viewers being under lockdown. According to Pollstar, Opry Live was the number one most-watched livestream series in 2020 across all genres and received more than fifty million viewers from over fifty countries throughout the year, with two individual episodes (Vince Gill/Reba McEntire and Brad Paisley/Carrie Underwood) placing at numbers nine and ten respectively in the top ten. President of Opry Entertainment Scott Bailey explained that "as the stewards of the Grand Ole Opry, it was never a question of if the Opry would play on, but how could it provide a safe and much-needed source of comfort during what has been an extraordinary year around the world. We are proud of this tremendous result and the numbers of viewers who have tuned in, not only for what it has meant for Circle, but also for what it says about the country music genre and country music fans. On behalf of all of us at the Grand Ole Opry and Opry Entertainment, I'd like to thank the artist community, industry and music lovers around the world for their continued support".

After seven months of performing without a live audience, in October 2020, the Opry kicked off its 95th anniversary by welcoming back 500 guests to the Opry House – and so began a month-long celebration of the Opry, country music, its artists, and its fans.

The Grand Ole Opry celebrated its 5,000th Saturday night show on October 30, 2021, with performances by country superstars and Opry members such as Garth Brooks, Trisha Yearwood, Darius Rucker, Vince Gill, Chris Young and several others.

=== Current ===
NBCUniversal and Atairos acquired a combined 30% stake in the Grand Ole Opry and its parent company Opry Entertainment Group in 2022. The crossover allows for NBCUniversal's television outlets, including NBC, to carry several Opry television specials. Ryman announced that it was exploring the sale of its remaining stake in the Opry, WSM, and its home venues in June 2026.

A memorial concert was held for longtime member Loretta Lynn a few weeks after Lynn's death in October 2023; the concert featured performances by George Strait (who himself has only appeared once, in 1982, on the Opry radio show), Tanya Tucker, Wynonna, and several other artists. Thousands of Lynn's friends, family, and fans were in attendance at the Opry House.

The Opry unveiled a new, upgraded stage with all-new, advanced audio technology – the first major updates to the set in over two decades – in February 2023. Opry NextStage, a program that spotlights a select number of up-and-coming country artists each year, began bringing younger and more diverse acts to the Opry stage in 2019. Artists from more genres like folk, Americana, gospel, blues, and Southern rock frequently appear on the show. In 2022, Opry management invited two new comedians – Henry Cho (the Opry's first Asian American member) and Gary Mule Deer – to become Opry members.

=== Opry 100 ===
The Opry celebrated its 100th birthday with a concert special hosted by Blake Shelton which featured over 50 of the Opry's living members in attendance. Opry 100: A Live Celebration aired on NBC on March 19, 2025 and streamed simultaneously on Peacock. The Opry also celebrated by traveling overseas for the very first time, with a show taking place at the Royal Albert Hall in London on September 26 featuring Opry members Luke Combs, Carly Pearce, Ashley McBryde, Marty Stuart, and Darius Rucker, plus local acts Mumford & Sons and Breabach.

On November 28, 2025, the night of the 100th anniversary of the show's debut, two performances were presented, with the later show stretching into the early hours of November 29. The Opry held a special live broadcast for radio, which it simulcast on its social media accounts. Over two dozen Opry members, several of whom had not appeared on the March 19 television special, were featured on the special episode, which chronicled the program's history and featured lesser-emphasized aspects of the Opry's history including instrumental fiddling, gospel, square dancers, Western and bluegrass bands, as well as its photographers, fans, and band members. Both shows that night began with Ricky Skaggs performing "Tennessee Wagoner" on the same fiddle that Uncle Jimmy Thompson played on the Opry's very first show in 1925.

=== January 2026 winter storm ===
On January 24, 2026, during the historic January 2026 North American winter storm that severely impacted Nashville, the Opry canceled the Saturday night stage show as a safety precaution, but continued the streak of live radio broadcasts by originating from the adjacent WSM studio with a skeleton crew and live performances from Opry member Rhonda Vincent and musician/historian Chris Scruggs (a de facto Opry member as part of Marty Stuart's band, The Fabulous Superlatives, and host of the Opry aftershow Friends & Neighbors). Opry members Bill Anderson, Marty Stuart, Connie Smith, and Ashley McBryde appeared on the show via telephone. It marked the first time since the COVID-19 pandemic that an Opry show was performed without a live audience, and the first time since 1934 that the show originated from WSM's primary studio.

== Broadcasts ==
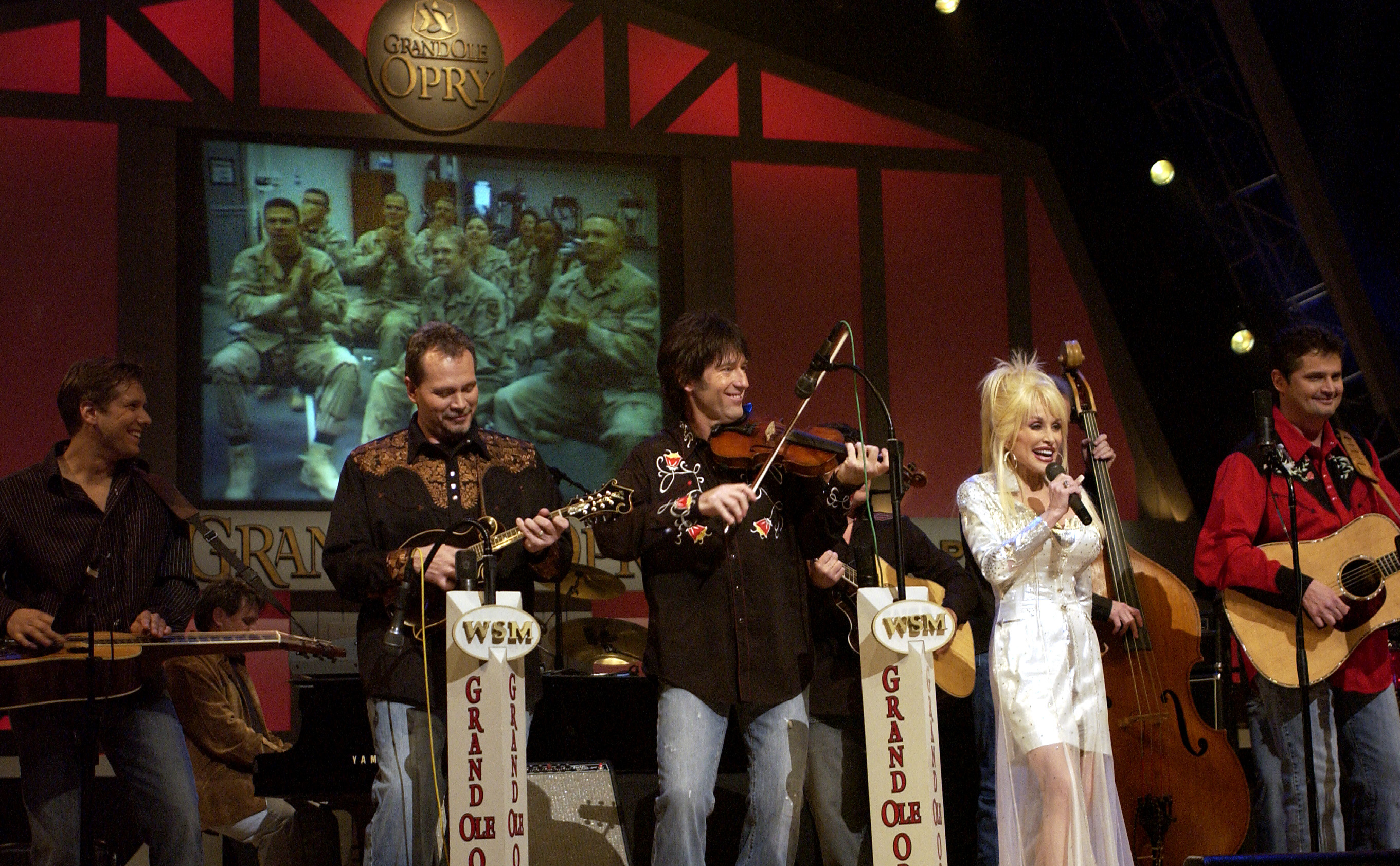
Dolly Parton at the Opry with the Grascals in 2005

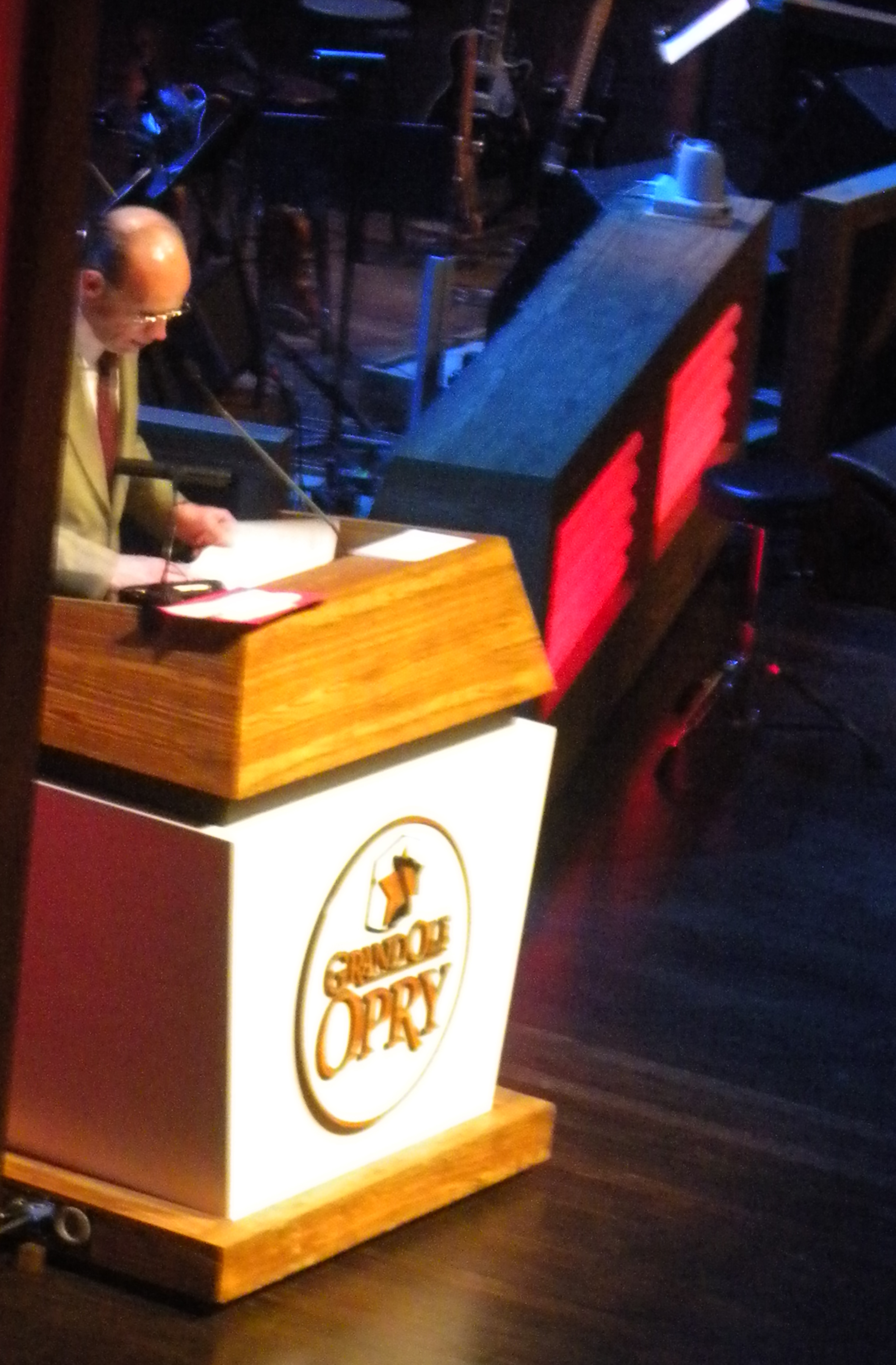
Eddie Stubbs announcing for the Opry in 2012

The Grand Ole Opry is broadcast live on WSM at 7 p.m. CT on Saturday nights, changed from a previous time start of 6:30. A similar program, Friday Night Opry, airs live on Friday nights. From February through December, Tuesday Night Opry is also aired live. Wednesday shows are typically presented in the summer months, while an "Opry Country Classics" program sporadically airs on Thursdays, devoted solely to older artists. Additional Christmas-themed shows, entitled Opry Country Christmas, began production during the 2021 holiday season.

The Opry provides a fourteen-piece house band for performers should they not have a band of their own.

The Opry can also be heard live on Willie's Roadhouse on channel 59 on SiriusXM satellite radio, and the program streams on WSM's website. ABC broadcast the Grand Ole Opry as a monthly series from 1955 to 1956, and PBS televised annual live performances from 1978 to 1981. In 1985, The Nashville Network, co-owned by Gaylord, began airing an edited half-hour version of the program as Grand Ole Opry Live. The show moved to Country Music Television, also owned by Gaylord, where it expanded to an hour, and then to the Great American Country (GAC) cable network, which no longer televised its Opry Live show after both networks channel drifted towards generic Southern lifestyle programming. Circle, a new over-the-air digital subchannel network operated by Gray Television and Ryman Hospitality Properties, resumed telecasting the Opry as its flagship program when it launched in 2020, and former WSM radio sister station WSMV-DT5 is the network's flagship station. Initially simulcasting the radio version, since 2021, the television Opry Live has been pre-recorded live to tape telecasts of recent Opry shows (the show's time slot often coincides with intermission and less demographic-friendly radio segments such as square dancing and audience participation bits). Circle ended its over-the-air operations at the end of 2023, with Opry Live being moved to syndication. RFD-TV carries reruns of Opry telecasts under the title Opry Encore.

Sky Arts simulcasts Opry Live in the United Kingdom.

== Membership ==
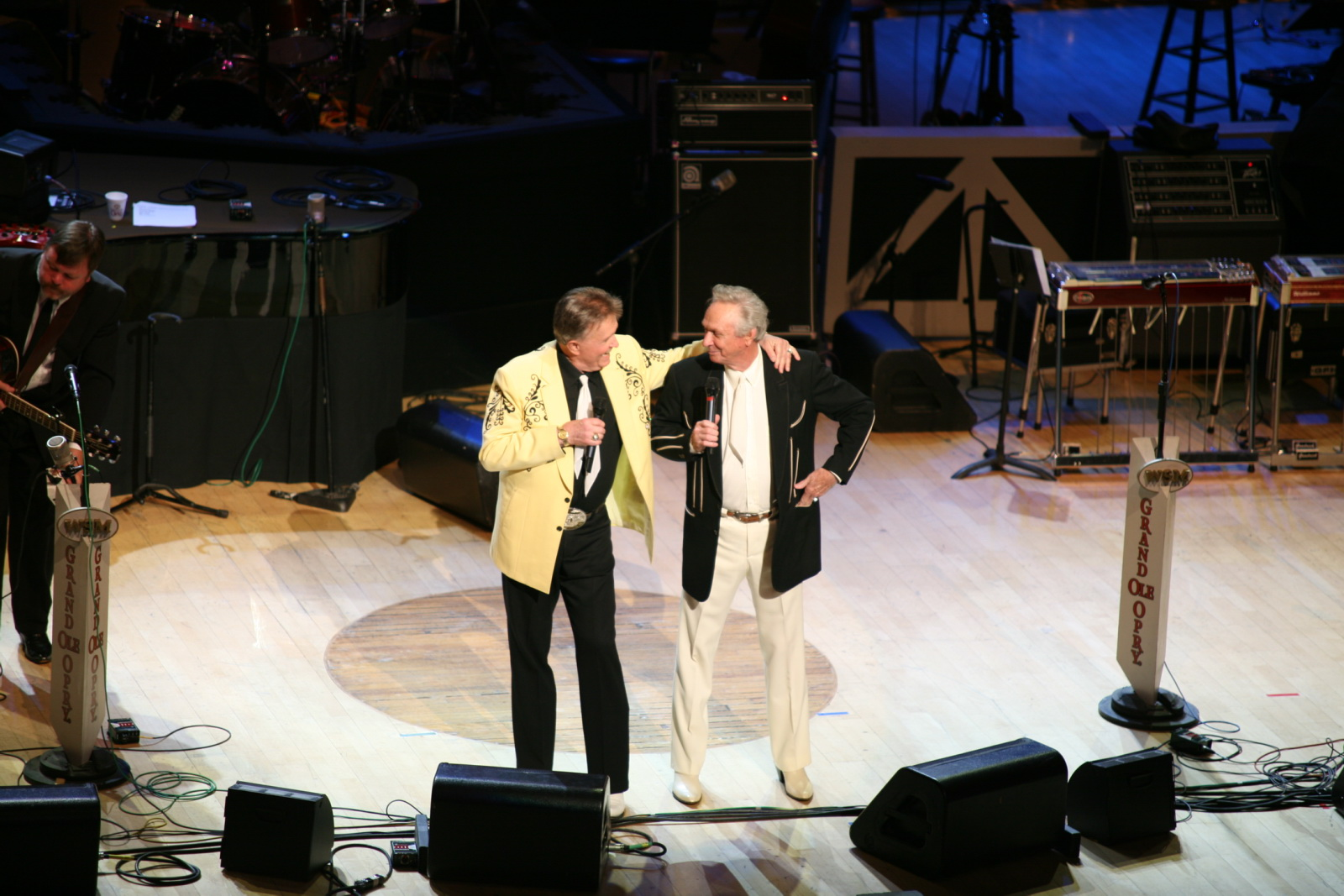
New members are invited to join the Opry by other members. Here, Mel Tillis (right) receives his Opry induction offer from Bill Anderson, 2007.

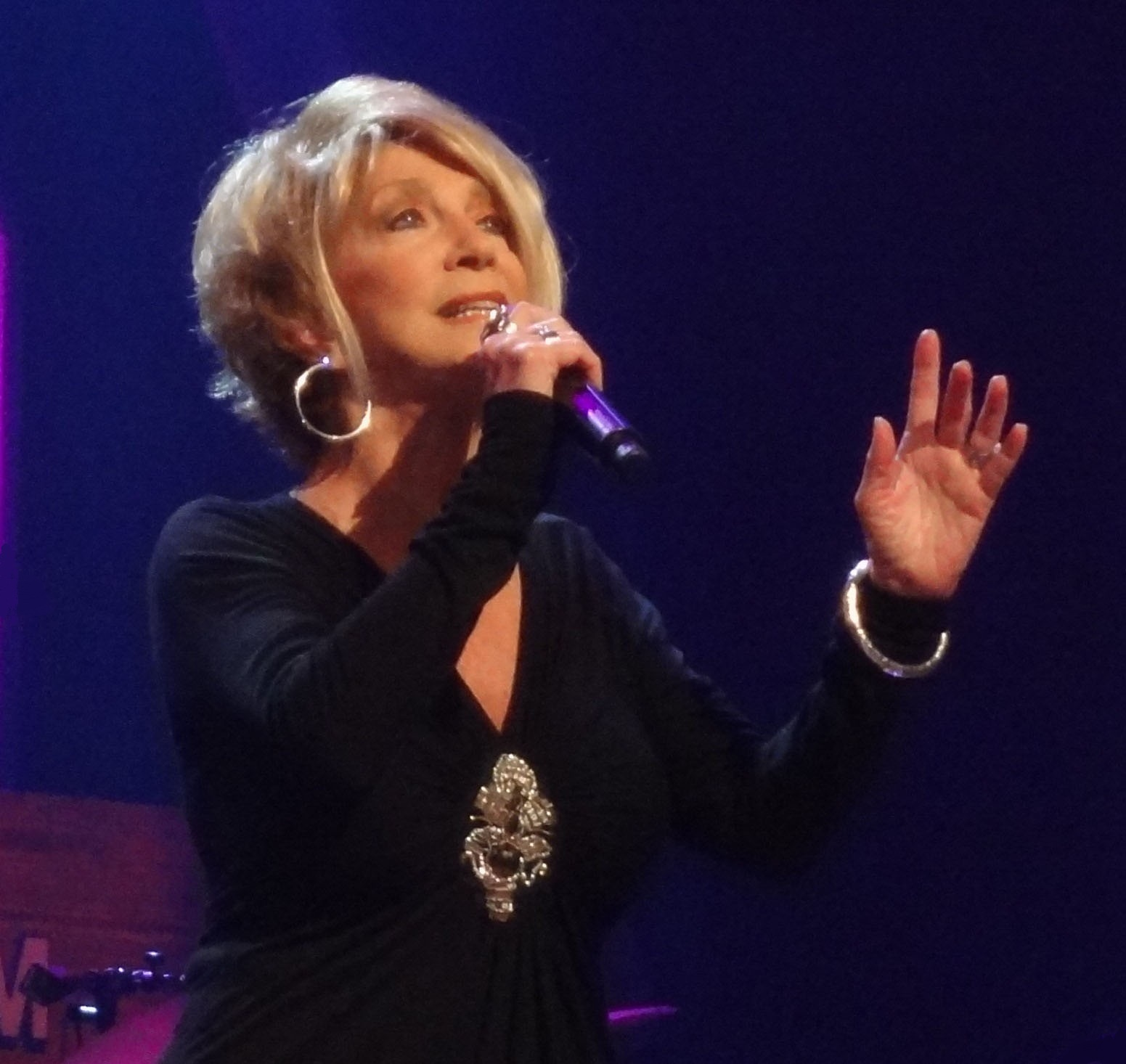
Jeannie Seely (pictured at the Opry in 2012) made over 5,000 appearances on the program, a record, from 1967 until her 2025 death.

Regular performers at the Grand Ole Opry can be inducted into the organization as a member. Opry management, when it decides to induct a new member, directs an existing member to publicly ask them to join, usually during a live episode; an induction ceremony happens several weeks later, where the inductee is presented with a trophy and gives an acceptance speech. As the Opry is a running series, membership in the show's cast must be maintained throughout an artist's career, through frequent performances, and expires when the performer dies. Only once has a member been inducted posthumously: Keith Whitley, who was scheduled to be invited three weeks after his death in May 1989, was retroactively classified as a member in October 2023. Duos and groups remain members until all members have died; following the death of a member, the others maintain Opry membership. More recent protocols have allowed performers who are incapacitated or retired (such as Barbara Mandrell, Jeanne Pruett and Ricky Van Shelton) to maintain Opry membership until they die. Randy Travis has maintained his Opry membership largely through non-singing appearances since his 2013 stroke, while Loretta Lynn was granted similar accommodation from 2017 until her 2022 death. The Opry maintains a wall of fame listing every member of the Opry in the show's history. Receiving Opry membership is considered an honor that is similar in prestige to a Hall of Fame induction, with the caveat that a number of prominent country musicians never received it. When Don Schlitz was inducted on August 30, 2022, he became the first-ever member of the Opry inducted for his songwriting and not as a performer, having begun regular appearances only after Travis's incapacitation, performing songs he had written for Travis, Whitley and for non-Opry member Kenny Rogers. The Opry also has a history of inviting comedians to join the cast, though none were invited to join between Jerry Clower's induction in 1973 and when Henry Cho and Gary Mule Deer became members in 2023. As of August 2026 with the death of Dolly Parton, there are 74 active members, plus the Opry Square Dancers, who enjoy sui generis membership status and open every Saturday show.

== Controversies ==
In April 1963, Opry management mandated that members had to perform no less than 26 shows a year in order to maintain their membership. WSM decreased the number of those required performances to 20 in January 1964, and the minimum number was 12 in 2000. Although the minimum number of performances has been reduced over the years, artists offered membership are expected to display their dedication to the Opry with frequent attendance.

Another controversy raged for years over permissible instrumentation, especially the use of drums and electrically amplified instruments. The earliest years of the program featured entirely instrumental string bands and harmonicas; vocalists were not featured on the program until the late 1930s. Some purists were appalled at the prospect; traditionally, a string bass provided the rhythm component in country music, and percussion instruments were seldom used (and then generally limited to hambone and folk instruments such as the spoons). Electric amplification, new in the beginning days of the Opry, was regarded as the province of popular music and jazz in the 1940s. Although the Opry allowed electric guitars and steel guitars by World War II, the restrictions against drums and horns continued, causing a conflict when Bob Wills and Pee Wee King defied the show's ban on drums. Wills openly flouted the rule. King, who performed at the Ryman in 1945 after Franklin Delano Roosevelt's death, did not technically defy the ban. He did not use his drums on the Opry, but this particular Saturday night, the Opry was cancelled due to FDR's death. He and his band were asked to perform their theater show (with their drummer) because a number of fans showed up assuming the Opry would go on. It took years after that before drums became commonly accepted at the Opry; as late as 1967, an item in Billboard claimed that "[a] full set of drums was used on the 'Grand Ole Opry' for the first time in history when Jerry Reed performed last week. Jerry's drummer, Willie Akerman, was allowed to use the entire set during his guest performance there."

Stonewall Jackson, an Opry member since 1956, sued the Opry management in 2007 alleging that manager Pete Fisher was trying to purge older members of the Opry from its membership and committing age discrimination. Jackson settled the lawsuit in 2008 and resumed appearing on the program until retiring in 2012.

In early 2022, Morgan Wallen performed on the Grand Ole Opry alongside Ernest. This move was criticized, as Wallen had been taped less than a year prior shouting a racial slur, and the Opry had previously made stances against racism on social media. In response to the latter, music writer Holly G. founded the Black Opry as a means of raising awareness of black artists in country music.

== Commercialization ==
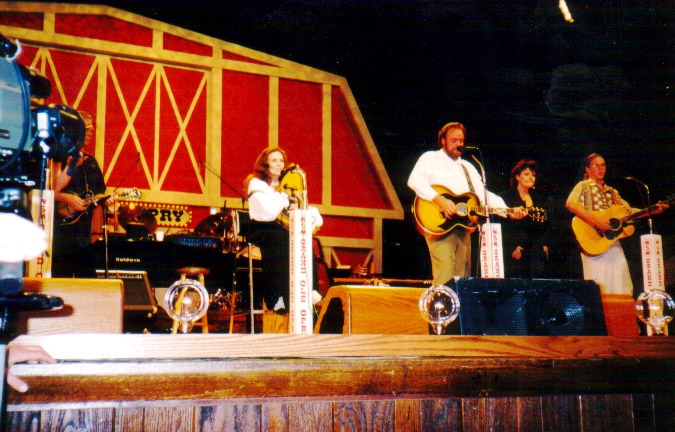
June Carter Cash at the Opry in 1999

The company has enforced its trademark on the name "Grand Ole Opry", with trademark registrations in the United States and in numerous countries around the world. It has taken court action to limit use of the word "Opry"—not directly trademarked—to members of the Opry and products associated with or licensed by it and to discourage use of the word in ways that would imply a connection to the Grand Ole Opry. In late 1968, for instance, WSM sued Opry Records, a record label that was independent of WSM, and the court decided that "the record is replete with newspaper and magazine articles and clippings which demonstrate conclusively that the term 'Opry', standing alone as defendant has used it, is constantly used in country and western music circles in referring to plaintiff's 'Grand Ole Opry'". The court also stated "the defendant has appropriated, at its peril, the dominant or salient term in the plaintiff's mark, a term which identified the 'Grand Ole Opry' in the mind of the public many years before the inception of 'Opry Records'—the name adopted by defendant".

In another case, the Trademark Trial and Appeal Board granted summary judgment that the term "Opry" is a generic term (and thus no more protected than the words "Grand" or "Ole"), but the Federal Circuit court reversed this decision. As recently as 2009, the Trademark Trial and Appeal Board granted judgment against Texas Opry House, LLC, which had filed a trademark application for TEXAS OPRY HOUSE.

In 2004, the Grand Ole Opry sold naming rights to its first "presenting sponsor", Cracker Barrel. Insurance company Humana became a sponsor in September 2007, was the presenting sponsor by no later than January 2010, and still holds that top sponsorship level as of May 2023.

== Honors ==
- Peabody Award, 1983
- National Radio Hall of Fame induction, 1992

== See also ==
- Country Music Association
- Country Music Hall of Fame and Museum
- Midnite Jamboree – Ernest Tubb's long-running Opry aftershow
- Music & the Spoken Word – "The longest-running continuous network radio program in the world" (began July 15, 1929).
