= Charles Sheldon =

American religious leader (1857–1946)

The Reverend Charles Monroe Sheldon
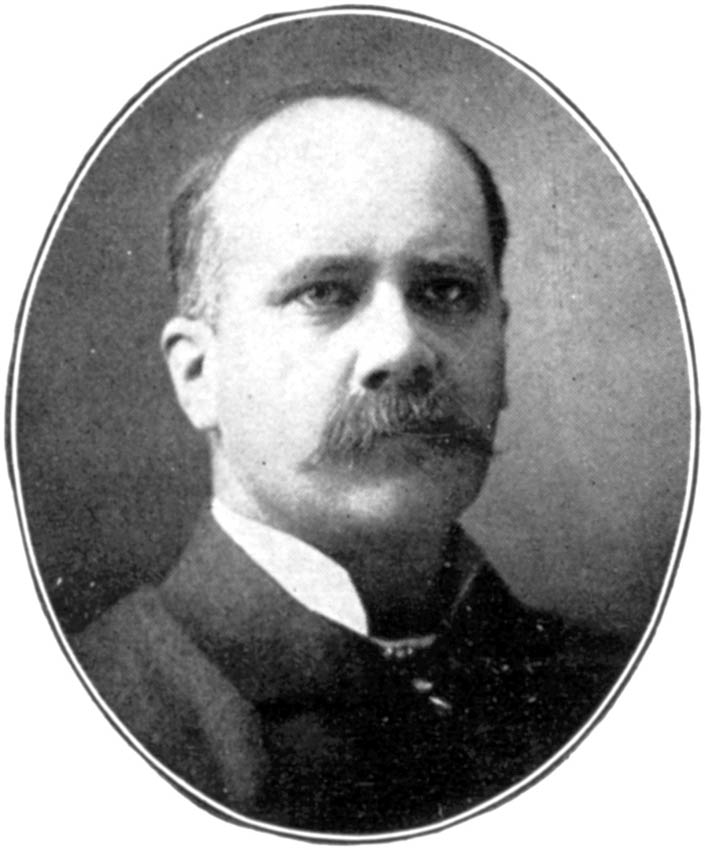
- Born: February 26, 1857; Wellsville, New York, U.S.
- Died: February 24, 1946 (aged 88); Topeka, Kansas, U.S.
- Education: Phillips Academy, Andover
- Known for: Christian socialism The Principle of "What would Jesus do?"
- Notable work: In His Steps

Charles Monroe Sheldon (February 26, 1857 – February 24, 1946) was an American Congregationalist minister and a leader of the Social Gospel movement. His 1896 novel In His Steps introduced the principle "What would Jesus do?", which articulated an approach to Christian theology that became popular at the turn of the 20th century and enjoyed a revival almost one hundred years later. The stretch of US-24 on the north side of Topeka, Kansas, between US-75 and K-4 is named the "Charles Sheldon Trafficway" in his honor.

== Education and ministry ==
Charles Sheldon was born in Wellsville, New York. He was a graduate of Phillips Academy, Andover (class of 1879), and of Brown University in 1883. He pastored a church at Waterbury, Vermont, from 1886 to 1888, and in 1889 became pastor of the Central Congregational Church in Topeka, Kansas.

Sheldon became an advocate of the late-nineteenth-century school of thought known as Christian Socialism. His theological outlook focused on the practicalities of the moral life, de-emphasizing the doctrinal traditions of personal redemption from sin in Christ. In the winter of 1896 Sheldon developed a sermon story that he read as a weekly series from the pulpit of Central Congregational Church. The unifying theme of these sermons was based on asking oneself the question "What would Jesus do?" when facing moral decisions. He viewed this question as central to Christianity, and likely drew some inspiration from William T. Stead's If Christ came to Chicago! (1893) and other earlier sources.

== Novel and theological influence ==
The theme of the sermons was later fictionalized into the novel In His Steps. The central ethos of the novel was not about personal redemption but about moral choices related to encountering circumstances of poverty and deprivation. Sheldon's theological motif reflected his socialist outlook. Sheldon's own parish work became identified with the Social Gospel.

Walter Rauschenbusch, widely viewed as the chief architect of the Social Gospel, acknowledged the importance Sheldon placed on imitating Jesus. He saw the significance of Sheldon's work in bringing home the realization that it is hard to live a Christ-like life, given the temptations of modern society. While Rauschenbusch found this awareness valuable, he saw that it did not demand what he believed was a necessary transformation of social institutions. Sheldon was in touch with the concerns of middle-class America at the end of the century. He saw his role as one of communication—to introduce his congregation and the wider public to the ideas of Lyman Abbott, Richard Ely, George Herron, and Rauschenbusch. That was his intention in writing In His Steps.

Of the social issues Sheldon espoused during his lifetime, the two he was most passionate about were equality and prohibition. He believed that all persons were equal and should be treated as such. He was a pioneer among white Protestant ministers in welcoming Black Americans into a mainstream church. He was also committed to fair treatment for Jews and Catholics, and proclaimed the equality of men and women. A strong supporter of the feminist struggle for equal rights, he urged women to enter politics. He also pushed for full equality in the workplace.

Sheldon was also a vegetarian who promoted compassion towards animals just as he did towards humans. He even criticized circuses for their treatment of animals.

== Newspaper career ==
In March 1900 Sheldon became editor for a week of The Topeka Daily Capital, applying the "What would Jesus do?" concept. In that short time, the newspaper's circulation exploded from just under 12,000 to 387,000, overwhelming the paper's Topeka printing plant and forcing it to outsource the printing of 120,000 copies each to Chicago and New York City.

After his retirement from Central Congregational Church in 1920, Sheldon edited the Christian Herald, An Illustrated News Weekly for the Home, a religious periodical, from 1920 to 1924, and continued to write articles after his final retirement in 1924.

== Renewed interest a century later ==
In the 1990s, around the centennial of the original publication of Sheldon's novel In His Steps, WWJD bracelets became a popular item, especially among young people, and publishers increased sales of the book (which is in the public domain), tying it in with marketing of "What would Jesus do?" items.

A ten-part miniseries produced in 2008 by Topeka PBS affiliate KTWU features an hour-long segment "Beyond Theology: What Would Jesus Do?" which examines how this question might be considered in the context of the political, social, and cultural changes that have taken place in America. The program also looks at the manner in which Sheldon applied the Social Gospel in his own life and in his community.

== List of works ==
- 1892: Richard Bruce; or, the Life That Now Is
- 1893: Robert Hardy's Seven Days: A Dream and Its Consequences
- 1893: The Twentieth Door
- 1894: The Crucifixion of Philip Strong
- 1895: His Brother's Keeper; or, Christian Stewardship
- 1897: In His Steps: "What Would Jesus Do?"
- 1898: The Redemption of Freetown
- 1898: Malcom Kirk: A Tale Of Moral Heroism In Overcoming The World
- 1898: One of the Two: "Be not overcome of evil, but overcome evil with good"
- 1899: John King's Question Class
- 1899: The Miracle at Markham: How Twelve Churches Became One
- 1899: Lend a Hand
- 1899: For Christ and the Church
- 1900: Born to Serve: A story
- 1900: Edward Blake: College Student
- 1901: The Reformer
- 1903: His Mother's Prayers
- 1903: The Narrow Gate
- 1905: The Heart of the World: A Story of Christian Socialism
- 1906: The spirit's power: Or the revival
- 1909: Paul Douglas–Journalist
- 1911: The High Calling
- 1912: A Builder of Ships: The Story of Brander Cushing's Ambition
- 1914: "Jesus is Here!" Continuing the Narrative of "In His Steps (What Would Jesus Do?)" (sequel)
- 1912: In His Steps: A Dramatic Adaptation of the Story (with Frank H. Lane)
- 1916: Howard Chase, Red Hill, Kansas
- 1916: Of One Blood
- 1917: Modern Pagans
- 1919: All The World
- 1920: Heart Stories
- 1921: In His Steps To-day. What would Jesus do in solving the problems of present political, economic and social life?
- 1921: The Richest Man in Kansas
- 1924: The everyday Bible (as editor)
- 1924: The Mere Man and His Problems
- 1925: Charles M. Sheldon: His Life Story (autobiography)
- 1925: Two Old Friends
- 1926: The Life of Jesus
- 1927: Casework Evangelism: Studies in the Art of Christian Personal Work (Introduction only)
- 1928: The 13th Resolution
- 1929: Life's Treasure Book: Past, Present, and Future
- 1941: The Golden Book of Bible Stories: Favorite Stories from the Old and New Testaments Retold for Children
