= Hootie & the Blowfish discography =

List of works by American rock band

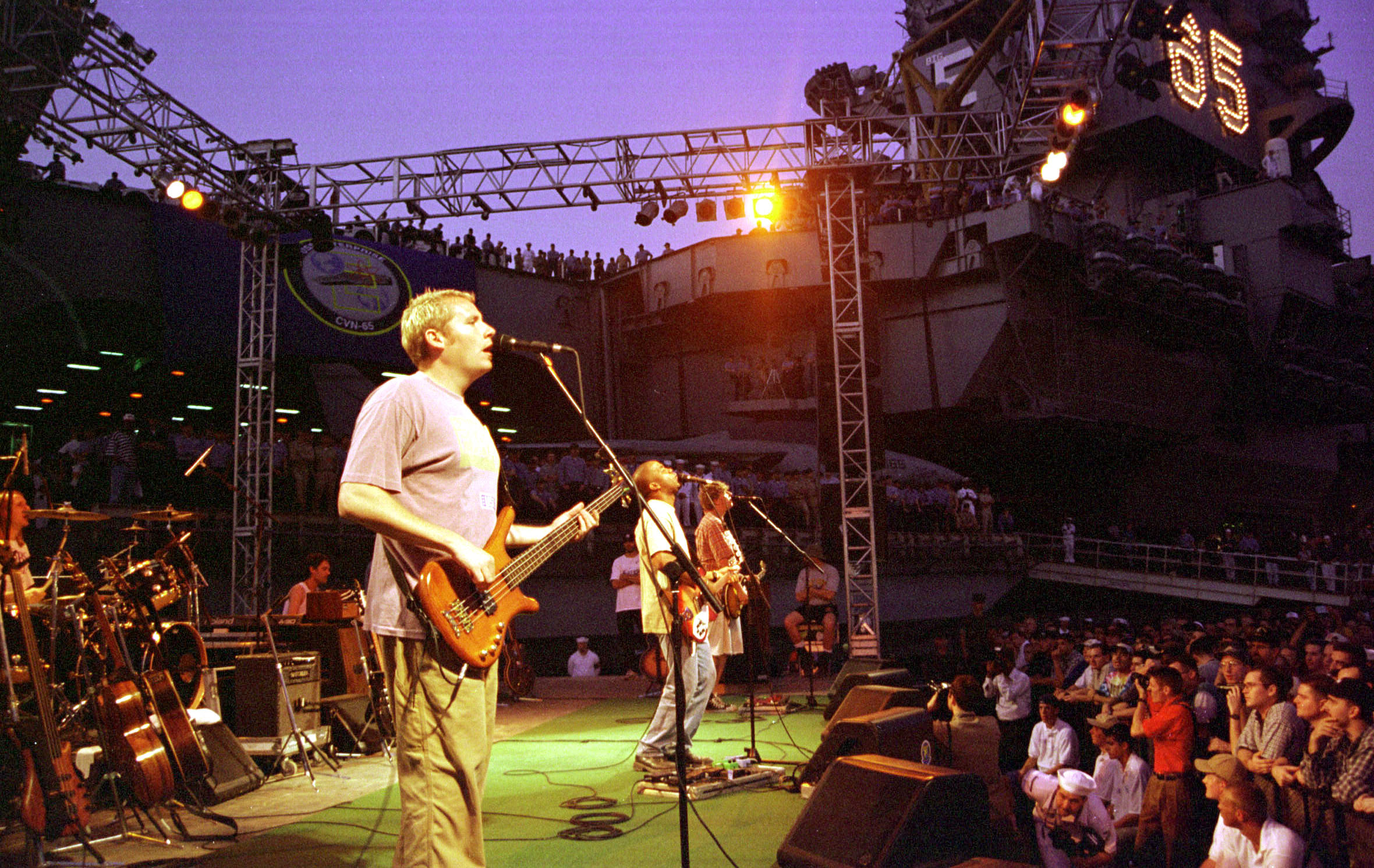
- Hootie & the Blowfish in 1998
- Studio albums: 6
- EPs: 1
- Compilation albums: 3
- Singles: 24

American band Hootie & the Blowfish has released six studio albums, one extended play, three compilation albums, and 24 singles. The band debuted in 1993 with the extended play Kootchypop, followed by their 1994 debut Cracked Rear View. The album reached number one on the Billboard 200 and was certified 22 times platinum by the Recording Industry Association of America (RIAA), honoring shipments of 22 million copies in the United States. It accounted for the singles "Hold My Hand", "Let Her Cry", and "Only Wanna Be with You".

== Albums ==
=== Studio albums ===
Title	Album details	Peak chart positions										Certifications (sales threshold)
Title	Album details	US	US Indie	AUS	CAN	GER	NL	NZ	SWE	SWI	UK	Certifications (sales threshold)
Cracked Rear View	Release date: July 5, 1994; Label: Atlantic	1	—	7	1	45	—	1	—	—	12	RIAA: 2× Diamond (22× Platinum); ARIA: 2× Platinum; BPI: Gold; MC: Diamond; RMNZ: Platinum
Fairweather Johnson	Release date: April 23, 1996; Label: Atlantic	1	—	12	6	41	37	6	36	37	9	RIAA: 3× Platinum; BPI: Gold; RMNZ: Gold
Musical Chairs	Release date: September 15, 1998; Label: Atlantic	4	—	54	27	72	—	20	—	—	15	RIAA: Platinum; BPI: Silver
Hootie & the Blowfish	Release date: March 4, 2003; Label: Atlantic	46	—	—	—	—	—	—	—	—	161	
Looking for Lucky	Release date: August 9, 2005; Label: Vanguard	47	4	—	—	—	—	—	—	—	—	
Imperfect Circle	Release date: November 1, 2019; Label: Capitol Nashville	26	—	— (Note: Imperfect Circle did not enter the ARIA Albums Chart, but peaked at number 24 on the ARIA Digital Album Chart.)	—	—	—	—	—	—	100	
"—" denotes releases that did not chart

=== Compilation albums ===
Title	Album details	Peak chart positions	
Title	Album details	US	US Indie
Scattered, Smothered and Covered	Release date: October 24, 2000; Label: Atlantic	71	—
The Best of Hootie & the Blowfish: 1993–2003	Release date: March 2, 2004; Label: Atlantic, Rhino	62	—
Live in Charleston	Release date: August 8, 2006; Label: Vanguard	—	47
"—" denotes releases that did not chart

== Extended plays ==
- Kootchypop (1993)

== Singles ==
Title	Year	Peak chart positions										Certifications	Album
Title	Year	US	US Main	US AC	US Adult	AUS	CAN	GER	ICE	NZ	UK	Certifications	Album
"Hold My Hand"	1994	10	4	6	25	70	36	—	—	37	50	RMNZ: Platinum	Cracked Rear View
"Let Her Cry"	1994	9	9	6	16	4	2	78	4	19	75	ARIA: Gold; RMNZ: Platinum	Cracked Rear View
"Only Wanna Be with You"	1995	6	2	3	2	40	1	65	4	17	85	RMNZ: 2× Platinum	Cracked Rear View
"Hannah Jane" (Note: "Hannah Jane" was a promotional single.)	1995	—	—	—	—	—	—	—	23	—	—		Cracked Rear View
"Time"	1995	14	26	4	1	—	1	—	9	35	—		Cracked Rear View
"Hey, Hey, What Can I Do" (Note: "Hey, Hey, What Can I Do" was a promotional single.)	1995	—	15	—	—	—	62	—	—	—	—		Encomium: a Tribute to Led Zeppelin
"Drowning"	1995	—	21	—	—	—	—	—	—	—	—		Cracked Rear View
"Old Man & Me (When I Get to Heaven)"	1996	13	6	18	4	60	1	75	8	41	57		Fairweather Johnson
"Tucker's Town"	1996	38	29	24	12	—	2	—	20	—	77		Fairweather Johnson
"I Go Blind" (Note: "I Go Blind" was a promotional single.)	1996	— (Note: "I Go Blind" did not enter the Billboard Hot 100, but peaked at number 13 on the Hot 100 Airplay chart.)	—	22	2	—	13	—	—	—	—		Friends Original TV Soundtrack
"Sad Caper"	1996	— (Note: "Sad Caper" did not enter the Billboard Hot 100, but peaked at number 74 on the Hot 100 Airplay chart.)	—	—	26	—	32	—	—	—	—		Fairweather Johnson
"I Will Wait"	1998	— (Note: "I Will Wait" did not enter the Billboard Hot 100, but peaked at number 18 on the Hot 100 Airplay chart.)	—	28	3	—	7	—	—	—	57		Musical Chairs
"Only Lonely"	1999	—	—	25	29	—	20	—	—	—	169		Musical Chairs
"Wishing"	1999	—	—	—	—	—	—	—	—	—	—		Musical Chairs
"Innocence"	2003	—	—	25	24	—	—	—	—	—	—		Hootie & the Blowfish
"It's Alright"	2003	—	—	—	—	—	—	—	—	—	—		Hootie & the Blowfish
"Goodbye Girl"	2003	—	—	24	—	—	—	—	—	—	—		The Best of Hootie & the Blowfish
"One Love"	2005	—	—	5	20	—	—	—	—	—	—		Looking for Lucky
"Get Out of My Mind"	2006	—	—	17	—	—	—	—	—	—	—		Looking for Lucky
"Hold On"	2019	—	—	—	—	—	—	—	—	—	—		Imperfect Circle
"Miss California"	2019	—	—	—	—	—	—	—	—	—	—		Imperfect Circle
"Losing My Religion"	2020	—	—	—	—	—	—	—	—	—	—		Added to re-release editions of Imperfect Circle
"Won't Be Home for Christmas"	2020	—	—	—	—	—	—	—	—	—	—		Non-album singles
"For What It's Worth"	2024	—	—	—	—	—	—	—	—	—	—		Non-album singles
"Bottle Rockets" (with Scotty McCreery)	2025	32	—	—	—	—	43	—	—	—	—	RIAA: Gold	Scooter & Friends
"—" denotes releases that did not chart

== Soundtrack appearances ==
Year	Single	Album
2000	"Can't Find the Time to Tell You"	Me, Myself & Irene

== Music videos ==
Title	Year	Director
"Hold My Hand"	1994	Adolfo Doring
"Let Her Cry"	1994	Adolfo Doring
"Only Wanna Be with You"	1995	Frank Sacramento
"Time"	1995	Frank Sacramento
"Old Man and Me (When I Get to Heaven)"	1996	Dan Winters
"Tucker's Town"	1996	Greg Masuak
"I Will Wait"	1998	Nigel Dick
"Hold On"	2019	

== See also ==
- Darius Rucker discography
