= The Best of Hootie & the Blowfish: 1993–2003 =

The Best of Hootie & the Blowfish (1993 thru 2003)

Greatest hits album by Hootie & the Blowfish
- Released: March 2, 2004
- Recorded: 1993–2003
- Genre: Rock
- Length: 66:59
- Labels: Atlantic/Rhino; 78083
- Producers: Don Gehman, Don Was

Hootie & the Blowfish chronology
Hootie & the Blowfish (2003)	The Best of Hootie & the Blowfish (1993 thru 2003) (2004)	Looking for Lucky (2005)

Professional ratings
Review scores
Source	Rating
AllMusic	4.5/5 stars
The Encyclopedia of Popular Music	3/5 stars

The Best of Hootie & the Blowfish (1993 thru 2003) is a compilation album by the rock band Hootie & the Blowfish, released in 2004.

== Track listing ==
1. "Hold My Hand" – 4:15
2. "Only Wanna Be with You" – 3:46
3. "Time" – 4:53
4. "Let Her Cry" – 5:08
5. "Not Even the Trees" – 4:37
6. "Old Man & Me (When I Get to Heaven)" – 4:27
7. "Hey, Hey, What Can I Do" – 3:52
8. "Tucker's Town" – 3:45
9. "I Go Blind" – 3:14
10. "Sad Caper" – 2:49
11. "Be the One" – 3:25
12. "Use Me" – 5:01
13. "I Will Wait" – 4:15
14. "Innocence" – 3:24
15. "Space" – 2:15
16. "Only Lonely" – 4:38
17. "Goodbye Girl" (Originally recorded by David Gates) – 3:15

== Chart positions ==
Chart (2004)	Peak position
US Billboard 200	62

== Certifications ==
Certifications and sales for The Best of Hootie & the Blowfish: 1993–2003
Region	Certification	Certified units/sales
New Zealand (RMNZ)	Gold	7,500^{‡}
^{‡} Sales+streaming figures based on certification alone.
