= Live in Charleston =

Live album by Hootie & the Blowfish
- Released: August 8, 2006
- Recorded: August 12, 2005 in Daniel Island, South Carolina, United States
- Genre: Pop
- Length: 74:40
- Labels: Vanguard; 79763-2

Hootie & the Blowfish chronology
Looking for Lucky (2005)	Live in Charleston (2006)	Imperfect Circle (2019)

Live in Charleston is a live DVD/CD released by American rock band Hootie & the Blowfish on August 8, 2006. The concert features such hits as "Hold My Hand", "Only Wanna Be with You", "Old Man & Me", and "One Love" filmed in Daniel Island, South Carolina's Geely Stadium (home of the Volvo Cars Open women's tennis tournament) on August 12, 2005.

"Only Wanna Be with You" could be downloaded for free from trueAnthem.

== Track listing ==
1. Homegrown intro by Samuel L. Jackson – 0:25
2. "State Your Peace" – 3:27
3. "Time" – 4:46
4. "Space" – 2:06
5. "Hannah Jane" – 3:21
6. "Hey Sister Pretty" – 3:08
7. "Running from an Angel" – 3:55
8. "One Love" – 3:58
9. "Look Away" – 2:37
10. "Leaving" – 2:25
11. "I Hope That I Don't Fall in Love with You" – 3:03
12. "Desert Mountain Showdown" – 2:24
13. "Let Her Cry" – 5:18
14. "I Go Blind" – 2:56
15. "Old Man and Me" – 5:06
16. "Drowning" – 5:59
17. "Get Out of My Mind" – 2:37
18. "Hold My Hand" – 4:52
19. "Go and Tell Him (Soup Song)" – 4:16
20. "The Killing Stone" – 4:16
21. "Only Wanna Be with You" – 3:45
