= Group Therapy Tour =

2019 concert tour by Hootie & the Blowfish

- Tour by Hootie & the Blowfish
- Promotional poster
- Associated album: Imperfect Circle
- Start date: May 30, 2019
- End date: October 16, 2019
- Legs: 2
- No. of shows: 47 in North America; 7 in Europe; 54 Total
- Box office: $10,916,631

Hootie & the Blowfish concert chronology
- State Your Peace Tour (2008); Group Therapy Tour (2019); Summer Camp with Trucks Tour (2024)

The Group Therapy Tour was concert tour from American rock band Hootie & the Blowfish. It began on May 30, 2019, in Virginia Beach, Virginia, and ended on October 16, 2019, in Birmingham, England. This was their first full tour in over a decade, and was in support of their sixth studio album Imperfect Circle (2019).

As of July 6, 2019, the tour had proven to be the band's most successful, grossing $10.9 million.

== Background ==
In December 2018, Hootie & the Blowfish appeared on The Today Show to announce a new album and tour. In April 2019, UK and Ireland shows were added.

== Critical reception ==
Melissa Ruggieri of The Atlanta Journal-Constitution said, "If you loved their perfectly pleasant bar tunes back then, you'll appreciate that this is a well-produced nostalgic romp featuring a setlist stacked with singalongs, an effective stage show (sharp lighting, major video screen action) and a band that sounds record perfect." Billboard positively reviewed the band's performance in Nashville, praising Sonefeld's drumming, their cover of "Losing My Religion", the fusion of country and rock, and pairing with Barenaked Ladies. Mikael Wood of The Los Angeles Times gave the band's Troubador show a positive review and praised both their musicianship and how happy they made the crowd.

== Opening act ==
- Barenaked Ladies
- Jocelyn

== Setlist ==
This setlist is representative of the May 31, 2019, concert in Raleigh, NC. It does not represent all concerts for the duration of the tour.

1. "Hannah Jane"
2. "State Your Peace"
3. "I Go Blind"
4. "Fine Line"
5. "Not Even the Trees"
6. "Hold My Hand"
7. "Losing My Religion" (R.E.M. cover)
8. "I Will Wait"
9. "Let Her Cry"
10. "Hey, Hey, What Can I Do" (Led Zeppelin cover)
11. "Will the Circle Be Unbroken"
12. "Desert Mountain Showdown"
13. "I Hope That I Don't Fall In Love with You" (Tom Waits cover)
14. "Alright" (Darius Rucker Song)
15. "Running from an Angel"
16. "Drowning"
17. "Time"
18. "Wagon Wheel" (Old Crow Medicine Show cover; Darius Rucker version)
19. "Old Man and Me (When I Get to Heaven)"/"Fight the Power"/"Freaks of the Industry"/"Shining Star" (a medley including originals and covers)

Encore

20. "Goodbye"
21. "Go and Tell Him (Soup Song)"
22. "Only Wanna Be with You"/"Get Down on It"

Notes

- In Columbia, MD, Noblesville, IN, St. Paul MN, Pelham, AL, Nashville TN, and Columbia, SC they performed "With a Little Help from My Friends" with Barenaked Ladies.

== Tour dates ==
Date	City	Country	Venue
North America
May 30, 2019	Virginia Beach	United States	Veterans United Home Loans Amphitheater
May 31, 2019	Raleigh	United States	Coastal Credit Union Music Park
June 1, 2019	Atlanta	United States	Cellairis Amphitheatre
June 6, 2019	Orange Beach	United States	The Amphitheater at the Wharf
June 8, 2019	West Palm Beach	United States	Coral Sky Amphitheatre
June 9, 2019	Tampa	United States	MidFlorida Credit Union Amphitheatre
June 13, 2019	Austin	United States	Austin360 Amphitheater
June 14, 2019	The Woodlands	United States	Cynthia Woods Mitchell Pavilion
June 15, 2019	Dallas	United States	Dos Equis Pavilion
June 19, 2019	Phoenix	United States	Ak-Chin Pavilion
June 21, 2019	Chula Vista	United States	North Island Credit Union Amphitheatre
June 22, 2019	Las Vegas	United States	T-Mobile Arena
June 23, 2019	Irvine	United States	FivePoint Amphitheatre
June 25, 2019	Los Angeles	United States	Hollywood Bowl
June 28, 2019	Wheatland	United States	Toyota Amphitheatre
June 29, 2019	Mountain View	United States	Toyota Amphitheatre
July 11, 2019	Greenwood Village	United States	Fiddler's Green Amphitheatre
July 13, 2019	Maryland Heights	United States	Hollywood Casino Amphitheatre
July 14, 2019	Rogers	United States	Walmart Arkansas Music Pavilion
July 19, 2019 (Note: The show on July 19, 2019, was a part of the Great Jones County Fair.)	Monticello	United States	Great Jones County Fair
July 20, 2019	Cincinnati	United States	Riverbend Music Center
July 21, 2019	Burgettstown	United States	KeyBank Pavilion
July 26, 2019	Cuyahoga Falls	United States	Blossom Music Center
July 27, 2019	Bristow	United States	Jiffy Lube Live
July 28, 2019	Camden	United States	BB&T Pavilion
August 2, 2019	Gilford	United States	Bank of New Hampshire Pavilion
August 3, 2019	Mansfield	United States	Xfinity Center
August 4, 2019	Saratoga Springs	United States	Saratoga Performing Arts Center
August 8, 2019	Columbia	United States	Merriweather Post Pavilion
August 9, 2019	Hopewell	United States	CMAC
August 10, 2019	New York City	United States	Madison Square Garden
August 11, 2019	New York City	United States	Madison Square Garden
August 16, 2019	Clarkston	United States	DTE Energy Music Theatre
August 17, 2019	Noblesville	United States	Ruoff Home Mortgage Music Center
August 18, 2019 (Note: The show on August 18, 2019, was a part of the Iowa State Fair.)	Des Moines	United States	Iowa State Fair
August 22, 2019 (Note: The show on August 22, 2019, was a part of the Minnesota State Fair.)	Falcon Heights	United States	Minnesota State Fair
August 23, 2019	East Troy	United States	Alpine Valley Music Theatre
August 24, 2019	Tinley Park	United States	Hollywood Casino Amphitheatre
August 29, 2019	Toronto	Canada	Budweiser Stage
August 30, 2019	Hershey	United States	Hersheypark Stadium
August 31, 2019	Hartford	United States	Xfinity Theatre
September 5, 2019	Charlotte	United States	PNC Music Pavilion
September 6, 2019	Pelham	United States	Oak Mountain Amphitheatre
September 7, 2019	Nashville	United States	Bridgestone Arena
September 11, 2019	Columbia	United States	Colonial Life Arena
September 12, 2019	Columbia	United States	Colonial Life Arena
September 13, 2019	Columbia	United States	Colonial Life Arena
Europe
October 4, 2019	Dublin	Ireland	3Arena
October 6, 2019	Bristol	England	O_{2} Academy Bristol
October 7, 2019	Leeds	England	O_{2} Academy Leeds
October 9, 2019	Glasgow	Scotland	Barrowland Ballroom
October 12, 2019	London	England	Hammersmith Apollo
October 15, 2019	Manchester	England	O_{2} Ritz
October 16, 2019	Birmingham	England	O_{2} Apollo Manchester

- They additionally performed at The Troubador in Los Angeles on November 4, 2019.

List of fairs

=== Box office score data ===
Venue	City	Attendance	Gross revenue
Veterans United Home Loans Amphitheater	Virginia Beach	14,865 / 14,865	$863,872
Costal Credit Union Music Park	Raleigh	19,646 / 19,646	$1,108,944
Cellairis Amphitheatre	Atlanta	18,629 / 18,629	$1,083,790
The Amphitheater at the Wharf	Orange Beach	9,205 / 9,205	$752,244
Coral Sky Amphitheatre	West Palm Beach	15,358 / 15,358	$858,838
MidFlorida Credit Union Amphitheatre	Tampa	16,888 / 16,888	$1,057,549
Austin360 Amphitheater	Austin	11,399 / 11,399	$760,285
Cynthia Woods Mitchell Pavilion	The Woodlands	15,400 / 15,400	$907,347
Dos Equis Pavilion	Dallas	16,484 / 16,484	$1,012,478
Ak-Chin Pavilion	Phoenix	10,382 / 10,382	$576,628
North Island Credit Union Amphitheatre	Chula Vista	8,047 / 8,047	$488,914
T-Mobile Arena	Las Vegas	9,887 / 9,887	$729,225
FivePoint Amphitheatre	Irvine	9,413 / 9,413	$716,517
Total		175,603 / 175,603	$10,916,631
