= Old Man & Me (When I Get to Heaven) =

1996 single by Hootie & the Blowfish

Single by Hootie & the Blowfish

from the album Fairweather Johnson
- B-side: "Before the Heartache Rolls In"
- Released: April 2, 1996
- Length: 4:27
- Label: Atlantic
- Songwriters: Mark Bryan; Dean Felber; Darius Rucker; Jim "Soni" Sonefeld
- Producer: Don Gehman

Hootie & the Blowfish singles chronology
"Drowning" (1995)	"Old Man & Me (When I Get to Heaven)" (1996)	"Tucker's Town" (1996)

"Old Man & Me (When I Get to Heaven)" is a song by American rock group Hootie & the Blowfish. It was released in April 1996 by Atlantic Records as the lead single from their second album, Fairweather Johnson (1996). In the United States, it peaked at numbers four and 13 on the US Cash Box Top 100 and Billboard Hot 100 charts, number six on the Billboard Mainstream Rock Tracks chart, and number one on the Billboard Triple-A chart. The song also reached number one in Canada, becoming the band's third and final single to do so.

== Background ==
The song first appeared in an earlier version on the band's 1993 self-released EP, Kootchypop. The EP's liner notes explain the origin of the song:

I was walking on Santee Street in Columbia leaving Monterrey Jack's and an older man came up to me. He asked for some change and me being in a bad mood (not me) I gave him some smart ass "BUM" remark. I went for a block on my way to the Elbow Room and I felt like the biggest pompous asshole. So I woke up the next morning and wrote this fictitious conversation about his life because you never know what has happened to these unfortunate people.

== Music video ==
The music video was directed by Dan Winters and filmed in Columbia, South Carolina. The scenes of the mill ruins were filmed in Rockingham, North Carolina, at the Great Falls Mill Ruins and the waterfall behind the ruins.

== Track listings ==
- US 7-inch vinyl and cassette single

A. "Old Man & Me (When I Get to Heaven)" (album version) – 4:26
B. "Before the Heartache Rolls In" – 4:26

- US CD single
1. "Old Man & Me (When I Get to Heaven)" (album version) – 4:26
2. "Before the Heartache Rolls In" – 4:26
3. "Old Man & Me (When I Get to Heaven)" (video)
- UK CD single
1. "Old Man & Me (When I Get to Heaven)" (LP version) – 4:26
2. "Before the Heartache Rolls In" – 4:23
3. "Only Wanna Be with You" (live) – 6:07
4. "Time" – 5:27
- European and Australian CD single
1. "Old Man & Me (When I Get to Heaven)" (LP version) – 4:26
2. "Old Man & Me (When I Get to Heaven)" (radio edit) – 3:59
3. "Before the Heartache Rolls In" (LP version) – 4:26

== Charts ==
=== Weekly charts ===
Weekly chart performance for "Old Man & Me (When I Get to Heaven)"
Chart (1996)	Peak position
Australia (ARIA)	60
Canada Top Singles (RPM)	1
Canada Adult Contemporary (RPM)	2
European Hit Radio Top 40 (Music & Media)	12
Germany (GfK)	75
Iceland (Íslenski Listinn Topp 40)	8
Italy (Music & Media)	18
New Zealand (Recorded Music NZ)	41
Scottish Singles Sales (Official Charts)	53
Spain Airplay (Music & Media)	7
UK Singles (Official Charts)	57
US Billboard Hot 100	13
US Adult Alternative Airplay (Billboard)	1
US Adult Contemporary (Billboard)	18
US Adult Pop Airplay (Billboard)	4
US Alternative Airplay (Billboard)	33
US Mainstream Rock Airplay (Billboard)	6
US Pop Airplay (Billboard)	5
US Cash Box Top 100	4

=== Year-end charts ===
Year-end chart performance for "Old Man & Me (When I Get to Heaven)"
Chart (1996)	Position
Canada Top Singles (RPM)	13
Canada Adult Contemporary (RPM)	21
Iceland (Íslenski Listinn Topp 40)	90
US Billboard Hot 100	74
US Adult Top 40 (Billboard)	27
US Mainstream Rock Tracks (Billboard)	54
US Top 40/Mainstream (Billboard)	37
US Triple-A (Billboard)	11

=== Decade-end charts ===
Decade-end chart performance for "Old Man & Me (When I Get to Heaven)"
Chart (1990–1999)	Position
Canada (Nielsen SoundScan)	21

== Release history ==
Release dates and formats for "Old Man & Me (When I Get to Heaven)"
Region	Date	Format(s)	Label(s)	Ref.
United States	April 2, 1996	Top 40; album rock; modern rock; triple-A radio	Atlantic	
United Kingdom	April 22, 1996	CD; cassette	Atlantic	
