= Kootchypop =

EP by Hootie & the Blowfish
- Released: 1993
- Recorded: 1993
- Studio: Reflection Studios, Charlotte, N.C.
- Genre: Roots rock; heartland rock
- Length: 24:36
- Label: Fishco
- Producer: Hootie & the Blowfish; Mark Williams

Hootie & the Blowfish chronology
Time (1991)	Kootchypop (1993)	Cracked Rear View (1994)

Kootchypop is a 1993 EP by Hootie & the Blowfish released independently. Several of the EP's songs became hits when they were re-recorded for their later major-label albums. In addition, the tracks were eventually remastered and included as a bonus on the deluxe 25th anniversary edition of Cracked Rear View.

== Recording and release ==
The band self-funded the EP for $8,000 (equivalent to $11,963 in 2025) and it caught the attention of Tim Sommer, A&R at Atlantic Records, who encouraged the label to sign the band. By 1996, they had sold over 50,000 copies of the album. In covering the band's career, Ira Robbins and Jason C. Reeher of Trouser Press called the EP "a thoroughly professional effort which is 95 percent of the way toward the sound that made the band millionaires".

In 1998, the band's self-released recordings were the center of a lawsuit between Fishco, Inc.—the corporate entity they formed to represent the band—and California-based Haim Mizrahi, who attempted to sell the master recordings.

== Track listing ==
All songs written by Hootie & the Blowfish.

1. "The Old Man and Me" – 4:26 (Re-recorded for Fairweather Johnson)
2. "Hold My Hand" – 5:05 (Re-recorded for Cracked Rear View)
3. "If You're Going My Way" – 3:26
4. "Sorry's Not Enough" – 4:03
5. "Only Wanna Be with You" – 3:37 (Re-recorded for Cracked Rear View)
6. "Hold My Hand" (edit) – 3:59

== Personnel ==
Hootie & the Blowfish

- Mark Bryan – guitar, vocals, production
- Dean Felber – bass guitar, vocals, production
- Darius Rucker – vocals, guitar, production
- Jim Sonefeld – drums, vocals, production

Additional personnel

- Jim Brock – congas on "Sorry's Not Enough"
- Don Dixon – harmony arrangements on "If You're Going My Way"
- Mana Hewitt – art, layout
- Suzy McGrane – photography
- Mark Williams – production, engineering, mixing, recording, mastering
