= I Only Wanna Be with You =

I Only Wanna Be with You may refer to:

- "I Only Want to Be with You", a 1963 song by Dusty Springfield
- "Only Wanna Be with You", a 1995 song by Hootie & the Blowfish
- I Only Wanna Be with You, a 1994 album by Bridgette Wilson
