= Bonehead =

Bonehead may refer to:

== Arts and entertainment ==
- Bonehead (band), a Philadelphia, Pennsylvania band
- Bone Head, a 1997 album by the band Half Japanese
- Bonehead, a BBC TV series starring Colin Douglas
- Bonehead, a character in various comic films, such as The Bullshitters: Roll out the Gunbarrel
- “Boneheads", a short on Random! Cartoons

== People ==
- Bonehead Merkle (1888–1956), American baseball player
- Paul Arthurs, nicknamed Bonehead, rhythm guitarist of the band Oasis

== Other uses ==
- Pachycephalosaurus, a genus of dinosaur
- White power skinhead, used by punk rockers and Skinheads Against Racial Prejudice (SHARP)
