= Scattered, Smothered and Covered =

Compilation album by Hootie & the Blowfish
- Released: October 24, 2000
- Studios: NRG Studios, North Hollywood, California; Reflection Sound Studios, Charlotte, North Carolina; The Site, San Rafael, California; Royaltone Studios, North Hollywood, California
- Genre: Rock
- Length: 56:00
- Label: Atlantic
- Producer: Don Gehman

Hootie & the Blowfish chronology
Musical Chairs (1998)	Scattered, Smothered and Covered (2000)	Hootie & the Blowfish (2003)

Professional ratings
Review scores
Source	Rating
AllMusic	3/5 stars
Billboard	(average)
Rolling Stone	3/5 stars

Scattered, Smothered and Covered is a covers album by American rock band Hootie & the Blowfish, released in 2000.

== Track listing ==
Standard track listing
No.	Title	Writer(s)	Length
1.	"Fine Line" (Originally recorded by Radney Foster)	Radney Foster	3:32
2.	"I Go Blind" (Originally recorded by 54-40)	Neil Osborne	3:14
3.	"Almost Home" (Originally recorded by the Reivers)	John Croslin	3:51
4.	"Hey Hey What Can I Do" (Originally recorded by Led Zeppelin)	John Bonham, John Paul Jones, Jimmy Page, Robert Plant	3:52
5.	"Renaissance Eyes" (Originally recorded by Don Dixon)	Don Dixon	5:04
6.	"Before the Heartache Rolls In" (Originally recorded by Foster & Lloyd)	Radney Foster, Bill Lloyd	3:52
7.	"Araby" (Originally recorded by the Reivers)	John Croslin	2:49
8.	"I'm Over You" (Originally recorded by The Silos)	Bob Rupe	4:18
9.	"Gravity of the Situation" (Originally recorded by Vic Chesnutt)	Rob Veal	4:36
10.	"I Hope That I Don't Fall in Love with You" (Originally recorded by Tom Waits)	Tom Waits	2:58
11.	"Dream Baby" (Originally recorded by Roy Orbison)	Cindy Walker	3:00
12.	"Driver 8" (Originally recorded by R.E.M.)	Bill Berry, Peter Buck, Mike Mills, Michael Stipe	4:27
13.	"Let Me Be Your Man" (Originally recorded by Gregory Ritchey)	Gregory Ritchey	3:04
14.	"Please, Please, Please Let Me Get What I Want" (Originally recorded by the Smiths)	Johnny Marr, Morrissey	1:50
15.	"Use Me" (Originally recorded by Bill Withers)	Bill Withers	5:01

Japanese bonus track
No.	Title	Writer(s)	Length
16.	"Freedom's Child" (Originally recorded by Hootie and the Blowfish for the album adaptation of The Civil War)	Frank Wildhorn, Jack Murphy	3:18

== Personnel ==
Credits adapted from album's liner notes.

Hootie and the Blowfish

- Mark Bryan – guitars, vocals, mandolin (track 9), Wurlitzer (11), electric mandolin (14)
- Dean Felber – bass, vocals, acoustic guitar (track 14)
- Darius Rucker – vocals, guitars, fade out guitar solo (track 8)
- Jim Sonefeld – drums, percussion, vocals, acoustic guitar (track 14)

Additional musicians

- Susan Cowsill – harmony vocals (track 12)
- Ron De La Vega – bass (track 9)
- Gary Greene – percussion (track 15)
- Nanci Griffith – vocals (track 9)
- Peter Holsapple – mandolin (track 4)
- James Hooker – Hammond B3 (track 9)
- Jamie Hoover – organ (track 13), 12-string guitar (14)
- Doug Lancio – guitar (track 9)
- Edwin McCain – vocals (track 15)
- Pat McInerney – percussion (track 9)
- Jon Nau – keyboards
- Gena Rankin – harmony vocals (tracks 1, 3)
- Craig Shields – baritone saxophone (track 15)
- Tim Sommer – organ (track 2)
- The Walker Sisters – backing vocals (track 11)

Production

- Mark Dearnley – remixing and mastering
- Don Dixon – producer, engineer, and mixer (track 15)
- Don Gehman – producer, engineer, and mixer (tracks 1–12), remixing and mastering
- Jim Goodwin – mixing assistant (track 4)
- John Harris – engineer (track 9)
- Billy Huelin – live sound engineer
- Curt Kroeger – assistant engineer (track 12)
- Dave Leonard – mixing (track 12)
- Wade Norton – engineer (track 1), assistant engineer (2, 3)
- David Puryear – assistant engineer (track 15)
- Tracy Schroeder – engineer (track 11), assistant engineer (13–15), mixing assistant (13, 14)
- Roger Sommers – assistant engineer (track 12)
- Liz Sroka – assistant engineer (tracks 1–3)
- Doug Trantow – engineer and mixing (track 12)
- Mark Williams – producer (track 15), engineer, and mixer (13–15), assistant engineer (4)

== Chart positions ==
Chart (2000)	Peak position
US Billboard 200	71
