= Cracked Rear View =

Studio album by Hootie & the Blowfish
- Released: July 5, 1994
- Recorded: November 1993 − March 1994
- Studios: NRG, North Hollywood, California, US
- Genres: Alternative rock; heartland rock; roots rock
- Length: 46:36
- Label: Atlantic
- Producer: Don Gehman

Hootie & the Blowfish chronology
Kootchypop (1993)	Cracked Rear View (1994)	Fairweather Johnson (1996)

Singles from Cracked Rear View
- 1. "Hold My Hand" Released: July 18, 1994; 2. "Let Her Cry" Released: December 17, 1994; 3. "Only Wanna Be with You" Released: July 17, 1995; 4. "Time" Released: October 24, 1995; 5. "Drowning" Released: November 1995

Cracked Rear View is the debut studio album by Hootie & the Blowfish, released on July 5, 1994, by Atlantic Records. Released to positive critical reviews, it eventually became one of the highest-selling albums in the United States, and also one of the best-selling albums worldwide, with over 20 million units.

== Recording, release, and promotion ==
Hootie and the Blowfish were established in 1986 and while they had recorded some self-released promos, such as 1993's Kootchypop EP, this was their first full-length release. Some of the songs on Cracked Rear View had been previously recorded on these demos and had been honed by the band in live performances for several years. Don Gehman was chosen by A&R man Tim Sommer as a producer because of his previous work with John Mellencamp and R.E.M. Gehman's career had been in commercial decline for several years after having had successes in the 1980s, so he pivoted to accepting lower-profile artists, smaller budgets, and being more efficient in the studio to cut costs. It cost US$200,000 to make and the label invested a relatively moderate $75,000 to Gehman for producing (equivalent to $434,441 in 2025 and $162,915, respectively). The recording and mixing process took 28 days, made up of 20 days of recording and 8 mixing; he kept costs down by mixing the album himself and providing his own equipment for the band to use. In 1996, Gehman reflected on the expectations of the release, stating that no one at Atlantic Records expected it to be a blockbuster, but possibly selling a few hundred thousand copies to establish the band an audience building on their existing South Carolina fan base; as sales took off, the label became more invested and the promotion caused sales to continue to grow. Gehman later produced and mixed Fairweather Johnson (1996), Musical Chairs (1998), and Looking for Lucky (2005) by the band.

The album was promoted by a string of music videos, singles, and promotional tour appearances. Hootie & the Blowfish had been performing approximately 300 shows a year at this point and continued touring throughout the mid-1990s to support Cracked Rear View, including high-profile television appearances, including three episodes of Late Show with David Letterman, and benefit concerts such as FarmAid. Atlantic successfully piloted a promotional strategy using low-power radio stations that targeted specific regional markets to promote Cracked Rear View and they expanded this project based on the strong sales of this album. Regular airplay on VH-1 also helped to grow the audience for this album.

== Reception ==
=== Commercial reception ===
Cracked Rear View is Hootie & the Blowfish's most successful album. While initial sales were modest and it debuted at 127 on the Billboard 200, it topped that chart five times in 1995 and was the best-selling album of 1995 in the United States, selling 7 million copies, besting the second-place Crazysexycool by 2.2 million. This won the 1995 Billboard Music Award for Top Billboard 200 Album. Sales were strong enough that Hootie & the Blowfish were the best-selling group of 1996 in adult contemporary and pop music as well, between this album and follow-up Fairweather Johnson and in April of that year, Time reported that Cracked Rear View had generated over US$100 million in gross revenues for Atlantic Records (equivalent to $205,283,259 in 2025). Both of the band's first two efforts were in the top 20 albums of 1996; Cracked Rear View was 20th, selling 1.9 million copies. In 1995 to 1996, Cracked Rear View sold more than 100,000 copies per week for 40 weeks. This was during an industry-wide trend of depressed sales in both the United States and Canada.

The album moved 10 million certified sales by October 1995, reaching 12 million by February 1996, which made it the fifth-best selling debut album and this increased by another million sales by June, reaching fourth place. A 1999 assessment that it had sold 16 million copies made it the most copies of a debut album sold. It had sold 10.2 million copies in the United States per Nielsen SoundScan by 2012, with an additional 3 million copies sold through CD clubs, which are not included in SoundScan's total. It is the joint 19th-best-selling album of all time in the United States, rising to 10th place if one excludes compilations. Internationally, Cracked Rear View reached number one in Canada, where it was also the best-selling album of the year at over 800,000 units and also topped charts in New Zealand. In 1999, it was one of the 62 inaugural diamond certifications by the Recording Industry Association of America, placing at 16 with 15 million sales and was certified 22× platinum (double diamond) by 2018. Alongside Led Zeppelin's fourth album, it is the best-selling release on Atlantic and is the album with the fourth-most weeks topping the Billboard 200 from the label.

The massive commercial success of the band led to some backlash, specifically centered on their music being bland or middle of the road soft rock and being out of step with trends like gangsta rap or grunge, as well as the band's comical name. For instance, in late 1995, Chris Norris of New York wrote that the year in rock music was summed up by Hootie & the Blowfish, which he critiqued for being "aggressively normal" and making "willfully centrist rock". Reassessments in the 2010s have been more kind to the band, noting their importance to 1990s rock music and as younger fans from the 1990s have grown up with nostalgia for the group. In particular, the 25th anniversary of this album led outlets such as Consequence of Sound to note that there was an audience for mid-tempo rock music with solid songwriting that did not reflect the wake of Nirvana's huge success with Nevermind in 1991 and by artists that had no interest in trying to be cool. In The Dallas Observer, Preston Jones noted that the critical backlash had long ago subsided and that the band's "material has aged extraordinarily well, fond remembrances aside" including live performances touring for their 2019 release Imperfect Circle.

=== Critical reception ===
Professional ratings
Review scores
Source	Rating
AllMusic	4.5/5 stars
Christgau's Consumer Guide	B
Consequence	B
Encyclopedia of Popular Music	4/5 stars
Kerrang!	4/5 stars
MusicHound Rock	4.5/5 stars
Rolling Stone	3.5/5 stars
The Rolling Stone Album Guide	3/5 stars

Critical reviews of Cracked Rear View were mostly positive. Editors at AllMusic rated this album 4.5 out of 5 stars, with critic Stephen Thomas Erlewine writing that the album as "the success story of 1994/1995" and continued, "although Hootie & the Blowfish aren't innovative, they deliver the goods, turning out an album of solid, rootsy folk-rock songs that have simple, powerful hooks". A review for retailers by Billboard compared the music to Counting Crows and John Mellencamp and spotlighted "Hold My Hand" as particularly accessible. Robert Christgau rated the album a B and praised Darius Rucker's "gruff grit [which] adds an extra layer of substance" to the simple songwriting and musicianship and noted the importance of mainstream white audiences hearing about black issues from a black singer.

The band won for Grammy Award for Best New Artist and "Let Her Cry" won Grammy Award for Best Pop Performance by a Duo or Group with Vocals at the 38th Annual Grammy Awards.

== Track listing ==
All songs written by Mark Bryan, Dean Felber, Darius Rucker and Jim "Soni" Sonefeld, except where noted.

1. "Hannah Jane" – 3:33
2. "Hold My Hand" – 4:15
3. "Let Her Cry" – 5:08
4. "Only Wanna Be with You" – 3:46
5. "Running from an Angel" – 3:37
6. "I'm Goin' Home" – 4:10
7. "Drowning" – 5:01
8. "Time" – 4:53
9. "Look Away" – 2:38
10. "Not Even the Trees" – 4:37
11. "Goodbye" – 4:05

Includes hidden track "Sometimes I Feel Like a Motherless Child" (traditional) – 0:53

In 2001, the album was re-released on DVD-Audio with the disc featuring a discography, photo gallery, and video of a live performance of "Drowning".

The 25th anniversary edition from 2019 includes the following bonus discs:

Disc 2: B-sides, Outtakes, Pre-LP Independent Recordings

1. "All That I Believe" – 3:29
2. "I Go Blind" (Neil Osborne, Phil Comparelli, Brad Merritt, Darryl Neudorf) – 3:13
3. "Almost Home" – 4:02
4. "Fine Line" – 3:33
5. "Where Were You" – 3:55
6. "Hey, Hey What Can I Do" (John Bonham, John Paul Jones, Jimmy Page, Robert Plant) – 3:56
7. "The Old Man and Me" – Kootchypop Version – 4:29
8. "Hold My Hand" – Kootchypop Version – 5:07
9. "If You're Going My Way" – Kootchypop Version – 3:29
10. "Sorry's Not Enough" – Kootchypop Version – 4:04
11. "Only Wanna Be with You" – Kootchypop Version – 3:41
12. "Running from an Angel" – 1991 Version – 3:57
13. "Time" – 1991 Version – 4:28
14. "Let Her Cry" – 1991 Version – 5:02
15. "Drowning" – 1991 Version – 5:50
16. "I Don't Understand" – 5:50
17. "Little Girl" – 2:50
18. "Look Away" – 1990 Version – 2:58
19. "Let My People Go" – 2:37
20. "Hold My Hand" – 1990 Version – 4:40

Disc 3: Live at Nick's Fat City, Pittsburgh, PA, February 3, 1995

1. "Hannah Jane" – 3:36
2. "I Go Blind" – 3:04
3. "Not Even the Trees" – 4:40
4. "If You're Going My Way" – 3:31
5. "Look Away" – 2:36
6. "Fine Line" – 3:23
7. "Let Her Cry" – 5:15
8. "Motherless Child" – 0:54
9. "I'm Goin' Home" – 4:37
10. "Use Me" – 5:00
11. "Running from an Angel" – 4:06
12. "Sorry's Not Enough" – 4:17
13. "Drowning" – 6:12
14. "The Old Man and Me" – 4:20
15. "Only Wanna Be with You" – 3:53
16. "Time" – 5:12
17. "Goodbye" – 3:54
18. "The Ballad of John and Yoko" (Lennon-McCartney) – 2:55
19. "Hold My Hand" – 5:31
20. "Love the One You're With" (Stephen Stills) – 2:50

DVD

- 5.1 Surround Sound mix of the original album

Hi-Res 24/96 Bonus Tracks

- "All That I Believe"
- "I Go Blind"
- "Almost Home"
- "Fine Line"
- "Where Were You"

Music videos:

- "Hold My Hand"
- "Let Her Cry"
- "Only Wanna Be with You"
- "Time"
- "Drowning" – Live

== Personnel ==
Hootie & the Blowfish

- Mark Bryan – electric guitar, acoustic guitar, vocal percussion, mandolin on "Only Wanna Be with You", piano on "Not Even the Trees"
- Dean Felber – bass guitar, clavinet, vocals, piano on "Only Wanna Be with You"
- Darius Rucker – vocals, acoustic guitar, percussion
- Jim "Soni" Sonefeld – drums, percussion, vocals, piano on "Look Away" and "Goodbye", glasses on "Not Even the Trees"

Additional musicians

- David Crosby – background vocals on "Hold My Hand"
- Lili Haydn – violin on "Look Away" and "Running from an Angel"
- John Nau – piano on "I'm Goin' Home", Hammond organ

Production

- Jean Cronin – art direction
- Don Gehman – production, engineering, mixing
- Michael McLaughlin – photography
- Wade Norton – assistant engineering
- Gena Rankin – production coordination
- Eddy Schreyer – mastering
- Tim Sommer – artists and repertoire
- Liz Sroka – assistant mixing

== Charts ==
=== Weekly charts ===
Weekly chart performance for Cracked Rear View
Chart (1994–1995)	Peak position
Australian Albums (ARIA)	7
Canadian Albums (RPM)	1
German Albums (Offizielle Top 100)	45
New Zealand Albums (RMNZ)	1
Scottish Albums (Official Charts)	16
UK Albums (Official Charts)	12
US Billboard 200	1

=== Year-end charts ===
1995 annual chart performance for Cracked Rear View
Chart (1995)	Position
Australian Albums (ARIA)	23
Canada Top Albums/CDs (RPM)	1
New Zealand Albums (RMNZ)	2
US Billboard 200	1

1996 annual chart performance for Cracked Rear View
Chart (1996)	Position
Canadian Albums (RPM)	19
New Zealand Albums (RMNZ)	19
US Billboard 200	9

=== Decade-end charts ===
Decade-end chart performance for Cracked Rear View
Chart (1990–1999)	Position
US Billboard 200	7

== Certifications and sales ==
Certifications and sales for Cracked Rear View
Region	Certification	Certified units/sales
Australia (ARIA)	2× Platinum	140,000^{^}
Canada (Music Canada)	Diamond	1,000,000^{^}
Denmark (IFPI Danmark)	Gold	10,000^{‡}
New Zealand (RMNZ)	Platinum	15,000^{^}
United Kingdom (BPI)	Gold	100,000^{^}
United States (RIAA)	22× Platinum	22,000,000^{‡}
Worldwide	—	20,000,000
^{^} Shipments figures based on certification alone.^{‡} Sales+streaming figures based on certification alone.

== See also ==
- List of 1994 albums
