= Bonehead (band) =

American alternative rock band

- Also known as: Familiar 48
- Origin: Philadelphia, Pennsylvania, U.S.
- Genres: Alternative rock Post-grunge
- Years active: 1994–2003; 2005–present
- Labels: Vulgar Entertainment; MCA Records

Bonehead (also known as Familiar 48) is an American alternative rock band, best known for their US radio hit, "The Question".

== History ==
Bonehead was formed in 1994 by Stone Groove Productions as a Philadelphia area nightclub cover band. A trademark of the band was during sets a group of die hard Bonehead fans would do different pro wrestling gestures usually getting a response from Scott. By 1997, the band released an EP of original music, entitled "Bonehead". This EP was mainly available for purchase at the band's live performances & sold well enough to justify a follow-up effort. Their next release was a CD single for the song "I Know" in 1998 on Vulgar Entertainment; their first LP was 1999's Fade, also released on Vulgar. After discovering that the name "Bonehead" was very similar to another band with national aspirations, the band changed names in 2000 to Familiar 48. Producer Don Gehman, expressing interest in the band's debut album, got them signed to Refuge Records, a subsidiary of MCA Records and produced their major-label debut, Wonderful Nothing. The album was released in April 2002, with the lead single "Learn to Love Again"; this song failed to chart, but a later single, "The Question", experienced minor chart success in the United States. Mannon broke the band up in 2003, and began recording songs in hopes of putting together a solo project, but this never materialized.

In 2005, Mannon announced a reformulation of the band under the old name, and the next year yielded a re-press of Fade with four extra bonus tracks. In 2007, Jayy Mannon announced that Bonehead would release a new album containing much of the work he wrote as a solo artist, entitled Broken and Glued. Since then Bonehead has remained primarily a regional draw, playing in the Philadelphia area mostly as a cover band. In 2011 Bonehead released its first new music in four years, a digital single entitled "Real".

== Members ==
Current Members

- Jayy Mannon - guitar, lead & backing vocals, drums
- Jeff Camarco - bass
- Daryl Updike - drums
- Kevin Hug - guitars, bass

Former Members

- Rick Dean Smith - guitars, vocals
- Dave Poole - guitars, vocals
- Walt Sarkees - guitars, vocals
- Jeffery Beck - keyboards, vocals
- Chris Martin - guitars, vocals
- Derek Lim - guitars, vocals
- Pat Callahan - guitars
- Mike Arellano - guitars, vocals
- Nick Denofa - drums
- Mike McPeak - drums
- Scott Pustilnick (aka Scott Stanley) - bass

== Discography ==
- Bonehead EP (1997)
- I Know CD-Single (Vulgar, 1998)
- Fade (Vulgar, 1999)
  - reissued in 2006 by Vulgar
- Wonderful Nothing (as Familiar 48) (MCA, 2002)
- Broken and Glued (Vulgar, 2007)

=== Charting singles ===
Year	Title	Chart Positions		Album
Year	Title	US Adult Top 40	US Mainstream Rock	Album
2002	"The Question"	No. 40	No. 30	Wonderful Nothing
