= Adolfo Doring =

American filmmaker

- Born: Mexico City, Mexico
- Occupation: Independent documentary film director

Adolfo Doring is an American documentary filmmaker and director of music videos.

== Video career ==
Doring came to New York City in the mid-eighties to study sociology at Columbia University, then interned for rock and roll photographer Joel Brodsky. Doring began his film career in middle school when he started using Super 8 film to make small documentaries as a way to avoid term papers. The combination of his photographic skills and well-developed understanding of cinematic language led him to an early career in cinematography. Doring was director of photography for music videos of Pearl Jam, Alice in Chains, Republic of Loose, Screaming Trees, and Stone Temple Pilots, while also flying back east to work in the hip hop world (Public Enemy, LL Cool J, Nas, Redman).

Doring's first directing job for Atlantic Records was for heavy metal group Testament. It led to directing music videos for artists including Sting, Savage Garden, Bon Jovi, Vanessa Mae, Hootie and the Blowfish, Gin Blossoms, The Dixie Chicks, Diana Krall and Del Amitri among others. In 1994 Doring won an MTV Video Music Award for the Hootie and the Blowfish single, "Hold My Hand", and directed the video for the band's next single, "Let Her Cry", which was that year's most played video. He was nominated by the MVPA for Best Country Video for The Dixie Chicks' "You Were Mine".

== Film ==
Doring's work in documentary films began with the documentary Karaoke Man (2003), followed by The Trial of the St. Patrick's Four (2006) and Got Stem Cells? (2007), and Blind Spot (2008).

Doring's narrative feature film work began with Metro (2005) which was premiered at the 2006 Tribeca Film Festival. Thinly Veiled, his second narrative feature, has been reviewed with adjectives such as "transformative," "disturbing," "compelling," "twisted," and "fantastic."

=== Blind Spot ===
Doring wrote and directed the documentary film Blind Spot, about the current oil and energy crisis. It explores the subject of peak oil and its implications for the future of civilization. It includes interviews with sociologist William R Catton, evolutionary biologist Jason Bradford, environmental analyst Lester Brown, NASA's James E. Hansen, author Bill McKibben, physicist Albert Allen Bartlett, and others.

The film was shown in 2008 at the Woodstock Film Festival, London Independent Film Festival, and European Film Festival Moscow.
