= Musical Chairs (Hootie & the Blowfish album) =

Studio album by Hootie & the Blowfish
- Released: September 15, 1998
- Recorded: 1998
- Studio: Royaltone Studios, North Hollywood, California
- Genre: Roots rock; heartland rock; jangle pop; alternative rock
- Length: 49:30
- Label: Atlantic
- Producer: Don Gehman

Hootie & the Blowfish chronology
Fairweather Johnson (1996)	Musical Chairs (1998)	Scattered, Smothered and Covered (2000)

Professional ratings
Review scores
Source	Rating
AllMusic	4/5 stars
Chicago Tribune	(favorable)
Entertainment Weekly	B
Rolling Stone	3/5 stars
USA Today	2.5/4 stars

Musical Chairs is the third studio album by American rock band Hootie & the Blowfish, released on September 15, 1998, by Atlantic Records. Three singles were released off the album: "I Will Wait", "Only Lonely", and "Wishing". Guest musicians on the album include Peter Holsapple, Susan Cowsill, David Immergluck, and Boyd Tinsley.

== Track listing ==
All songs written by Mark Bryan, Dean Felber, Darius Rucker and Jim Sonefeld.

1. "I Will Wait" – 4:15
2. "Wishing" – 2:48
3. "Las Vegas Nights" – 4:05
4. "Only Lonely" – 4:38
5. "Answer Man" – 3:22
6. "Michelle Post" – 2:20
7. "Bluesy Revolution" – 4:46
8. "Home Again" – 4:07
9. "One By One" – 3:50
10. "Desert Mountain Showdown" – 2:45
11. "What's Going On Here" – 4:36
12. "What Do You Want from Me Now" – 3:40

Hidden tracks

13. silence – 0:30
14. silence – 0:30
15. "Closet Full of Fear" – 3:18

== Personnel ==
Hootie & the Blowfish

- Mark Bryan – guitars, background vocals, banjo (track 6)
- Dean Felber – bass guitar, background vocals, acoustic guitar (track 6)
- Darius Rucker – vocals, guitars, mandolin (track 10)
- Jim Sonefeld – drums, percussion, background vocals, bass guitar (track 6)

Additional musicians

- John Nau – Hammond organ, piano, harmonica (track 11), Vox Jaguar (track 2), Wurlitzer (track 9)
- Robert Becker – viola (track 4)
- David Campbell – string arrangement (track 4)
- Larry Corbett – cello (track 4)
- Susan Cowsill – vocals (tracks 4, 12)
- Joel Derouin – violin (track 4)
- Bruce Dukov – violin (track 4)
- Armen Gahabedian – violin (track 4)
- Gary Greene – percussion (tracks 1, 3, 4, 11, 12)
- Peter Holsapple – accordion (track 2), Dobro (track 10), electric guitar (track 9), mandolin (track 9), piano (track 8)
- David Immerglück – electric slide guitar (tracks 1, 9), pedal steel (track 2)
- Suzie Katayama – cello (track 4)
- LeRoi Moore – soprano and alto sax (track 11)
- Rachel Purkin – violin (track 4)
- Gena Rankin – vocals (track 12)
- Boyd Tinsley – violin (tracks 1, 10)
- Patrick Warren – Chamberlin (track 4)

Production

- Don Gehman – producer, engineer, co-mixing
- Doug Trantow – engineer, co-mixing
- Curt Kroeger – assistant engineer
- Roger Sommers – assistant engineer
- David Leonard – mixing
- Joe Gastwirt – mastering

== Chart positions ==
Chart (1998)	Peak position
Canadian Albums chart	27
German Albums	72
New Zealand Albums	20
Scottish Albums	14
UK Albums chart	15
US Billboard 200	4

== Certifications ==
Region	Certification	Certified units/sales
United Kingdom (BPI)	Silver	60,000^{^}
United States (RIAA)	Platinum	1,000,000^{^}
^{^} Shipments figures based on certification alone.
