= Imperfect Circle =

Studio album by Hootie & the Blowfish
- Released: November 1, 2019
- Recorded: 2018
- Genre: Country rock
- Length: 42:31
- Label: Capitol Nashville
- Producer: Frank Rogers; Jeff Trott

Hootie & the Blowfish chronology
Live in Charleston (2006)	Imperfect Circle (2019)

Singles from Imperfect Circle
- 1. "Rollin'" Released: September 6, 2019; 2. "Miss California" Released: September 20, 2019; 3. "Lonely on a Saturday Night" Released: October 4, 2019; 4. "Hold On" Released: October 17, 2019; 5. "Turn It Up" Released: October 25, 2019

Imperfect Circle is the sixth studio album by American rock band Hootie & the Blowfish, released on Capitol Records Nashville on November 1, 2019. It is their first new studio album in fourteen years; it has received mixed reviews and modest commercial success.

== Recording and release ==
The album was announced in December 2018, along with their Group Therapy Tour, the first outing the band had made since 2008. Once the group decided to re-form, they went to vocalist Darius Rucker's management company to help them arrange for recording and promotion. The band members decided to record again concurrent with the decision to tour and used the opportunity to debut new tracks live. This release is the first from the band in 14 years and the title was announced on August 9, 2019.

To promote the album, the single "Rollin'" was made available with pre-orders on their site and to the general public on September 6. The band enlisted Frank Rogers and Jeff Trott to record them, along with a variety of guest musicians. Individual band members brought in songs that they had considered for solo efforts (guitarist Mark Bryan, with "Turn It Up") or that resulted from jam sessions (singer Darius Rucker with pop musician Ed Sheeran on "Wildfire Love"), finally arriving at 17 tracks recorded in the studio. The band worked with outside songwriters for this recording, admonishing them, "We don't want you to write the Hootie song... Write a song and we'll make it sound like Hootie." The goal for songwriting was authenticity and an ability to speak to the average person.

The band released the track listing and lead single "Rollin'" on September 5. "Miss California" and "Lonely on a Saturday Night" followed, with "Hold On" coming out on October 18. Some sources indicated that the song "Unafraid" would be on the final release but it was cut.

While touring to support the album in 2019, Hootie & the Blowfish made a recording of R.E.M's "Losing My Religion" and added it to digital copies of Imperfect Circle in 2020.

== Reception ==
The band's hometown paper, The Post and Courier ran a negative review written by Associated Press writer Mark Kennedy, who acknowledged some solid musicality but ultimately concluded that the album is made up of "utterly forgettable songs" and "nothing on this album is fresh". A second review in the same paper from their local writer Kalyn Oyer was more positive: she wrote, "Imperfect Circle doesn’t have an 'I Only Wanna Be With You' on it, but some Hootie fans won’t care about that. There are still plenty of catchy, if cheesy, songs."

In Consequence of Sound, Tyler Clark awarded the album a C−, calling it "painfully bland" but praises Rucker's vocals and lyrics. The editorial staff of AllMusic Guide gave the release four out of five stars, with reviewer Stephen Thomas Erlewine called this "a nice blend between the group's signature college rock singalongs and Rucker's slick, cheerful solo work" and praised the album's positive feel, writing, "This friendliness lends itself to a collection of songs that are resolutely sturdy, designed to sound more charming over time, and the inherent warmth of Imperfect Circle is reason enough to give the tunes a chance to grow." The Texarkana Gazette published a mixed interview that called the songs "earnest and yet utterly forgettable" which are "nice when you play them but make no discernible impression". Ken Tucker of Fresh Air opines "This collection manages the tricky challenge of sounding like classic Hootie while also extending the group's sound for the 21st century", calling it "a well-made, frequently thoughtful album".

== Commercial performance ==
Imperfect Circle debuted at No. 3 on Billboard's Top Country Albums and No. 26 on Billboard 200 based on 17,000 units, 15,000 of which are pure album sales. It is their first appearance on the Country chart, and their highest entry on Billboard 200 since 1998. It has sold 42,700 copies in the United States as of March 2020.

== Track listing ==
1. "New Year's Day" (Tofer Brown, Hootie & the Blowfish, Eric Paslay, Jeff Trott) – 3:32
2. "Miss California" (Andrew DeRoberts, David Ryan Harris, Hootie & the Blowfish) – 3:12
3. "Wild Fire Love" (Joel Crouse, Kyle Rife, Darius Rucker, Ed Sheeran) – 3:33
4. "Hold On" (Jim Beavers, Chris Stapleton) – 3:22
5. "Turn It Up" (Hootie & the Blowfish, Trott) – 3:21
6. "Not Tonight" (DeRoberts, David Ryan Harris, Hootie & the Blowfish) – 3:20
7. "We Are One" (Hootie & the Blowfish) – 2:04
8. "Everybody but You" (Hootie & the Blowfish, Frank Rogers) – 3:30
9. "Lonely on a Saturday Night" (Hootie & the Blowfish, Paslay, Trott) – 3:10
10. "Why" (Chris August, Hootie & the Blowfish, James T. Slater) – 3:19
11. "Rollin'" (Adam Doleac, Hootie and the Blowfish, Zach Kale, John King) – 3:17
12. "Half a Day Ahead" (Hootie & the Blowfish) – 3:24
13. "Change" (Hootie & the Blowfish) – 3:27

2020 reissue:

14. "Losing My Religion" (Bill Berry, Peter Buck, Mike Mills, Michael Stipe) – 4:23

== Personnel ==
Credits adapted from the album's liner notes.

Hootie & the Blowfish

- Mark Bryan – guitar; backing vocals; piano on "Miss California"; mandolin on "Hold On", "Everybody but You", and "Change"; keyboards on "Hold On" and "Half a Day Ahead"
- Dean Felber – bass guitar, backing vocals, Moog bass on "Turn It Up" and "Half a Day Ahead"
- Darius Rucker – vocals, guitar
- Jim "Soni" Sonefeld – drums, percussion, backing vocals

Additional personnel

"New Year's Day":

- Sean Badum – assistant recording engineering
- Michael Brauer – mixing
- Elliott Elsey – vocal engineering
- Ian Fitchuk – Hammond B3 organ, piano, Wurlitzer electric piano
- Lars Fox – editing
- Joe LaPorta – mastering engineering
- Buckley Miller – programming, recording engineering
- Eric Paslay – backing vocals
- Jeff Trott – production, acoustic and electric guitars, keyboards, backing vocals

"Miss California":

- David Dorn – keyboards
- Julian King – recording engineering
- Joe LaPorta – mastering engineering
- Justin Niebank – engineering, mixing
- Bryce Roberts – assistant recording engineering
- Frank Rogers – production, baritone guitar, recording engineering
- Brian David Willis – editing

"Wildfire Love":

- Sean Badum – assistant recording engineering
- Michael Brauer – mixing
- Elliott Elsey – vocal engineering
- Joe LaPorta – mastering engineering
- Buckley Miller – programming, recording engineering
- Matt Rollings – Hammond B3 organ, piano, Wurlitzer electric piano
- Lucie Silvas – vocals on "Wild Fire Love"
- Jeff Trott – production, acoustic guitar, string arrangement
- Brian Willis – editing

"Hold On":

- David Dorn – keyboards
- Julian King – recording engineering
- Justin Niebank – engineering, mixing
- Bryce Roberts – assistant recording engineering
- Frank Rogers – production, baritone guitar, recording engineering
- Brian David Willis – editing

"Turn It Up":

- Sean Badum – assistant recording engineering
- Michael Brauer – mixing
- Sheryl Crow – backing vocals
- Elliott Elsey – vocal engineering
- Ian Fitchuk – Hammond B3 organ, Wurlitzer electric piano
- Lars Fox – editing
- Joe LaPorta – mastering engineering
- Buckley Miller – programming, recording engineering
- Charlton Singleton – trumpet
- Gavin Smith – trombone
- Mark Sterbank – tenor saxophone
- Jeff Trott – production, acoustic guitar, keyboards, backing vocals

"Not Tonight":

- Sean Badum – assistant recording engineering
- Michael Brauer – mixing
- Sheryl Crow – backing vocals
- Elliott Elsey – vocal engineering
- Ian Fitchuk – Hammond B3 organ, Wurlitzer electric piano
- Lars Fox – editing
- Joe LaPorta – mastering engineering
- Buckley Miller – programming, recording engineering
- Jeff Trott – production, acoustic guitar, backing vocals

"We Are One":

- Sean Badum – assistant recording engineering
- Michael Brauer – mixing
- Sheryl Crow – backing vocals
- Elliott Elsey – vocal engineering
- Joe LaPorta – mastering engineering
- Buckley Miller – piano, programming, recording engineering
- Jeff Trott – production, acoustic guitar, keyboards, backing vocals
- Michael Webb – Hammond B3 organ, Mellotron, piano, Wurlitzer electric piano
- Brian Willis – editing

"Everybody but You":

- David Dorn – keyboards
- Julian King – recording engineering
- Joe LaPorta – mastering engineering
- Justin Niebank – engineering, mixing
- Bryce Roberts – assistant recording engineering
- Frank Rogers – production, baritone guitar, recording engineering
- Brian David Willis – editing

"Lonely on a Saturday Night":

- Sean Badum – assistant recording engineering
- Michael Brauer – mixing
- Elliott Elsey – vocal engineering
- Ian Fitchuk – piano, Wurlitzer electric piano
- Gary Greene – percussion
- Joe LaPorta – mastering engineering
- Buckley Miller – programming, recording engineering
- Eric Paslay – backing vocals, guitar
- Jeff Trott – accordion, production, acoustic and electric guitars, keyboards, Mellotron, backing vocals
- Michael Webb – Hammond B3 organ, Mellotron, piano, Wurlitzer electric piano
- Brian Willis – editing

"Why":

- Sean Badum – assistant recording engineering
- Michael Brauer – mixing
- Elliott Elsey – vocal engineering
- Gary Greene – percussion
- Joe LaPorta – mastering engineering
- Buckley Miller – programming, recording engineering
- Eric Paslay – backing vocals, guitar
- Matt Rollings – Hammond B3 organ, Mellotron, piano, Wurlitxzer electric piano
- Jeff Trott – production, acoustic guitar, keyboards, backing vocals
- Brian Willis – editing

"Rollin'":

- Sean Badum – assistant recording engineering
- Michael Brauer – mixing
- Adam Doleac – backing vocals
- Elliott Elsey – engineering
- Ian Fitchuk – conga, Hammond B3 organ, piano, Wurlitzer electric piano
- Joe LaPorta – mastering engineering
- Buckley Miller – programming, recording engineering
- Eric Paslay – backing vocals, guitar
- Jeff Trott – production, acoustic guitar, keyboards, backing vocals
- Brian Willis – editing

"Half a Day Ahead":

- Sean Badum – assistant recording engineering
- Michael Brauer – mixing
- Elliott Elsey – vocal engineering
- Ian Fitchuk – Hammond B3 organ, Mellotron, piano, Wurlitzer electric piano
- Joe LaPorta – mastering engineering
- Buckley Miller – programming, recording engineering
- Eric Paslay – backing vocals, guitar
- Jeff Trott – production, acoustic and electric guitars, keyboards, backing vocals
- Brian Willis – editing

"Change":

- Sean Badum – assistant recording engineering
- Michael Brauer – mixing
- Elliott Elsey – vocal engineering
- Ian Fitchuk – piano
- Joe LaPorta – mastering engineering
- Buckley Miller – recording engineering
- Eric Paslay – backing vocals, guitar
- Jeff Trott – production, acoustic guitar
- Patrick Warren – strings
- Brian Willis – editing

== Charts ==
Sales chart performance for Imperfect Circle
Chart (2019)	Peak
Australian Digital Albums (ARIA)	24
Scottish Albums (OCC)	22
UK Albums (OCC)	100
US Billboard 200	26
US Top Country Albums (Billboard)	3

== See also ==
- "Perfect Circle", an R.E.M. song that inspired the title
