= Fairweather Johnson =

Studio album by Hootie & the Blowfish
- Released: April 23, 1996
- Recorded: October and November 1995
- Studios: The Site, San Rafael, California
- Genres: Roots rock; heartland rock; alternative rock; jangle pop; folk rock
- Length: 49:20
- Labels: Atlantic; 82886-2
- Producer: Don Gehman

Hootie & the Blowfish chronology
| Cracked Rear View (1994) | Fairweather Johnson (1996) | Musical Chairs (1998) |

Singles from Fairweather Johnson
- 1. "Old Man & Me (When I Get to Heaven)" Released: April 2, 1996; 2. "Tucker's Town" Released: June 25, 1996; 3. "Sad Caper" Released: 1996

Professional ratings
Review scores
| Source | Rating |
|---|---|
| AllMusic | 3/5 stars |
| Christgau’s Consumer Guide | (1-star Honorable Mention) |
| Entertainment Weekly | B |
| Los Angeles Times | 2.5/4 stars |
| Now | 1/5 stars |
| Rolling Stone | 3/5 stars |
| Spin | 5/10 |

Fairweather Johnson is the second studio album by American rock band Hootie & the Blowfish, released on April 23, 1996, through Atlantic Records. Three songs from the album were released as singles: "Old Man & Me", "Tucker's Town", and "Sad Caper". The album debuted at number one on the Billboard 200 in May 1996, while their debut, Cracked Rear View, was still in the charts. It has sold 2,361,000 copies in the US as of May 2012.

Despite its initial success, sales tapered off quickly, and the album earned mixed reviews; much of the criticism took aim at the album's dour, alt-rock inspired sound as opposed to the jangly radio-friendly style of Cracked Rear View. It was included in Pitchfork Media's 2010 list of "ten career-killing albums" of the 1990s. Stylus Magazine shared sentiments, including it in their "Non-Definitive Guide to the Follow-Up", saying "really, everyone saw this one coming a mile off. Who was really gonna care about another Hootie album?" Consequence rated the album the most disappointing sophomore album of all time.

== Track listing ==
All songs written by Mark Bryan, Dean Felber, Darius Rucker and Jim "Soni" Sonefeld.

1. "Be the One" – 3:25
2. "Sad Caper" – 2:49
3. "Tucker's Town" – 3:45
4. "She Crawls Away" – 4:25
5. "So Strange" – 4:03
6. "Old Man & Me (When I Get to Heaven)" – 4:27
7. "Earth Stopped Cold at Dawn" – 3:27
8. "Fairweather Johnson" – 0:51
9. "Honeyscrew" – 3:36
10. "Let It Breathe" – 3:53
11. "Silly Little Pop Song" – 2:56
12. "Fool" – 3:05
13. "Tootie" – 3:04
14. "When I'm Lonely" – 5:34

== Personnel ==
Hootie & the Blowfish

- Darius Rucker – lead vocals, guitar, Dobro
- Mark Bryan – guitar, backing vocals, mandolin, piano
- Dean Felber – bass, backing vocals
- Jim Sonefeld – drums, backing vocals, percussion, piano

Other musicians

- Dean Dinning – harmony vocals (track 11)
- Nanci Griffith – harmony vocals (tracks 5, 7)
- Randy Guss – tambourine (track 4)
- Lili Haydn – viola (tracks 7, 13)
- Peter Holsapple – accordion (tracks 4, 12), Hammond organ (track 3), piano (track 5)
- John Nau – Fender Rhodes (track 10), Hammond organ (tracks 1, 3, 4–6, 10, 12, 14), piano (track 2)
- Cary Phillips – infant roar (track 4)
- Glen Phillips – harmony vocals (tracks 4, 11)
- Michael Severens – cello (tracks 7, 13)

Production

- John Clark – photography
- Don Gehman – engineering, mixing, production
- Ethan Hill – photography
- Phyllis Leibowitz – stylist
- Benjamin Niles – art direction
- Eddy Schreyer – mastering

== Chart positions ==
| Chart (1996) | Peak position |
|---|---|
| Australian Albums chart | 12 |
| Canadian Albums chart | 6 |
| Dutch Albums chart | 37 |
| German Albums chart | 41 |
| New Zealand Albums chart | 6 |
| Scottish Albums chart | 9 |
| Swedish Albums chart | 36 |
| Swiss Albums chart | 37 |
| UK Albums chart | 9 |
| US Billboard 200 | 1 |

== Certifications ==
| Region | Certification | Certified units/sales |
|---|---|---|
| New Zealand (RMNZ) | Gold | 7,500^{^} |
| United Kingdom (BPI) | Gold | 100,000^{‡} |
| United States (RIAA) | 3× Platinum | 3,000,000^{^} |
^{^} Shipments figures based on certification alone.^{‡} Sales+streaming figures based on certification alone.
