= Mark Bryan =

American guitarist (born 1967)

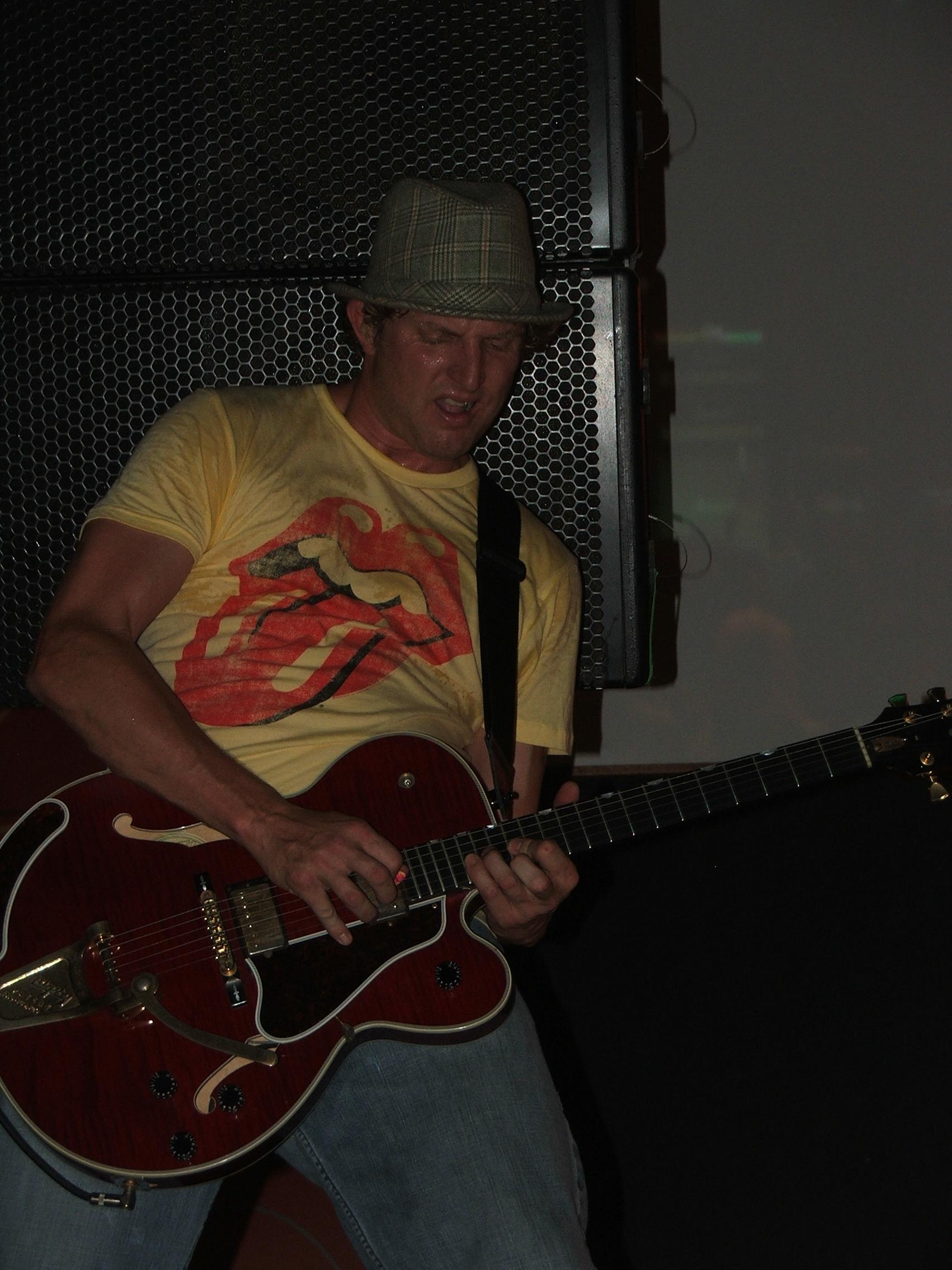
- Bryan performing with Cowboy Mouth in 2004

Background information
- Born: Mark William Bryan; May 6, 1967 (age 59)
- Origin: Silver Spring, Maryland, U.S.
- Genres: Rock; pop; country; R&B; blues
- Occupations: Musician; songwriter; producer
- Instruments: Guitar; vocals
- Years active: 1986–present
- Member of: Hootie & the Blowfish

Mark William Bryan (born May 6, 1967) is an American musician. He is the lead guitarist and a founding member and songwriter of the rock band Hootie & the Blowfish. In 1986, Bryan and his friend Darius Rucker formed a duo called the Wolf Brothers while attending the University of South Carolina. Eventually, friends Dean Felber and Jim Sonefeld joined the band, which led to the founding of Hootie & the Blowfish in 1989. Bryan has also released three solo albums: 30 on the Rail, End of the Front, and Songs of the Fortnight.

== Early life ==
Bryan was born in Silver Spring, Maryland. He attended Seneca Valley High School in Germantown, Maryland and received his bachelor's degree in broadcast journalism from the University of South Carolina in 1989.

== Career ==
While attending the university, Bryan collaborated with Darius Rucker to create an acoustic duo band called The Wolf Brothers. From there, they grew to form a new band named Hootie & the Blowfish with friends Dean Felber and Jim Sonefeld.

=== Hootie & the Blowfish ===
Hootie and the Blowfish is an American rock band formed at the University of South Carolina by Darius Rucker, Dean Felber, Jim Sonefeld, and Mark Bryan in 1986. As of July 2010, the band had charted sixteen singles on various Billboard singles charts and recorded five studio albums; and their 1994 debut album, Cracked Rear View, was the 16th-best-selling album of all time in the U.S., having been certified platinum 16 times. They have sold over 21 million albums in the United States alone. Cracked Rear View went on to earn the Billboard's Band of the Year Award in 1996 and the RIAA's Diamond Award for sales of 10 million units. Cracked Rear View remains the 12th best selling album in music business history, and all albums combined have moved over 25 million worldwide.

The band has since gone their separate ways; however, Hootie & the Blowfish still perform together numerous times each year. Bryan is a consistent participant in the Hootie & the Blowfish Monday After the Masters Celebrity Pro-Am Golf Tournament. All proceeds from this tournament go to the Hootie & the Blowfish Foundation which makes donations to education and junior golf charities. Hootie & the Blowfish also holds Hootie HomeGrown, an annual event in which they perform a concert to benefit area schools.

=== Other work ===
Since moving to Charleston, South Carolina in 1999, Bryan has produced full-length albums, as well as co-written and produced songs for other artists.

He was also involved in founding the College of Charleston Radio Station, and is helping to develop a music industry concentration there.

In 2001, Bryan founded Carolina Studios, a local nonprofit after school music recording and technology program that helps children ages 8–18 thrive in music and the arts. Bryan became a chairman on the board of Carolina Studios in 2007.

In 2012, Bryan partnered with NASCAR driver Denny Hamlin to create Pro-Am Jam, a yearly golf event for the Denny Hamlin Foundation, Carolina Studios, and Student Transportation of America Education Foundation.

In 2009, Mark created Chucktown Music Group, partnering with long-time friend Ashley Flowers in 2014. Chucktown Music Group offers services to local artists including music licensing, promotion, marketing and industry connection.

Bryan has also created, executive produced, and hosted a Southeast Emmy Award winning show called Live at the Charleston Music Hall.

Bryan created a band with Hank Futch of The Blue Dogs and Gary Greene of Cravin Melon. One of their songs, "The Great Beyond", is the theme song for Live at the Charleston Music Hall.

== Discography ==
=== Albums ===
- 30 on the Rail (2000, Atlantic Records, produced by Don Dixon)
- End of the Front (2008, produced by Fred LeBlanc/Nick Brophy/Mark Bryan)
- Songs of the Fortnight (2016)
- Midlife Priceless (2021)

=== EPs ===
- State Your Peace (2004)

=== Singles ===
- "Maybe Then (Electric)" (2012)
- "Coffee County Line" by Carolyn Evans feat. Mark Bryan (2012)
- "Be Happy Christmas" (2013)
- "Theme for Being John Daly" (2014)
- "Keep My Mouth Closed" by Bettina and Mark Bryan (2014)
- "Color Me" (2017)

=== Production credits ===
- "Doug Jones Everybody, Doug Jones" by "Doug Jones", produced by Mark Bryan (2007)
- "Thank You, Mark" by "Danielle Howle", produced by Mark Bryan (2006)
- "Six Trips Around the Sun" by "The Django Walker Band", produced by Mark Bryan (2005)
- "Wrecked" by "Five Way Friday", produced by Mark Bryan (2003)
- "Chances Are" by "Patrick Davis", produced by Mark Bryan (2003)

=== With Hootie & The Blowfish ===
- Hootie and the Blowfish (demo) with Fishco (1991)
- Kootchypop with Fishco (1993)
- Cracked Rear View with Atlantic Records (1994)
- Fairweather Johnson with Atlantic Records (1996)
- Musical Chairs with Atlantic Records (1998)
- Scattered, Smothered and Covered with Atlantic Records (2000)
- Hootie & the Blowfish with Atlantic Records (2003)
- The Best of Hootie & the Blowfish: 1993-2003 with Rhino/Atlantic Records (2004)
- Looking for Lucky with Vanguard Records (2005)
- Live in Charleston (2006)
- Imperfect Circle with Capital Nashville (2019)
