= Time (Hootie & the Blowfish song) =

1995 single by Hootie & the Blowfish

Single by Hootie & the Blowfish

from the album Cracked Rear View
- B-side: "Use Me"; "The Ballad of John & Yoko"; "Goodbye" (live)
- Released: October 24, 1995
- Length: 4:53
- Label: Atlantic
- Songwriters: Mark Bryan; Dean Felber; Darius Rucker; Jim Sonefeld
- Producer: Don Gehman

Hootie & the Blowfish singles chronology
"Only Wanna Be with You" (1995)	"Time" (1995)	"Drowning" (1995)

Music video
- "Time” on YouTube

"Time" is a song by American rock band Hootie & the Blowfish. It was released on October 24, 1995 by Atlantic Records, as the fourth single from their debut album, Cracked Rear View (1994). The song peaked at numbers 11 and 14 on the US Cash Box Top 100 and Billboard Hot 100 charts, as well as number one in Canada for one week in February 1996. It also peaked at number one on the Billboard Adult Top 40 chart, number nine in Iceland, and number 35 in New Zealand. The song's music video, directed by Frank Sacramento and produced by Myke Zykoff, was filmed in Charleston, South Carolina.

== Track listings ==
- US CD single
1. "Time"
2. "Use Me"
3. "The Ballad of John & Yoko"
- US 7-inch single

A. "Time" – 4:53
B. "Only Wanna Be with You" – 3:46

- US cassette single
1. "Time"
2. "Goodbye" (non-LP live version)

== Charts ==
=== Weekly charts ===
Chart (1996)	Peak position
Canada Top Singles (RPM)	1
Canada Adult Contemporary (RPM)	1
Iceland (Íslenski Listinn Topp 40)	9
New Zealand (Recorded Music NZ)	35
US Billboard Hot 100	14
US Adult Alternative Airplay (Billboard)	17
US Adult Contemporary (Billboard)	4
US Adult Pop Airplay (Billboard)	1
US Pop Airplay (Billboard)	5
US Cash Box Top 100	11

=== Year-end charts ===
Chart (1996)	Position
Canada Top Singles (RPM)	19
Canada Adult Contemporary (RPM)	19
Iceland (Íslenski Listinn Topp 40)	26
US Billboard Hot 100	50
US Adult Contemporary (Billboard)	24
US Adult Top 40 (Billboard)	15
US Top 40/Mainstream (Billboard)	19
