= Hold My Hand (Hootie & the Blowfish song) =

1994 single by Hootie & the Blowfish

Single by Hootie & the Blowfish

from the album Cracked Rear View
- B-side: "I Go Blind"
- Released: July 18, 1994
- Genre: Alternative rock; pop rock; roots rock
- Length: 4:15
- Label: Atlantic
- Songwriters: Mark Bryan; Dean Felber; Darius Rucker; Jim Sonefeld
- Producer: Don Gehman

Hootie & the Blowfish singles chronology
"Hold My Hand" (1994)	"Let Her Cry" (1994)

Music video
- "Hold My Hand” on YouTube

"Hold My Hand" is the debut single of the American alternative rock band Hootie & the Blowfish from their first album, Cracked Rear View (1994). All four of the band members (Mark Bryan, Dean Felber, Darius Rucker and Jim Sonefeld) wrote the song sometime in 1989, and it was released on a self-titled cassette EP the year after. Released in July 1994 by Atlantic Records, "Hold My Hand" charted at number 10 on the US Billboard Hot 100. The song includes a backing vocal from David Crosby.

== Critical reception ==
Stephen Thomas Erlewine from AllMusic said that the song "has a singalong chorus that epitomizes the band's good-times vibes." Pan-European magazine Music & Media wrote, "Don't give up, here's new hope. Only images of Brazilian footballers holding hands can equal the optimism and camaraderie reflected by this country rock song in a gospel spirit."

== Chart performance ==
"Hold My Hand" peaked at number 10 on the US Billboard Hot 100 and number six on Billboard Hot Adult Contemporary Tracks chart. It ended the year at number 22 on the Billboard year-end chart for 1995.

== Music video ==
The accompanying music video for "Hold My Hand" was directed by American filmmaker and director of music videos, Adolfo Doring.

== Charts ==
=== Weekly charts ===
Chart (1994–1995)	Peak position
Australia (ARIA)	70
Canada Top Singles (RPM)	36
European Hit Radio Top 40 (Music & Media)	40
France Radio (SNEP)	89
New Zealand (Recorded Music NZ)	37
Scottish Singles Sales (Official Charts)	27
UK Singles (Official Charts)	50
US Billboard Hot 100	10
US Adult Contemporary (Billboard)	6
US Adult Pop Airplay (Billboard)	25
US Mainstream Rock (Billboard)	4
US Pop Airplay (Billboard)	2
US Cash Box Top 100	5

=== Year-end charts ===
Chart (1994)	Position
US Album Rock Tracks (Billboard)	30

Chart (1995)	Position
Brazil (Crowley)	92
US Billboard Hot 100	22
US Adult Contemporary (Billboard)	9
US Top 40/Mainstream (Billboard)	9
US Cash Box Top 100	32

== Certifications ==
Certifications for "Hold My Hand"
Region	Certification	Certified units/sales
New Zealand (RMNZ)	Platinum	30,000^{‡}
^{‡} Sales+streaming figures based on certification alone.

== Release history ==
Region	Date	Format(s)	Label(s)	Ref.
United States	July 18, 1994	Radio	Atlantic	
Australia	October 10, 1994	CD	Atlantic	
United Kingdom	February 13, 1995	CD; cassette	Atlantic	

== See also ==
- Bottle Rockets
