= Don Gehman =

American record producer

- Born: Blue Ball, Pennsylvania, U.S.
- Occupation: Record producer
- Years active: 1976–present
- Employer: Rhapsody Productions

Don Gehman is an American record producer, engineer, and executive, best known for his work with John Mellencamp and Hootie & the Blowfish. AllMusic calls him one of "the most successful producers of the 1980s and 1990s." As a sound engineer, he also helped invent the modern rock P.A. and monitor systems.

== Early life ==
Gehman was born in Blue Ball, Pennsylvania. As a child, he was interested in science and his parents' Magnavox stereo. His interests evolved from a photography dark room in the basement to chemistry to physics to electronics.

Gehman played bass guitar in a rock band when he was fourteen years old. He became interested in music technology after learning how to set up the band's P.A. sound system. He started building his amplifiers. Soon, he was building P.A. systems for events and local bands. He met Gene Clair at a local electronics store in 1964; Clair was also assembling P.A. systems in his basement. Clair invited the teenaged Gehman to join his new business, Clair Brothers Sound.

== Career ==
=== Clair Brothers ===
In 1969, Gehman became a sound engineer with Clair Brothers Sound, a position he kept for seven years. Music journalist and producer Tim Sommer says that Clair and Gehman "virtually invented the modern rock band P.A. system and were the first people to create functional P.A. systems that bands could bring on the road with them." Clair Brothers also allowed bands to hear themselves on stage for the first time with their invention of the stage monitor system. Strommer notes, Clair Brothers "was the Apple of live performance and sound equipment. …This is Edison level shit we are talking about."

Soon, Gehman began traveling with bands and their equipment, doing as many as 300 one-night shows a year. He worked with various well-known acts of the era, including James Brown; Blood, Sweat & Tears; Chicago; Crosby, Stills, Nash, & Young; The Four Seasons; the Four Tops; the James Gang; Loggins & Messina; The Supremes; The Temptations; and Yes. Although he still found time to work in the studio; in 1975, he was the engineer for Eric Clapton's There's One in Every Crowd and Stephen Stills' album Stills.

=== Stephen Stills ===
Being the engineer for Stephen Stills' album Stills was the beginning of their studio collaboration. Gehman said, "I had been on the road for about seven years—off and on. Well, actually, quite consistently for about three years, I was getting pretty burned out. The conditions working on the road in the seventies were really horrible. Nothing like it is today. I just felt that if I was going to live, I'd better find myself another job. I started asking around. Stephen mentioned he was working at Caribou Studios in Colorado on a new solo album and needed some help." After spending a week locked in the studio with Stills in 1973, Gehman earned his first production credit on Stills' 1976 solo album Illegal Stills.

That same year, Gehman produced Long May You Run for The Stills-Young Band, a collaboration of Neil Young with Stephen Stills.

=== Criteria Studios ===
With Stills' help, Gehman became an engineer at Criteria Studios in Miami, Florida. He says, "Quite frankly, the quality of that record [Illegal Stills] was so poor that it scared me right out of the producing business, and into the engineering business. The engineering thing was actually something that was pretty easy for me, because that's what I had been doing for years. I didn't know how to make a record, but I knew how to run that equipment from being on the road." Because Gehman brought a stable of clients with him and had experience as a live show engineer, he started working as a studio engineer at a better-than-entry level, despite not knowing the recording industry. However, he learned from the producers who came to Criteria, including Tom Dowd, Phil Ramone, and Bill Sczymczyk.

At Criteria, Gehman was the recording engineer for the Bee Gees, Eric Clapton, Firefall, Robin Trower, Barbra Streisand, and Jesse Colin Young. In 1978, he was the engineer for Back to Earth by Cat Stevens, Hot Streets by Chicago, and Double Dose by Hot Tuna. He was also the engineer of Pure Prairie League's Can't Hold Back which was released in 1979. He mixed Joy Division's single "Love Will Tear Us Apart" which was released 1980.

=== John Mellencamp ===
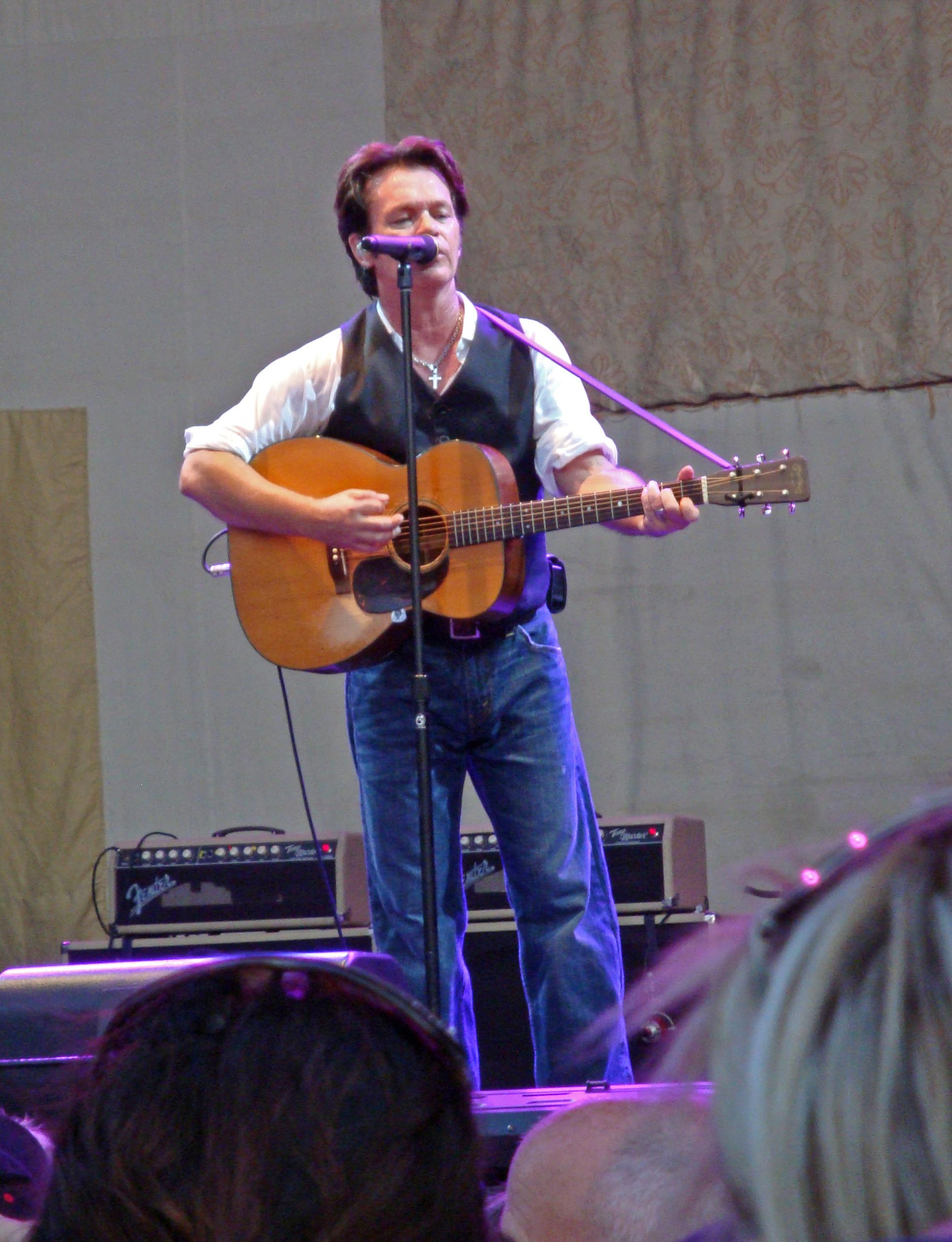
John Mellencamp

In 1979 and 1980, Gehman began working with John Mellencamp who was then known as John Cougar, engineering the self-titled album John Cougar. Mellencamp came to Criteria to work with Tom Dowd; Dowd was not available and Gehman did much of the work on the project. Mellencamp returned to Gehman to co-produce his 1982 release, American Fool.

Mellencamp recalls, "Really, Don Gehman's job was to keep me from not going crazy all the time. Back then, I was very angry, always mad at somebody or something, fighting and screaming. Not a very pleasant person. Don's job was to go, 'John, you're out of line. John, you don't need to do that—stop it." Gehman also oversaw the setup The Shack, a studio in Indiana for Mellencamp, moving equipment from Criteria to the new location.

American Fool yielded the hits "Hurts So Good" and "Jack and Diane," and resulted in a Grammy Award nomination for Gehman. The album also went multi-platinum. Gehman continued to produce albums for Mellencamp, including 1983's Uh-Huh and 1985's Scarecrow. They worked on the album March through April, with Gehman on the board. Gehman noted, "It was probably easier than previous albums because we had our own studio, but the process was still very much the same. John would go in with the band first of all. They'd work up the arrangements among themselves and then John would tear things apart and put them back together. I'd come in and try to figure out how to make it sound decent. Then he would realize it wasn't what he was looking for and we'd rip it all apart again. That was kind of the way things were. We'd have a plan, but never follow through on it. Five minutes in, we'd see it another way "

Gehman also produced 1987's The Lonesome Jubilee which earned another Grammy nomination for Gehman. However, that was his last project for Mellencamp.

=== R.E.M. ===
Gehman produced R.E.M.'s album Lifes Rich Pageant, which was released in 1986. R.E.M. was familiar with Gehman's work with Mellencamp; although they did not like that music, they appreciated that Gehman was able to achieve a sound that was "AOR friendly" and yet still retained a roots-rock sound. Mike Mills says, "We wanted a clearer, more powerful sound." This meant achieving upfront vocals and a bigger drum sound. In short, "if R.E.M. were to make a jump into mainstream, Gehman was a better than average bet."

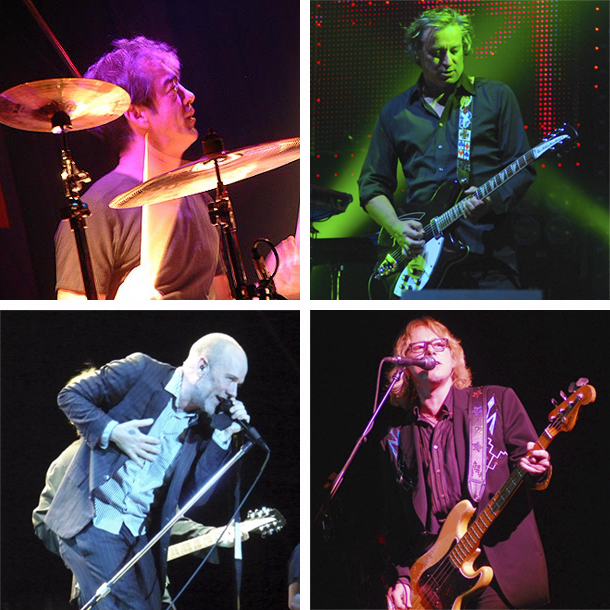
R.E.M. (From left, clockwise: BIll Berry, Peter Buck, Mike Mills, and Michael Stipe)

Yet, the partnership was not a sure thing—Gehman attended a live R.E.M. show, recalling, "I was intrigued. I wouldn't say impressed." In addition, the band asked Gehman to come to Athens, Georgia, for a trial run. He recalls, "They were leery of record companies, and they were leery of anyone who would be answering to a record company. And so that made them leery of me." In addition, the trial studio experience of recording demos was a challenge for both parties—John Kean noted, "Gehman was a little taken aback by their insistence on doing things their own way. They definitely weren't accustomed to taking directions from anyone." Even if Gehman didn't understand how R.E.M. operated, he knew how to make hit records. He says, "I think they were taken aback at the process that I worked in. I didn't just record things—I liked to spend time on the arrangement and layer in the overdubs and comp the vocals—all this process which, to me, was normal record-making, they had never been through before. When they saw that kind of record-making process didn't take anything away—that it actually added another level of artistic expression—they were very excited by it. That's when they said, 'Let's go make a record.'"

They decided to record the album at the Belmont Mall Studio, which Gehman had built for Mellencamp in Belmont, Indiana, in April and May 1986. Gehman says, "Making that record was a blast. There was a tremendous amount of creative energy, it just came flying out. Also, between me and them, there was that chemistry that you hear about. I was enough of a disciplinarian to make sure everybody got the job done. Other than that, I was willing to accept their ideas and they were willing to accept mine."

In the studio, Gehman pushed his rule that listeners should be able to understand a song's lyrics. Michael Stipe recalled, "[Gehman was] the first person to challenge me on my lyrics, just saying. 'What the f*ck is this about?' I crossed my arms and walked out of the room." Gehman was just looking for less "self-indulgence." Gehman also introduced a special microphone that removed Stipe's singing lisp, making the vocals easier to understand. He allowed Mills to experiment with a variety of keyboards to add textures to the music, challenged Peter Buck to consider why he made certain choices with his guitar playing, and gave Bill Berry the drum sound he had always wanted.

Ultimately, Stipe realized their producer knew what he was doing. Yet, Stipe says, "The direction of Don Gehman pushed me in Lifes Rich Pageant really paralyzed me for several records because he had such an idea for what a vocal should be, that it threw me into this place of wild insecurity." Regardless, the fans and reviewers were impressed, and it yielded the band its first gold record and first hit single, with "Fall On Me" reaching number five on Billboard's Mainstream Rock Chart; however, the band believed that Gehman's "meticulously high standards" meant he did not consider the album a complete success. When getting ready for their next album Buck says, "We were talking to Don, but he was getting kinda cold feet. He was saying, 'I really want to make a record that's a huge commercial success, and as much as I like you all as people, and I like the band, the way you work, I can't hear that you're going to have a huge hit.'" When Gehman was not available as readily as the band wanted for their next recording needs, he recommended Scott Litt who went on to work with the band on future projects.

Gehman did teach the band, especially Mills, how to arrange songs. Gehman said, "I felt I was responsible for giving them a set of tools that worked for them. I showed them a methodology of approaching a song, and production and sound, and they just took it to the next step."

=== Other 1980s projects ===
In 1982, Gehman engineered, mixed, and co-produced Michael Stanley Band's album, MSB. He produced Eric Carmen's self titled 1984 album, Eric Carmen, along with Billy Satellite's 1984 eponymous album. Gehman's other production credits of the era include The Knife Feels Like Justice by Brian Setzer in 1986, Tied to the Tracks by Treat Her Right in 1989, After Here Through Midland by Cock Robin in 1987, Victory Day by Tom Cochran in 1988, Say Something Good by River City People in 1989.

=== Australia ===
In the early 1990s, most of Gehman's work was in Australia with several lower-profile acts. He produced four albums with Jimmy Barnes, including 1990's Two Fires, 1991's Soul Deep, 1993's Heat, and 1994's Flesh and Wood. In 1991, he produced a greatest hits album for Andy Gibb. In 1992, he produced Hunters and Collectors's most successful album Cut, included the rock anthem "Holy Grail." While producing Cut, Gehman added electronic percussion and drum loops. In an article in Rolling Stone (Australia), Gehman said, "They wanted change but when it came to it there was a lot of mumbling in the ranks, there was resistance, but I just stuck to my guns." In October 1992, he also produced Diesel's album Hepfidelity which was released in 1993.

=== Hootie & the Blowfish ===
Gehman says, "My career was kind of in a slump. I was looking for a way to work into this whole alternative, new band movement. Figuring it was not much different than what I had been doing for a long time. I was making the rounds of new A&R people, that I had yet to meet. One of them was Tim Sommer, who had just signed Hootie [& the Blowfish] to Atlantic. He wasn't sure yet if they wanted to remix an existing CD the band had made or make a new one. He thought that I might be interested in the band. The band had already expressed an interest in me. He played me the tape, and I liked it. They sent me off to meet with the band."

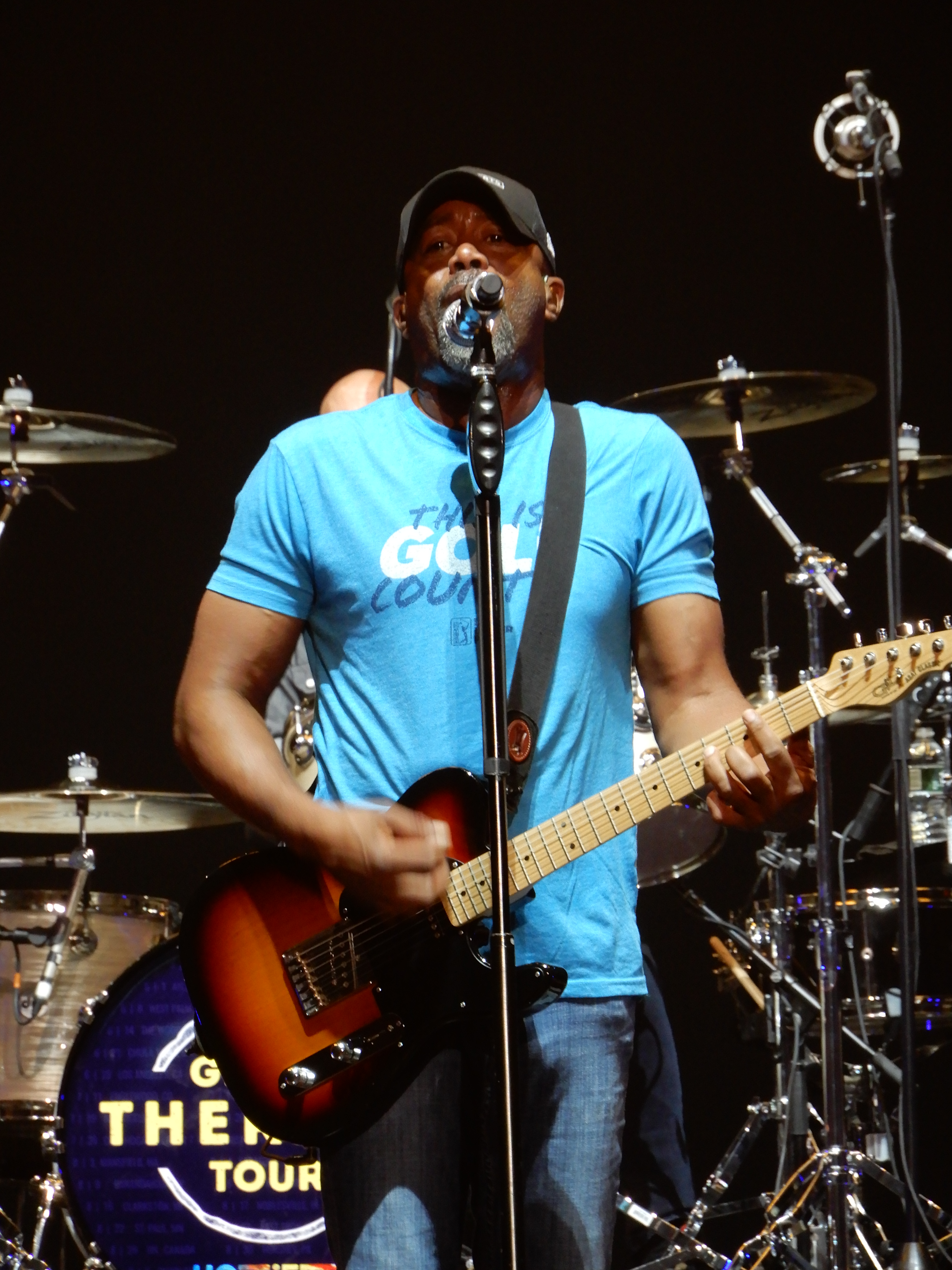
Darius Rucker of Hootie & the Blowfish

He worked with Hootie & the Blowfish, producing 1994's Cracked Rear View. Darius Rucker, lead singer of the band says one of Gehman's tasks was to get the band to shorten some of their songs so that they could be played on the radio. Gehman says, "Most of the work that I contributed was really just editing things down a little. Because they are such a strong live band—used to playing club gigs and stretching things out—the songs were a little long. I think I chopped a good minute out of most of the songs because they had an extra verse or they'd repeat the first verse or the chorus again, so they weren't really radio-ready to my liking. And the band was very willing to make changes."

The turnaround on Cracked Rear View was quick, with just eighteen days to record and mix the album. The album also had a budget of only $75,000, requiring Gehman to serve as an engineer. It also meant that they needed reliable equipment—his solution was to bring his own. He also brought some instruments that he knew would provide a good sound. He spent a total of 28 days on the record, including twenty days of recording and eight days of mixing. This equated to six weeks because he worked only five days a week. Gehman says, "I've gotta say that this was probably one of the most charmed projects I've ever worked on. Of course, when I started out on the Hootie project, I thought to myself, 'Well, this is gonna be just an okay little album.' But as we went along, I became more and more excited about it, and by the time I was mixing it, it was like, 'Wow!'"

Despite the limitations, the album yielded several hits, including "Hold My Hand," "Let Her Cry," and "Only Wanna Be with You," and was the best-selling album of 1995. Rucker, recalls, "Don was so laid back, and he instantly and knew how to handle each of us in our own way. Making that record will always go down as one of the greatest moments of my life." Gehman also worked with Hootie and the Blowfish on their album Fairweather Johnson which was released in 1996. He was the producer, engineer, and mixer for their Musical Chairs which was released in 1998, and the mixer and producer for their Looking for Lucky which was released in 2005.

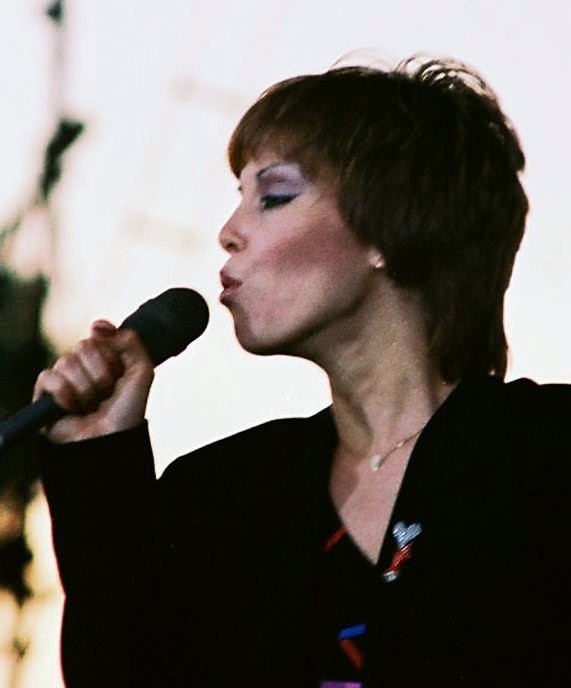
Pat Benatar

=== Other 1990s projects ===
He produced A Night on the Town by Bruce Hornsby & the Range which was released in 1990.

He worked with Pat Benatar for her 1993 album Gravity's Rainbow and for her greatest hits album All Fired Up: The Very Best of Pat Benatar in 1994. He then produced 1996's Friction Baby for Better Than Ezra and 1997's Blue Roses from the Moons for Nanci Griffith, as well as her Other Voices, Too in 1998. In the late 1990s, Gehman became head of Refuge Records, a new label of MCA Records.

=== 21st-century projects ===
In the 21st-century, Gehman has continued working, producing Familiar 48's Wonderful Nothing in 2002 and Jason Michael Carroll's Waitin' in the Country in 2007. He also produced Blues Traveler's Truth Be Told in 2003. Blue's Traveler's John Popper wrote, "Working with Don Gehman was a huge treat because he had done so many albums I didn't even know I liked. There's one song on there, "Unable to Get Free," that was actually inspired by an old Barbra Streisand tune, "Woman in Love," that, it turned out, Don Gehman had recorded and engineered. I discovered this while we were talking about it. I referred to this Barbara tune as far as the emotional pang I wanted my voice to hit, and he said, 'Oh yeah, I did that song,' which in itself, blew me away." In addition, Gehman gave the band the freedom to resolve small details while recording, something that was a first for them.

He was the producer of Give Me Strength: The '74/'75 Studio Recordings of Eric Clapton which was released in 2013 and the Neil Young Archives Volume II: 1972–1976 which was released in 2021 by Neil Young. He also worked on greatest hits albums, box sets, or collections for Jimmy Barnes, Better Than Ezra, Blues Traveler, Boom Crash Opera, Harry Chapin, Tracy Chapman, Chicago, Foreigner, Bruce Hornsby, Hootie & the Blowfish, Jonah Koslen, R.E.M., and Stephen Stills.

== Award nominations ==
Gehman has been nominated for seven Grammy Awards but had yet to win one.

- 1982 Album of the Year – American Fool by John Cougar
- 1982 Best Engineered Recording - Non-Classical – American Fool by John Cougar
- 1982 Producer of the Year
- 1987 Producer of the Year (Non-Classical)
- 1996 Best Pop Album – New Beginning by Tracy Chapman
- 1996 Record of the Year – "Give Me One Reason" by Tracy Chapman
- 1996 Producer of the Year

== See also ==
- List of albums produced by Don Gehman
