= Let Her Cry =

1994 single by Hootie & the Blowfish

Single by Hootie & the Blowfish

from the album Cracked Rear View
- B-side: "Fine Line"; "Almost Home"
- Released: December 1994
- Genre: Pop rock; country rock
- Length: 5:09 (album version); 4:12 (radio edit)
- Label: Atlantic
- Songwriters: Mark Bryan; Dean Felber; Darius Rucker; Jim "Soni" Sonefeld
- Producer: Don Gehman

Hootie & the Blowfish singles chronology
"Hold My Hand" (1994)	"Let Her Cry" (1994)	"Only Wanna Be with You" (1995)

Music video
- "Let Her Cry" on YouTube

"Let Her Cry" is a song by American rock band Hootie & the Blowfish. It was released in December 1994 as the second single from their debut album, Cracked Rear View (1994), and became a top-10 hit in Australia, Canada, Iceland, and the United States. The song received the Grammy Award for Best Pop Performance by a Duo or Group with Vocals in 1996.

== Origins ==
In 2008, lead singer Darius Rucker recalled that he had just listened to the song "She Talks to Angels" by the Black Crowes for the first time and was listening to a record by blues singer Bonnie Raitt and "in one stream of consciousness" wrote the lyrics to the song.

== Chart performance ==
The single reached the number-two position on the US Billboard Top 40/Mainstream chart and number nine on the Billboard Hot 100. It also peaked at number two on the Canadian RPM 100 Hit Tracks chart and number four on the Australian Singles Chart.

== Music video ==
The music video for "Let Her Cry" was directed by American director Adolfo Doring. The video was shot in a sepia tone and features the band singing the song intercut with a young woman who runs around a city in the rain.

== Track listings ==
- US maxi-CD single
1. "Let Her Cry" (radio edit) – 4:12
2. "Fine Line" – 3:29
3. "Almost Home" – 3:58
4. "Let Her Cry" (LP version) – 5:09
- US cassette single
1. "Let Her Cry" (radio edit)
2. "Let Her Cry" (LP version)
- Australian CD and cassette single
1. "Let Her Cry" (radio edit) – 4:12
2. "Let Her Cry" (LP version) – 5:09
3. "Where Were You" – 3:50
4. "Fine Line" – 3:30
- UK CD1
1. "Let Her Cry" (LP version) – 5:07
2. "Hannah Jane" (live version) – 4:05
3. "Where Were You" – 3:51
4. "Fine Line" – 3:30
- UK CD2
1. "Let Her Cry" (edit) – 4:10
2. "Goodbye" (live version) – 4:11
3. "The Ballad of John and Yoko" (live) – 3:45
4. "Hold My Hand" (live version) – 5:47

== Charts ==
=== Weekly charts ===
Chart (1995)	Peak position
Australia (ARIA)	4
Canada Top Singles (RPM)	2
Canada Adult Contemporary (RPM)	7
Germany (GfK)	78
Hungary Airplay (Music & Media)	12
Iceland (Íslenski Listinn Topp 40)	4
New Zealand (Recorded Music NZ)	19
Scottish Singles Sales (Official Charts)	62
UK Singles (Official Charts)	75
US Billboard Hot 100	9
US Adult Contemporary (Billboard)	6
US Adult Pop Airplay (Billboard)	16
US Alternative Airplay (Billboard)	34
US Mainstream Rock (Billboard)	9
US Pop Airplay (Billboard)	2
US Cash Box Top 100	4

=== Year-end charts ===
Chart (1995)	Position
Australia (ARIA)	48
Brazil (Crowley)	72
Canada Top Singles (RPM)	25
Canada Adult Contemporary (RPM)	70
Iceland (Íslenski Listinn Topp 40)	66
New Zealand (RIANZ)	41
US Billboard Hot 100	26
US Adult Contemporary (Billboard)	19
US Album Rock Tracks (Billboard)	25
US Top 40/Mainstream (Billboard)	13
US Cash Box Top 100	39

== Certifications ==
Region	Certification	Certified units/sales
Australia (ARIA)	Gold	35,000^{^}
^{^} Shipments figures based on certification alone.

== Release history ==
Region	Date	Format(s)	Label(s)	Ref.
United States	December 1994	—N/a	Atlantic	
United Kingdom	May 15, 1995	CD; cassette	Atlantic	
Australia	June 19, 1995	CD	Atlantic	
Australia	August 14, 1995	Cassette	Atlantic	
