= Looking for Lucky =

Studio album by Hootie & the Blowfish
- Released: August 9, 2005
- Recorded: October 2004 – April 2005
- Studio: Nashville, Tennessee
- Genre: Soft rock
- Length: 42:22
- Labels: Sneaky Long; Vanguard
- Producer: Don Gehman

Hootie & the Blowfish chronology
The Best of Hootie & the Blowfish: 1993–2003 (2004)	Looking for Lucky (2005)	Live in Charleston (2006)

Professional ratings
Review scores
Source	Rating
AllMusic	3.5/5 stars
Chicago Tribune	(unfavorable)
Rolling Stone	2.5/5 stars
Slant	3/5 stars

Looking for Lucky is the fifth studio album by American rock band Hootie & the Blowfish, released on August 9, 2005. The album sold 128,000 copies in the U.S. up to March 2009.

== Track listing ==
1. "State Your Peace" – 3:37
2. "Hey Sister Pretty" – 3:25
3. "The Killing Stone" – 4:27
4. "Get Out of My Mind" – 2:58
5. "Another Year's Gone By" – 3:44
6. "Can I See You" – 3:38
7. "A Smile" – 3:49
8. "One Love" – 4:06
9. "Leaving" – 2:35
10. "Autumn Jones" – 3:27
11. "Free to Everyone" – 3:23
12. "Waltz into Me" – 3:13

== Personnel ==
Hootie & the Blowfish

- Mark Bryan – background vocals, guitar, lap steel guitar, mandolin
- Dean Felber – background vocals, bass guitar
- Darius Rucker – background and lead vocals
- Jim Sonefeld – background vocals, drums, percussion, piano

Other musicians

- Matraca Berg – background vocals
- Sam Bush – fiddle, mandolin, vocal harmony
- John Cowan – vocal harmony
- John Hobbs – Mellotron, organ, piano
- Steve Nathan – organ
- Ryan Newell – slide guitar

Production

- Georgette Cartwright – Creative services coordinator
- Mark Dearnley – Engineer, mixing
- Robin Geary – Hair stylist, make-up
- Don Gehman – Mixing, producer
- Greg Lawrence – Assistant
- Bob Ludwig – Mastering
- Shannon Shepherd – Stylist
- Ann Smalley – Cover design
- Mark Tucker – Cover design, photography
- Amy L. VonHolzhausen – Cover design, creative director

== Chart positions ==
Chart (2005)	Peak position
US Billboard 200	47
