= Only Wanna Be with You =

1995 single by Hootie & the Blowfish

Single by Hootie & the Blowfish

from the album Cracked Rear View and the EP Kootchypop
- Released: July 1995
- Genre: Alternative rock; soft rock; roots rock
- Length: 3:50
- Label: Atlantic
- Songwriters: Mark Bryan; Dean Felber; Darius Rucker; Jim Sonefeld
- Producer: Don Gehman

Hootie & the Blowfish singles chronology
"Let Her Cry" (1994)	"Only Wanna Be with You" (1995)	"Time" (1995)

Music video
- "Only Wanna Be With You" on YouTube

"Only Wanna Be with You" is a song by American alternative rock band Hootie & the Blowfish. After being included on the group's EP Kootchypop (1993), it was released in July 1995 as the third single from their breakthrough album, Cracked Rear View (1994). The song was successful in the United States, peaking at number six on the Billboard Hot 100, and charted in several other countries, including Canada, where it reached number one for three weeks. In 2021, American singer and rapper Post Malone released a cover of the song for the 25th anniversary of the Pokémon franchise.

== Content ==
One verse of the song describes "[putting] on a little Dylan". The verse then references songs on Bob Dylan's Blood on the Tracks, quoting extensively from "Idiot Wind". The song then mentions "Tangled Up in Blue". According to Rucker, Dylan's management were aware of the lyrics and had no problem with them; however, when the song became a hit, they objected. He told Rolling Stone that "it never got to the point where we were sued... When we first did that song we sent it to the publishing company and everything was fine. We played it for years and had a really big hit with it. Then they wanted some money, and they got it." VH1 reported that Dylan received an out-of-court settlement in 1995 for $350,000 (equivalent to $740,000 in 2025).

Also mentioned in the bridge of the song is a reference, "I'm such a baby 'cause the Dolphins make me cry", alluding to Darius Rucker's favorite sports team, the Miami Dolphins.

== Critical reception ==
Steve Baltin from Cash Box named "Only Wanna Be with You" Pick of the Week, writing that "this catchy upbeat gem shows why Hootie & The Blowfish can do no wrong when it comes to the charts." He added, "Hootie’s sound is never more mainstream than it is here, as the rocking and danceable beat is accompanied by a perky chorus of "I only wanna be with you." Like their previous hit singles, this track will rocket up the charts, gaining huge support from AAA and CHR."

== Chart performance ==
In the United States, "Only Wanna Be with You" peaked at number six on the Billboard Hot 100, number one on the Billboard Top 40/Mainstream chart, number three on the Billboard Adult Contemporary chart, and number two on the Billboard Album Rock Tracks and Adult Top 40 charts. In December 1995, Billboard ranked the song as the 33rd-most-successful hit of the year, and its continued success into 1996 allowed it to rank in at number 99 for that year. In Canada, the song topped the RPM 100 Hit Tracks chart for three nonconsecutive weeks, ending 1995 as Canada's second-most-successful song. It also entered the top 10 in Iceland, rising to number four on the Icelandic Singles Chart, and in El Salvador, where it peaked at number six. In Australia and New Zealand, the single entered the top 40, peaking at numbers 40 and 17, respectively. In New Zealand, the song received a double-platinum certification for sales and streaming figures exceeding 60,000 units.

== Music video ==
The accompanying music video for "Only Wanna Be with You", similar to the song, had a sports theme, incorporating many elements from ESPN's SportsCenter. The video featured appearances by then-current SportsCenter anchors Keith Olbermann, Dan Patrick, Mike Tirico, Charley Steiner and Chris Berman, reporting on the band playing in games with several professional athletes, including Dan Marino, Fred Couples, Gary McCord, Alonzo Mourning, Muggsy Bogues, Alex English, Walt Williams, and Charles Smith. Rucker said the video was his idea, adding, "It was just a way to meet all our idols."

A portion of the music video was filmed on the Poolesville Golf Course and Potomac Valley Lodge in Poolesville, Maryland, as well as on the floor of Reckord Armory at the University of Maryland. Additionally, the scenes in which Rucker and Dan Marino are playing catch were filmed on the football field of Hinsdale Central High School in Hinsdale, Illinois.

== Track listings ==
US cassette single
No.	Title	Length
1.	"Only Wanna Be with You" (radio edit)
2.	"Where Were You"

European and Australian CD single
No.	Title	Length
1.	"Only Wanna Be with You"	3:46
2.	"Use Me" (live)	5:11
3.	"Only Wanna Be with You" (live)	4:00

== Charts ==
=== Weekly charts ===
Weekly chart performance for "Only Wanna Be with You"
Chart (1995–1996)	Peak position
Australia (ARIA)	40
Canada Top Singles (RPM)	1
Canada Adult Contemporary (RPM)	1
El Salvador (El Siglo de Torreón)	6
European Hit Radio Top 40 (Music & Media)	26
Germany (GfK)	65
Iceland (Íslenski Listinn Topp 40)	4
Netherlands (Dutch Top 40 Tipparade)	9
Netherlands (Single Top 100)	44
New Zealand (Recorded Music NZ)	17
Scottish Singles Sales (Official Charts)	83
UK Singles (Official Charts)	85
US Billboard Hot 100	6
US Adult Contemporary (Billboard)	3
US Adult Pop Airplay (Billboard)	2
US Alternative Airplay (Billboard)	22
US Mainstream Rock Airplay (Billboard)	2
US Pop Airplay (Billboard)	1
US Cash Box Top 100	5

=== Year-end charts ===
1995 year-end chart performance for "Only Wanna Be with You"
Chart (1995)	Position
Brazil (Crowley)	63
Canada Top Singles (RPM)	2
Canada Adult Contemporary (RPM)	23
Iceland (Íslenski Listinn Topp 40)	15
US Billboard Hot 100	33
US Adult Contemporary (Billboard)	20
US Album Rock Tracks (Billboard)	15
US Top 40/Mainstream (Billboard)	15
US Cash Box Top 100	18

1996 year-end chart performance for "Only Wanna Be with You"
Chart (1996)	Position
US Billboard Hot 100	99
US Adult Contemporary (Billboard)	10
US Adult Top 40 (Billboard)	29
US Top 40/Mainstream (Billboard)	80

== Certifications ==
Certifications for "Only Wanna Be with You"
Region	Certification	Certified units/sales
New Zealand (RMNZ)	2× Platinum	60,000^{‡}
^{‡} Sales+streaming figures based on certification alone.

== Release history ==
Release dates and formats for "Only Wanna Be with You"
Region	Date	Format(s)	Label(s)	Ref.
United States	May 1995	Adult contemporary; album rock; modern rock radio	Atlantic	
United States	July 1995	Cassette	Atlantic	
United States	July 25, 1995	Contemporary hit radio	Atlantic	
United Kingdom	August 21, 1995	CD; cassette	Atlantic	
Australia	October 2, 1995	CD	Atlantic	

== Post Malone version ==
"Only Wanna Be with You (Pokémon 25 Version)"

Single by Post Malone

from the album Pokémon 25: The Album
- Released: February 25, 2021
- Length: 4:01
- Label: Republic; Capitol
- Songwriters: Mark Bryan; Dean Felber; Darius Rucker; Jim Sonefeld
- Producers: Louis Bell; Andrew Watt

Post Malone singles chronology
"Spicy" (2020)	"Only Wanna Be with You (Pokémon 25 Version)" (2021)	"Life's a Mess II" (2021)

Pokémon 25 singles chronology
"Only Wanna Be with You (Pokémon 25 Version)" (2021)	"Electric" (2021)

Music video
- "Only Wanna Be with You (Pokémon 25 Version)" on YouTube

On February 25, 2021, American musician Post Malone released a cover version for the 25th anniversary of the Japanese media franchise Pokémon. Malone's version contains samples of music from the video games and the Dolphins reference changed to reflect him being a Dallas Cowboys fan. The cover garnered attention for the unusual circumstances of its release. Hootie and the Blowfish vocalist Darius Rucker gave his approval of the cover on Twitter. "Only Wanna Be with You" is included on the track listing of Pokémon 25: The Album, released in October 2021 through Capitol Records.

=== Charts ===
Weekly chart performance for "Only Wanna Be with You (Pokémon 25 Version)"
Chart (2021)	Peak position
Canada Hot 100 (Billboard)	58
Croatia (HRT)	73
Czech Republic Airplay (ČNS IFPI)	17
Hungary (Rádiós Top 40)	28
Ireland (IRMA)	55
Latvia (EHR)	40
Netherlands (Single Tip)	1
New Zealand Hot Singles (RMNZ)	7
Norway (VG-lista)	34
San Marino (SMRRTV Top 50)	43
Slovakia Airplay (ČNS IFPI)	17
Sweden (Sverigetopplistan)	33
UK Singles (Official Charts)	76
US Billboard Hot 100	74
US Alternative Airplay (Billboard)	37
