= Hey, Hey, What Can I Do =

Single by Led Zeppelin
- A-side: "Immigrant Song"
- Released: 5 November 1970
- Recorded: May–June 1970 (?); 29 May 1970
- Studio: Rolling Stones Mobile Studio, Headley Grange, Hampshire; Olympic Sound Studios, London
- Genre: Country rock
- Length: 3:55
- Label: Atlantic
- Songwriters: John Bonham; John Paul Jones; Jimmy Page; Robert Plant
- Producer: Jimmy Page

"Hey, Hey, What Can I Do" is a rock ballad song by the English rock band Led Zeppelin, released in 1970 as the B-side of the single "Immigrant Song" in the US.

== Releases ==
After its release on a single, "Hey, Hey, What Can I Do" was included on the Atlantic Records compilation album The New Age of Atlantic in 1972. (Note: Some pressings of the US single (Atlantic 45-2777) list "From Atlantic LP 19128 "LED ZEPPELIN III", which only applies to the A-side, "Immigrant Song".) The song was first released on CD in September 1990, on the Led Zeppelin Boxed Set collection. In 1992, as a 20th-anniversary release, "Immigrant Song"/"Hey, Hey What Can I Do" was issued as a "vinyl replica" CD single.

In 1993, the song was included on The Complete Studio Recordings 10-CD box set, as one of four bonus tracks on the Coda disc as well as the subsequent 12-CD Led Zeppelin Definitive Collection box set released in 2008. In 2015, the song was also included on disc one of the two companion discs of the reissue of Coda.

== Critical reception ==
ClassicRockHistory.com wrote: "I was completely blown away when I heard that country-esque introduction to 'Hey Hey What Can I do.'" AllMusic reviewed the 2000 single version by Jimmy Page & The Black Crowes and said: "This single, however, is useless to all but a completist, as the only track is the LP version and there are no exciting extras at all."

== Personnel ==
According to Jean-Michel Guesdon and Philippe Margotin:

- Robert Plant – vocals
- Jimmy Page – acoustic guitars (six-string and twelve-string)
- John Paul Jones – bass, mandolin
- John Bonham – drums

== See also ==
- List of cover versions of Led Zeppelin songs – "Hey, Hey, What Can I Do" entries

== Bibliography ==
- Guesdon, Jean-Michel; Margotin, Philippe (2018). Led Zeppelin All the Songs: The Story Behind Every Track. Running Press. ISBN 978-0-316-448-67-3.
