= Darius Rucker discography =

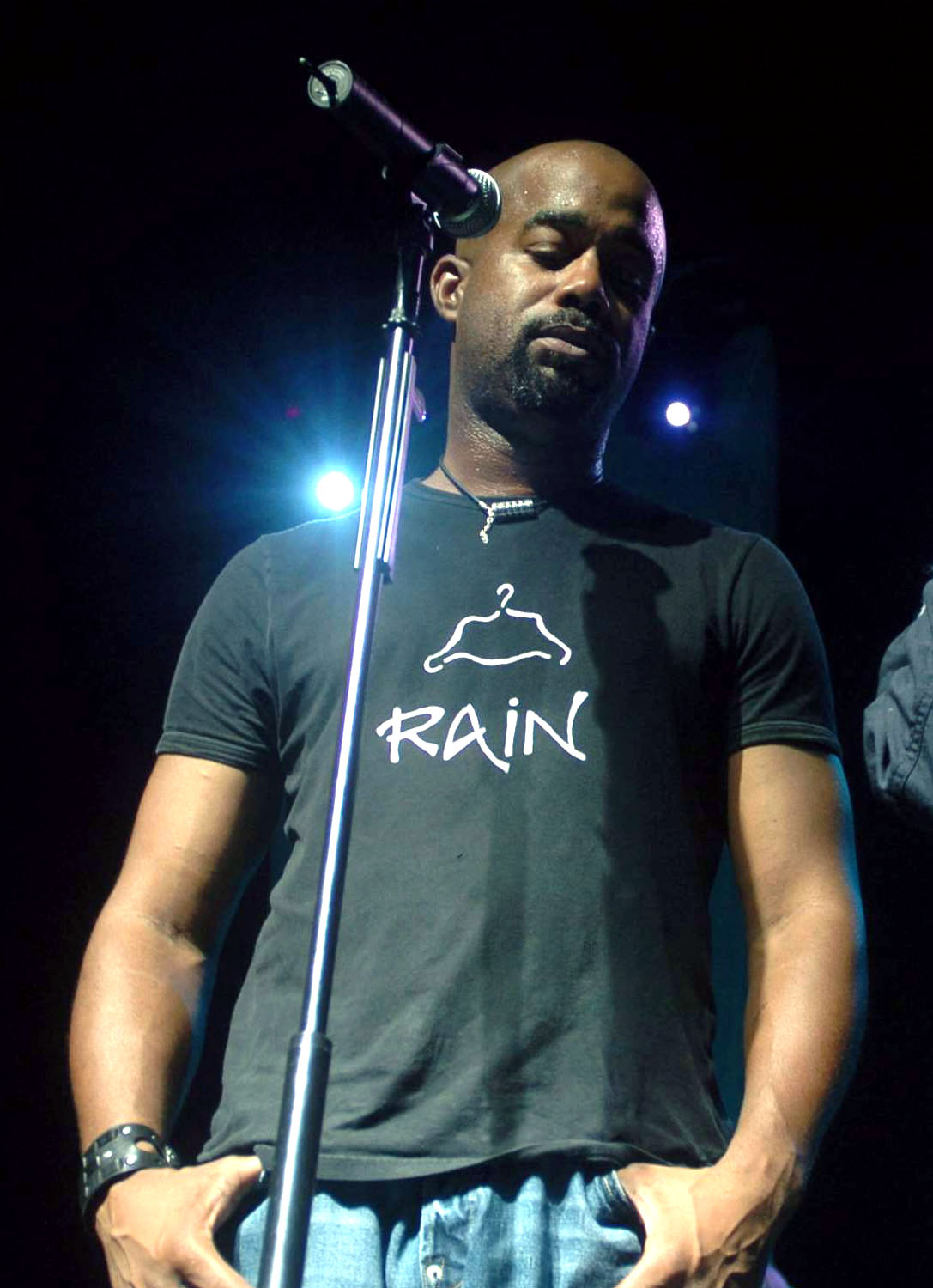
- Rucker performing at the Yokota Air Base in Japan in 2004
- Studio albums: 8
- Compilation albums: 1
- Singles: 22
- Music videos: 29
- No. 1 singles (Billboard): 10

American singer Darius Rucker gained fame as the lead singer of the roots rock band Hootie & the Blowfish before emerging as a major country music singer in 2008. As a solo artist, his discography comprises seven studio albums, including five for Capitol Nashville. His singles since 2008 have all been released to the country music format, where he has had nine number-one singles on the Country Airplay chart: "Don't Think I Don't Think About It", "It Won't Be Like This for Long", "Alright", "Come Back Song", "This", "Wagon Wheel", "If I Told You", "For the First Time", and "Beers and Sunshine". He also appeared on the number one single "Forever Country".

== Studio albums ==
=== 2000s ===
Title	Album details	Peak chart positions				Sales	Certifications
Title	Album details	US Country	US	US R&B	US Heat	Sales	Certifications
Back to Then	Release date: July 30, 2002; Label: Hidden Beach	—	127	43	1		
Learn to Live	Release date: September 16, 2008; Label: Capitol Nashville	1	5	—	—	US: 1,298,000	RIAA: 3× Platinum
"—" denotes releases that did not chart

=== 2010s ===
Title	Album details	Peak chart positions					Sales	Certifications
Title	Album details	US Country	US	AUS	CAN	UK	Sales	Certifications
Charleston, SC 1966	Release date: October 12, 2010; Label: Capitol Nashville	1	2	—	12	179	US: 489,000	RIAA: Gold
True Believers	Release date: May 21, 2013; Label: Capitol Nashville	1	2	—	17	89	US: 575,400	RIAA: 2× Platinum; RMNZ: Platinum
Home for the Holidays	Release date: October 27, 2014; Label: Capitol Nashville	3	25	—	—	—	US: 220,800	
Southern Style	Release date: March 31, 2015; Label: Capitol Nashville	1	7	—	—	—	US: 199,000	
When Was the Last Time	Release date: October 20, 2017; Label: Capitol Nashville	2	8	29	42	—	US: 123,400	
"—" denotes releases that did not chart

=== 2020s ===
Title	Album details	Peak chart positions	
Title	Album details	US Country	US
Carolyn's Boy	Release date: October 6, 2023; Label: Capitol Nashville	27	153

== Compilation albums ==
Title	Album details
#1's – Volume 1	Release date: November 19, 2021; Label: Capitol Nashville

== Singles ==
=== 2000s ===
Year	Title	Peak chart positions				Certifications	Album
Year	Title	US Country Songs	US	CAN Country	CAN	Certifications	Album
2002	"Wild One"	—	—	—	—		Back to Then
2003	"Exodus"	—	—	—	—		Back to Then
2008	"Don't Think I Don't Think About It"	1	35	3	47	RIAA: 2× Platinum	Learn to Live
2008	"It Won't Be Like This for Long"	1	36	1	59	RIAA: Platinum	Learn to Live
2009	"Alright"	1	30	2	61	RIAA: 3× Platinum	Learn to Live
2009	"History in the Making"	3	61	3	73	RIAA: Gold	Learn to Live
"—" denotes releases that did not chart

=== 2010s and 2020s ===
Year	Title	Peak chart positions					Certifications	Sales	Album
Year	Title	US Country Songs	US Country Airplay	US	CAN Country	CAN	Certifications	Sales	Album
2010	"Come Back Song"	1		37	8	87	RIAA: 2× Platinum		Charleston, SC 1966
2010	"This"	1		51	4	84	RIAA: Platinum		Charleston, SC 1966
2011	"I Got Nothin'"	17		84	43	—			Charleston, SC 1966
2012	"True Believers"	24	17	— (Note: "True Believers" did not enter the Hot 100, but peaked at number eight on Bubbling Under Hot 100 chart.)	46	—			True Believers
2013	"Wagon Wheel"	1	1	15	1	23	RIAA: 11× Platinum; BPI: Platinum; MC: 3× Platinum; RMNZ: 8× Platinum	US: 3,776,000	True Believers
2013	"Radio"	14	4	65	6	82	RIAA: Gold		True Believers
2014	"Miss You"	—	48	—	—	—			True Believers
2014	"Homegrown Honey"	6	2	53	11	76	RIAA: Platinum	US: 376,000	Southern Style
2015	"Southern Style"	38	33	—	—	—			Southern Style
2016	"If I Told You"	4	1	53	23	—	RIAA: 2× Platinum	US: 359,000	When Was the Last Time
2017	"For the First Time"	7	1	58	6	—	RIAA: Platinum	US: 90,000	When Was the Last Time
2018	"Straight to Hell" (featuring Jason Aldean, Luke Bryan, and Charles Kelley)	—	40	—	—	—	RIAA: Gold		When Was the Last Time
2020	"Beers and Sunshine"	7	1	42	2	46	RIAA: Platinum; MC: Platinum		Carolyn's Boy
2021	"My Masterpiece"	—	41	—	—	—			Non-album single
2023	"Fires Don't Start Themselves"	—	25	—	—	—			Carolyn's Boy
2024	"Never Been Over" (with Jennifer Nettles)	—	—	—	—	—			TBA
"—" denotes releases that did not chart

=== As featured artist ===
Year	Single	Peak chart positions							Certifications	Album
Year	Single	US Country Songs	US Country Airplay	US	CAN Country	CAN	AUS	SCO	Certifications	Album
2016	"Forever Country" (as part of Artists of Then, Now & Forever)	1	33	21	39	25	26	29	RIAA: Gold	Non-album single
2016	"Karaoke Song" (Sister Hazel featuring Darius Rucker)	—	—	—	—	—	—	—		Lighter in the Dark
2020	"Wrong Side of Love" (Young Bombs featuring Darius Rucker)	—	—	—	—	—	—	—		The Young Bombs Show
2023	"To Be a Man" (Dax featuring Darius Rucker)	32	—	— (Note: "To Be a Man" did not enter the Hot 100, but peaked at number 12 on the Bubbling Under Hot 100 chart.)	53	—	—	—		What Is Life?
"—" denotes releases that did not chart

== Other charted songs and promotional singles ==
Year	Title	Peak chart positions				Album
Year	Title	US Country Songs	US Country Airplay	US	US AC	Album
2009	"Winter Wonderland"	49		—	—	Country for Christmas
2009	"Candy Cane Christmas"	32		—	16	Now That's What I Call Christmas! 4
2011	"Together, Anything's Possible"	—	—	— (Note: "Together, Anything's Possible" did not enter the Hot 100, but peaked at number 2 on Bubbling Under Hot 100 chart.)	—	Non-album song
2014	"My Place" (with Big Smo)	49	—	—	—	Kuntry Livin'
2014	"Baby, It's Cold Outside" (featuring Sheryl Crow)	—	—	—	13	Home for the Holidays
2015	"What God Wants for Christmas"	—	46	—	—	Home for the Holidays
2015	"I'll Be Home for Christmas"	—	59	—	—	Home for the Holidays
2017	"Don't"	39	—	—	—	When Was the Last Time
2022	"Same Beer Different Problems"	—	—	—	—	Carolyn's Boy
2022	"Ol' Church Hymn" (featuring Chapel Hart)	—	—	—	—	Carolyn's Boy
"—" denotes releases that did not chart

== Other appearances ==
Year	Song	Artist	Album
1995	"Solitude"	Edwin McCain	Honor Among Thieves (Edwin McCain album)
1999	"Love at the Five and Dime"	Nanci Griffith	The Dust Bowl Symphony
2020	"Why Things Happen"	Jimmie Allen featuring Charley Pride	Bettie James

== Music videos ==
Year	Video	Director
2002	"Exodus"	Mark Engal
2003	"Wild One"	Miles/Future
2008	"Don't Think I Don't Think About It"	Wayne Isham
2008	"Winter Wonderland"	Wayne Isham
2009	"It Won't Be Like This for Long"	Wayne Isham
2009	"Alright"	Wayne Isham
2009	"History in the Making"	Shane Drake
2010	"Come Back Song"	Trey Fanjoy
2011	"This"	Trey Fanjoy
2011	"Together, Anything Is Possible"	John Learning
2011	"I Got Nothin'"	Shaun Silva
2012	"True Believers"	Jim Wright
2013	"Wagon Wheel"	Jim Wright
2014	"Homegrown Honey"	Jim Wright
2014	"What God Wants for Christmas"	Jim Wright
2014	"My Place" (with Big Smo)	Richard Murray
2015	"Homegrown Honey" (acoustic)	Kenny Jackson
2015	"Southern Style" (acoustic)	Kenny Jackson
2015	"Alright" (acoustic)	Kenny Jackson
2015	"So I Sang" (acoustic)	Kenny Jackson
2015	"Southern Style"	Peter Zavadil
2016	"Forever Country" (Artists of Then, Now & Forever)	Joseph Kahn
2016	"If I Told You"	Jim Wright
2016	"Love to Hate It"	Martin Kahan
2016	"Life on the Line" (With Fiona Culley)	Wiley Chandler
2017	"For the First Time"	Jim Wright
2018	"Straight to Hell" (with Charles Kelley, Luke Bryan & Jason Aldean)	TK McKamy
2020	"Beers and Sunshine"	Aaron Eisenberg
2021	"My Masterpiece"	Jim Wright

== See also ==
- Hootie & the Blowfish discography
