= Southern Style Tour =

2015 concert tour by Darius Rucker

- Tour by Darius Rucker
- Tour poster
- Associated album: Southern Style
- Start date: May 14, 2015
- End date: November 20, 2015
- Legs: 2
- No. of shows: 47
- Box office: $14 million

Darius Rucker concert chronology
- True Believers Tour (2014); Southern Style Tour (2015); Good for a Good Time Tour (2016)

The Southern Style Tour was a headlining concert tour by American singer Darius Rucker, it supported his fifth studio album Southern Style (2015). It began on May 14, 2015, in Holmdel, New Jersey and finished on November 20, 2015, in Toledo, Ohio. The tour placed eighty-second on Pollstar's Year End Top 200 North American Tours of 2015, and grossed $14 million.

== Background ==
In January 2015, while appearing on The Tonight Show Starring Jimmy Fallon, Rucker announced the tour and his new album. The tour will be a part of Live Nation's Country Megaticket. Supporting Rucker on the first leg is, Brett Eldredge, Brothers Osborne, A Thousand Horses, and Cassadee Pope. The second leg was announced in July 2015, A Thousand Horses will continue to open up for Rucker with the addition of David Nail.

== Setlist ==
North America Leg 1

1. "Lighter Up"
2. "This"
3. "Good for a Good Time"
4. "Radio"
5. "Southern Style"
6. "Time" (Hootie & the Blowfish song)
7. "All I Want"
8. "Don't Think I Don't Think About It"
9. "Back When"
10. "No Diggity" (Blackstreet, Dr. Dre & Queen Pen cover)
11. "It Won't Be Like This for Long"
12. "History in the Making"
13. "Alright"
14. "Only Wanna Be With You" (Hootie & the Blowfish song; performed with Brett Eldredge, Brothers Osborne & A Thousand Horses)
15. "East Bound and Down" (Jerry Reed cover)
16. "Let Her Cry" (Hootie & the Blowfish song)
17. "Come Back Song"
18. "Hold My Hand" (Hootie & the Blowfish song)
19. "Homegrown Honey"

Encore

20. "So I Sang"
21. "Wagon Wheel" (Old Crow Medicine Show cover)

== Tour dates ==
Date	City	Country	Venue	Opening acts	Attendance	Revenue
North America leg 1
May 14, 2015	Holmdel	United States	PNC Bank Arts Center	Brett Eldredge; Brothers Osborne; A Thousand Horses	15,397 / 16,890	$481,572
May 15, 2015	Burgettstown	United States	First Niagara Pavilion	Brett Eldredge; Brothers Osborne; A Thousand Horses	7,561 / 23,043	$192,725
May 21, 2015	Alpharetta	United States	Verizon Wireless Amphitheatre	Brett Eldredge; Brothers Osborne; A Thousand Horses	7,818 / 12,363	$342,721
May 22, 2015	Tampa	United States	MidFlorida Credit Union Amphitheatre	Brett Eldredge; Brothers Osborne; A Thousand Horses	11,269 / 19,289	$255,179
May 23, 2015	West Palm Beach	United States	Coral Sky Amphitheatre	Brett Eldredge; Brothers Osborne; A Thousand Horses	11,315 / 19,267	$242,215
May 29, 2015^{[A]}	Scranton	United States	The Pavilion at Montage Mountain	Brett Eldredge; Brothers Osborne; A Thousand Horses	9,987 / 17,476	$219,737
May 30, 2015 ^{[B]}	Camden	United States	Susquehanna Bank Center	Brett Eldredge; Brothers Osborne; A Thousand Horses; Drake White; Kelsea Ballerini	25,000 / 25,000	—N/a
June 5, 2015^{[C]}	Detroit	United States	West Riverfront Park	Brett Eldredge; Brothers Osborne; A Thousand Horses; Craig Wayne Boyd	—N/a	—N/a
June 6, 2015	Toronto	Canada	Molson Amphitheatre	Brett Eldredge; Brothers Osborne; A Thousand Horses	8,848 / 16,052	$317,053
June 18, 2015	Cedar Park	United States	Cedar Park Center	Brett Eldredge; Brothers Osborne; A Thousand Horses	3,080 / 6,772	$157,489
June 19, 2015	Dallas	United States	Gexa Energy Pavilion	Brett Eldredge; Brothers Osborne; A Thousand Horses	10,535 / 20,002	$252,007
June 20, 2015	The Woodlands	United States	Cynthia Woods Mitchell Pavilion	Brett Eldredge; Brothers Osborne; A Thousand Horses	6,384 / 16,087	$176,092
June 26, 2015	Maryland Heights	United States	Hollywood Casino Amphitheatre	Brett Eldredge; Brothers Osborne; A Thousand Horses	10,713 / 20,000	$238,650
June 27, 2015	Noblesville	United States	Klipsch Music Center	Brett Eldredge; Brothers Osborne; A Thousand Horses	13,910 / 24,695	$333,347
June 28, 2015	Cincinnati	United States	Riverbend Music Center	Brett Eldredge; Brothers Osborne; A Thousand Horses	9,848 / 20,402	$292,239
July 2, 2015	Simpsonville	United States	Charter Spectrum Amphitheatre	Colt Ford; Outshyne	6,145 / 11,117	$201,582
July 10, 2015	Gilford	United States	Bank of New Hampshire Pavilion	Brett Eldredge; Brothers Osborne; A Thousand Horses	6,878 / 7,585	$310,883
July 11, 2015	Mansfield	United States	Xfinity Center	Brett Eldredge; Brothers Osborne; A Thousand Horses	19,266 / 19,910	$562,873
July 12, 2015	Wantagh	United States	Nikon at Jones Beach Theater	Brett Eldredge; Brothers Osborne; A Thousand Horses	13,635 / 14,003	$548,345
July 16, 2015	West Valley City	United States	USANA Amphitheatre	Brett Eldredge; Brothers Osborne; A Thousand Horses	6,549 / 20,000	$210,018
July 17, 2015	Englewood	United States	Fiddler's Green Amphitheatre	Brett Eldredge; Brothers Osborne; A Thousand Horses	12,132 / 17,216	$376,087
July 18, 2015	Albuquerque	United States	Isleta Amphitheater	Brett Eldredge; Brothers Osborne; A Thousand Horses	9,120 / 15,387	$223,727
July 31, 2015	Mountain View	United States	Shoreline Amphitheatre	Brett Eldredge; Brothers Osborne; A Thousand Horses	13,431 / 22,000	$334,032
August 1, 2015	Irvine	United States	Verizon Wireless Amphitheatre	Brett Eldredge; Brothers Osborne; A Thousand Horses	14,152 / 15,000	$419,233
August 2, 2015	Chula Vista	United States	Sleep Train Amphitheatre	Brett Eldredge; Brothers Osborne; A Thousand Horses	8,495 / 19,595	$234,075
August 14, 2015^{[D]}	Bethlehem	United States	Musikfest	David Nail; Cassadee Pope	—N/a	—N/a
August 15, 2015	Atlantic City	United States	Festival Park at The Borgata	David Nail; Cassadee Pope	—N/a	—N/a
August 21, 2015	Darien Center	United States	Darien Lake PAC	Brett Eldredge; Brothers Osborne; A Thousand Horses	9,579 / 21,800	$305,699
August 22, 2015	Columbia	United States	Merriweather Post Pavilion	Brett Eldredge; Brothers Osborne; A Thousand Horses	10,767 / 15,000	$585,335
August 23, 2015	Cuyahoga Falls	United States	Blossom Music Center	Brett Eldredge; Brothers Osborne; A Thousand Horses	13,876 / 20,390	$372,588
August 28, 2015	Raleigh	United States	Walnut Creek Amphitheatre	Brett Eldredge; Brothers Osborne; A Thousand Horses	17,300 / 19,980	$380,339
August 29, 2015	Charlotte	United States	PNC Music Pavilion	Brett Eldredge; Brothers Osborne; A Thousand Horses	14,884 / 18,958	$381,313
August 30, 2015	Virginia Beach	United States	Farm Bureau Live	Brett Eldredge; Brothers Osborne; A Thousand Horses	10,338 / 19,995	$244,895
North America leg 2
October 8, 2015	Rosemont	United States	Allstate Arena	David Nail; A Thousand Horses	—N/a	—N/a
October 9, 2015	Fairborn	United States	Nutter Center	David Nail; A Thousand Horses	—N/a	—N/a
October 10, 2015	Youngstown	United States	Covelli Centre	David Nail; A Thousand Horses	—N/a	—N/a
October 15, 2015	Topeka	United States	Kansas Expo Center	David Nail; A Thousand Horses	—N/a	—N/a
October 16, 2015	Lincoln	United States	Pinnacle Bank Arena	David Nail; A Thousand Horses	—N/a	—N/a
October 17, 2015	Sioux City	United States	Tyson Events Center	David Nail; A Thousand Horses	—N/a	—N/a
October 22, 2015	Syracuse	United States	Oncenter War Memorial Arena	David Nail; Cam	—N/a	—N/a
October 23, 2015	Albany	United States	Times Union Center	David Nail; Cam	5,123 / 9,894	$162,321
October 24, 2015	Uncasville	United States	Mohegan Sun Arena	David Nail; Cam	—N/a	—N/a
November 12, 2015	Bemidji	United States	Sanford Center	David Nail; A Thousand Horses	—N/a	—N/a
November 13, 2015	Green Bay	United States	Resch Center	David Nail; A Thousand Horses	—N/a	—N/a
November 14, 2015	Moline	United States	iWireless Center	David Nail; A Thousand Horses	—N/a	—N/a
November 19, 2015	Grand Rapids	United States	Van Andel Arena	David Nail; A Thousand Horses	5,747 / 8,502	$229,432
November 20, 2015	Toledo	United States	Huntington Center	David Nail; A Thousand Horses	5,694 / 6,976	$226,420
Total						

Festivals and other miscellaneous performances
^{A} This concert is a part of Froggy Fest 2015
^{B} This concert is a part of 92.5 WXTU's 31st Anniversary Show
^{C} This concert is a part of 99.5 WYCD's Downtown Hoedown
^{D} This concert is a part of Musikfest
