= History in the Making =

History in the Making may refer to:

- "History in the Making" (song), a song by American country music singer Darius Rucker
- History in the Making (Big Gemini album), 2008
- History in the Making (J.R. Writer album), 2006
- Myth: History in the Making, 1989
