= I Got Nothin' =

Single by Darius Rucker

from the album Charleston, SC 1966
- Released: May 23, 2011
- Genre: Country
- Length: 3:24
- Label: Capitol Nashville
- Songwriters: Darius Rucker; Clay Mills
- Producer: Frank Rogers

Darius Rucker singles chronology
| "This" (2010) | "I Got Nothin'" (2011) | "True Believers" (2012) |

"I Got Nothin'" is a song recorded by American country music artist Darius Rucker and co-written by Rucker with Clay Mills. It was released in May 2011 as the seventh solo single of Rucker's career, and the third single from his album Charleston, SC 1966.

== Content ==
In the song, the male narrator is facing the end of a marriage. The title has two meanings. First, he wants to say something to his wife to reconcile, but he can't think of anything; he has "got nothin'". Then, at the end of the song, he reflects that once she leaves, he has "got nothin'".

== Music video ==
Shaun Silva directed the song's music video.

== Critical reception ==
An uncredited review in HitFix described the song favorably, saying that it showed Rucker's "penchant for capturing details about every day life in a real, truthful way that makes you nod your head and say, 'I’ve been there.'" Website Taste of Country gave it a 9 out of 10 rating, praising Rucker's vocals and the twist in the song's bridge. Michael McCall of the Associated Press was less positive, saying that both it and "Come Back Song" "feature powerful performances that hardly vary in delivery and reveal little depth of feeling, despite dealing with serious topics." Kevin John Coyne, reviewing the song for Country Universe, gave it a C rating, saying that Rucker has potential, but he is not using it in this song.

== Chart performance ==
"I Got Nothin'" debuted at number 54 on the Hot Country Songs chart dated June 4, 2011. It also debuted at number 84 on the U.S. Billboard Hot 100 chart for the week of October 1, 2011. It reached a peak of number 17 in November 2011.

| Chart (2011) | Peak position |
|---|---|
| Canada Country (Billboard) | 43 |
| US Billboard Hot 100 | 84 |
| US Hot Country Songs (Billboard) | 17 |

=== Year-end charts ===
| Chart (2011) | Position |
|---|---|
| US Country Songs (Billboard) | 58 |
