= Learn to Live =

Studio album by Darius Rucker
- Released: September 16, 2008
- Genre: Country
- Length: 43:28
- Label: Capitol Nashville
- Producer: Frank Rogers

Darius Rucker chronology
Back to Then (2002)	Learn to Live (2008)	Charleston, SC 1966 (2010)

Singles from Learn to Live
- 1. "Don't Think I Don't Think About It" Released: May 27, 2008; 2. "It Won't Be Like This for Long" Released: November 3, 2008; 3. "Alright" Released: April 20, 2009; 4. "History in the Making" Released: September 8, 2009

Professional ratings
Aggregate scores
Source	Rating
Metacritic	(66/100)
Review scores
Source	Rating
Allmusic	3/5 stars
Billboard	(favorable)
The Boston Globe	(positive)
Entertainment Weekly	B−
The New York Times	(favorable)
PopMatters	5/10 stars
Robert Christgau	(3-star Honorable Mention)
Slant Magazine	3/5 stars

Learn to Live is the second studio album and country debut by American country music artist Darius Rucker. The album was released September 16, 2008 on Capitol Nashville Records and produced by Frank Rogers. Learn to Live was Rucker's first studio album marketed towards country music, and is also his first release since the 2002 R&B release of Back to Then. The album spawned three number one singles on the Billboard country music chart: "Don't Think I Don't Think About It," "It Won't Be Like This for Long," and "Alright." Learn to Live is Rucker's best-selling solo album to date and is his first solo album to go Platinum.

== Background ==
Learn to Live was recorded both in Franklin, Tennessee, and Nashville, Tennessee. Brady Vercher of Engine 145 praised the album's overall production and sound, finding nearly every track to, "sound as if it were crafted to be a potential single, with solid hooks and melodies aplenty, but at times the phrasing is more focused on selling those aspects at the expense of emotion." Slant Magazine's Johnathan Keefe praised the album's production, saying that the record makes, "a concerted effort to sound like a modern country album." He also gave credit to the album's producer, Frank Rogers (who had previously produced Brad Paisley's albums), who had co-written most of the album's twelve tracks.

Many of the tracks are a variety of country music styles. The second track, "All I Want" is set in a two-step shuffle, while "Drinkin' and Dialin'" is a "clever barroom crawl," according to Allmusic. "All I Want" features guitar played by Brad Paisley and its fifth track, "If I Had Wings," features harmony vocals from country artists Vince Gill and Alison Krauss.

== Critical reception ==
Learn to Live received a score of 66 out of 100 from Metacritic based on "generally favorable reviews". Blake Boldt of PopMatters gave the album overall solid review, praising the single, "Don't Think I Don't Think About It," by calling Rucker's delivery, "honest and heartfelt." Boldt was also pleased with the fact that Rucker attracted, "the attention of the country radio audience with that single, and it’s helped boost the profile of his first full country album, Learn to Live, a release that owns a variety of country music’s common topics and musical techniques." Boldt concluded his review by saying, "Learn to Live is well-produced and well-sung, but too many of the songs fail to fit the artist behind them." Sarah Rodman of The Boston Globe also praised Learn to Live, calling the single, "Alright," an "essential" track. Rodman later stated, "If you're going to be tooling down the middle of the road, "Learn to Live" is perfectly pleasant accompaniment."

Learn to Live was also reviewed by Stephen Thomas Erlewine of Allmusic, who gave the release three out of five stars. Like PopMatters, Erlewine was pleased that Rucker chose to make a "leap" into country music. Erlewine frequently compared the album to Hootie & the Blowfish's Cracked Rear View, saying that the material was, "written with Rucker in mind, not a jam band, they're more pop in form and feel than anything he's done since." Erlewine then stated, "...these songs aren't knockouts, but they're friendly and comfortable, the kind of sturdy roots-pop that seems like it'd be easy to pull off but must not be, as this delicate balance of conversational melody and guy-next-door appeal has proven elusive to Rucker for over a decade now." The New York Times favored the album as well. Critic, Jon Caramanica found Rucker to be "well-suited" to country music and called the tracks, "impressively eclectic and sharply written." He compared "Alright" to that of the recent hits by country singer, Craig Morgan, and then concluded by saying, "Such missteps [the song "If I Had Wings"] are few, though, and “Learn to Live” is seamless enough that it almost slips by unnoticed that Mr. Rucker is the first African-American to have a Top 10 country hit (the muscular “Don’t Think I Don’t Think About It”) since Charley Pride."

== Commercial performance ==
The album's lead single, "Don't Think I Don't Think About It" was released May 27, 2008. The song became Rucker's first number one single by September 2008, becoming the first African-American country artist to have a major hit since Charley Pride in the 1980s. Learn to Live debuted at #1 on the Billboard Country Albums chart and at #5 on the overall Billboard 200, selling 60,000 copies in its first week. As of February 2010, the album has sold 1,298,274 copies in the United States, according to Nielsen SoundScan, and has now been certified three-times Platinum by the Recording Industry Association of America, for shipments to retailers of three million copies. After releasing the album's second single in late 2008 entitled, "It Won't Be Like This for Long," the song became his second number one single on the Billboard Hot Country Songs chart. The album's seventh track entitled, "Alright," was released as a single shortly afterward. The song became Rucker's third number one single on the Billboard country chart, spending two weeks at #1 in early August. On September 8, 2009, the album's fourth and final single, "History in the Making," was released, debuting at #51 on the Billboard country chart, and went on to be an additional Top Five hit.

== Track listing ==
No.	Title	Writer(s)	Length
1.	"Forever Road"	Darius Rucker, Frank Rogers, Chris Stapleton	4:01
2.	"All I Want"	Rucker, Rogers	3:49
3.	"Don't Think I Don't Think About It"	Rucker, Clay Mills	3:03
4.	"Learn to Live"	Rucker, Rogers	3:48
5.	"If I Had Wings"	Rucker, Rogers, Rivers Rutherford	4:03
6.	"History in the Making"	Rucker, Mills, Rogers	3:29
7.	"Alright"	Rucker, Rogers	3:51
8.	"It Won't Be Like This for Long"	Rucker, Chris DuBois, Ashley Gorley	3:39
9.	"Drinkin' and Dialin'"	Rucker, DuBois, Gorley	3:04
10.	"I Hope They Get to Me in Time"	Monty Criswell, Wade Kirby	3:26
11.	"While I Still Got the Time"	Rogers, Rucker, Rutherford	3:49
12.	"Be Wary of a Woman"	Rucker, Dave Berg, Patrick Davis	3:26

iTunes Bonus Track
No.	Title	Length
13.	"I Want to Thank You"	3:57

== Personnel ==
- David Angell – violin (track 5)
- Manisa Angell – viola (track 5)
- Ron Block – banjo (track 4)
- Mike Brignardello – bass guitar (tracks 1, 6, 7, 10)
- Jim "Moose" Brown – piano (track 8), Wurlitzer (track 8)
- Pat Buchanan – electric guitar (tracks 2–4, 7, 11, 12), baritone guitar (track 9), mandolin (track 9)
- Bradley Clark – group vocals (track 11)
- J. T. Corenflos – electric guitar (tracks 1, 3, 6–8, 10, 12)
- Eric Darken – percussion
- David Davidson – violin (track 5)
- Dan Dugmore – steel guitar (tracks 1–4, 6, 7, 9–12), Dobro (track 5)
- Shannon Forrest – drums (tracks 1, 3, 6–8, 10, 12)
- Melissa Fuller – group vocals (track 11)
- Vince Gill – background vocals (track 5)
- Aubrey Haynie – fiddle (tracks 1–6, 8–12), mandolin (tracks 5, 7, 11)
- Wes Hightower – background vocals (tracks 1–4, 6–12)
- John Hobbs – conductor and string arrangements (track 5)
- Ann Inman – group vocals (track 11)
- Mike Johnson – steel guitar (track 8)
- Alison Krauss – background vocals (track 5)
- Anthony LaMarchina – cello (track 5)
- B. James Lowry – acoustic guitar (tracks 2, 4, 5, 9, 11), resonator guitar (track 11)
- Brent Mason – electric guitar (tracks 4, 5, 9, 11), baritone guitar (track 4)
- Greg Morrow – drums (tracks 2, 4, 5, 9, 11)
- Gordon Mote – piano (tracks 1–7, 9–12), Hammond organ (track 5, 11, 12)
- Brad Paisley – electric guitar (track 2)
- Frank Randazzo – group vocals (track 11)
- Michael Rhodes – bass guitar (tracks 2–5, 8, 9, 11, 12)
- Sarah Ross – group vocals (track 11)
- Darius Rucker – lead vocals
- Pamela Sixfin – violin (track 5)
- Phillip Stein – group vocals (track 11)
- Bryan Sutton – acoustic guitar (tracks 1, 3, 6, 7, 10, 12), banjo (track 1, 7, 12), mandolin (track 1)
- Ilya Toshinsky – acoustic guitar (track 8), mandolin (track 8)
- Mary Kathryn Vanosdale – violin (track 5)
- Waylon Weatherholt – group vocals (track 11)
- Kristin Wilkinson – viola (track 5), string arrangements (track 5)

== Charts ==
=== Weekly charts ===
Chart (2008)	Peak position
US Billboard 200	5
US Top Country Albums (Billboard)	1

=== Year-end charts ===
Chart (2008)	Position
US Billboard 200	198
US Top Country Albums (Billboard)	34
Chart (2009)	Position
US Billboard 200	27
US Top Country Albums (Billboard)	7
Chart (2010)	Position
US Billboard 200	56
US Top Country Albums (Billboard)	13

== Certifications ==
Certifications for Learn To Live
Region	Certification	Certified units/sales
United States (RIAA)	3× Platinum	3,000,000^{‡}
^{‡} Sales+streaming figures based on certification alone.
