= Charleston, SC 1966 =

Studio album by Darius Rucker
- Released: October 12, 2010
- Genre: Country
- Length: 48:31
- Label: Capitol Nashville
- Producer: Frank Rogers

Darius Rucker chronology
Learn to Live (2008)	Charleston, SC 1966 (2010)	True Believers (2013)

Singles from Charleston, SC 1966
- 1. "Come Back Song" Released: July 6, 2010; 2. "This" Released: November 22, 2010; 3. "I Got Nothin'" Released: May 23, 2011

Charleston, SC 1966 is the third studio album and the second country album from American recording artist Darius Rucker. It was released in the United States on October 12, 2010, through Capitol Nashville.

== Background ==
In a CMT news-post, it was explained that the album title is derived from country music artist Radney Foster's 1992 album, Del Rio, TX 1959, which noted Foster's birthplace and birth year, as the title for this album had been for the birth year and birthplace of Rucker. Rucker said Foster's album "showed him the possibilities of country music".

== Critical reception ==
Professional ratings
Review scores
Source	Rating
Allmusic	3/5 stars
American Songwriter	3.5/5 stars
Country Weekly	4/5 stars
The Dallas Morning News	B
Entertainment Weekly	B+
Los Angeles Times	2/4 stars
Rolling Stone	3/5 stars
Roughstock	4/5 stars
Slant Magazine	2.5/5 stars
USA Today	3/4 stars

Upon its release, Charleston, SC 1966 received generally positive reviews from most music critics. At Metacritic, which assigns a normalized rating out of 100 to reviews from mainstream critics, the album received an average score of 68, based on 10 reviews, which indicates "generally favorable reviews".

Jessica Phillips with Country Weekly compared it to his previous album Learn to Live, saying "[Rucker] created a successful blend of touching love ballads and positive up-tempo meditations on life with his 2008 foray into country music, Learn to Live, and he reprises that winning mix for his sophomore country solo release", and gave it four out of five stars. Matt Bjorke with Roughstock gave it a four star rating, called all of the tracks on the record "radio ready" and said "Charleston, SC 1966 may not feature many outright old school traditional tunes like Learn to Live featured but in many ways the album features quite a few songs that show off a more 'traditional' feel than most mainstream country albums do nowadays and to be perfectly honest, it’s a sound and feel that suits Darius Rucker like a glove. Sarah Rodman with The Boston Globe favored the album over its predecessor saying it "surpasses its predecessor on the strength of more vibrant and charming tunes." Brian Mansfield with USA Today called it a "fine-sounding country album" and said that with the release, "he seems to have made his primary home in country music".

Mario Tarradell with The Dallas Morning News gave it a "B" rating, calling it a "solid follow-up" to Learn to Live, and said that he "ably captures the nuances of mainstream country". Stephen Thomas Erlewine with Allmusic called it "a gleaming example of polished, pressed, modern country-pop" and gave it a three star rating. Rick Moore with American Songwriter gave it three and a half stars, saying "Charleston, SC 1966 doesn’t break any rules or new ground, and probably wasn’t meant to [...] it’s obviously calculated to appeal to the million people who bought Learn to Live, so if you’re one of them, you’ll probably like this record."

Michael McCall with the Associated Press called the tracks on the release "too radio friendly" and said that "his new focus loses the creative sweep and emotional force that made his first country album so compelling. Jonathan Keefe with Slant Magazine gave it a two and a half star rating, calling the material "banal".

== Commercial performance ==
The album debuted at number two on the U.S. Billboard 200, and at number one on the Top Country albums chart selling 101,000 copies in its first week of release. In its second week of release, the album dropped to number ten on the Billboard 200, selling 37,000 copies. In its third week of release, the album jumped to number nine on the Billboard 200 selling 27,000 copies. As of the chart dated July 23, 2011, the album has sold 489,681 copies in the US.

== Track listing ==
No.	Title	Writer(s)	Length
1.	"This"	Darius Rucker; Frank Rogers; Kara DioGuardi	3:38
2.	"Come Back Song"	Rucker; Chris Stapleton; Casey Beathard	3:55
3.	"Might Get Lucky"	Rucker; Radney Foster; Jay Clementi	3:45
4.	"Whiskey and You"	Rucker; Rogers	4:15
5.	"Southern State of Mind"	Rucker; Ashley Gorley; Chris DuBois	3:36
6.	"Love Will Do That"	Rucker; Rogers; Don Sampson	3:24
7.	"The Craziest Thing"	Rucker; Rogers; Monty Criswell	3:15
8.	"Things I'd Never Do"	Rucker; Rogers; Clay Mills	3:47
9.	"We All Fall Down"	Rucker; Kim Tribble	3:35
10.	"I Don't Care" (featuring Brad Paisley)	Rucker; Paisley; DuBois	4:01
11.	"She's Beautiful"	Rucker; Rogers; Brett Jones	4:05
12.	"I Got Nothin'"	Rucker; Mills	3:24
13.	"In a Big Way"	Rucker; Beathard	3:52

iTunes Deluxe Edition
No.	Title	Writer(s)	Length
14.	"Let Her Cry" (from CMT Invitation Only)	Rucker; Dean Felber; Jim Sonefeld; Mark Bryan	4:44
15.	"Family Tradition" (from CMT Invitation Only)	Hank Williams, Jr.	4:15

== Personnel ==
Musicians

- Mike Brignardello – Bass guitar (track 10)
- Pat Buchanan – Electric guitar (all tracks except 6 & 10), Slide Guitar (track 2)
- Sam Bush – Mandolin (track 6)
- J. T. Corenflos – Baritone Guitar (track 8), Electric guitar (all tracks), Slide Guitar (track 2)
- John Cowan – Background Vocals (track 6)
- Eric Darken – Percussion (all tracks except 6)
- Dan Dugmore – Steel Guitar (all tracks)
- Béla Fleck – Banjo (track 6)
- Shannon Forrest – Drums (all tracks)
- Aubrey Haynie – Fiddle (tracks 1, 3, 4, 7–13), Mandolin (tracks 5, 12, 13)
- Wes Hightower – Background Vocals (all tracks except 6)
- Gordon Mote – B-3 organ (tracks 4, 7), Keyboards (track 4), piano (all tracks except 2 & 3), Wurlitzer (tracks 2, 3)
- Brad Paisley – Acoustic Guitar (track 10), Electric guitar (track 10), Duet Vocals (track 10)
- Michael Rhodes – Bass guitar (all tracks except 9 & 10), Fretless Bass (track 9)
- Darius Rucker – Lead Vocals (all tracks)
- Bryan Sutton – Banjo (tracks 5, 7), Acoustic Guitar (all tracks except 10), Mandolin (track 1)
- Ilya Toshinsky – Banjo (tracks 1, 11), Bouzouki (track 7), Mandolin (track 2), National Steel Guitar (track 6)
- Chad Weaver – C-Bender Guitar (track 10)

Production

- Brady Barnett – Digital Editing
- Richard Barrow – Engineer, Overdub Engineer
- Steve Beers – Assistant Engineer
- Drew Bollman – Mixing Assistant
- Neal Cappellino – Overdub Engineer
- Joanna Carter – Art Direction
- Michelle Hall – Producer
- Gina Ketchum – Make-Up, Wardrobe
- Tyler Moles – Digital Editing
- Seth Morton – Mixing Assistant
- John Netti – Assistant Engineer
- Justin Niebank – Mixing
- Rich Ramsey – Assistant Engineer
- Frank Rogers – Producer
- Wendy Stamberger – Design
- Phillip Stein – Digital Editing, Production Assistant
- Hank Williams – Mastering
- Brian David Willis – Digital Editing
- Jim Wright – Photography

== Charts ==
=== Weekly charts ===
Chart (2010–2011)	Peak position
Canadian Albums (Billboard)	12
UK Country Albums (Official Charts)	1
US Billboard 200	2
US Top Country Albums (Billboard)	1

=== Year-end charts ===
Chart (2010)	Position
US Billboard 200	160
US Top Country Albums (Billboard)	32
Chart (2011)	Position
US Billboard 200	101
US Top Country Albums (Billboard)	21

=== Singles ===
Year	Single	Peak chart positions		
Year	Single	US Country	US	CAN
2010	"Come Back Song"	1	37	87
2010	"This"	1	51	84
2011	"I Got Nothin'"	17	84	—
"—" denotes releases that did not chart

== Certifications ==
Region	Certification	Certified units/sales
United States (RIAA)	Gold	500,000^{^}
^{^} Shipments figures based on certification alone.
