= Arden Altino =

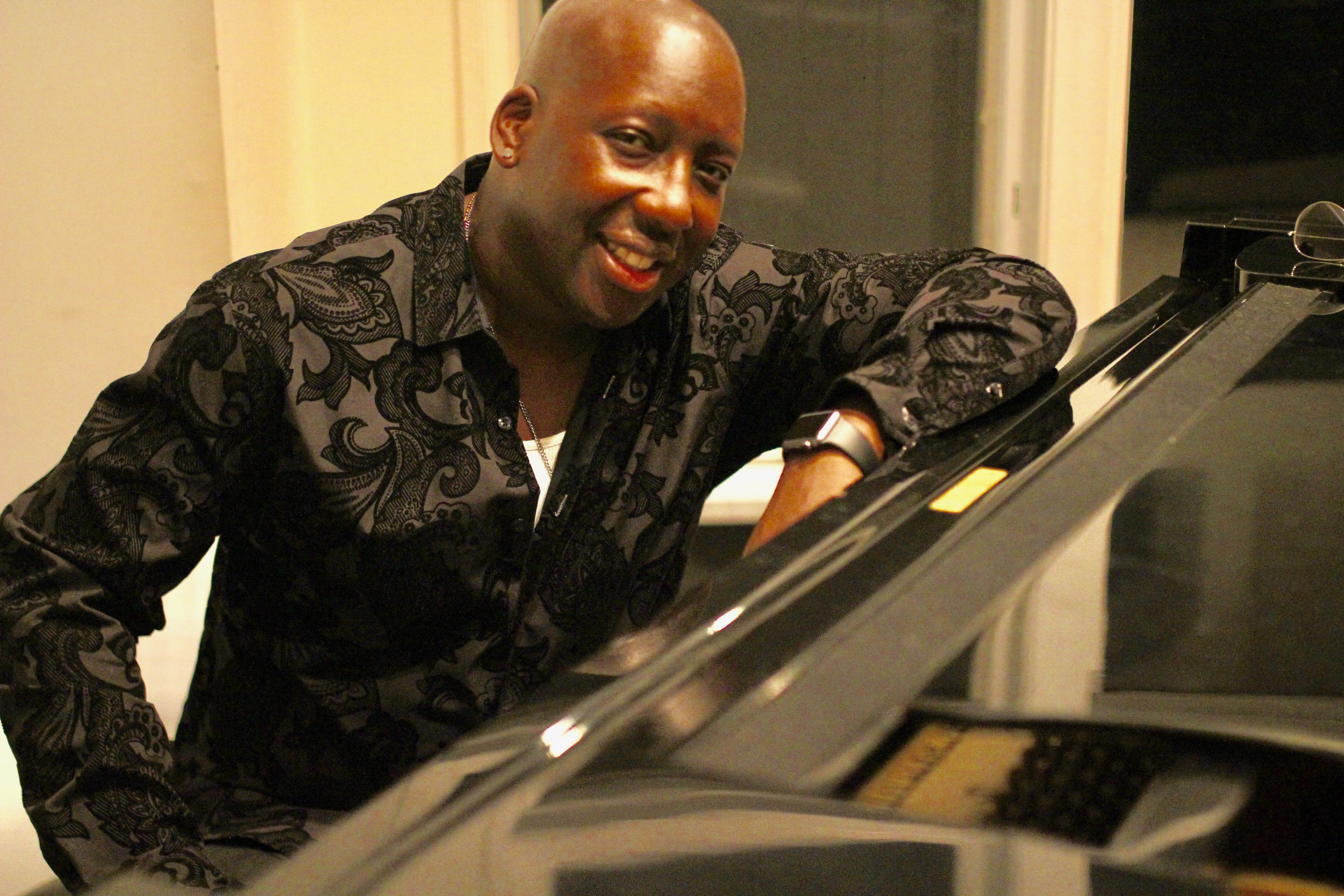

Background information
- Born: New York City, U.S.
- Genres: Hip-hop; R&B; pop; reggae; gospel
- Occupations: Record producer; pianist
- Instruments: Piano, Keyboard, Key-tar
- Label: Wonda Music

Arden Altino is an American record producer. Altino has produced songs such as "Hold On" for Darius Rucker of Hootie & the Blowfish, and "Out of My Head" for Lupe Fiasco. His other credits include Mary J. Blige, Justin Bieber, Estelle, and Diddy. Altino often co-produces with Jerry Duplessis out of Platinum Sounds Recording Studio in New York City.

== Biography ==
Born in Brooklyn and raised in Queens, New York, Arden's talent lies in his combined years of training as a pianist. His understanding of music extends to the R&B, Soul, Hip-Hop, Classical, Jazz, Latin, Kompa and Zouk genres. Altino's Haitian roots and close-knit family influenced his career path and was instrumental in developing him into the Producer/Musician that he is today. The Altino Family is not a stranger to music, his father & uncle played instruments in the church which led him to follow in their footsteps. Arden attended Fiorello Laguardia High School of the Performing Arts and Five Towns College to Study Audio Engineering.

In 1999, and for the next two years, he engineered for various artists including: Busta Rhymes, Tony Touch and Rah Digga. In 2001, he produced also several tunes for Jimmy Cozier including "Gave You Love" and the duet with Alicia Keys "Mr. Man". The multi platinum album "Songs in A Minor" went on to win a Grammy in 2001

Since 2006, Altino's career has been active within the industry. His collaborations include; Patti Labelle., DJ Rekha, Lyfe Jennings, Pharoahe Monch, Aventura, Jay Z, and Wyclef Jean. His musical ambition has led him to sign a business partnership with producer Jerry "Wonda" Duplessis. They continue to work together on various musical projects

== Discography ==
Musical Credits
Year	Song / Album	Artist	Credit(s)
2020	Mad Love	Infinity Song	Composer, Producer
2020	What We Want, Pt. 2	Ras Baraka	Composer, Keyboards, Producer
2020	Lullaby Versions of Justin Bieber	Twinkle Twinkle Little Rock Star	Composer
2020	4 All Ages: Relax & Chill Music	Various Artists	Composer
2020	Yoga Songs 2020		Composer
2019	Akonda	Akon	Composer, Producer
2019	Higher	Ally Brooke	Composer
2019	Beyond Me	Madison Ryann Ward	Composer
2017	War & Leisure	Miguel	Composer
2015	The Intimate Truth	Ledisi	Composer
2015	Fly International Luxurious Art	Raekwon	Composer
2015	Yoga To Justin Bieber	Yoga Pop Ups	Composer
2015	Soca Gold 2015	Various Artist	Keyboards
2015	A Little Bit of Me: Live in L.A.	Melissa Etheridge	Keyboards
2014	Mali Is...	Mali Music	Producer
2014	Think Like a Man Too	Mary J. Blige	Composer
2014	The Truth	Ledisi	Composer
2014	Stronger	Tank	Composer, Producer
2014	R&B Anthems	Mary J. Blige	Composer, Keyboards, Producer
2014	Last Winter	Bas	Composer
2014	JHUD	Jennifer Hudson	Composer
2014	Guilty Conscience	J. Holiday	Composer, Keyboards, Producer
2014	Best Love... Ever!, Vol. 2		Composer, Keyboards, Producer
2014	BET Presents: Music Matters, Vol. 1		Composer
2014	Anybody Wanna Buy a Heart?	K. Michelle	Composer, Keyboards, Producer
2013	Soundboy Kill It	Raekwon	Composer
2013	All About You	Raekwon	Composer
2012	...Cut To Bridget Kelly	Bridget Kelly	Composer
2012	So Blue	Akon	Composer
2012	Back to Love	Estelle	Keyboards
2012	Wonderful Life	Estelle	Composer
2012	Thank You	Estelle	Composer
2012	All of Me	Estelle	Composer, Keyboards, Piano, Producer
2012	Think Like a Man [Music from and Inspired by the Film]	Various Artists	Composer, Producer
2012	Smooth Jazz Tribute to Anthony Hamilton		Composer
2012	Kaleidoscope Dream	Miguel	Composer
2011	2011 POP Hits [Rhino]	Various Artist	Composer, Producer
2011	Anything	Musiq Soulchild / Swizz Beatz	Composer
2011	Out of My Head [Originally Performed by Lupe Fiasco featuring Trey Songz]	DJ Cover This	Composer
2011	U Smile	Dez Duron	Composer
2011	ZZ Top: A Tribute From Friends	Various Artist	Producer, Synthesizer
2011	Now, Vol. 17 [Canada]	Various Artists	Composer
2011	My Life II...The Journey Continues (Act 1)	Mary J. Blige	Composer, Producer
2011	Musiqinthemagiq	Musiq Soulchild	Composer, Fender Jazz Bass, Fender Rhodes, Keyboards, Producer, Synthesizer, Synthesizer Strings
2011	Lasers	Lupe Fiasco	Composer, Producer
2011	Chartbuster Karaoke Gold: Justin Bieber		Composer
2011	Back to Love	Anthony Hamilton	Composer
2010	Chartbuster Karaoke: Pop/Urban - October 2010		Composer
2010	Karaoke: Pop Hits of the Month - October 2010		Composer
2010	The Appeal: Georgia's Most Wanted	Gucci Mane	Composer, Keyboards, Producer
2010	Pop Party, Vol. 8		Composer
2010	Piano Tribute To Justin Bieber		Composer
2010	Outta This World	JLS	Composer, Keyboards, Producer
2010	No Boys Allowed	Keri Hilson	Composer, Composer/Lyricist, Producer
2010	My Worlds Acoustic	Justin Bieber	Composer
2010	My Worlds	Justin Bieber	Composer
2010	My World 2.0	Justin Bieber	Composer
2010	Mr. I	Ronald Isley	Producer
2010	Last Train to Paris	Diddy / Diddy - Dirty Money	Producer
2009	The Last	Aventura	Keyboards
2009	Ouvrir Mes Ailes	Medhy Custos	Drums
2008	Lyfe Change	Lyfe Jennings	Keyboards, Vocoder
2008	Laura Warshauer [2008]	Laura Warshauer	Main Personnel, Keyboards
2008	Back to Now	Labelle	Keyboards, Programming
2007	The Color of Money	Duo Live	Additional Personnel, Keyboards
2007	Other Side [Bonus Track]	Gary "G" Jenkins	Producer
2007	Evolution	Passi	Programming, Realization, Composer
2007	Eclipse	Jane Fostin	Arranger, Clavier, String Arrangements
2007	Desire	Pharoahe Monch	Main Personnel, Keyboards
2007	Carnival, Vol. II: Memoirs of an Immigrant	Wyclef Jean	Keyboards
2007	Basement Bhangra	DJ Rekha	Mixing
2007	American Gangster	Jay-Z	Strings, Piano, Fender Rhodes, Keyboards, Bass
2006	Who Woulda Thought	Pony Boi	Producer
2006	There's Something About Remy: Based on a True Story	Remy Ma	Keyboards
2006	Songs in A Minor/The Diary of Alicia Keys	Alicia Keys	Audio Production
2006	Son of Pain	Governor	Producer, Composer
2001	Songs in A Minor	Alicia Keys	Producer, Arranger, Keyboards
2001	Jimmy Cozier	Jimmy Cozier	Keyboards
2000	The Piece Maker	Tony Touch	Engineer
2000	Anarchy	Busta Rhymes	Engineer, Recording
2000	The Best of Busta Rhymes	Busta Rhymes	Recording
	Sweet 17	Laura Warshauer	Laura Warshauer
	The Feat. Best	Ai	Composer
	Rap Workout (Hip-Hop Tracks for the Gym)	Various Artists	Engineer
	Chill Rap		Composer
