= Wayne Isham =

American director

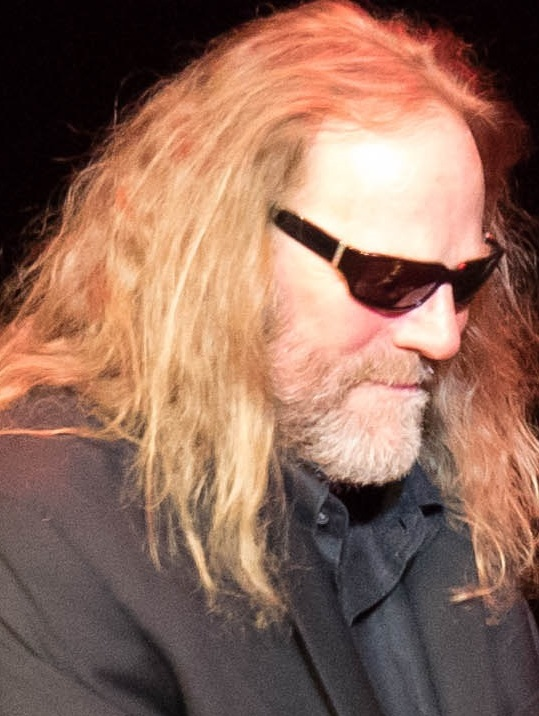
- Isham receiving an award at the Camerimage Festival in 2017
- Born: December 2, 1958 (age 67); Vinita, Oklahoma, U.S.
- Education: University of California, Santa Barbara
- Occupation: Director
- Years active: 1984–present
- Children: 2
- Website: wayneisham.com

Wayne Isham (born December 2, 1958) is an American film director and music video director who has directed films and music videos of many popular artists.

== Early life and education ==
Isham was born on December 2, 1958 in Vinita, Oklahoma. He attended the University of California, Santa Barbara in the 1970s. While at UC Santa Barbara, David Bowie's music video for "Ashes to Ashes" was released. Costing £250,000, it was the most expensive music video made at the time. Isham has cited this music video as his inspiration to start producing music videos.

== Career ==
Isham has worked with artists such as Bon Jovi, Paulina Rubio, Judas Priest, Whitney Houston, Michael Jackson, Janet Jackson, Journey, Kiss, Roxette, Mötley Crüe, Britney Spears, Kelly Clarkson, Whitesnake, David Cook, Simple Plan, Avenged Sevenfold, Pantera, *NSYNC, Backstreet Boys, 98 Degrees, Shania Twain, Westlife, Metallica, Foo Fighters, Nickelback, Muse, Keith Urban, Godsmack, OneRepublic, Leona Lewis, Aaliyah, Pink Floyd, Sheryl Crow, Megadeth, Madonna, Avril Lavigne, Def Leppard, Darius Rucker, Adam Lambert, Ricky Martin and Nadine Coyle among others.

In 1998, Isham ventured into feature film directing with 12 Bucks.

== Honors and awards ==
Isham, alongside Bon Jovi, was a co-winner of MTV's Michael Jackson Video Vanguard Award in 1991.

For Isham's direction of the Spanish-language version of Ricky Martin's "She Bangs", he won a Latin Grammy Award for Best Short Form Music Video at the Latin Grammy Awards of 2001 in addition to "Video of the Year" at Premio Lo Nuestro 2001.

At the 16th Annual Music Video Production Association Awards held on May 16, 2007, Isham was awarded The Lifetime Achievement Award at the Orpheum Theatre.

At the 2008 MTV Video Music Awards, Isham won numerous awards for Britney Spears's "Piece of Me" music video including the MTV Video Music Award for Video of the Year, MTV Video Music Award for Best Female Video, and MTV Video Music Award for Best Pop Video.

== Personal life ==
Isham is married with two children.

== Select videography ==
1984

- "Caught in the Act" (cameraman) - Styx

1985

- "I Don't Know Why You Don't Want Me" - Rosanne Cash
- "Smokin' In the Boys Room" - Mötley Crüe
- "Home Sweet Home" - Mötley Crüe
- "Everybody's Crazy" - Michael Bolton
- "Alone Again" - Dokken

1986

- "Pretty in Pink" - The Psychedelic Furs
- "You Know I Love You… Don't You?" - Howard Jones
- "You Give Love A Bad Name" - Bon Jovi
- "Livin' on a Prayer" - Bon Jovi
- "Point of No Return" - Nu Shooz
- "Turbo Lover" - Judas Priest

1987

- "Wanted Dead or Alive" - Bon Jovi
- "Girls, Girls, Girls" - Mötley Crüe
- "Wild Side" - Mötley Crüe
- "You're All I Need" - Mötley Crüe
- "Never Say Goodbye" - Bon Jovi
- "So Emotional" - Whitney Houston
- "Heat of the Night" - Bryan Adams

1988

- "In the Round, in Your Face" (concert film) - Def Leppard
- "Pour Some Sugar on Me" - Def Leppard
- "Armageddon It" - Def Leppard
- "Miracle Man" - Ozzy Osbourne
- "Never Givin Up" - The BusBoys
- "Bad Medicine" - Bon Jovi
- "Crazy Babies" - Ozzy Osbourne
- "Delicate Sound of Thunder" (concert film) - Pink Floyd
- "Born to Be My Baby" - Bon Jovi

1989

- "Dr. Feelgood" - Mötley Crüe
- "I'll Be There for You" - Bon Jovi
- "Lay Your Hands on Me" - Bon Jovi
- "18 and Life" - Skid Row
- "Living in Sin" - Bon Jovi
- "Kickstart My Heart" - Mötley Crüe
- "Rock and a Hard Place" - The Rolling Stones
- "Money" - Pink Floyd

1990

- "What It Takes" (concept version) - Aerosmith
- "Now You're Gone" - Whitesnake
- "Black Cat" - Janet Jackson
- "Painkiller" - Judas Priest
- "A Touch of Evil" - Judas Priest
- "Same Ol' Situation (S.O.S.)" - Mötley Crüe
- "Almost Hear You Sigh" - The Rolling Stones

1991

- "Enter Sandman" - Metallica
- "Operation: Livecrime" (concert film) - Queensrÿche
- "Spending My Time" - Roxette
- "Church of Your Heart" - Roxette
- "Wasted Time" - Skid Row

1992

- "Have You Ever Needed Someone So Bad" - Def Leppard
- "Rest in Peace" - Extreme
- "Symphony of Destruction" - Megadeth
- "Wherever I May Roam" - Metallica
- "Sad but True" - Metallica
- "(Do You Get) Excited?" - Roxette

1993

- "Bed of Roses" - Bon Jovi
- "Freakit" - Das EFX
- "Long Way from Home" - Johnny Gill
- "Sweating Bullets" - Megadeth
- "99 Ways to Die" - Megadeth
- "Whatzupwitu" - Eddie Murphy featuring Michael Jackson
- "Bumped" - Right Said Fred

1994

- "I Am I" - Queensrÿche
- "5 Minutes Alone" - Pantera
- "Train of Consequences" - Megadeth
- "A Tout Le Monde" - Megadeth
- "Night Moves" - Bob Seger

1995

- "Don't Cry" - Seal
- "You Are Not Alone" - Michael Jackson
- "Water Runs Dry" - Boyz II Men

1996

- "When You Love a Woman" - Journey

1997

- "Janie, Don't Take Your Love to Town" - Jon Bon Jovi
- "Shout It Out Loud" (Live From Tiger Stadium) - Kiss
- "Cunning Stunts" (concert film) - Metallica
- "Havana" - Kenny G

1998

- "Miami" - Will Smith
- "Because of You" - 98 Degrees
- "Cruel Summer" - Ace of Base
- "Got You (Where I Want You)" - The Flys
- "Fuel" - Metallica
- "Hard Times Come Easy" - Richie Sambora
- "La Bomba" - Ricky Martin
- "Vuelve" - Ricky Martin
- "The Cup of Life" - Ricky Martin

1999

- "I Want It That Way" - Backstreet Boys
- "Real Life" - Bon Jovi
- "Promises" - Def Leppard
- "Lay Down (Candles in the Rain) - Meredith Brooks
- "Livin' la Vida Loca" - Ricky Martin
- "Shake Your Bon-Bon" - Ricky Martin
- "Swear It Again" (U.K. version) - Westlife
- "S&M" - Metallica
- "Touched" - VAST

2000

- "Give Me Just One Night (Una Noche)" - 98 Degrees
- "I Do (Cherish You)" - 98 Degrees
- "The Hardest Thing" - 98 Degrees
- "The Way You Want Me To" - 98 Degrees
- "Try Again" - Aaliyah
- "She Bangs" - Ricky Martin
- "I Disappear" - Metallica
- "Bye Bye Bye" - NSYNC
- "It's Gonna Be Me" - NSYNC
- "It's My Life" - Bon Jovi
- "Say It Isn't So" - Bon Jovi
- "Thank You For Loving Me" - Bon Jovi

2001

- "Pop" - NSYNC
- "Hit 'Em Up Style (Oops!)" - Blu Cantrell
- "I'm Not a Girl, Not Yet a Woman" - Britney Spears
- "Forever" - Kid Rock
- "Nobody Wants to Be Lonely" - Ricky Martin & Christina Aguilera

2002

- "Father and Daughter" - Paul Simon
- "The One You Love" - Paulina Rubio
- "Extreme Ways" – Moby
- "Extreme Ways (The Bourne Identity version)" – Moby
- "Soak Up the Sun" - Sheryl Crow
- "Steve McQueen" - Sheryl Crow

2003

- "Out of Control" - Hoobastank
- "Frantic" - Metallica
- "The First Cut Is the Deepest" - Sheryl Crow

2004

- "Let Me Go" - 3 Doors Down
- "Days Go By" - Keith Urban
- "Survival of the Sickest" - Saliva
- "Don't!" - Shania Twain

2005

- "Welcome to Wherever You Are" - Bon Jovi
- "Mississippi Girl" - Faith Hill
- "Don't Cha Wanna Ride" - Joss Stone
- "I Ain't No Quitter" - Shania Twain
- "Come On, Come In" - Velvet Revolver

2006

- "Landing in London" - 3 Doors Down
- "Seize the Day" - Avenged Sevenfold
- "If I Didn't Know Any Better" - Alison Krauss and Union Station
- "It Ends Tonight" - The All-American Rejects
- "Speak" - Godsmack
- "It's Not That Easy" - Lemar

2007

- "Non Siamo Soli" - Eros Ramazzotti & Ricky Martin
- "If That's OK with You" - Shayne Ward
- "Piece of Me" - Britney Spears (Winner of 3 MTV Video Music Awards)
- "Manda Una Señal" - Maná

2008

- "Let Me Be Myself" - 3 Doors Down
- "The Best Damn Thing" - Avril Lavigne
- "Forgive Me" - Leona Lewis
- "Catch Me If You Can" - Boys Like Girls
- "Your Love Is a Lie" - Simple Plan
- "Afterlife" - Avenged Sevenfold
- "In Love with a Girl" - Gavin DeGraw
- "Light On" - David Cook
- "Don't Think I Don't Think About It" - Darius Rucker
- "My Hallelujah Song" - Julianne Hough
- "Winter Wonderland" - Darius Rucker

2009

- "My Life Would Suck Without You" - Kelly Clarkson
- "Modern Day Delilah" - Kiss
- "Broken, Beat & Scarred" - Metallica
- "It Won't Be Like This for Long" - Darius Rucker
- "Rusted from the Rain" - Billy Talent
- "Alright" - Darius Rucker
- "All The Right Moves" - OneRepublic
- "Time for Miracles" - Adam Lambert
- "Resistance" - Muse
- "Orgullo, Pasión y Gloria: Tres Noches en la Ciudad de México" - Metallica

2010

- "I Like It" - Enrique Iglesias
- "Nightmare" - Avenged Sevenfold
- "Sign Your Name" - Sheryl Crow
- "Summer Day" - Sheryl Crow
- "Love Left to Lose" - Sons of Sylvia
- "Beautiful Monster" - Ne-Yo
- "Champagne Life" - Ne-Yo
- "One in a Million" - Ne-Yo
- "Insatiable" - Nadine Coyle
- "What Do You Got?" - Bon Jovi

2011

- "Hollywood Tonight" - Michael Jackson
- "So Far Away" - Avenged Sevenfold
- "Weird Al" Yankovic Live! – The Alpocalypse Tour

2012

- "These Days" - Foo Fighters
- "Goodbye in Her Eyes" - Zac Brown Band
- "Quebec Magnetic" (concert film) - Metallica

2013

- "Shepherd of Fire" - Avenged Sevenfold

2014

- "Edge of a Revolution" - Nickelback
- "What Are You Waiting For?" - Nickelback
- "Nothing But a Heartache" by Neil Diamond
- "Something Blue" by Neil Diamond

2015

- "Irresistible" – Fall Out Boy featuring Demi Lovato

2016

- "Church Bells" – Carrie Underwood

2018

- "Zombie" - Bad Wolves
