= Home for the Holidays (Darius Rucker album) =

Studio album by Darius Rucker
- Released: October 27, 2014
- Genre: Christmas, country
- Label: Capitol Nashville
- Producer: Frank Rogers

Darius Rucker chronology
True Believers (2013)	Home for the Holidays (2014)	Southern Style (2015)

Home for the Holidays is the first Christmas-themed album and fifth studio album from Darius Rucker, released on October 27, 2014, through Capitol Records Nashville. The album, produced by Frank Rogers, is a collection of twelve Christmas songs, including two originals and a collaboration with Sheryl Crow.

== Background and recording ==
On September 5, 2014, Sheryl Crow posted a picture of herself with Rucker on her Facebook page and wrote: "I love Darius Rucker - Merry Christmas Baby! (I sang on his upcoming Christmas record!)"

On September 15, 2014, it was announced that Rucker had completed his first Christmas album and that it would be released on October 27, 2014.

In an interview with Rolling Stone, Rucker expressed his enthusiasm over his first Christmas album:

"I am so excited to finally make a Christmas album. This has been a lifelong dream, and I hope my fans enjoy listening as much as I enjoyed making it."

== Release ==
=== Album ===
Home for the Holidays was released on October 27, 2014, through Capitol Records Nashville.

== Reception ==
=== Critical ===
Professional ratings
Review scores
Source	Rating
AllMusic	3/5 stars

Home for the Holidays received mostly positive feedback from music critics. In a three out of five star review, Stephen Thomas Erlewine of AllMusic states the album "winds up as a perfectly fine Christmas record, suited for those Rucker fans who have stuck with him from Hootie to R&B to country."

=== Commercial ===
Home for the Holidays debuted at No. 31 on the US Billboard 200 chart and No. 7 on the US Billboard Top Country Albums chart, selling 9,000 copies in its first week. It rose to No. 3 on the Top Country Albums chart in its fifth week of release, and No. 25 on the Billboard 200 on its sixth week. As of December 2016 the album has sold 220,800 copies in the US.

== Track listing ==
Standard edition
No.	Title	Writer(s)	Original artist	Length
1.	"Let It Snow, Let It Snow, Let It Snow"	Sammy Cahn, Jule Styne		2:56
2.	"Have Yourself A Merry Little Christmas"	Hugh Martin, Ralph Blane		3:39
3.	"What God Wants for Christmas"	Darius Rucker, Frank Rogers, Monty Criswell		3:37
4.	"You're a Mean One, Mr. Grinch"	Theodor "Dr. Seuss" Geisel, Albert Hague	Thurl Ravenscroft	3:27
5.	"Baby, It's Cold Outside" (featuring Sheryl Crow)	Frank Loesser		3:45
6.	"I'll Be Home for Christmas"	Kim Gannon, Walter Kent, Buck Ram		3:53
7.	"O Come, All Ye Faithful"	Frederick Oakeley, John Francis Wade	Frederick Oakeley, John Francis Wade	4:05
8.	"Winter Wonderland"	Felix Bernard, Richard B. Smith		2:48
9.	"Candy Cane Christmas"	Rucker, Rogers, Steve Leslie	Darius Rucker	3:22
10.	"Please Come Home for Christmas"	Charles Brown, Gene Redd	Charles Brown	4:11
11.	"Hark! The Herald Angels Sing"	Charles Wesley		3:52
12.	"White Christmas"	Irving Berlin		3:39

== Chart performance ==
=== Weekly charts ===
Chart (2014–15)	Peak position
US Billboard 200	25
US Top Country Albums (Billboard)	3
US Top Holiday Albums (Billboard)	2

=== Year-end charts ===
Chart (2015)	Position
US Top Country Albums (Billboard)	30

== Release history ==
Region	Date	Format(s)	Label
United States	October 27, 2014	CD; Digital download	Capitol Nashville
