= Hootie & the Blowfish (album) =

Studio album by Hootie & the Blowfish
- Released: March 4, 2003
- Recorded: May 2002
- Genre: Soft rock
- Length: 47:34
- Label: Atlantic
- Producer: Don Was

Hootie & the Blowfish chronology
Scattered, Smothered and Covered (2000)	Hootie & the Blowfish (2003)	The Best of Hootie & the Blowfish: 1993-2003 (2004)

Hootie & the Blowfish is the fourth studio album by American rock band Hootie & the Blowfish, released on March 4, 2003. It is their last album under Atlantic Records. The lead singles were "Innocence" and "Space", and the album itself reached no. 46 in the U.S.

Professional ratings
Review scores
Source	Rating
AllMusic	3/5 stars
Entertainment Weekly	B−
Rolling Stone	2/5 stars

== Track listing ==
All songs written by Mark Bryan, Dean Felber, Darius Rucker and Jim Sonefeld, except “The Rain Song,” originally performed and written by Continental Drifters.

1. "Deeper Side" – 3:38
2. "Little Brother" – 3:09
3. "Innocence" – 3:24
4. "Space" – 2:15
5. "I'll Come Runnin'" – 3:48
6. "Tears Fall Down" – 3:05
7. "The Rain Song" – 3:52
8. "Show Me Your Heart" – 4:03
9. "When She's Gone" – 4:06
10. "Little Darlin'" – 3:18
11. "Woody" – 3:15
12. "Go and Tell Him (Soup Song)", includes the hidden track: "It's Alright" – 9:41

== Personnel ==
Hootie & the Blowfish

- Mark Bryan – lead guitar, electric guitar, slide guitar, acoustic guitar, mandolin, background vocals
- Dean Felber – bass guitar, background vocals
- Darius Rucker – lead vocals, rhythm guitar, harmonica
- Jim "Soni" Sonefeld – drums, percussion, acoustic guitar (6, 9), loops, background vocals

Additional musicians

- John Nau – piano, organ
- Gary Greene – percussion
- Don Was – Rhodes (2), trumpet and saxophone (8)
- Vicki Peterson – background vocals (7)
- Susan Cowsill – background vocals (7)
- Emily Saliers – background vocals (9)

Technical personnel

- Don Was – producer (1, 2, 4–12)
- Pete Masitti – producer (3)
- Ed Cherney – engineer and mixing (1, 2, 4–12)
- Bob St. John – engineer and mixing (3)
- Nick Brophy – Pro Tools engineer
- Bob Ludwig – mastering

== Charts ==
Chart (2003)	Peak position
US Billboard 200	46
