= Back to Then =

Studio album by Darius Rucker
- Released: July 30, 2002
- Genre: Neo soul; R&B
- Length: 51:13
- Label: Hidden Beach
- Producer: Delite; Kenny Flav; Jimmy Cozier; Vidal Davis; Ivan Dupée; Edward "DJ Eddie F" Ferrell; Darren "Limitless" Henson; Jeeve; The Characters

Darius Rucker chronology
Back to Then (2002)	Learn to Live (2008)

Professional ratings
Review scores
Source	Rating
AllMusic	3/5 stars
Entertainment Weekly	C
People	(mixed)
PopMatters	(favorable)
Rolling Stone	2.5/5 stars

Back to Then is the first studio album by the American singer Darius Rucker, lead singer of Hootie & the Blowfish. The album marks a stylistic departure of the alternative rock sound of Hootie & the Blowfish in favor of an R&B style.

The song "This Is My World" was used in the soundtrack for the film, Shallow Hal.

== Track listing ==
Back to Then track listing
No.	Title	Writer(s)	Producer(s)	Length
1.	"Wild One"	Vidal Davis; Ryan Toby; Andre Harris	Vidal Davis; Andre "Dirty" Harris	3:38
2.	"Exodus"	Carvin Haggins; Keith Pelzer; Darren Henson; Darius Rucker; Kenna Zemedkun; Taalib Johnson	Keith Pelzer; Darren Henson; Carvin Haggins	4:11
3.	"Sometimes I Wonder" (featuring Jill Scott)	Rucker; Jill Scott; Harris; Davis; Aja Graydon	Harris; Davis	4:14
4.	"Back to Then"	Harris; Kipper Jones; Rucker; Derek Washington	Harris	4:58
5.	"This Is My World"	Henson; Pelzer; Rucker; Zemedkun	Henson; Pelzer	5:05
6.	"I'm Glad You're Mine"	Al Green	Travis House; Jeeve	3:05
7.	"Butterfly"	Peter Black	Jeeve; House	4:31
8.	"Hold On"	Jimmy Cozier Jr.; Rucker; Justin Cozier; Sid Phillips	Jimmy Cozier Jr.; Sid Vee^{[a]}; Arden Altino^{[a]}	4:06
9.	"Ten Years"	Rucker; Edward Ferrell; Darren Lighty; Cynthia Loving	Edward "Eddie F" Ferrell; Darren Lighty	3:56
10.	"One More Night"	Jazz Nixon; Rucker	Jazz Nixon	4:17
11.	"Amazing Grace" (Interlude)	John Newton		0:48
12.	"Somewhere"	Nixon; Rucker; Daniel Johnson	Nixon	3:41
13.	"Sleeping in My Bed" (featuring Snoop Dogg)	Darrell Allamby; Rucker; Antoinette Roberson; Kenneth Dickerson; Calvin Broadus	Ivan Dupée; Darrell "Delite" Allamby^{[b]}; Kenny "Kenny-Flav" Dickerson^{[b]}	4:43
Total length:				51:13

Japanese edition (bonus tracks)
No.	Title	Writer(s)	Producer(s)	Length
14.	"Sexy Lover"	Rucker; Charles Farrar; Troy Taylor	The Characters	3:42
15.	"When's the Last Time"	Rucker; Farrar; Taylor	The Characters	3:53

Notes

- ^{^[a]} signifies a co-producer
- ^{^[b]} signifies a vocal producer

== Personnel ==
Credits adapted from album's liner notes.

- Darrell "Delite" Allamby – backing vocals (track 13)
- Arden Altino – co-producer (track 8)
- Davis Barnett – viola (track 5)
- Rob Chiarelli – mixing (tracks 1–5)
- Chris Conway – engineer (track 8)
- Jimmy Cozier – producer, vocal arrangements, and backing vocals (track 8)
- Mike Davis – trombone (track 10)
- Vidal Davis – producer (tracks 1, 3, 4), engineer and drums (track 3)
- Ivan Dupée – producer, engineer, mixing, programming, bass guitar, clavinet, drum programming, Fender Rhodes, organ, synthesizer, and vocal arrangements (track 13)
- Ethan Farmer – bass guitar (track 12)
- Edward "DJ Eddie F" Ferrell – producer, arrangements, drum programming, and instrumentation (track 9)
- Erik Ferrell – assistant engineer (track 9)
- Brian Garten – engineer (track 6)
- Serban Ghenea – engineer (tracks 1, 2, 4)
- Ask Giz – engineer (track 9)
- Larry Gold – strings (track 3), cello (track 5)
- Vivian Green – backing vocals (track 4)
- Carvin Haggins – producer and backing vocals (track 2)
- Woody Harrelson – backing vocals (track 8)
- Andre Harris – producer (tracks 1, 3, 4), engineer and keyboards (track 3)
- Keith Henderson – guitar (track 13)
- Darren Henson – producer (tracks 2, 5)
- Shawn Hibbler – drum fills and hi-hats (track 13)
- Travis House – producer (tracks 6, 7), engineer and mixing (track 7)
- Jim Hynes – trumpet (track 10)
- Gwen Jackson – backing vocals (track 2)
- Jeeve – producer (tracks 6, 7), engineer and mixing (track 7)
- Daniel Johnson – backing vocals (tracks 10, 12)
- Kipper Jones – backing vocals (track 4)
- Jeff Kievit – trumpet (track 10)
- Olga Konopelsky – violin (track 5)
- Emma Kummrow – violin (track 5)
- Darren Lighty – producer, arrangements, drum programming, and instrumentation (track 9)
- David Lopez – engineer (tracks 10, 12)
- Lil' Mo – backing vocals (track 9)
- Joe Mardin – horn arrangements (track 10)
- Darius "D-Rain" McGuire – backing vocals (track 8)
- Musiq – backing vocals (track 2)
- Jazz Nixon – producer (tracks 10, 12)
- Richard Patterson – bass fills (track 13)
- Keith Pelzer – producer (tracks 2, 5), engineer and Fender Rhodes (track 5)
- Kevin Perry – assistant engineer (track 9)
- Gus Rickette – drum programming (track 13)
- Paul Riezer – violin (track 5)
- Antoinette Roberson – backing vocals (track 13)
- Eric Roberson – backing vocals (tracks 1, 4, 13)
- Jacob Robinson – engineer and mixing (track 13)
- Darius Rucker – lead vocals (all tracks), vocal arrangements and backing vocals (tracks 8, 13)
- Erik Sayles – acoustic guitar (tracks 2, 4)
- Jill Scott – lead vocals and vocal arrangements (track 3)
- Andy Snitzer – saxophone (track 10)
- Snoop Dogg – additional vocals (track 13)
- Greg Tepperman – violin (track 5)
- Ryan Toby – vocal arrangements and backing vocals (track 1)
- Terry Tribbett – bass guitar (tracks 3, 5)
- Sid Vee – co-producer (track 8)
- Dave Way – mixing (tracks 6, 8–10, 12)
- Jimmy "June Bug" White – engineer (track 3)
- Josh Wilbur – engineer (track 10)
- Byron Williams – organ (tracks 10, 12)
- Jay Williams – guitar (track 12)
- Rick Williams – guitar and bass guitar (track 10)
- Kenna Zemedkun – backing vocals (track 2)

== Chart performance ==
Chart (2002)	Peak position
US Billboard 200	127
US Top R&B Albums (Billboard)	43
