= True Believers (song) =

Single by Darius Rucker

from the album True Believers
- Released: August 27, 2012
- Genre: Country
- Length: 4:03
- Label: Capitol Nashville
- Songwriters: Darius Rucker; Josh Kear
- Producer: Frank Rogers

Darius Rucker singles chronology
"I Got Nothin'" (2011)	"True Believers" (2012)	"Wagon Wheel" (2013)

"True Believers" is a song co-written recorded by American country music artist Darius Rucker. It was released in August 2012 as his first single and title track from his album True Believers. Rucker wrote the song with Josh Kear.

== Critical reception ==
Billy Dukes of Taste of Country gave the song four and a half stars out of five, writing that it "begins as a mild and unremarkable pop-country song before clever production and Rucker’s unforgettable voice find one soaring in the euphoria." Matt Bjorke of Roughstock gave the song a favorable review, saying that it "showcases one of Darius strongest lyrics to date."

Ben Foster of Country Universe gave the song a C grade, writing that "Rucker’s voice is marred by the usual spit-shine wall-of-sound Nashville production, thoroughly blocking the connection with the listener, and hindering what otherwise might have been a qualified success."

== Music video ==
The music video was directed by Jim Wright and premiered in October 2012.

== Chart performance ==
"True Believers" debuted at number 26 on the U.S. Billboard Hot Country Songs chart for the week of September 15, 2012, the highest debut of his career.

Chart (2012)	Peak position
Canada Country (Billboard)	46
US Billboard Bubbling Under Hot 100	8
US Hot Country Songs (Billboard)	24
US Country Airplay (Billboard)	17

=== Year-end charts ===
Chart (2012)	Position
US Country Songs (Billboard)	87
