= Howl Owl Howl =

American country rock supergroup

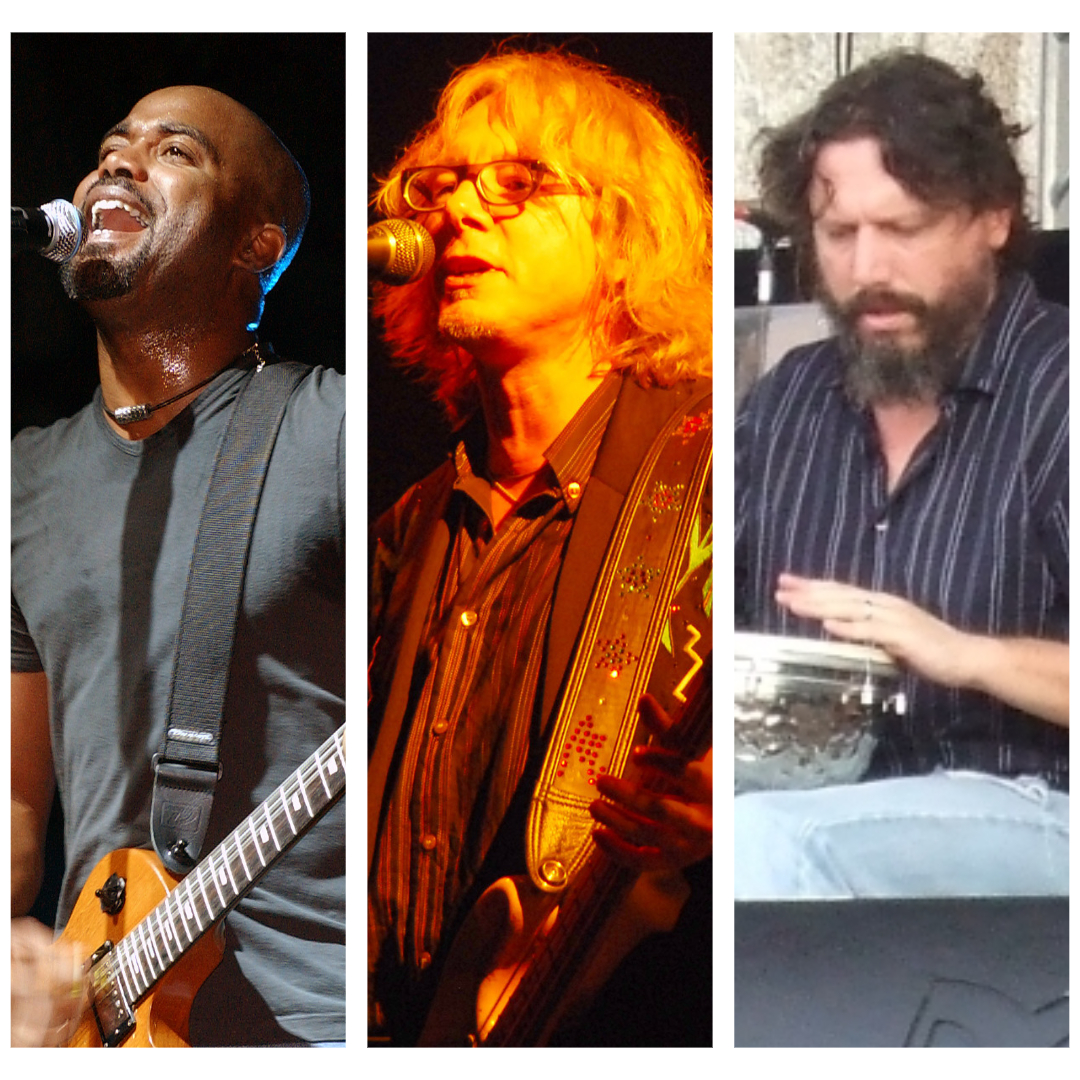
- Lineup of Howl Owl Howl. From left to right: Darius Rucker, Mike Mills, Steve Gorman

Background information
- Origin: Seattle, Washington, United States
- Genres: Country, country rock, progressive country, Australiana, bush ballad, raga rock
- Years active: 2021–present
- Label: Grateful Dead Records
- Spinoff of: Hootie & the Blowfish, R.E.M., The Black Crowes
- Members: Darius Rucker; Mike Mills; Steve Gorman

Howl Owl Howl is an American country rock supergroup composed of Hootie & the Blowfish singer Darius Rucker, R.E.M. bassist Mike Mills, and former The Black Crowes drummer Steve Gorman. The band formed in 2021, but did not release its first single, "My Cologne," untl October 31, 2025.

Howl Owl Howl came together in 2019 when Gorman organized a benefit show for his child's school. He invited Rucker to join and Mills came along. They began developing songs as a band in 2021. R.E.M. singer Michael Stipe named the group.

Their first single, "My Cologne," was inspired by singer Ariana Grande naming a perfume "R.E.M." in honor of her song of the same name. Their not-yet-completed debut album features the songs “Fear,” “Doesn’t Matter Now,” “See Me Now,” “Window to My Soul,” “Leftover,” and “Dog of Life.” On November 3, 2025, the band played their first show in Indianapolis, as part of a North American mini-tour throughout the month, visiting other cities such as Chicago, Washington, D.C., Boston, New York, and Atlanta, accompanied by guitarist/keyboardist Rich Gilbert and guitarist Sol Philcox-Littlefield.

== Singles ==
- "My Cologne" (2025) (Grateful Dead Records)
