= Mr. I =

Studio album by Ronald Isley
- Released: November 30, 2010
- Recorded: 2010
- Studios: Chalice (Hollywood); The Warehouse (Atlanta); Larrabee Sound (Hollywood); Notifi (St. Louis); Platinum Sound (New York City); Record Plant (Los Angeles)
- Genres: Neo soul; contemporary R&B
- Length: 40:11
- Labels: Def Soul Classics; Def Jam
- Producers: Ronald Isley (exec.); L.A. Reid (exec.); Marcus King (exec.); Kajun; Fuego; Max Gousse; Ezekiel "Zeke" Lewis; Tricky Stewart; Greg Curtis; Song Dynasty; Mello; Jerry Duplessis; Arden Altino; Keaver Brenai

Ronald Isley chronology
Here I Am (2003)	Mr. I (2010)	This Song Is for You (2013)

Singles from Mr. I
- 1. "What I Miss the Most" Released: November 2, 2010; 2. "Put Your Money on Me" Released: February 15, 2011

Mr. I is the debut solo studio album by American R&B lead singer of The Isley Brothers, Ronald Isley. It was released on November 30, 2010.

After his 56-year tenure with the group, Isley developed a solo album early on throughout his career. Mr. I is also Isley's comeback album after his release from a three-year federal prison sentence on tax charges earlier that April. It is also his only solo album under Def Jam Recordings; he left the label in October 2011. The album is also the final album to be released under Def Jam's Def Soul Classics factionary imprint and overall, the final album released under Def Soul as a whole; Def Soul would be folded into Def Jam in May 2011.

The album received generally positive reviews from critics, but performed underwhelmingly, debuting at number fifty on the Billboard 200.

== Background ==
In the midst of the releases of 2006's Baby Makin' Music and 2007's I'll Be Home for Christmas with the Isley Brothers, bandleader Ronald Isley was engulfed in financial troubles, having owed over $3.1 million in unpaid taxes to the Internal Revenue Service. He was convicted of tax evasion and sentenced to three years in federal prison.

In 2007, he suffered from kidney failure. That same year, his son, Ronald Isley, Jr., was born. Isley was unable to attend his son's birth with his wife, former JS singer Kandy, due to his stint.

While imprisoned, he began writing lyrics for his solo album after being inspired by a phone conversation he had with Def Jam chairman L.A. Reid. In 2010, Isley was released from prison and spent the rest of his sentence in a halfway house, where he was also released on April 13.

In June, development for the album resumed. On September 9, 2010, a cover version of the Carpenters' "(They Long to Be) Close to You", sung by Isley and former Fugees pioneer Lauryn Hill leaked. It was rumored to have been planned for inclusion on either Mr. I or Hill's unreleased second studio album, but was never interred.

== Singles ==
In October 2010, "No More" was released as the promotional single for Mr. I. On November 2, four weeks ahead of the album's release, "What I Miss the Most" was released as the first official single for the album. On February 15, 2011, "Put Your Money on Me", featuring rapper T.I., was made into the official second single.

== Critical reception ==
Professional ratings
Review scores
Source	Rating
About.com	4/5 stars
AllMusic	2.5/5 stars

On AllMusic, the album has been rated two and a half out of five stars. In a review, Andy Kellman quoted "This time out, for whatever reason, there’s an effort to make more of the songs sound like they are coming from someone one-third Isley’s age. The rapid stutter kick drums, syrupy vocal interjections, and backing shouts in “Put Your Money on Me,” for example, are much more suited for guest star T.I. than Isley. When Mr. I plays to Isley’s strengths, as on atmospheric ballads that avoid the come-ons of twentysomething singers (“Dance for Me,” “What I Miss the Most”), it’s just fine, very much in the vein of latter-day Isley Brothers albums. Then again, several lines from “Supposed to Do”—like “Put them pictures on your Facebook and let them haters know”—make it all the more evident that we’re not in Atlantis anymore." Entertainment Weekly reviewed "Ron Isley's is one of the few powerful voices of '60s soul still serving it up. The Isley Brothers' lead loverboy continues to set the mood for bedroom capers with his balmy quiet-storm cuts, fawning over his lady's classic beauty on ”No More” and yearning for her with his delicate falsetto on ”I Need You.” On Mr. I, Isley, who recently completed a sentence for tax evasion, doesn't come off as an old man trying to keep up with 2010's class of oversexed R&B stars, but rather as a suave veteran gal-getter. His voice remains rich — and his libido strong."

== Commercial performance ==
The album debuted at number fifty on the Billboard 200.

== Track list ==
No.	Title	Writer(s)	Producer(s)	Length
1.	"Take It How You Want It"	Ronald Isley; Kandy Johnson-Isley	Kajun	3:45
2.	"No More"	Isley; Micah Powell; Max Gousse; Carlos Battey; S. Battey; Alexander Palmer	Fuego; Gousse; Ezekiel "Zeke" Lewis	4:02
3.	"If I Lose My Woman"	Lewis; Isley; Christopher "Tricky" Stewart	Stewart; Lewis	3:34
4.	"Put Your Money on Me" (featuring T.I.)	Isley; Gregory Curtis, Sr.; Jon Nettlesbey	Curtis, Sr.	3:46
5.	"Supposed to Do"	Isley; Durrell Babbs; J. Franklin; Robert "Bob" Newt; J. Valentine; Kris Stephens	Song Dynasty; Lewis	3:36
6.	"Dance for Me"	Isley; Curtis, Sr.; Nettlesbey; C. Branch	Curtis, Sr.	4:07
7.	"What I Miss the Most"	Curtis, Sr.; Nettlesbey	Curtis, Sr.	4:37
8.	"I Need You"	Isley; L. Austin; David Williamson; Lewis; Stewart	Stewart; Mello; Lewis	3:55
9.	"You've Got A Friend" (featuring Aretha Franklin)	Carole King	Jerry "Wonda" Duplessis; Arden "Keyz" Altino	4:56
10.	"You Had Me at Hello"	Branch; Curtis, Sr.; Nettlesbey	Curtis, Sr.	3:53
Total length:				40:11

== Charts ==
Chart performance for Mr. I
Chart (2010)	Peak position
US Billboard 200	50
US Top R&B/Hip-Hop Albums (Billboard)	11
