= This (song) =

Single by Darius Rucker

from the album Charleston, SC 1966
- Released: November 22, 2010
- Genre: Country
- Length: 3:38
- Label: Capitol Nashville
- Songwriters: Darius Rucker; Frank Rogers; Kara DioGuardi
- Producer: Frank Rogers

Darius Rucker singles chronology
"Come Back Song" (2010)	"This" (2010)	"I Got Nothin'" (2011)

Audio sample
- file; help

"This" is a song co-written and recorded by American country music artist Darius Rucker. It was released in November 2010 as the second single from his album Charleston, SC 1966, and the sixth solo single release of his career. It reached number-one on the U.S. Billboard Hot Country Songs chart in April 2011. Rucker wrote this song with his producer Frank Rogers and Kara DioGuardi.

== Critical reception ==
Sarah Rodman of the Boston Globe wrote that the song "falls squarely in the country pop sweet spot". Country Weekly reviewer Jessica Phillips said that it was "an accurate reflection" of Rucker's role as husband and father.

Karlie Justus of Engine 145 gave the song a thumbs-down, saying that it seemed too thematically similar to "Alright" and had "throwaway lyrics".

== Music video ==
The music video was directed by Trey Fanjoy and premiered in early 2011.

== Chart performance ==
Chart (2010–2011)	Peak position
US Billboard Hot 100	51
US Hot Country Songs (Billboard)	1
Canada Hot 100 (Billboard)	92
Canada Country (Billboard)	4

=== Year-end charts ===
Chart (2011)	Position
US Country Songs (Billboard)	23

== Certifications ==
Region	Certification	Certified units/sales
United States (RIAA)	Platinum	1,000,000^{‡}
^{‡} Sales+streaming figures based on certification alone.
