= Clay Mills =

American songwriter

Clayton Bernard "Clay" Mills is an American songwriter. His credits include the #1 hits "Beautiful Mess" by Diamond Rio and "Don't Think I Don't Think About It" by Darius Rucker, which won Mills awards from ASCAP. Other country music artists who have charted with his singles include Andy Griggs and Trisha Yearwood. Clay has had over 250 songs recorded worldwide, 16 ASCAP awards, and received Grammy nominations for his singles "Heaven, Heartache and the Power of Love" and "Beautiful Mess." Along with Marty Dodson he is the co-founder of the songwriter training site SongTown.com. In 2022, Mills was inducted into the Mississippi Songwriters Hall of Fame. That year’s class also included Hank Cochran, Bobbie Gentry, Robert Johnson and Conway Twitty. Clay is also the co-author of Mastering Melody Writing, a best-selling book for songwriters.

== List of Hit Singles co-written by Mills ==
- Diamond Rio — "Beautiful Mess" #1
- Darius Rucker — "Don't Think I Don't Think About It" #1
- Darius Rucker — "History in the Making" #2
- Darius Rucker — "I Got Nothin'" #15
- Clay Walker — "Fall" #5
- Trisha Yearwood — "Heaven, Heartache and the Power of Love" #19
- Andy Griggs — "She Thinks She Needs Me" #5
- Kimberley Locke — "Fall" #1 Dance/AC
- Little Big Town — "Don't Waste My Time"
- Danielle Peck — "I Don't"
- Shelly Fairchild — "You Don't Lie Here Anymore"
- Taranda Green — "Sky Full Of Angels" #1 Gospel Song —Southern Gospel Song-of-the-Year
- The Gastineaus — " Sky Full Of Angels" The Gastineaus (Southern Gospel #1 -2012)

== Other major artist recordings co-written by Mills ==
"One Day You Will" *Lady Antebellum

"Heaven Heartache" Baby Face & Trisha Yearwood

"A Lot To Learn About Living" Easton Corbin

"Gotta Love It" Joe Nichols

"Second Chance" Trisha Yearwood

"Sky Full Of Angels" Reba McEntire

"Sky Full of Angels" Taranda Greene (2006 Southern Gosple Song of the Year)

"Sky Full Of Angels" The Gastineaus (Southern Gospel #1 -2012)

"Things I'd Never Do" Darius Rucker

"Whenever You Love Somebody" Matt Wertz

"Just Drive" Jo Dee Messina

"A Strong Shot Of You" Jo Dee Messina

"I Did It For The Girl" Lonestar

"My Life's Been A Country Song" Chris Cagle

"Now I Know What Moma Meant" Chris Cagle

"Bohemian" Songs From The Road Band

"Will You Be Waiting" Dakota Bradley

"Only The Lonely talking" Steve Holy

"Homesick" Kristy Lee Cook

"Throwaway Day" Adam Gregory

"Rush" Jake Matthews

"Only The Lonely talking" Danielle Peck

"Lay Back Down" Danielle Peck

"Kiss You On The Mouth" Danielle Peck

"The Good Life" Donny & Marie

"I Don't" Judy Torres

"Not Even Monday" Cleve Francis

"Photo Booth" Carter Twins

"I Get That A Lot These Days" Shane Yellowbird

"The One And Lonely Me" Tejas Brothers

"That's Who I Come From" Diamond Hitch

"Sky Full Of Angels" Amber Martin

"Sky Full Of Angels" Bill Gaither

"You're My Summertime" Sarah Marince

"Just Bein' Me" Jaymi Renae

"A Brand New Day" Angel Rattay

"Don't Let Up" Eli Barsi

"You Can Hear A Heartbreak" Kelsey DiMarco

"Tough" Brandon Davis
