= It Won't Be Like This for Long =

Single by Darius Rucker

from the album Learn to Live
- Released: November 3, 2008
- Genre: Country
- Length: 3:39
- Label: Capitol Nashville
- Songwriters: Chris DuBois; Ashley Gorley; Darius Rucker
- Producer: Frank Rogers

Darius Rucker singles chronology
"Don't Think I Don't Think About It" (2008)	"It Won't Be Like This for Long" (2008)	"Alright" (2009)

"It Won't Be Like This for Long" is a song co-written and recorded by American country music artist Darius Rucker, lead vocalist of the rock band Hootie & the Blowfish. It was released in November 2008 as the second from his first country music album Learn to Live. Rucker co-wrote the song with Chris DuBois and Ashley Gorley.

== Content ==
The song is a ballad mostly accompanied by acoustic guitar and steel guitar. The song describes a couple who have just had a baby, and throughout it chronicles how their lives change by the child's presence. In the first verse, the child is crying at night, keeping both parents awake. The mother then tells the father that evenings will change when the child grows.

In the second verse, the daughter is four years old, and is being taken to preschool. She hangs on to her father's leg because she is afraid, and the teacher tells him "it won't be like this for long". By the third verse and bridge, the father is observing the daughter and realizing that the daughter will soon be grown up, and he will not be able to observe her much longer.

According to Country Weekly magazine, Rucker met with Chris DuBois and Ashley Gorley to write the song. The three songwriters were talking about their kids and "how quickly life changes." As the songwriters were talking, they decided to write the song.

== Critical reception ==
The song received a "thumbs down" review from the country music site Engine 145. Brady Vercher stated that "the lyric itself is too straightforward to carry much emotional resonance despite Rucker's best efforts." He also considered it derivative of Trace Adkins' early 2008 hit "You're Gonna Miss This", which was also co-written by Ashley Gorley and contains a theme of a parent observing a daughter's growing up. Allen Jacobs of Roughstock gave the song a more favorable review, saying that "Rucker's butter-smooth vocals catch a country cadence, as his balladeers a promise of improvement in a loved one - and his own life."

== Music video ==
A music video was released for the song in February 2009. As with his previous two music videos ("Don't Think I Don't Think About It" and "Winter Wonderland"), the video for "It Won't Be Like This for Long" was directed by Wayne Isham.

== Chart performance ==
The song debuted at number 45 on the Hot Country Songs chart dated November 1, 2008 and peaked at number 1 on the chart dated March 28, 2009 and remained there for the next two weeks.

Weekly chart performance
Chart (2008–2009)	Peak position
US Billboard Hot 100	36
US Hot Country Songs (Billboard)	1
Canada Hot 100 (Billboard)	59
Canada Country (Billboard)	1

=== Year-end charts ===
Annual chart rankings
Chart (2009)	Position
US Country Songs (Billboard)	4
US Radio Songs (Billboard)	76

== Certifications ==
Region	Certification	Certified units/sales
United States (RIAA)	Platinum	1,000,000^{‡}
^{‡} Sales+streaming figures based on certification alone.
