= Don't Think I Don't Think About It =

2008 single by Darius Rucker

Single by Darius Rucker

from the album Learn to Live
- Released: May 27, 2008
- Genre: Country
- Length: 3:03
- Label: Capitol Nashville
- Songwriters: Darius Rucker; Clay Mills
- Producer: Frank Rogers

Darius Rucker singles chronology
"Wild One" (2003)	"Don't Think I Don't Think About It" (2008)	"It Won't Be Like This for Long" (2008)

"Don't Think I Don't Think About It" is a song recorded by American country music artist Darius Rucker, lead singer of the band Hootie & the Blowfish. The song, co-written by Rucker and Clay Mills, was released in May 2008 as Rucker's first single from his album Learn to Live. The song made Rucker the first new individual black artist to chart a number one country hit since Charley Pride's "Night Games" reached the top of the charts in September 1983.

== Content ==
"Don't Think I Don't Think About It" is a mid-tempo, backed mainly by guitars. Its narrator describes a man who has left his former lover. He tells her that he thinks about what they could have been.

== Critical reception ==
The song received a positive review from Billboard reviewer Deborah Evans Price, who said that the single "is that perfect combination of solid production, a great vocal and finely crafted song that adds up to a hit." Entertainment Weekly simple called the song "pretty great," and People called it a "bittersweet ballad". In 2024, Rolling Stone ranked the song at #174 on its 200 Greatest Country Songs of All Time ranking.

== Music video ==
The music video was directed by Wayne Isham.

== Chart performance ==
"Don't Think I Don't Think About It" debuted at number 51 on the Hot Country Songs charts dated for May 3, 2008. The song reached a peak of number one on the chart week of October 4, making Rucker the first solo African-American artist to reach the top of the country charts since Charley Pride's "Night Games" in 1983. The song remained on top of the chart for a second consecutive week. It is also his first solo Top 40 hit on the Billboard Hot 100, at number 35. The song reached over a million copies in sales in May 2014.

Chart (2008)	Peak position
US Billboard Hot 100	35
US Hot Country Songs (Billboard)	1
Canada Hot 100 (Billboard)	47
Canada Country (Billboard)	3

=== Year-end charts ===
Chart (2008)	Position
US Country Songs (Billboard)	4

== Certifications ==
Region	Certification	Certified units/sales
United States (RIAA)	2× Platinum	2,000,000^{‡}
^{‡} Sales+streaming figures based on certification alone.
