= Come Back Song =

Single by Darius Rucker

from the album Charleston, SC 1966
- Released: July 6, 2010
- Genre: Country
- Length: 3:56
- Label: Capitol Nashville
- Songwriters: Darius Rucker; Chris Stapleton; Casey Beathard
- Producer: Frank Rogers

Darius Rucker singles chronology
"History in the Making" (2009)	"Come Back Song" (2010)	"This" (2010)

"Come Back Song" is a song recorded by American country music artist Darius Rucker. The song, co-written by Rucker and Nashville songwriters Casey Beathard and Chris Stapleton, was released to country music radio in July 2010 as the lead single from Rucker's second album of country music Charleston, SC 1966.

== Content ==
"Come Back Song" is a mid-tempo which features a narrator singing to his ex via radio and asking her to "come back." It is composed in the key of A major.

== Critical reception ==
"Come Back Song" has received mixed reviews from critics. Matt Bjorke of Roughstock gave the song 3.5 of 5 stars and called it "a strong, immediate hit." Bjorke would go on to say that the song would "generate buzz for his album with a sing-a-long lyric and jovial melody driving the way." Blake Boldt of Engine 145 gave the song a thumbs down saying "Come Back Song” is a custom-made Music Row production that's as ordinary as the songs that surround it on the airwaves." Boldt said "once Rucker sings his last “na-na”’s at the end, this weightless track has barely made a dent in your memory." Boldt also wrote that the song would allow Rucker to "savor another milestone or two."

== Music video ==
The music video was directed by Trey Fanjoy and premiered in mid-2010.

== Charts ==
=== Weekly charts ===
Chart (2010)	Peak position
US Billboard Hot 100	37
US Hot Country Songs (Billboard)	1
Canada Hot 100 (Billboard)	87
Canada Country (Billboard)	8

=== Year-end charts ===
Chart (2010)	Position
US Country Songs (Billboard)	9

== Certifications ==
Region	Certification	Certified units/sales
United States (RIAA)	2× Platinum	2,000,000^{‡}
^{‡} Sales+streaming figures based on certification alone.
