= Alright (Darius Rucker song) =

Single by Darius Rucker

from the album Learn to Live
- Released: April 20, 2009
- Genre: Country
- Length: 3:51
- Label: Capitol Nashville
- Songwriters: Frank Rogers; Darius Rucker
- Producer: Frank Rogers

Darius Rucker singles chronology
"It Won't Be Like This for Long" (2008)	"Alright" (2009)	"History in the Making" (2009)

Music video
- "Alright" on Vevo.com

"Alright" is a song co-written and recorded by American singer Darius Rucker, lead vocalist of the rock band Hootie & the Blowfish. It was released in April 2009 as the third single from his first country music album Learn to Live. Rucker co-wrote the song with producer Frank Rogers.

== Content ==
"Alright" is a mid-tempo in which the male narrator lists off the various pleasantries that he does not need, such as fancy food and wine. He then lists off what he does have, and says that he is "alright" because of it. Rucker wrote the song with Frank Rogers, who produced the album. The two had already written the song "All I Want," in which the divorced narrator wishes to be left alone; after writing that song, Rucker decided to invert the theme and write a song about a man who is happily married.

== Music video ==
A music video for the song debuted in June 2009. It is directed by Wayne Isham, who directed the videos for Rucker's previous two singles. Using various types of camera shots and angles, it features Rucker singing the song in various places in Venice, CA, sometimes within a crowd of people, and various depictions of everyday life. The video was voted in #34 on GAC's Top 50 Videos of the Year list.

== Critical reception ==
Dan Milliken of Country Universe gave the song a D rating. He criticized the song's theme, which he considered highly overused and "dumbed-down", but added that Rucker's vocals showed a sense of personality. Engine 145 reviewer Karlie Justus gave a thumbs-down rating, saying that the song is "a peppy piece of commercial fluff that will fare well on country radio. Unfortunately, despite the pervasive steel guitar, [Capitol Records executive Mike] Dungan is correct—it's a lot more Hootie and a lot less Haggard."

== Chart performance ==
"Alright" debuted at number 56 on the Hot Country Songs chart for the chart week of April 25, 2009. The song entered the Top 40 in its third chart week. The song has become Rucker's third consecutive Number 1 single on the country charts, as well as third consecutive solo Top 40 pop hit. With its ascent to Number 1, Rucker has become the first country music singer since Wynonna Judd to send his or her first three singles to the top of the country charts. It has sold 1,197,000 copies in the US as of May 2013.

Weekly chart performance
Chart (2009)	Peak position
US Billboard Hot 100	30
US Hot Country Songs (Billboard)	1
Canada Hot 100 (Billboard)	61
Canada Country (Billboard)	2

=== Year-end charts ===
Annual chart rankings
Chart (2009)	Position
US Country Songs (Billboard)	8
US Radio Songs (Billboard)	66

=== Certifications ===
Certifications for Alright
Region	Certification	Certified units/sales
New Zealand (RMNZ)	Gold	15,000^{‡}
United States (RIAA)	3× Platinum	3,000,000^{‡}
^{‡} Sales+streaming figures based on certification alone.
