= History in the Making (song) =

Single by Darius Rucker

from the album Learn to Live
- Released: September 8, 2009
- Genre: Country
- Length: 3:29
- Label: Capitol Nashville
- Songwriters: Clay Mills; Frank Rogers; Darius Rucker
- Producer: Frank Rogers

Darius Rucker singles chronology
"Alright" (2009)	"History in the Making" (2009)	"Come Back Song" (2010)

"History in the Making" is a song co-written and recorded by American country music artist Darius Rucker. Written along with Clay Mills and Frank Rogers, it was released in September 2009 as the fourth single from Rucker's album Learn to Live.

== Content ==
"History in the Making" is a song in which the male narrator addresses his new love, telling her that the beginning of their relationship could be a momentous occasion in their lives.

== Critical reception ==
Brittney McKenna of Engine 145 gave the song a thumbs-down review, calling the song "a formulaic but catchy little number about a relationship of 'historic' proportions." but describing Rucker's voice favorably. Matt Bjorke of Roughstock gave a more positive review, saying "The song really feels like it will become part of many wedding playlists" and referring to Rucker's vocal as "flawless [and] passionate."

== Music video ==
The music video was directed by Shane Drake and premiered in late 2009.

== Chart performance ==
"History in the Making" debuted at number 51 on the Hot Country Songs chart dated September 19, 2009. It also debuted at number 99 on the Billboard Hot 100 on the week ending November 7, 2009. It fell off the following week but re-entered at number 90 on the week ending November 21, 2009 and has since reached number 61. "History in the Making" peaked at number three on the country chart in February 2010, becoming Rucker's first single to miss number one.

Chart (2009–2010)	Peak position
US Billboard Hot 100	61
US Hot Country Songs (Billboard)	3
Canada Hot 100 (Billboard)	73
Canada Country (Billboard)	3

=== Year-end charts ===
Chart (2010)	Position
US Country Songs (Billboard)	24

== Certifications ==
Region	Certification	Certified units/sales
United States (RIAA)	Gold	500,000^{‡}
^{‡} Sales+streaming figures based on certification alone.
