= Darius Rucker =

American musician (born 1966)

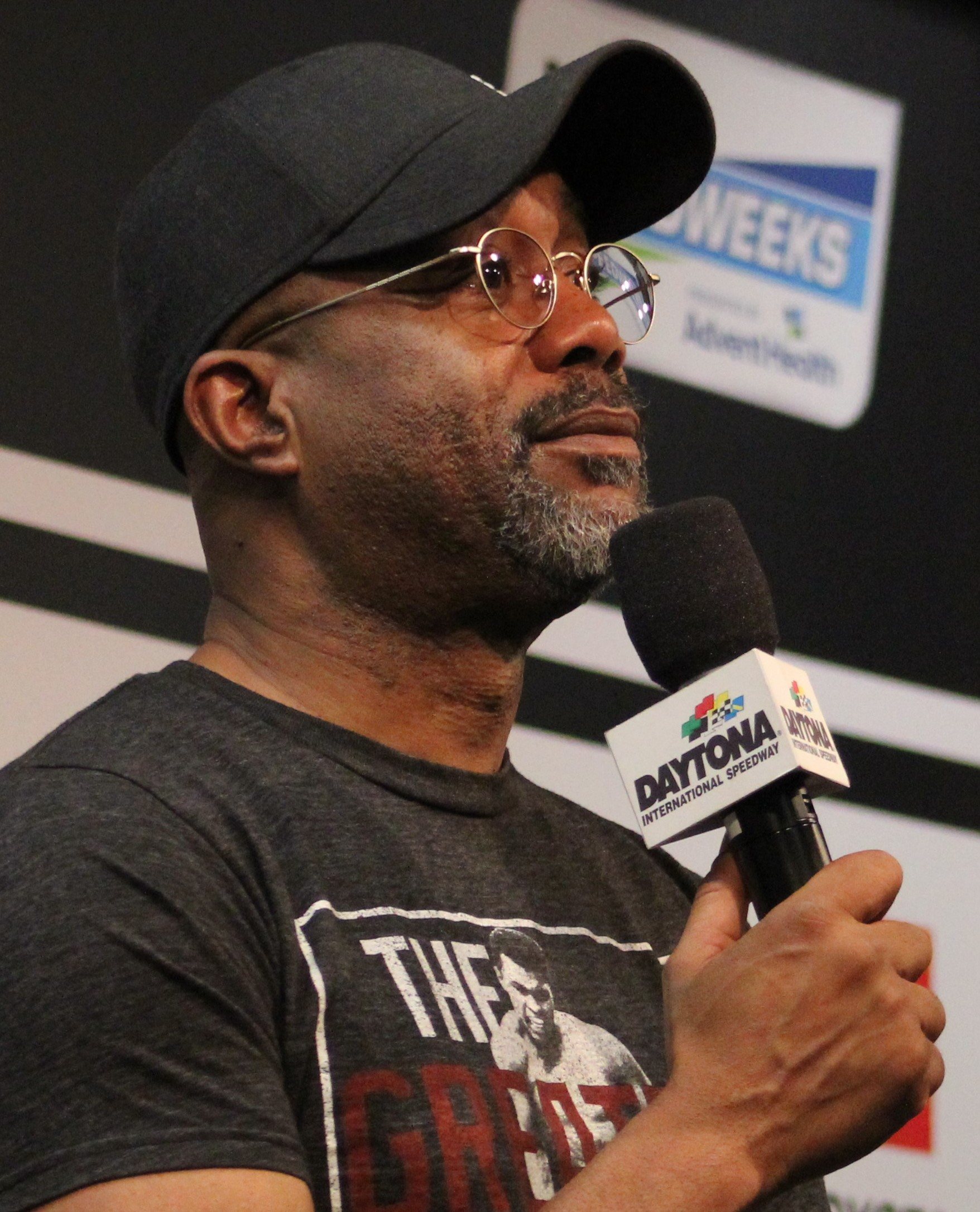
- Rucker at the Daytona International Speedway in Daytona Beach, Florida, 2020

Background information
- Born: Darius Carlos Rucker; May 13, 1966 (age 60); Charleston, South Carolina, U.S.
- Genres: Rock; pop; country; R&B; alternative rock
- Occupations: Singer; songwriter; musician
- Instruments: Vocals; guitar
- Years active: 1986–present
- Labels: Atlantic Records; Hidden Beach Recordings; Capitol Records Nashville
- Member of: Hootie & the Blowfish; Howl Owl Howl
- Spouse: Beth Leonard (m. 2000; div. 2020)

Darius Carlos Rucker (born May 13, 1966) is an American singer, musician, and songwriter. He first gained fame as the lead vocalist and rhythm guitarist of rock band Hootie & the Blowfish, which he founded in 1986 at the University of South Carolina along with Mark Bryan, Brantley Smith, and Dean Felber. The band released six studio albums with Rucker as a member and charted six top 40 hits on the Billboard Hot 100. Rucker co-wrote most of the songs with the other members of the band.

His debut studio album, an R&B record titled Back to Then (2002) was released through Hidden Beach Recordings. Six years later, Rucker signed to Capitol Nashville as a country singer and released his second album, Learn to Live (2008). Its first single, "Don't Think I Don't Think About It", peaked at number one on Hot Country Songs chart, making it the first song by a Black artist to do so since Charley Pride in 1983. It was followed by three similarly successful singles: "It Won't Be Like This for Long", "Alright", and "History in the Making".

In 2009, he became the first Black American to win the New Artist Award from the Country Music Association, and the second Black person to win any award from the association. His third album, Charleston, SC 1966, was released on October 12, 2010. The album included the number one country singles, "Come Back Song" and "This". His fourth album, True Believers (2013), reached number 2 on the Billboard 200, and spawned the singles "True Believers", "Wagon Wheel", and "Radio". His first country Christmas album, Home for the Holidays (2014) reached number 31 on the US Billboard 200. His sixth album, Southern Style (2014) reached number 6 on the Billboard 200, supported by the singles "Homegrown Honey" and "Southern Style". His seventh and eighth studio albums, When Was the Last Time (2017) and Carolyn's Boy (2023) followed thereafter. In 2025, he debuted a new supergroup, Howl Owl Howl.

== Early life ==
Rucker was born in Charleston, South Carolina and grew up with a single mother, Carolyn. His mother was a nurse at the Medical University of South Carolina in Charleston. He has three sisters and two brothers. According to him, his father was never around and he only saw him before church on Sundays. His father was in a gospel band called The Traveling Echoes. His family attended church every Sunday and was poor; at one point his mother, her two sisters, his grandmother and 14 children all lived in a 3-bedroom house. But Darius says that he looks back on his childhood with very fond memories. His sister, L'Corine, recalled that singing was always his dream.

== Hootie & the Blowfish ==
Darius Rucker was the lead singer of Hootie & the Blowfish since its formation in 1986. He met fellow band members Mark Bryan, Jim "Soni" Sonefeld, and Dean Felber while attending University of South Carolina. Bryan first heard Rucker singing in the shower, and the two became a duo, playing R.E.M. covers at a local venue. They later recruited Felber, and finally Sonefeld joined in 1989. As a member of Hootie & the Blowfish, Rucker has recorded seven studio albums: Cracked Rear View (1994), Fairweather Johnson (1996), Musical Chairs (1998), Scattered, Smothered and Covered (2000), Hootie & the Blowfish (2003), Looking for Lucky (2005) and Imperfect Circle (2019), and charted within the top 40 of the Billboard Hot 100 six times. Rucker, Bryan, Felber, and Sonefeld wrote the songs for all six albums. As the frontman, Rucker began to be called simply "Hootie" by fans, though the band title combines the nicknames of his college friends. Before his rise to fame, he lived in the basement of the Sigma Phi Epsilon house at the University of South Carolina, attempting to launch his career through the college bar scene.

Rucker's signature contribution to the band is his baritone voice, which Rolling Stone has called "ingratiating," Time says it is "low, gruff, [and] charismatic," and Entertainment Weekly has characterized it as having a "barrelhouse growl." Rucker said they "flipped" the formula of the all black band with a white frontman, like Frank Sinatra performing with Count Basie. Musically, Rucker has sometimes been criticized or spoofed for not being "black enough". Saturday Night Live ran a sketch of Tim Meadows playing Rucker leading beer-drinking, white fraternity members in a counter-march to Louis Farrakhan's Million Man March. Rucker received death threats for singing the Hootie song "Drowning," a protest song against the flying of the Confederate flag above the South Carolina statehouse.

Shortly after gaining a measure of fame, Felber and Rucker (who consider themselves best friends) moved into an apartment in Columbia, South Carolina. With Rucker's recognition as the frontman of a successful band came increased opportunities. In October 1995, he was asked to sing the national anthem at the World Series. Sinatra invited him to sing at his 80th birthday party; Rucker sang "The Lady Is a Tramp." That same week, he made a voice cameo in an episode of the NBC sitcom Friends. He also joined Nanci Griffith on the song "Gulf Coast Highway" for her 1997 album Blue Roses from the Moons, and sang backing vocals on Radney Foster's 1999 album See What You Want to See. He encouraged Atlantic Records to agree to a deal with Edwin McCain and made a guest appearance on McCain's debut album, Honor Among Thieves.

In regard to the future of Hootie & the Blowfish, Rucker was quoted by CBS News as stating in late 2011, "I don't think we'll ever break up totally. We're Hootie & the Blowfish... We'll make another record and do another tour someday. I don't know when, but it will happen. There's one more in us." After a 10-year hiatus, Rucker and the band announced that they would be touring with Barenaked Ladies in 2019 while also releasing an album later in 2019. Their sixth studio album Imperfect Circle was released on November 1, 2019.

== Solo career ==
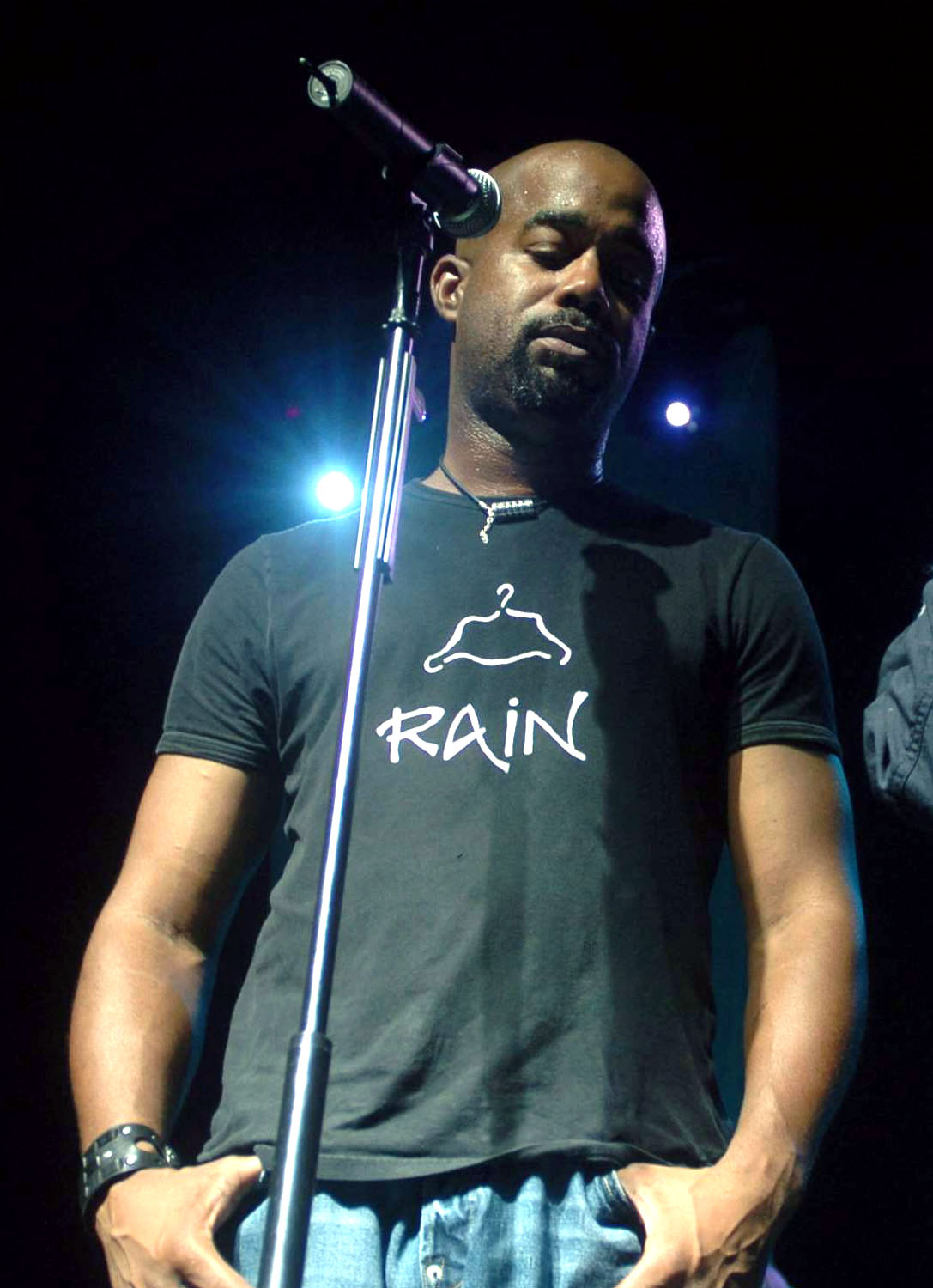
Rucker at Yokota Air Base in Fussa, Tokyo, May 2004

In 2001, he made his solo R&B debut album, The Return of Mongo Slade, for Atlantic Records. Because of contractual changes, it was never released by the label. Hidden Beach Recordings, an independent label, acquired the masters from Atlantic and released the album as Back to Then in July 2002. The album included work from the production team of Jill Scott, and she made an appearance on the track "Sometimes I Wonder." The single "This Is My World" was featured in the 2001 comedy film Shallow Hal. In regards to the album, "That was just a minute in my life," he later told The Arizona Republic about the record. "I was listening to a lot of Notorious B.I.G. and Lauryn Hill at that time, and I wanted to make a neo soul record." He also said in the article that he doesn't anticipate recording an R&B-styled disc again. "Country music is my day job now. I'll probably do this till it's all over, but that album was a lot of fun."

Rucker appeared on a pop-star edition of the quiz show Who Wants to Be a Millionaire? in July 2001. He also portrayed a singing cowboy in a television commercial for Burger King, promoting its TenderCrisp Bacon Cheddar Ranch sandwich in 2005. In the commercial, he sang a jingle set to the tune of "The Big Rock Candy Mountains". In 2006 he lent his voice to the track "God's Reasons" written by Dean Dinning and Joel A. Miller for the film The Still Life.

=== Country music ===
==== 2008–2009: Learn to Live ====
In early 2008, Rucker signed to Capitol Records Nashville beginning a career in country music. His first solo single, "Don't Think I Don't Think About It" (which he co-wrote with Clay Mills) debuted at No. 51 on the Billboard Hot Country Songs charts for the week of May 3, 2008. It is the first single from his second album, Learn to Live. For this album, Rucker worked with Frank Rogers, a record producer who has also produced for Brad Paisley and Trace Adkins. Rucker also made his Grand Ole Opry debut in July 2008. The single reached number one in September, making Rucker the first solo, African-American artist to chart a number one country hit since Charley Pride's "Night Games" in 1983.

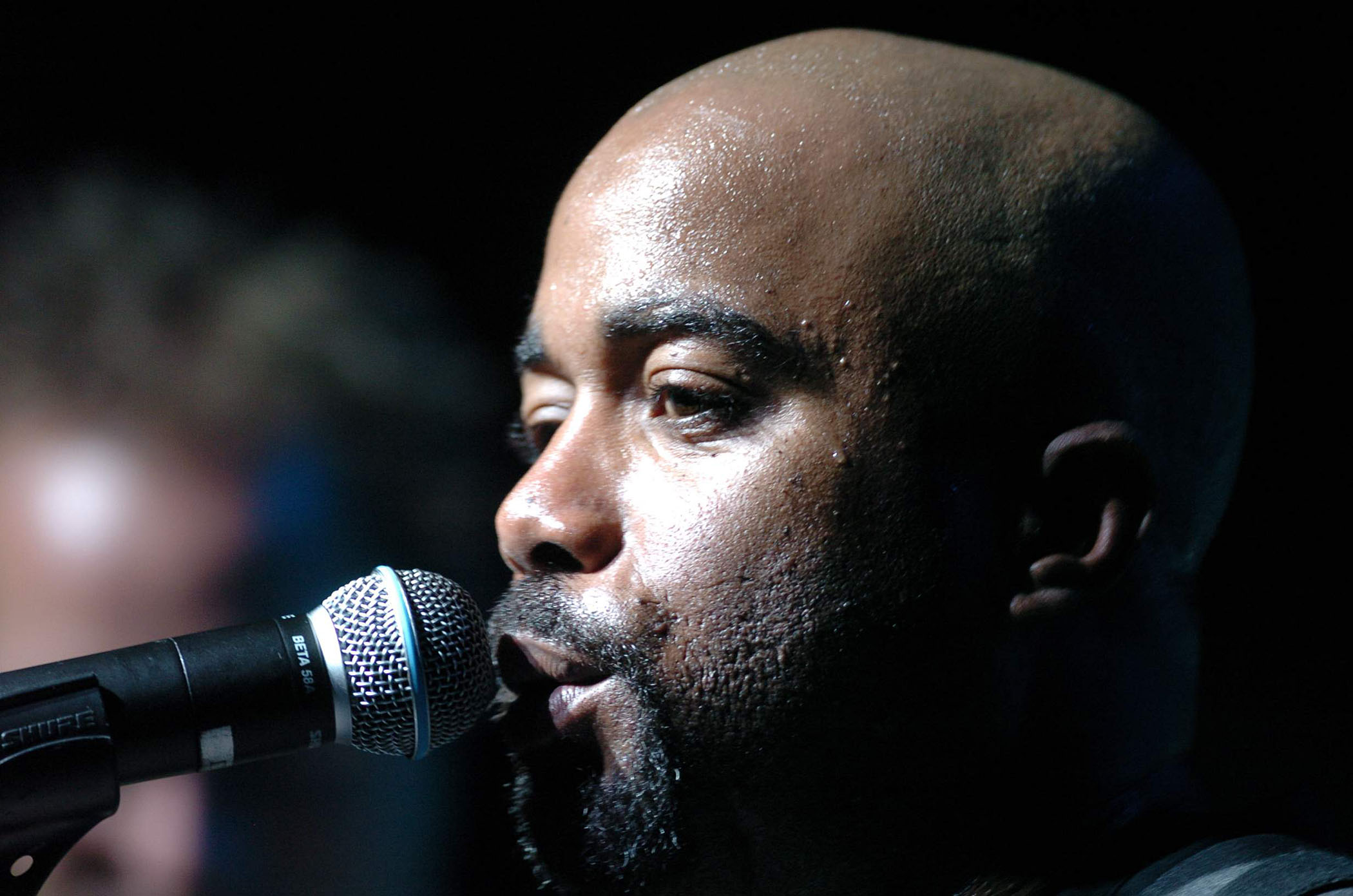
Rucker sings to a crowd during an Operation Pacific Greetings tour concert, May 2004

Learn to Live was certified gold by the Recording Industry Association of America (RIAA) on February 6, 2009, and received a platinum certification on August 7, 2009. The album's second single, "It Won't Be Like This for Long", spent three weeks at the top of the country chart in mid-2009. Its follow-up, "Alright", became Rucker's third straight No. 1 hit, making him the first singer to have his first three country singles reach No. 1 since Wynonna in 1992. The album's fourth single, "History in the Making" was released in September and peaked at No. 3. The singles also crossed over to the Billboard Hot 100, peaking at 35, 36, 30 and 61.

"You see a lot of people doing a one-off, saying, 'This is my country record.' But this is a career I'm trying to build. The people that say that they don't get it, I'll let the music speak for itself. I plan to do a lot of country records."

— Rucker, Billboard, 2008

Billboard magazine said that "there's a sense of purpose that makes Rucker feel like a member of the country family, rather than calculating interloper." Rucker made visits to various country stations around the United States, explaining that he was aware that he was the "new kid on the block." Mike Culotta, the program director of Tampa radio station WQYK-FM expected that Rucker would be "somebody who would have entitlement," but instead said that "Darius engaged everybody." When Rucker found that "Don't Think I Don't Think About It" went to number one, he cried. On November 11, 2009, Rucker won the Country Music Association New Artist of the Year award (formerly known as the Horizon Award), making him the first African American to do so since the award was introduced in 1981. Only one other African American has won at the CMAs: Charley Pride, who won entertainer of the year in 1971 and male vocalist in 1971 and 1972.

==== 2010–2011: Charleston, SC 1966 ====
Rucker released his second country album, Charleston, SC 1966, on October 12, 2010. The title is inspired by Radney Foster's solo debut album, Del Rio, TX 1959. Its first single was "Come Back Song," which Rucker wrote with Chris Stapleton and Casey Beathard. It was his fourth country number one as well as a No. 37 hit on the Hot 100. The album's second single was "This", which was released to radio in November 2010 and also reached No. 1 in the country chart. Rucker wrote it with Rogers and Kara DioGuardi. "I Got Nothin'" was the album's third single, peaking at No. 18. Also included on the album is a duet with Brad Paisley titled "I Don't Care". Charleston, SC 1966 received a gold certification.

==== 2012–2014: True Believers ====
On May 20, 2011, Rucker delivered the commencement address to the graduating class of the Medical University of South Carolina in Charleston. On December 14, 2011, CBSnews reported that Rucker was working on a third country album with recording set to begin January 2012 followed by the release of the album early in the year. The album's lead-off single, "True Believers," made its chart debut in September. On October 12, 2012, Rucker told Broadway's Electric Barnyard that his album would also be titled True Believers. "True Believers" peaked at No. 18. Its second single is a cover of Bob Dylan and Ketch Secor's "Wagon Wheel" (previously made famous by Old Crow Medicine Show), featuring backing vocals from Lady Antebellum. "Wagon Wheel" reached No. 1 on the Country Airplay chart in May 2013. True Believers was released on May 21, 2013. The album's third single, "Radio", was released to country radio on July 22, 2013. The album's fourth single, "Miss You", was released to country radio on February 3, 2014.

On October 2, 2012, Rucker was invited to join the Grand Ole Opry. Halfway through his set at the Opry that night he answered questions from the audience which included a question from Brad Paisley. Paisley said: "I have two questions. One, are you still the worst poker player in the world?... two, would you like to become the newest member of the Grand Ole Opry?" Rucker accepted and it became official on October 16.

Rucker was a featured performer at the C2C: Country to Country festival in London on March 17, 2013, which was headlined by Carrie Underwood. On New Year's Day 2013. he sang the national anthem at the Outback Bowl in Tampa. On May 11, 2013, Rucker was the speaker at the commencement ceremony for the University of South Carolina in Columbia. Before his speech, he received an honorary doctorate of music. He sang the national anthem at the NBA finals on June 16, 2013. On December 6, 2013, it was announced that Rucker's version of "Wagon Wheel" had earned him a nomination for Best Country Solo Performance for the 56th Annual Grammy Awards. At the awards ceremony on January 26, 2014, Rucker won, becoming only the third African American recording act (the first being Charley Pride, the second being The Pointer Sisters) to win a vocal performance Grammy Award in a country music category.

==== 2014–2015: Southern Style and Home for the Holidays ====
On August 25, 2014, Rucker released a new single titled "Homegrown Honey" to country radio and to digital retailers. It served as the lead single to his fourth country studio album, Southern Style, released on March 31, 2015. It reached No. 2 on the Country Airplay chart in April 2015. The album's second single, the title track, released to country radio on May 4, 2015.

On September 15, 2014, it was announced that Rucker had completed his first Christmas album and it would be released on October 27, 2014. Included is a collaboration with Sheryl Crow on "Baby, It's Cold Outside". On May 30, 2015, he headlined Philadelphia's famous XTU 31st Anniversary Show at the Susquehanna Bank Center. Christopher Bousquet was named the president of the Hootie fan club. Rucker performed on Sister Hazel's 2016 album, Lighter in the Dark.

==== 2016–present: When Was the Last Time and Carolyn's Boy ====
On January 6, 2016, Rucker announced that he was working on his fifth country album. The album's lead single, "If I Told You", was released to country radio on July 5, 2016. It reached No. 1 on the Country Airplay chart nearly a year later, and peaked at No. 4 on the Hot Country Chart. Rucker returned to the C2C: Country to Country festival in London in March 2017, where he was second on the bill to Reba McEntire.

On May 29, 2016, Rucker performed the national anthem prior to the 100th running of the Indianapolis 500. He also performed the national anthem for a game between the Buffalo Bills and the New York Jets on September 15. Rucker agreed to perform the song at the behest of personal friend and former Bills player Bruce Smith, whose jersey was being retired that night. Rucker sang the national anthem again ahead of the Saints-Dolphins game held at London's Wembley Stadium in October 2017, as part of the NFL International Series.

Rucker was selected as one of 30 artists to perform on "Forever Country", a mash-up track of "Take Me Home, Country Roads", "On the Road Again" and "I Will Always Love You", which celebrates 50 years of the CMA Awards. On July 24, 2017, Rucker released the second single from his upcoming album, titled "For the First Time." On July 26, 2017, he shared details of his fifth country album, titled When Was the Last Time and it was released on October 20, 2017. Rucker appeared as a mentor on seventeenth season of The Voice for Team Blake. He released Beers and Sunshine in August 2020 under Capitol Records, and released a "summer mix" version of the song in 2021. In 2021, Rucker performed a cover of the Metallica song "Nothing Else Matters" on the charity tribute album The Metallica Blacklist.

Rucker released a new single titled "Same Beer Different Problems" in April 2022. Later in 2022, he confirmed that he would be releasing a new album which would feature a collaboration with Chapel Hart. He subsequently announced that his seventh solo album, Carolyn's Boy, named after his mother, would be released in 2023. He featured on the single "To Be a Man" by Dax, a Canadian rapper from Ottawa, in October 2023.

On September 26, 2025 Rucker performed, at the Royal Albert Hall in London, to celebrate Opry 100, alongside Luke Combs, Carly Pearce, Ashley McBryde, and Marty Stuart. In 2025, Rucker, R.E.M. guitarist Mike Mills, and drummer Steve Gorman of the Black Crowes formed a supergroup called Howl Owl Howl, releasing the single "My Cologne."

== Golf ==
On November 7, 2016, Rucker told ESPN that he had become a partner in MGC Sports, a sports agency based in Columbia representing golfers (among them Steve Stricker and Kenny Perry), football players, and coaches. He added that he was planning to reduce his performance commitments from 100 dates per year to about 30, and that he thought his experience in the entertainment business would be an asset to potential clients. He will be able to work without restrictions for golfers, but because he is not registered with the NFL players' union, initially he will only be able to meet with NFL players under very limited circumstances.

Rucker has hosted the Darius Rucker Intercollegiate at Long Cove Club in Hilton Head since 2012. The three-day tournament annually hosts some of the top women's intercollegiate golf teams in the country.

== Personal life ==
Rucker is a fan of the South Carolina Gamecocks, Miami Dolphins, and Cincinnati Reds. His mother died in November 1992 of a heart attack. His grief inspired two Hootie & the Blowfish songs: "I'm Goin' Home" and "Not Even the Trees." On April 21, 1995, his girlfriend, Elizabeth Ann Phillips, gave birth to Rucker's first child, a daughter, Carolyn Pearl Phillips. Rucker and Beth Leonard married in 2000. Their daughter Daniela Rose, was born on May 16, 2001, and their son, Jack, on October 27, 2004. The Hootie song "Where Were You" is about Rucker's strained relationship with his father, and was released only in Europe, where he thought that his father would be unlikely to hear it. His country single "Alright" was inspired by his marriage. Rucker and his wife announced their divorce in 2020.

Rucker is a friend of Tiger Woods, whom he met in a bar in 1993 when Woods was 18. Rucker sang at Woods' wedding with Hootie & the Blowfish and at his father's funeral. His interest in golf goes well beyond his relationship with Woods; he was a VIP guest of Team USA at the 2016 Ryder Cup, and he attended Arnold Palmer's funeral shortly before the Cup. For the Undercover Boss series episode "Celebrity Undercover Boss: Darius Rucker", which premiered May 12, 2017, Rucker disguised himself as a 62-year-old music teacher, ran an open mic night, and worked as a roadie.

On February 1, 2024, Rucker was arrested in Williamson County, Tennessee, on two misdemeanor drug charges and a misdemeanor vehicle registration violation. He was released after posting $10,500 bail. In a statement given to The Tennessean, Rucker's lawyer Mark Puryear claimed that he was "fully cooperating with authorities related to the misdemeanor charges." In 2024 Rucker's memoir, Life's Too Short: A Memoir, written with Alan Eisenstock, was published by Dey Street/HarperCollins.

On January 29, 2025, Rucker revealed in an Instagram post that he would move to London to tour the United Kingdom and work on new creative endeavors. He had no plans to renounce his U.S. citizenship. Rucker announced his engagement to Emily Deahl on October 8, 2025. On March 25, 2026, he announced that he became co-owner of NASCAR Cup Series team Legacy Motor Club.

== Philanthropy and impact ==
Rucker has regularly worked with charities that support sick and underprivileged children, via benefit concerts, volunteering, the World Golf Foundation's The First Tee Program, and the Hootie & The Blowfish Foundation which has raised nearly $4.5 million to provide funding to public education systems throughout South Carolina.

He serves as a board member of the MUSC Shawn Jenkins Children's Hospital in Charleston, where his mother worked for over thirty years from the time Rucker was a child, and has helped raise millions of dollars to help build a new hospital. He also made a commitment to support St. Jude Children's Research Hospital after touring the facility in 2008. Since then, Rucker has spearheaded an annual event resulting in raising over $1.6 million for St. Jude's to date.

== Tours ==
Headlining

- Southern Style Tour (2015)
- Good for a Good Time (2016)
- Starting Fires Tour (2023)

Co-headlining

- Summer Plays on Tour (2018) with Lady Antebellum

Supporting

- H_{2}O II: Wetter and Wilder Tour with Brad Paisley (2012)
- Own the Night Tour with Lady Antebellum (2012)

== Discography ==
Studio albums

- Back to Then (2002)
- Learn to Live (2008)
- Charleston, SC 1966 (2010)
- True Believers (2013)
- Home for the Holidays (2014)
- Southern Style (2015)
- When Was the Last Time (2017)
- Carolyn's Boy (2023)

== Filmography ==
Year	Title	Notes
2001	Shallow Hal	Maitre'd
2016	Live from Daryl's House	with Daryl Hall in Charleston, SC
2017, 2023	CMT Crossroads	Along with John Mellencamp in March 2017 with Earth, Wind and Fire in June 2017 with The Black Crowes in May 2023
2019	The Voice	Season 17 for Team Blake
2019	Brad Paisley Thinks He's Special	Brad Paisley along with Kelsea Ballerini, Jonas Brothers, Peyton Manning, Tim McGraw, Carrie Underwood, Kimberly Williams-Paisley
2020	Country Music Association Awards	Along with Reba McEntire
2022	Rucker's Reno	About his renovation of a historic mansion in Charleston
2022	Big Sky	Episode: "Come Get Me"; plays the character of Possum

== Awards and nominations ==
Accolades for Darius Rucker
Year	Association	Category	Nominated work	Result
1995	Grammy Awards	Best New Artist	Hootie & The Blowfish	Won
1995	Grammy Awards	Best Pop Performance by a Duo or Group with Vocal	"Let Her Cry"	Won
2009	Country Music Association Awards	New Artist of the Year	Darius Rucker	Won
2009	Academy of Country Music Awards	Top Male Vocalist	Darius Rucker	Nominated
2009	American Music Awards	Favorite Country Male Artist	Darius Rucker	Nominated
2011	CMT Music Awards	CMT Performance of the Year	"Need You Now" (with Adele)	Nominated
2012	Country Music Association Awards	Musical Event of the Year	"Stuck on You" (with Lionel Richie)	Nominated
2013	Academy of Country Music Awards	Single Record of the Year	"Wagon Wheel"	Nominated
2013	Academy of Country Music Awards	Song of the Year	"Wagon Wheel"	Nominated
2013	Academy of Country Music Awards	Vocal Event of the Year (with Lady Antebellum)	"Wagon Wheel"	Nominated
2013	Country Music Association Awards	Single of the Year	"Wagon Wheel"	Nominated
2013	Grammy Awards	Best Country Solo Performance	"Wagon Wheel"	Won
2014	Billboard Music Awards	Top Country Song	"Wagon Wheel"	Nominated
2014	Billboard Music Awards	Top Country Artist	Darius Rucker	Nominated
2015	CMT Music Awards	Video of the Year	"Homegrown Honey"	Nominated
2016	CMT Music Awards	Performance of the Year	"Alright"	Nominated
2017	CMT Music Awards	Performance of the Year	"Pink Houses" (with John Mellencamp)	Nominated
2018	Academy of Country Music Awards	Gary Haber Lifting Lives Award	Darius Rucker	Won
2023	Country Music Association Awards	CMA Foundation Humanitarian Award	Darius Rucker	Won

In November 2023, it was announced that Rucker would get a star on the Hollywood Walk of Fame.
