= Frank Rogers (music producer) =

American record producer, songwriter, music publisher and session musician

- Born: Frank Mandeville Rogers V
- Origin: Florence, South Carolina, United States
- Genres: Country
- Occupations: Record producer, songwriter, session musician
- Instruments: Banjo, guitar
- Years active: 1999–present

Frank Mandeville Rogers V is an American record producer, songwriter, music publisher and session musician.

== Career ==
In 1990, Rogers moved to Nashville, attending Belmont University and graduating with a Music Business degree. While at Belmont, he met friend and future collaborator Brad Paisley. After graduation, Rogers went to work for EMI Nashville Productions, and started Sea Gayle Music Publishing with Paisley and Chris DuBois. The publishing company has over 300 cuts and 28 number one songs. The three business partners, in late 2009, also teamed up with Sony Nashville to form Sea Gayle Records, with a roster that includes Jerrod Niemann.

In 2016, Rogers founded Fluid Music Revolution, a venture with Spirit Music Group. Current writers include Justin Adams, Erik Belz, Ryan Creamer, Monty Criswell, Mike Fiorentino, Derek George, Palmer Lee, and Jason Lehning.

In 2018, Rogers was named CEO of Spirit Music Nashville.

Rogers has produced music for several country music performers since 1999, including Trace Adkins, Brad Paisley, Josh Turner, Hootie & the Blowfish lead singer Darius Rucker, Phil Vassar and Darryl Worley. His work has resulted in thirteen Country Music Association award nominations, with one win (for Album of the Year — Paisley's Time Well Wasted in 2006). Rogers has also received five Academy of Country Music awards (ACM), as well as Billboard magazine's #1 Hot Country Producer Award from 2006 to 2010 and Music Row magazine's Producer of the Year award in 2005, 2007, 2008 and 2009.

Frank's songwriting credits include number one songs: "I'm Gonna Miss Her (The Fishin' Song)" by Brad Paisley, "Five More Minutes" & "This Is It" (co-written by Aaron Eshuis) by Scotty McCreery, "Backroad Song" by Granger Smith, and "Alright" and "This" by Darius Rucker. Other singles that Rogers co-wrote include Paisley's "Who Needs Pictures" and "Me Neither," Rucker's "History in the Making," Trace Adkins' "Don't Lie" and "Swing," Steve Holy's "Don't Make Me Beg," "He Will, She Knows" by Kenny Rogers, and "Blow" by Ed Sheeran, Chris Stapleton and Bruno Mars.

== Songwriting credits ==
The following is a list with selected songs written by Frank Rogers and recorded by other artists.

Song	Year	Artist	Written with
You Time	2020	Scotty McCreery	Scotty McCreery, Aaron Eshuis
"Blow"	2019	Ed Sheeran, Chris Stapleton, Bruno Mars	Ed Sheeran, Chris Stapleton, Bard McNamee, Bruno Mars, Brody Brown, Gregory McKee, J.T. Cure
"This Is It"	2018	Scotty McCreery	Scotty McCreery, Aaron Eshuis
"Five More Minutes"	2017	Scotty McCreery	Monty Criswell
"Backroad Song"	2015	Granger Smith	Granger Smith
"This'	2010	Darius Rucker	Darius Rucker, Kara DioGuardi
"Alright"	2009	Darius Rucker	Darius Rucker
"I'm Gonna Miss Her (The Fishin' Song)"	2002	Brad Paisley	Brad Paisley

== #1 singles produced ==
The following is a list of #1 songs produced by Frank Rogers.

Song	Year	Artist
"He Didn't Have to Be"	1999	Brad Paisley
"We Danced"	2000	Brad Paisley
"I'm Gonna Miss Her (The Fishin' Song)"	2002	Brad Paisley
"Mud on the Tires"	2003	Brad Paisley
"The World"	2006	Brad Paisley
"She's Everything"	2006	Brad Paisley
"Letter to Me"	2007	Brad Paisley
"Ticks"	2007	Brad Paisley
"Online"	2007	Brad Paisley
"I'm Still a Guy"	2008	Brad Paisley
"Waitin' on a Woman"	2008	Brad Paisley
"Welcome to the Future"	2009	Brad Paisley
"American Saturday Night"	2009	Brad Paisley
"Water"	2010	Brad Paisley
"Anything Like Me"	2010	Brad Paisley
"Then"	2009	Brad Paisley
"When I Get Where I'm Going"	2005	Brad Paisley, Dolly Parton
"Start a Band"	2008	Brad Paisley, Keith Urban
"Remind Me"	2011	Brad Paisley, Carrie Underwood
"Old Alabama"	2011	Brad Paisley, Alabama
"Don't Think I Don't Think About It"	2011	Darius Rucker
"It Won't Be Like This for Long"	2008	Darius Rucker
"Alright"	2009	Darius Rucker
"Come Back Song"	2010	Darius Rucker
"This"	2010	Darius Rucker
"Wagon Wheel"	2013	Darius Rucker, Lady Antebellum
"Homegrown Honey"	2014	Darius Rucker
"I Miss My Friend"	2002	Darryl Worley
"Have You Forgotten?"	2003	Darryl Worley
"Awful, Beautiful Life"	2004	Darryl Worley
"Your Man"	2005	Josh Turner
"Would You Go with Me"	2006	Josh Turner
"Why Don't We Just Dance"	2009	Josh Turner
"All Over Me"	2010	Josh Turner
"In a Real Love"	2004	Phil Vassar
"Last Day of My Life"	2006	Phil Vassar
"Ladies Love Country Boys"	2006	Trace Adkins
"You're Gonna Miss This"	2008	Trace Adkins
"Backroad Song"	2015	Granger Smith
"Five More Minutes"	2017	Scotty McCreery
"This Is It"	2018	Scotty McCreery
"You Time"	2021	Scotty McCreery
