= Clear Impetuous Morning =

Album by the American band Jason & the Scorchers, released in 1996

Studio album by Jason & the Scorchers
- Released: 1996
- Label: Mammoth
- Producer: Warner Hodges, Jeff Johnson

Jason & the Scorchers chronology
Both Sides of the Line (1996)	Clear Impetuous Morning (1996)	Reckless Country Soul (1998)

Clear Impetuous Morning is an album by the American band Jason & the Scorchers, released in 1996. The band supported the album with a North American tour that included shows with Slobberbone. The band's second studio album after their reunion, it was also their last with bass player Jeff Johnson.

== Production ==
Produced by bandmembers Warner Hodges and Johnson, the album was recorded over three months at a friend's Nashville studio in an amp repair shop. Frontman Jason Ringenberg considered the recording sessions for Clear Impetuous Morning to be the easiest of the band's career. The band made more use of acoustic guitars than on previous albums, employing them on the majority of the songs. Songwriter Tommy Womack worked on some of the songs. Emmylou Harris sang on "Everything Has a Cost". "Drugstore Truck Drivin' Man" is a cover of the Gram Parsons song, which Jason considered to be "an anti-Nashville-music-business song." "Jeremy's Glory" is about the Civil War. "Going Nowhere" is about a woman who decides to leave her hometown.

== Critical reception ==
Professional ratings
Review scores
Source	Rating
AllMusic	3/5 stars
Entertainment Weekly	A
USA Today	3.5/4 stars

Entertainment Weekly wrote that "these country punkers once again prove themselves to be the only legitimate living incarnation of the Rolling Stones." The Ottawa Citizen determined that "the Scorchers' sound tends to fade into a generic blues boogie obscurity, alongside the likes of the Georgia Satellites." The Philadelphia Inquirer praised the "Hank Williams-meets-the-Sex-Pistols attack." USA Today allowed that the album could be the band's "finest work ever."

The Chicago Tribune concluded that the album "effectively meshes their past energy with a newfound slower-paced tunefulness." Stereo Review stated: "Driven by the relentless guitar of Warner Hodges and the impassioned vocals of Jason Ringenberg, the Scorchers uncork some of their fiercest material." The Sun Sentinel called the album "bristling with stinging licks and groove-a-licious tales of lovers, losers and loners." The Lincoln Journal Star and The Sunday Times listed Clear Impetuous Morning among the best albums of 1996.

== Track listing ==
No.	Title	Length
1.	"Self-Sabotage"
2.	"Cappuccino Rosie"
3.	"Drugstore Truck Drivin' Man"
4.	"Going Nowhere"
5.	"Uncertain Girl"
6.	"2 + 1 = Nothing"
7.	"Victory Road"
8.	"Kick Me Down"
9.	"Everything Has a Cost"
10.	"To Feel No Love"
11.	"Walking a Vanishing Line"
12.	"Tomorrow Has Come Today"
13.	"Jeremy's Glory"
14.	"I'm Sticking with You"
