= Wrapped in Sky =

Studio album by Drivin N Cryin
- Released: August 29, 1995
- Genre: Rock, folk rock
- Label: DGC
- Producer: John Porter

Drivin N Cryin chronology
Smoke (1993)	Wrapped in Sky (1995)	Drivin N Cryin (1997)

Wrapped in Sky is the sixth album by the American rock band Drivin N Cryin, released in 1995. The album marked a return to the band's earlier, folkier sound.

The band supported the album by touring with Moonpools & Caterpillars.

== Production ==
The album was produced by John Porter. Porter was not the band's first choice, but several "bigger name" producers had declined the band's invitation.

Peter Buck played dulcimer and mandolin on the album's opening tracks. It was recorded without guitar player Buren Fowler, who had quit the band in 1994.

== Critical reception ==
Professional ratings
Review scores
Source	Rating
AllMusic	4/5 stars
Calgary Herald	2/5 stars
Chicago Tribune	3/4 stars
The Encyclopedia of Popular Music	3/5 stars
Los Angeles Times	3/4 stars
MusicHound Rock: The Essential Album Guide	3/5 stars

No Depression wrote that "the songs run toward character sketches, conveyed at ballad tempo with careful restraint." Trouser Press determined that Wrapped in Sky captures the band's "broad stylistic ambitions better than on any other album," writing that "adjunct keyboardist Joey Huffman's textures are a valuable new contribution." The Calgary Herald concluded that the album "drifts by, pleasant but its purpose, its passion, its very drive somehow lost along the way." The Post and Courier labeled it "an album that often seems a dippy Dylanesque joke."

The Washington Post thought that, "though the songs are well-crafted and the sound is well realized ... the overall effect is not exactly organic." The Los Angeles Times stated that it "brims with music that's blissfully melodic (never cloying) and often quite fiery." The Sun-Sentinel conceded that, while singer Kevin Kinney "doesn't have one of the best voices around, he certainly has one of the most earnest." The Record lamented that "Kinney's wet-noodle vocals and high-falutin' lyrics tend to drag down his band's musical charms."

AllMusic called Wrapped in Sky "the most overlooked and underrated of the Southern rock band's albums," writing that "Saving Grace" "is an untraditional gem of a power ballad."

== Track listing ==
No.	Title	Length
1.	"Indian Song"
2.	"Telling Stories"
3.	"Leader the Follow"
4.	"Saving Grace"
5.	"Underground Umbrella"
6.	"Right Side of Town"
7.	"Señorita Louise"
8.	"Pura Vida"
9.	"Light"
10.	"Silence of Me"
11.	"Wrapped in Sky"
