= Mystery Road (album) =

Studio album by Drivin' N' Cryin'
- Released: March 28, 1989
- Recorded: 1988
- Studio: Soundscape, Atlanta, Georgia
- Genre: Southern rock; hard rock
- Length: 42:06
- Label: Island
- Producer: Scott McPherson; Kevn Kinney; Tim Nielsen

Drivin' N' Cryin' chronology
Whisper Tames the Lion (1987)	Mystery Road (1989)	Fly Me Courageous (1991)

Mystery Road is the third studio album by hard/Southern rock band Drivin' N' Cryin', released on March 28, 1989, by Island Records. The Washington Post said the album "remains a classic of the genre."

== Overview ==
Originally, R.E.M. guitarist Peter Buck, a friend of the band, was going to produce the album, and they recorded demos together. However, Island Records refused and chose Scott McPherson to produce.

Mystery Road "is like a map of late-'80s college radio, wandering from folky protest songs to crunch-heavy hard rock to warm, pseudo-country rock, with a little punk thrown in for good measure".

"Straight to Hell" is the band's most well-known song. Singer/guitarist Kevn Kinney said of the song:

It's just about a latchkey kid whose mother is dating and they have different rules. It's got a little bit of 'Romeo and Juliet' to it, but it's mostly about my sister's life, but it's also about everybody's life, that's why I think people identify so much with it.

"Honeysuckle Blue" was a "gorgeous Southern rock ballad that sounded like it should have been a big hit". Kinney recalled it was

a true story about a kid I saw outside the studio in New York begging on the streets. There was a time in the '80s when there were a lot of hotels where teenagers were squatting at. I was just wondering if he'd ever seen a mountain, you know?

On October 6, 2017, Mystery Road was reissued with the original Peter Buck demos as bonus tracks.

Darius Rucker's fifth album When Was the Last Time was released October 20, 2017, and featured a cover of "Straight to Hell" with guests Jason Aldean, Luke Bryan, and Charles Kelley. Darius said the song "was huge in my day—when it was played in the bar, every single person in the bar was singing and hugging their best friend".

== Reception ==
Professional ratings
Review scores
Source	Rating
AllMusic	2.5/5 stars
Red Dirt Report	5/5 stars

Denise Sullivan of AllMusic called Mystery Road the "least memorable record in the Drivin' n' Cryin' canon". Red Dirt Report's Andrew W. Griffin wrote of the reissue that "this new rerelease of a 28-year old album from Drivin' N' Cryin' is refreshing, primarily because we get to hear a band really starting to take off and become the band that refuses to throw in the towel all these years later".

== Track listing ==
All tracks are written by Drivin' N' Cryin'.

No.	Title	Length
1.	"Ain't it Strange"	3:54
2.	"Toy Never Played With"	3:39
3.	"Honeysuckle Blue"	4:50
4.	"With the People"	3:37
5.	"Wild Dog Moon"	5:23
6.	"House for Sale"	3:16
7.	"Peacemaker"	3:14
8.	"You Don't Know me"	3:34
9.	"Malfunction Junction"	3:39
10.	"Straight to Hell"	5:36
11.	"Syllables"	1:24

== Personnel ==
The following people contributed to Mystery Road:

Drivin' N Cryin'

- Kevn Kinney – lead vocals, electric and acoustic guitars
- Buren Fowler – guitars, Dobro
- Tim Nielsen – bass, backing vocals, percussion
- Jeff Sullivan – drums, backing vocals, percussion

Additional personnel

- Scott MacPherson – acoustic guitar, 12-string guitar
- Edd Miller – banjo
- Randy DeLay – drums
- Peter Buck – electric dulcimer
- Mikel Kinney – fiddle
- Gary Nielsen – Hammond B-3 organ
- Michelle Malone – vocals
- Kevn Kinney, Scott MacPherson, Tim Nielsen – producer
- Dan Vaganek, Edd Miller – assistant engineer
- Scott MacPherson – recorder, mixer
- Norma Kinney – paintings

== See also ==
- MacDougal Blues, a 1990 Kevn Kinney solo album that features members of Drivin' 'n Cryin'
