= The Great American Bubble Factory =

Studio album by Drivin N Cryin
- Released: September 29, 2009
- Genre: Southern rock, hard rock
- Label: Vintage Earth

Drivin N Cryin chronology
Detroit City Rock (EP) (2003)	The Great American Bubble Factory (2009)	Songs From The Laundromat (EP) (2012)

The Great American Bubble Factory is the eighth full studio album from Southern rock group Drivin N Cryin. Released on September 29, 2009, on Vintage Earth records, it was the band's first studio album in 12 years. Three of the album's songs, "Midwestern Blues," "Pre-Approved, Pre-Denied" and "This Town" had previously appeared on Kevn Kinney solo albums (released in 1994, 2009 and 2000, respectively).

The vinyl version of the album was split into three sides, with the fourth side featuring three bonus tracks: "Take Me Out," "In The Drift Of Time," and a cover of the Beatles "Let It Be."

== Reception ==
Stephen M. Deusner of The Washington Post notes a few issues, such as "some stumbling social commentary and a regrettable album cover" but finds the album also "both a welcome return as well as a return to form for Drivin' N' Cryin'". At times, "the album reverberates with an energy that the group hasn't mustered since 1991's Fly Me Courageous."

Mark Deming of AllMusic states that Kinney's voice is "starting to show its age ... but for a band that was formed in 1985 and has been off the radar for over a decade, Drivin' n' Cryin' sound admirably vital and committed."

== Track list ==
No.	Title	Writer(s)	Length
1.	"Detroit City"	Carter, Johnson, Kinney, Nielsen	4:34
2.	"(Whatever Happened to The) Great American Bubble Factory?"	Carter, Johnson, Kinney, Nielsen	3:33
3.	"I See Georgia"	Carter, Johnson, Kinney, Nielsen	6:02
4.	"Midwestern Blues"	Kinney	4:19
5.	"Let Me Down"	Carter, Johnson, Kinney, Nielsen	4:39
6.	"I Stand Tall"	Shernoff	4:21
7.	"Don't You Know That I Know That You Know?"	Carter, Johnson, Kinney, Nielsen	4:01
8.	"Get Around Kid"	Carter, Johnson, Kinney, Nielsen	2:03
9.	"Preapproved, Predenied"	Kinney	4:51
10.	"The Hardest Part"	Carter, Johnson, Kinney, Nielsen	4:49
11.	"Trainwreck"	Carter, Johnson, Kinney, Nielsen	4:08
12.	"This Town"	Kinney	5:19
