= When Was the Last Time =

Studio album by Darius Rucker
- Released: October 20, 2017
- Studios: Southern Ground (Nashville); Ocean Way (Nashville); The Red Room (Nashville); Charleston Sound (Charleston); Island Sound (Honolulu); Zach's Studio (Nashville); Legends (Nashville); The Cave East (Nashville); The Home Studio (Carthage); Sound Emporium (Nashville)
- Genre: Country
- Length: 48:49
- Label: Capitol Nashville
- Producer: Ross Copperman

Darius Rucker chronology
Southern Style (2015)	When Was the Last Time (2017)	Carolyn's Boy (2023)

Singles from When Was the Last Time
- 1. "If I Told You" Released: July 5, 2016; 2. "For the First Time" Released: July 24, 2017; 3. "Straight to Hell" Released: June 25, 2018

Professional ratings
Review scores
Source	Rating
AllMusic	3/5 stars

When Was the Last Time is the seventh studio album and fifth in the country genre by American country music singer Darius Rucker. It was released on Capitol Records Nashville on October 20, 2017.

== Content ==
"If I Told You" was released as the album's lead single on July 5, 2016. It reached No. 1 on the Billboard Country Airplay chart dated June 24, 2017, becoming his first No. 1 since "Wagon Wheel" in 2013. The album's second single, "For the First Time", was released on July 24, 2017. It reached number one on the Billboard Country Airplay chart dated June 2, 2018.

"Straight to Hell", which features guest vocals from Jason Aldean, Luke Bryan, and Charles Kelley, was previously recorded by Drivin' N' Cryin' on their 1989 album Mystery Road. This song was released as the album's third single on June 25, 2018.

== Critical reception ==
Stephen Thomas Erlewine of AllMusic rated the album 3 out of 5 stars, saying that "not much separates" it from Rucker's previous country albums, but noting the vocal performances on "Story to Tell" and "Another Night with You" while calling "Straight to Hell" the "rowdiest country he's ever done".

== Commercial performance ==
On its debut week, the album charted at No. 8 on the US Billboard 200, which is Rucker's fifth top 10 album on the chart. It also debuted at No. 2 on the Top Country Albums chart, with 30,000 copies sold in the first week, 34,000 units, including track sales and streams. In its second week, it sold a further 9,300 copies. It has sold 123,400 copies in the United States as of April 2019.

== Track listing ==
When Was the Last Time track listing
No.	Title	Writer(s)	Length
1.	"For the First Time"	Darius Rucker; Derek George; Scooter Carusoe	3:17
2.	"Bring It On"	Ross Copperman; Ashley Gorley; Dallas Davidson	3:13
3.	"Life's Too Short"	Copperman; Jaren Johnston; Jon Nite	3:35
4.	"If I Told You"	Copperman; Nite; Shane McAnally	3:32
5.	"Don't"	Adam Doleac; A. J. Babcock; Pete Good	3:54
6.	"Twenty Something"	McAnally; Zach Crowell; Josh Osborne; Nite	3:10
7.	"Straight to Hell" (featuring Jason Aldean, Luke Bryan, and Charles Kelley)	Kevn Kinney	4:13
8.	"Count the Beers"	Rucker; Josh Thompson; Dean Dillon	3:27
9.	"Another Night with You"	Rucker; Dillon; Thompson	2:59
10.	"Hands on Me"	Copperman; J.T. Harding; McAnally	3:43
11.	"She"	Chris Tompkins; Rodney Clawson	4:53
12.	"Story to Tell"	Rucker; Copperman; Gorley	3:17
Total length:			43:18

Digital/Streaming Bonus Track
No.	Title	Writer(s)	Length
13.	"Straight to Hell (Full Length Version)" (featuring Jason Aldean, Luke Bryan, and Charles Kelley)	Kinney	5:35
Total length:			48:53

== Personnel ==
Credits adapted from the album's liner notes and Tidal.

=== Musicians ===
- Darius Rucker – lead vocals
- Fred Eltringham – drums
- Tony Lucido – bass
- Derek Wells – acoustic guitar (tracks 1–4, 7, 9, 11, 13), electric guitar (1–4, 7, 9, 11), banjo (11)
- Rob McNelley – electric guitar (tracks 5, 6, 8, 10, 12), acoustic guitar (5, 6, 10)
- Dan Dugmore – pedal steel guitar (tracks 1–6, 9–12), electric guitar (2–4, 7–9, 11, 13), acoustic guitar (2–5, 11, 12), mandolin (6), lap steel guitar (8)
- Jason Lehning – keyboards
- Stuart Duncan – fiddle (tracks 1, 7, 13)
- Andy Leftwich – fiddle (track 8)
- Zach Crowell – programming (track 6)
- Chris Tompkins – electric guitar, programming (track 11)
- Ross Copperman – electric guitar (tracks 2–4, 9, 10); acoustic guitar, keyboards, programming (2, 4, 10, 12); background vocals (4, 7, 8, 10, 13)
- Derek George – acoustic guitar, background vocals, programming (track 1)
- Rodney Clawson – acoustic guitar, background vocals (track 11)
- Jason Aldean – lead vocals, background vocals (tracks 7, 13)
- Luke Bryan – lead vocals, background vocals (tracks 7, 13)
- Perry Coleman – background vocals (track 11)
- Carolyn Dawn Johnson – background vocals (tracks 7–9, 13)
- Jaren Johnston – background vocals (track 3)
- Charles Kelley – lead vocals, background vocals (tracks 7, 13)
- Josh Osborne – background vocals (track 6)
- Micah Wilshire – background vocals (tracks 4, 5, 10)
- Bergen White – string arrangement, conducting (track 9)
- Conni Ellisor – violin (track 9)
- Mary Katherine Vanosdale – violin (track 9)
- Alan Umstead – violin (track 9)
- David Davidson – violin (track 9)
- James Grosjean – viola (track 9)
- Elizabeth Lamb – viola (track 9)
- Carole Rabinowitz – cello (track 9)

=== Technical ===
- Ross Copperman – production, overdub recording, vocal recording
- F. Reid Shippen – recording, mixing
- Chris Taylor – recording assistance (tracks 1–4, 7, 9, 11, 13)
- Josh Ditty – recording assistance (tracks 5, 6, 8, 10, 12)
- Mike Shear – overdub and vocal recording assistance (tracks 1–4, 7, 9, 11, 13)
- Gaylord Holomalia – overdub and vocal recording assistance (tracks 5, 6, 8, 12)
- Zach Crowell – additional recording (track 6)
- Dan Frizsell – additional recording (track 11)
- Brent Truitt – additional recording (tracks 7, 13)
- Andy Leftwich – additional recording (track 8)
- Kyle Lehning – strings recording (track 9)
- Mike Stankiewicz – strings recording assistance (track 9)
- Chris Parr – vocal production assistance
- Daniel Bacigalupi – mixing assistance
- Brian David Willis – digital editing
- Buckley Miller – digital editing (tracks 5, 6, 8, 10, 12)
- Scott Johnson – production assistance
- Andrew Mendelson – mastering

=== Visuals ===
- Karen Naff – art direction
- Craig Allen – design
- David McClister – photography
- Lindsay Doyle – groomer
- Anna Redmon – wardrobe stylist

== Chart performance ==
=== Weekly charts ===
Chart (2017)	Peak position
Australian Albums (ARIA)	29
Canadian Albums (Billboard)	42
US Billboard 200	8
US Top Country Albums (Billboard)	2

=== Year-end charts ===
Chart (2017)	Position
US Top Country Albums (Billboard)	76
Chart (2018)	Position
US Top Country Albums (Billboard)	50

== Certifications ==
Region	Certification	Certified units/sales
United States (RIAA)	Gold	500,000^{‡}
^{‡} Sales+streaming figures based on certification alone.
