= Lost & Found (Jason & the Scorchers album) =

Studio album by Jason & the Scorchers
- Released: 1985
- Genres: Country punk, alternative country
- Label: EMI America

Jason & the Scorchers chronology
Fervor EP (1983)	Lost & Found (1985)	Still Standing (1986)

Lost and Found is the debut album by Jason & the Scorchers, released in 1985. Released by EMI America, the album is regarded as the band's best.

== Music ==
Fusing elements of punk rock and country music, Lost & Found is considered by some to be ahead of its time. According to Paste, "It’s a punk rock album at heart, but guitarist Warner Hodges has plenty of twangy licks up his sleeve."

== Reception ==
Professional ratings
Review scores
Source	Rating
AllMusic	4.5/5 stars
Robert Christgau	B+
The Virgin Encyclopedia of Eighties Music	3/5 stars

AllMusic's Mark Deming called Lost & Found "the best record this fine band would ever make." No Depression also viewed it as the band's best. Billboard called it "ragged but righteous. Trouser Press wrote that "more than just a pedigree to brag about, the band’s genuine hick beginnings make them a lot less inhibited and more apt to cross from cool to corny, punk to heavy metal without fretting much about it."

The band made a music video for "White Lies," which got regular airplay on MTV in the 1980s.

== Track listing ==
Side one

1. "Last Time Around" – 3:06 (Ringenberg, Baggs, Johnson, Hodges)
2. "White Lies" – 3:19 (Baggs, Napier)
3. "If Money Talks" – 2:33 (Baggs, Napier)
4. "I Really Don't Want to Know" – 4:29 (Don Robertson, Howard Barnes)
5. "Blanket of Sorrow" – 2:19 (Ringenberg)
6. "Shop It Around" – 2:58 (Ringenberg)

Side two

1. "Lost Highway" – 2:00 (Payne)
2. "Still Tied" – 3:20 (Ringenberg)
3. "Broken Whiskey Glass" – 3:50 (Ringenberg)
4. "Far Behind" – 3:50 (Johnson, Baggs)
5. "Change the Tune" – 2:39 (Johnson, Ringenberg)

== Charts ==
Chart (1985)	Peak position
Australia (Kent Music Report)	86
US Billboard 200	96

== Personnel ==
- Jason Ringenberg – vocals, harmonica, acoustic guitar
- Warner Hodges – electric guitar, acoustic guitar, mandolin, steel guitar, Nashville high string acoustic
- Perry Baggs – drums, vocals
- Jeff Johnson – bass guitar, acoustic guitar, vocals

Technical

- Terry Manning – producer
- Warner Hodges – associate producer
- Jeff Johnson – associate producer
- R. Eli Ball – executive producer
