= White Lies (Jason & the Scorchers song) =

Single by Jason & the Scorchers

from the album Lost and Found
- B-side: "Are You Ready For The Country"; "Honky Tonk Blues"
- Released: 1985
- Genre: Rock
- Label: EMI America (12EA 192)

Jason & the Scorchers singles chronology
"'Fervor EP'" (1983)	"White Lies" (1985)	"'Still Standing'" (1986)

"White Lies" is a single by Jason & the Scorchers. Produced by Terry Manning, it was the second track on their 1985 album, Lost & Found. "White Lies" was released by EMI America, on 12-inch vinyl.

The B-side, "Are You Ready for the Country", is a cover of a Neil Young song.

== Track listing ==
A1. "White Lies"
B1. "Are You Ready for the Country"
B2. "Honky Tonk Blues"
