= Straight to Hell (Drivin N Cryin song) =

1989 song by Drivin N Cryin

Single by Drivin N Cryin

from the album Mystery Road
- Released: 1989
- Genre: Southern rock
- Length: 5:36
- Label: Island
- Songwriter: Kevn Kinney
- Producers: Scott McPherson; Kevn Kinney; Tim Nielsen

Drivin N Cryin singles chronology
"Can't Promise You the World" (1988)	"Straight to Hell" (1989)	"Honeysuckle Blue" (1989)

"Straight to Hell" is a song by American Southern rock band Drivin N Cryin, from their 1989 album, Mystery Road. In 2014, a cover version appeared as the last track on the album Cherlene, an Archer tie-in sung by Jessy Lynn Martens as fictional character Cheryl Tunt. In 2018, American country music singer Darius Rucker released a cover version as the third single from his album When Was the Last Time.

== Content ==
Writer and band member Kevn Kinney said of the song, "It's just about a latchkey kid whose mother is dating and they have different rules. It's got a little bit of 'Romeo and Juliet' to it, but it's mostly about my sister's life, but it's also about everybody's life, that's why I think people identify so much with it."

== Track listing ==
No.	Title	Writer(s)	Length
1.	"Straight to Hell"	Kevn Kinney	5:36
2.	"Catch the Wind"	Kevn Kinney, Buren Fowler, Tim Nielsen, Jeff Sullivan	4:02

== Darius Rucker version ==
"Straight to Hell"

Single by Darius Rucker featuring Jason Aldean, Luke Bryan, and Charles Kelley

from the album When Was the Last Time
- Released: June 25, 2018
- Genre: Country
- Length: 5:35 (album version); 4:13 (radio edit)
- Label: Capitol Nashville
- Songwriter: Kevn Kinney
- Producer: Ross Copperman

Darius Rucker singles chronology
"For the First Time" (2017)	"Straight to Hell" (2018)	"Beers and Sunshine" (2020)

In 2017, country musician Darius Rucker recorded the song for his album When Was the Last Time. Rucker's version features guest vocals from Jason Aldean, Luke Bryan, and Lady Antebellum co-lead vocalist Charles Kelley.

Rucker said that he chose to record the track because he had noticed the positive reaction it got when he first began his musical career and sang the song in bars. He was encouraged to record it after Kelley called Rucker, suggesting that he record the song and include Kelley on guest vocals. Rucker's version features an arrangement that is softer and more influenced by country music than the original.

=== Charts ===
Chart (2018)	Peak position
US Country Airplay (Billboard)	40

== Certifications ==
Region	Certification	Certified units/sales
United States (RIAA)	Gold	500,000^{‡}
^{‡} Sales+streaming figures based on certification alone.
