= Feels So Right (disambiguation) =

Feels So Right is a 1981 studio album by the band Alabama, or its title track (see below).

Feels So Right may also refer to:

- "Feels So Right" (song), a song by Alabama from the album of the same name
- Feels So Right (Brenda Lee album), 1985
- "Feels So Right", a song by Betzefer from the 2011 album Freedom to the Slave Makers
- "Feels So Right", a song by Eagle-Eye Cherry from a 2001 reissue of Living in the Present Future
- "Feels So Right", a song by Insane Clown Posse from the 2005 album Forgotten Freshness Volume 4
- "Feels So Right", a song by Janet Jackson from the 2001 album All for You
- "Feels So Right", a song by Jason Ringenberg from the 1992 album One Foot in the Honky Tonk
- "Feels So Right", a song by Krystal Meyers from the 2008 album Make Some Noise
- "Feels So Right", a song by Lloyd from the 2004 album Southside
- "Feels So Right", a song by Matt Wertz from the 2011 album Weights & Wings
- "Feels So Right", a song by Monique Brumby from the 2010 album Skeletons' Polka
- "Feels So Right", a 2014 song by Bogi (singer)
- "Feels So Right", a 2010 song by Griffin House (musician)
- "Feels So Right", a 2015 song by Gunther Göbbel
- "Feels So Right", a 2023 song by Moonstar88
- "Feels So Right", a 1992 song by Thomas Lang (singer)
- "Feels So Right", a 1999 album by Jamie Rivera
- Feels So Right Tour, a 1990 concert tour by Whitney Houston

== See also ==
- "Feel So Right", a 2001 song by MAX
- "It Feels So Right", a 1965 song recorded by Elvis Presley
- "She Feels So Right (I Feel So Wrong)", a 1983 song by Ronnie Dove
- What Feels So Right, a 2004 album by Rick Recht
- "Wrong Feels So Right", a song by Carly Rae Jepsen from the deluxe version of the 2012 album Kiss
