= Whisper Tames the Lion =

Studio album by Drivin' n' Cryin'
- Released: 1988
- Studios: RPM, New York City
- Genres: Hard rock; folk; heavy metal
- Length: 43:40
- Label: Island
- Producer: Anton Fier

Drivin' n' Cryin' chronology
| Scarred but Smarter (1986) | Whisper Tames the Lion (1988) | Mystery Road (1989) |

Whisper Tames the Lion is the second album by the American band Drivin' n' Cryin', released in 1988. "Powerhouse" was released as single. The band supported the album with a North American tour. The album peaked at No. 130 on the Billboard 200. It sold more than 70,000 copies in its first year of release.

== Production ==
Recorded in New York City, the album was produced by Anton Fier. Jeff Sullivan joined the band on drums, although Fier drummed on most of the tracks. Frontman Kevn Kinney considered the band's sound to be an amalgamation of styles but described himself as a folk singer. "Check Your Tears at the Door" is narrated by a recently deceased young man. Bernie Worrell played keyboards on "Good Day Every Day". "On a Clear Daze" employed acoustic guitar and mandolin.

== Critical reception ==
Professional ratings
Review scores
| Source | Rating |
|---|---|
| AllMusic | 4/5 stars |
| MusicHound Rock: The Essential Album Guide | 3/5 stars |
| The Rolling Stone Album Guide | 3.5/5 stars |

Trouser Press wrote that the album "focuses the trio's musical attack while maintaining the polystylistic approach." The Orlando Sentinel noted: "Call it eclecticism, diversity or simply musical schizophrenia, but this album veers from one extreme to the other throughout." The Atlanta Constitution opined that "there are a few overproduced tracks ... and a few glutinous violins ... [but the album] hews mostly to the band's unadorned strengths."

The State concluded that "Catch the Wind" "is the best Byrds song Roger McGuinn never wrote." LA Weekly determined that Whisper Tames the Lion "points new directions in backward-looking alterno-pop." The Morning Call panned "the combination of heavy metal and folk music." The North Bay Nugget determined that the band "bring a respectability to heavy rock that has been missing since the mid-Seventies."

AllMusic wrote that the band was "still inflected with hillbilly/bluegrass roots and edging ever closer toward the hard rock sound they would ultimately embrace."

== Track listing ==
All tracks are written by Drivin' n' Cryin'.

| No. | Title | Length |
|---|---|---|
| 1. | "The Whisper Tames the Lion" | 3:50 |
| 2. | "Catch the Wind" | 4:02 |
| 3. | "Powerhouse" | 3:33 |
| 4. | "The Friend Song" | 4:11 |
| 5. | "On a Clear Daze" | 2:30 |
| 6. | "Ridin' on the Soul Road" | 4:50 |
| 7. | "Can't Promise You the World" | 2:56 |
| 8. | "Livin' by the Book" | 2:33 |
| 9. | "Good Day Every Day" | 2:39 |
| 10. | "Legal Gun" | 3:44 |
| 11. | "Check Your Tears at the Door" | 5:08 |
| 12. | "Blue Ridge Way" | 3:44 |

== Personnel ==
Drivin' n' Cryin'

- Kevn Kinney – lead vocals, guitar
- Tim Nielsen – bass, backing vocals, mandolin
- Jeff Sullivan – drums

Additional musicians

- Anton Fier – drums
- Fats Kaplin – accordion, pedal steel guitar, acoustic guitar
- Larry Saltzman – acoustic guitar
- Bernie Worrell – Hammond organ, piano
- Irwin Fisch – piano, string arrangements (track 12)
- Ann Barak – violin (track 12)
- Eugene Moye – violin (track 12)
- Regis Iandioro – violin (track 12)
- Richard Henrickson – cello (track 12)

Production

- Anton Fier – producer
- "Iron" Mike Krowiak – recording, mixing
- Jeff Smith – assistant engineer
- Greg Calbi – mastering
