= A Blazing Grace =

Studio album by Jason & the Scorchers
- Released: 1995
- Studio: Castle
- Label: Mammoth
- Producer: Jason & the Scorchers

Jason & the Scorchers chronology
Essential Jason & the Scorchers – Are You Ready for the Country? (1992)	A Blazing Grace (1995)	Both Sides of the Line (1996)

A Blazing Grace is an album by the American band Jason & the Scorchers, released in 1995 on Mammoth Records. The initial album title was Men and Women, War and Peace. The band supported the album with a North American tour. The first single, "Take Me Home, Country Roads", was a modest radio hit.

== Production ==
The album marked a reunion of the band's original lineup; the band, in part, recorded the album as an excuse to play live and tour. Produced by the band, A Blazing Grace was recorded at Castle Recording Studio, in Nashville. All of the band members were struggling with personal issues, and regarded the offer of free studio time as a blessing.

"Why Baby Why" is a cover of the George Jones song; "Take Me Home, Country Roads" is a cover of the John Denver song. The band initially intended the cover songs to be b-sides. "Somewhere Within" was Jason Ringenberg's favorite composition.

== Critical reception ==
Professional ratings
Review scores
Source	Rating
The Encyclopedia of Popular Music	3/5 stars
The Indianapolis Star	3/4 stars
MusicHound Rock: The Essential Album Guide	3.5/5 stars
Vancouver Sun	1/4 stars

Newsday wrote that "Ringenberg's high-lonesome tone has always lent itself to balladeering, and it might be a mark of age and experience that a couple of the album's best songs gear down to make breathing room for heartfelt expression." The Indianapolis Star noted that "the Scorchers haven't lost one iota of supercharged twang." The Washington Post determined that Ringenberg "attacks the [songs] as if he were leading the Ramones at the Grand Ole Opry."

Don McLeese, of the Austin American-Statesman, opined: "Though I once considered the Scorchers the great lost American rock band of the '80s, the band has regrouped with a 1995 album that is arguably its best—and is likely to rank with the year's best as well." Guitar Player deemed guitarist Warner Hodges "the Eddie Van Halen of country-punk." The Vancouver Sun concluded that "there's nothing amusing about taking George Jones' sublime 'Why Baby Why' and subjecting it to sub-metal boogieization."

== Track listing ==
No.	Title	Length
1.	"Cry by Night Operator"
2.	"200 Proof Lovin'"
3.	"Take Me Home, Country Roads"
4.	"Where Bridges Never Burn"
5.	"The Shadow of Night"
6.	"One More Day of Weekend"
7.	"Hell's Gates"
8.	"Why Baby Why"
9.	"Somewhere Within"
10.	"American Legion Party"
