= Fervor =

Fervor may refer to:

- enthusiasm (particularly religious enthusiasm)
- Fervor Records, an independent record label
- Fervor EP, an album by Jason & The Scorchers
