= Smoke (Drivin N Cryin album) =

Studio album by Drivin N Cryin
- Released: February 23, 1993
- Recorded: Triclops, Atlanta, Georgia
- Genre: Southern rock, hard rock
- Length: 52:58
- Label: Island
- Producer: Geoff Workman, DNC

Drivin N Cryin chronology
Fly Me Courageous (1991)	Smoke (1993)	Wrapped in Sky (1995)

Professional ratings
Review scores
Source	Rating
AllMusic	3/5 stars

Smoke is the fifth album from Southern rock group Drivin N Cryin. It was released in February 1993 on Island Records.

== Track listing ==
No.	Title	Length
1.	"Back Against the Wall"	4:11
2.	"She Doesn't Wanna Go"	3:13
3.	"Smoke"	3:20
4.	"When You Come Back"	3:00
5.	"Patron Lady Beautiful"	7:36
6.	"1000 Swings"	3:42
7.	"1988"	3:11
8.	"Whiskey Soul Woman"	4:11
9.	"What's the Difference"	5:29
10.	"Eastern European Carny Man"	3:19
11.	"All Around the World"	3:01
12.	"Turn It Up or Turn It Off"	3:55

Notes

- CD includes "Can’t Fall Off the Mountain," a hidden track which begins after 30 seconds of silence following "Turn It Up or Turn It Off," making track 12's total length 8:09.
