= Homegrown Honey =

Single by Darius Rucker

from the album Southern Style
- Released: August 25, 2014
- Genre: Country
- Length: 3:25
- Label: Capitol Nashville
- Songwriter(s): Darius Rucker; Charles Kelley; Nathan Chapman
- Producer(s): Frank Rogers

Darius Rucker singles chronology
"Miss You" (2014)	"Homegrown Honey" (2014)	"Southern Style" (2015)

"Homegrown Honey" is a song recorded by American country music artist Darius Rucker. It was released in August 2014 as the first single from his fifth studio album. The album, Southern Style, was released on March 31, 2015. Rucker wrote the song with Charles Kelley of Lady Antebellum and Nathan Chapman.

== Critical reception ==
The song received a favorable review from Taste of Country, which called it a "feel-good melody" which "lives up to expectations." It went on to say that the song is "consistent with what Rucker has released since debuting as a full-time country artist in 2008" and "his vocals stand out above all other instruments, stamping an undeniable signature on this country cut." Paul Bowers of Charleston City Paper also gave the song a favorable review. Bowers called it "classic feel-good Rucker," writing that "he's got that country drawl down pat without trying too hard, he's consistently writing catchy summer anthems like this one, and he's just a nice dude by all accounts."

== Commercial performance ==
"Homegrown Honey" debuted at number 55 on the U.S. Billboard Country Airplay chart for the week of August 30, 2014. It also debuted at number 25 on the U.S. Billboard Hot Country Songs chart for the week of September 13, 2014. It also debuted at number 97 on the U.S. Billboard Hot 100 chart for the week of November 22, 2014. As of April 2015, the song has sold 376,000 copies in the US.

The song debuted at number 50 on the Canada Country chart for the week of October 18, 2014. It also debuted at number 76 on the Canadian Hot 100 chart for the week of September 13, 2014.

== Music video ==
A music video was shot in Conway, South Carolina in August 2014, filmed primarily at Coastal Carolina University, with the beginning bar scene shot at Rivertown Bistro in Conway. The video features scenes of a woman in a bar, Rucker in a hallway surrounded by fans, as well as the band playing their concert at the school.

== Charts ==
Chart (2014–2015)	Peak position
Canada (Canadian Hot 100)	76
Canada Country (Billboard)	11
US Billboard Hot 100	53
US Hot Country Songs (Billboard)	6
US Country Airplay (Billboard)	2

=== Year-end charts ===
Chart (2014)	Position
US Hot Country Songs (Billboard)	94
US Country Airplay (Billboard)	86

Chart (2015)	Position
US Hot Country Songs (Billboard)	51
US Country Airplay (Billboard)	15

== Certifications ==
Region	Certification	Certified units/sales
United States (RIAA)	Gold	500,000^{‡}
^{‡} Sales+streaming figures based on certification alone.
