= Buren Fowler =

American rock guitarist

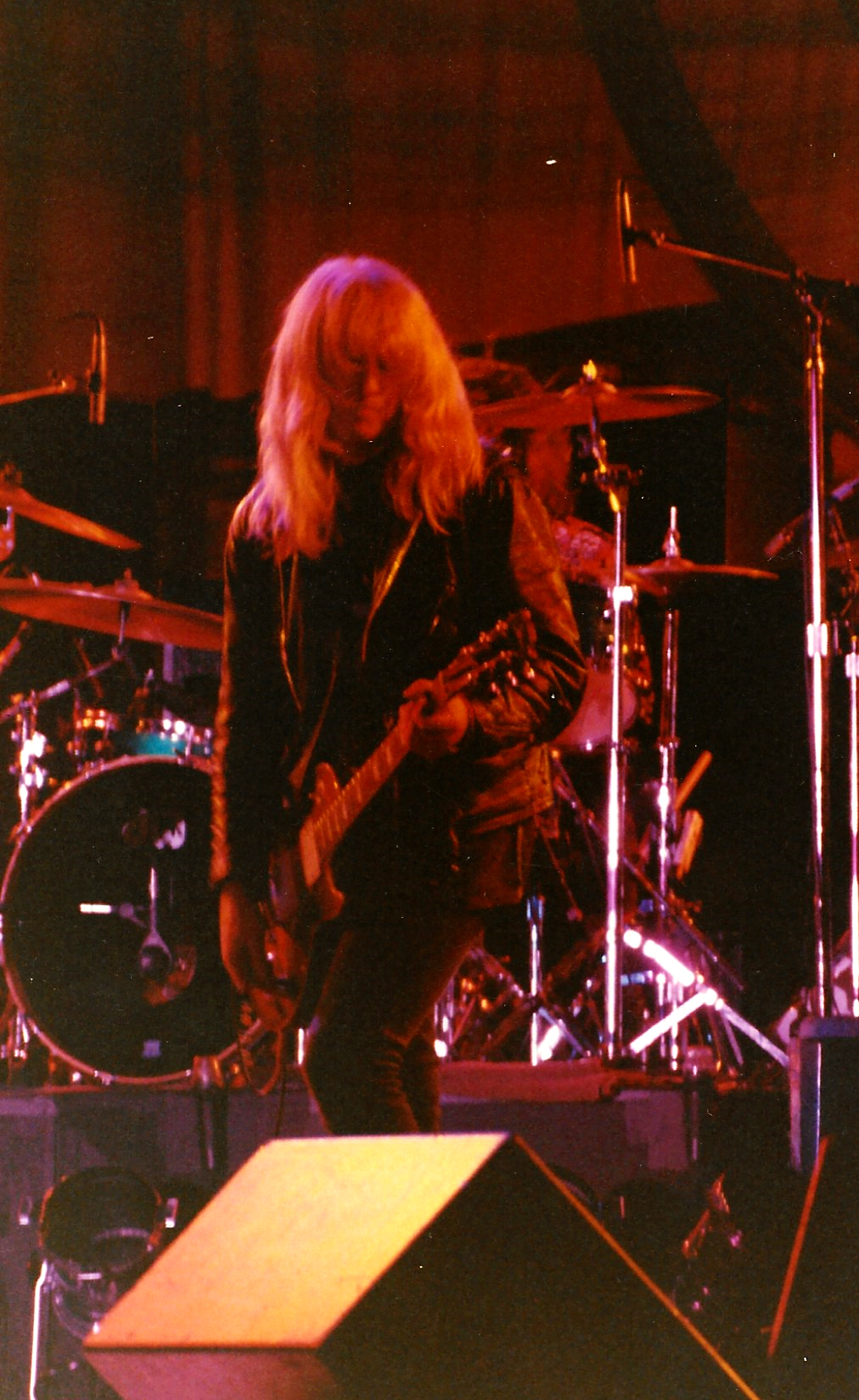
- Fowler with Drivin N Cryin in 1991

Background information
- Born: James Van Buren Fowler; June 29, 1959; Decatur, Georgia, U.S.
- Origin: Decatur, Georgia
- Died: March 8, 2014 (aged 54) Athens, Georgia, U.S.
- Genres: Southern rock
- Occupations: Guitarist, guitar technician
- Instrument: Guitar
- Formerly of: Drivin N Cryin

James van Buren Fowler (June 29, 1959 – March 8, 2014) was an American rock and roll and blues guitar player from Atlanta, Georgia. He was the lead guitarist for Southern rock band Drivin' n' Cryin' from 1988 to 1993, and had previously toured with R.E.M.

== Biography ==
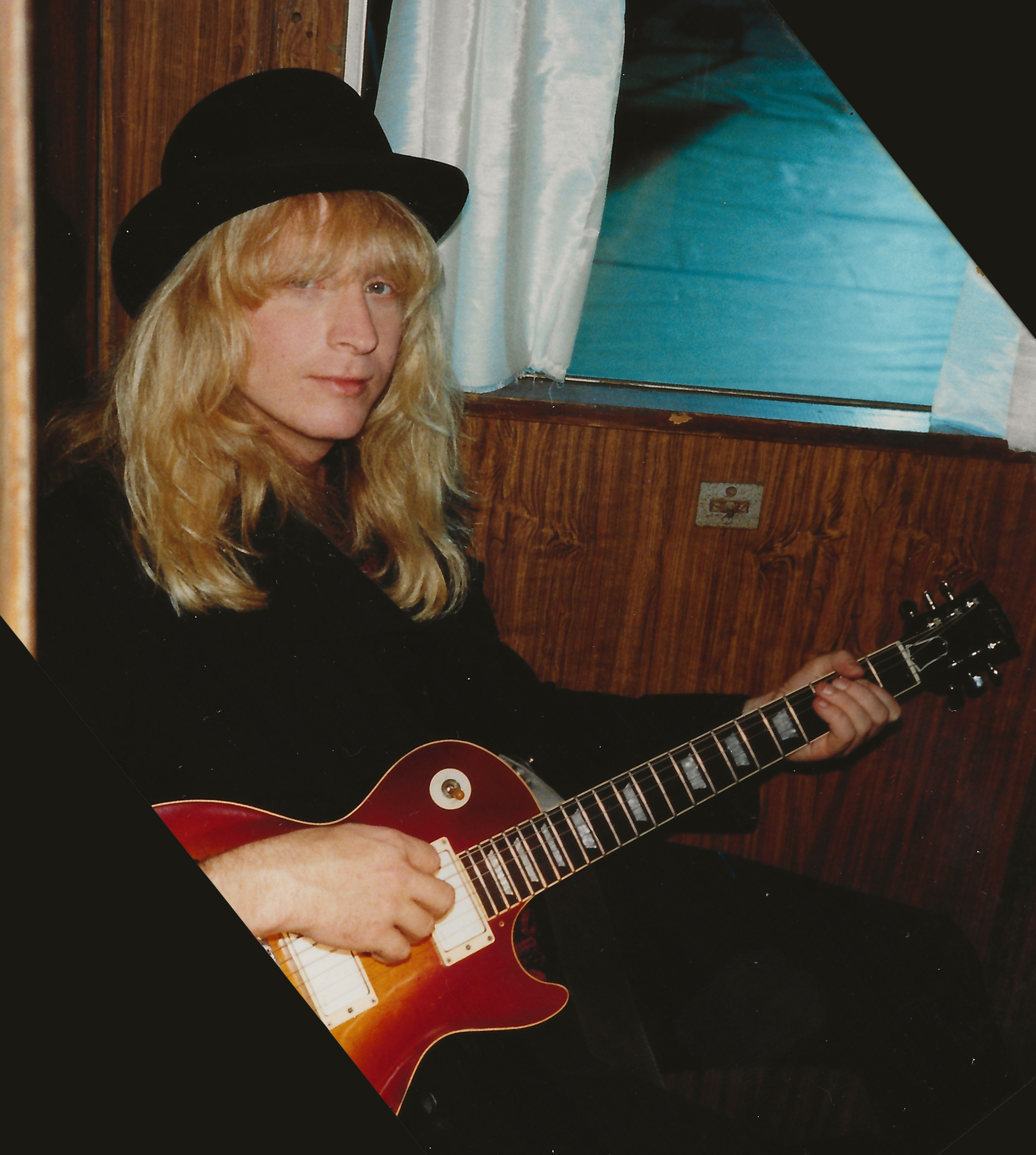
Fowler on the set of the music video for "Fly Me Courageous"

Fowler toured with R.E.M. in the mid-1980s, as a guitar technician for Peter Buck, and later as a featured rhythm guitarist on the band's tours in 1986 and 1987.

Fowler subsequently joined Drivin N Cryin, a band that had frequently opened for and toured with R.E.M. Fowler stayed with Drivin' n' Cryin' until 1994, releasing three records and touring internationally. Fowler departed from the main lineup of Drivin' n' Cryin' when leader Kevn Kinney decided to scale down the group's Southern rock sound.

Fowler, a lifelong, avid baseball fan, relocated to Louisville, Kentucky to work with sports clients, including Louisville Slugger. Repairing, teaching "rock school" at Mom's Music, and building custom guitars, there, he began perfecting his trade craft. After nearly a decade, Fowler returned to Georgia. Back in the peach state he resumed guitar tech work and repair, while playing regionally in his own projects and also with other bands. In addition to teaching guitar. Fowler was succeeded by his children, Ian Fowler and Van Fowler, in 1992 and 1987 respectively.

Fowler briefly reunited with his former bandmates when a 2012 documentary, Scarred but Smarter: Life 'n Times of Driving' n' Cryin', was filmed about the band. Fowler joined them in being honored by the Georgia General Assembly who publicly recognized the band for its contribution to the state's music heritage and community in 2011 with House Resolution 387. He also reunited, most recently, with R.E.M.'s Peter Buck for some live dates when Buck returned to Georgia with his own band, late in 2013.

After experiencing health problems stemming from multiple physical issues in the past two years, Fowler died in his sleep in the early hours of March 8, 2014.

== Discography ==
With Drivin' n' Cryin':

- Whisper Tames the Lion (Jan 1988) U.S. No. 130
- Mystery Road (March 1989)
- Fly Me Courageous (Jan 1991) U.S. No. 90
- Live on Fire (EP) (1991; live tracks from Six Flags Over Georgia March 1991)
- Smoke (Feb 1993) U.S. No. 95
- Wrapped in Sky (Aug 1995)
- Ultimate Collection (Aug 2000)

With Kevn Kinney:

- MacDougal Blues (1990)
