= One Foot in the Honky Tonk =

Studio album by Jason Ringenberg
- Released: 1992
- Genre: Country, country rock
- Label: Liberty
- Producer: Jerry Crutchfield

Jason Ringenberg chronology
One Foot in the Honky Tonk (1992)	A Pocketful of Soul (2000)

One Foot in the Honky Tonk is the debut solo album by the American musician Jason Ringenberg (with both Ringenberg and his band credited as Jason), released in 1992. He supported it with a North American tour. The album was a commercial failure.

== Production ==
Bob Dylan, on Jason & the Scorchers' final tour, had encouraged Jason to return to country music; he decided to heed the advice after a few years of working jobs outside the music industry. One Foot in the Honky Tonk was produced by Jerry Crutchfield, who helped sign Jason and backed him with elite session musicians. Jason and Crutchfield chose the album's ten songs from a pool of around fifty. Jason considered his sound to be "super-charged country rock"; fellow musicians considered it "western beat", a term for outsider country music. Jason cowrote "Hardluck Boy" with Dan Baird. The title track was cowritten with Kevin Welch. "I Washed My Hands in Muddy Water" is a cover of the song made famous by Johnny Rivers. "Try Me" was cowritten by Billy Burnette and Steve Cropper. "Letter of Love" and "Feels So Right" were written by Paul Kennerley.

== Critical reception ==
Professional ratings
Review scores
Source	Rating
All Music Guide to Country	3/5 stars
Chicago Tribune	3/4 stars
The Encyclopedia of Popular Music	3/5 stars
Lincoln Journal Star	A−
MusicHound Rock: The Essential Album Guide	2/5 stars
The Philadelphia Inquirer	3/4 stars
USA Today	3/4 stars

The Gazette said that "Jason finds his true calling in straight, albeit raucous, country music." USA Today noted that "his hybrid Buddy Holly-Jimmie Dale Gilmore vocals ... could gather a whole new audience." The Chicago Tribune stated that Crutchfield "has come up with a clean sound that is noticeably minus the customary clutter of rock while retaining much of that form's instrumental excitement."

The San Antonio Express-News said that the album "straddles the middle range, landing somewhere between the Kentucky Headhunters and 'White Lightnin''-era George Jones." Rolling Stone noted that "the sound, disposition and attitude of his idiosyncratic voice were always as concentrated and sincere as any male honkytonker's... On his solo debut he slows down, settles back a bit and sings with a smooth yet personal Nashville focus." The Lincoln Journal Star praised the "humor and edge" of the music.

== Track listing ==
No.	Title	Length
1.	"The Life of the Party"
2.	"One Foot in the Honky Tonk"
3.	"Try Me"
4.	"Letter of Love"
5.	"Already Burned"
6.	"Hardluck Boy"
7.	"I Washed My Hands in Muddy Water"
8.	"Feels So Right"
9.	"Wild About Me"
10.	"Devil's Daughter"
