= Beers and Sunshine =

2020 single by Darius Rucker

Single by Darius Rucker

from the album Carolyn's Boy
- Released: August 6, 2020
- Genre: Country
- Length: 2:58
- Label: Capitol Nashville
- Songwriter(s): Darius Rucker; Ross Copperman; J.T. Harding; Josh Osborne
- Producer(s): Ross Copperman

Darius Rucker singles chronology
"Straight to Hell" (2018)	"Beers and Sunshine" (2020)	"My Masterpiece" (2021)

"Beers and Sunshine" is a song co-written and recorded by American country music artist Darius Rucker. It was released on August 6, 2020, as the only single from the compilation album #1's - Volume 1. It was later also included on his 2023 album, Carolyn's Boy.

Rucker performed the song live at the 54th Annual Country Music Association Awards, which he co-hosted with Reba McEntire. The music video premiered on November 5, 2020.

== Content ==
Rucker co-wrote the track over video chat with Ross Copperman, J.T. Harding, and Josh Osborne. Copperman also produced the track. The song's title is a play on words for "B.S." which is typically shorthand for bullshit, but Rucker's lyrics suggest "the only B.S. [he] need[s] is beers and sunshine."

== Chart performance ==
The song debuted at No. 24 on the Billboard Country Airplay chart, making it Rucker's highest debut to date, surpassing the No. 26 start for "True Believers" in 2012. It later became Rucker's ninth Country Airplay number one, reaching the top in the issue dated February 27, 2021. It also debuted at No. 25 on the Billboard Hot Country Songs chart.

== Charts ==
=== Weekly charts ===
Chart (2020–2021)	Peak position
Canada (Canadian Hot 100)	46
Canada Country (Billboard)	2
US Billboard Hot 100	42
US Country Airplay (Billboard)	1
US Hot Country Songs (Billboard)	7

=== Year-end charts ===
Chart (2020)	Position
US Hot Country Songs (Billboard)	91

Chart (2021)	Position
US Country Airplay (Billboard)	36
US Hot Country Songs (Billboard)	51

== Certifications ==
Region	Certification	Certified units/sales
Canada (Music Canada)	Platinum	80,000^{‡}
United States (RIAA)	Platinum	1,000,000^{‡}
^{‡} Sales+streaming figures based on certification alone.
