= Warner E. Hodges =

American guitarist (born 1959)

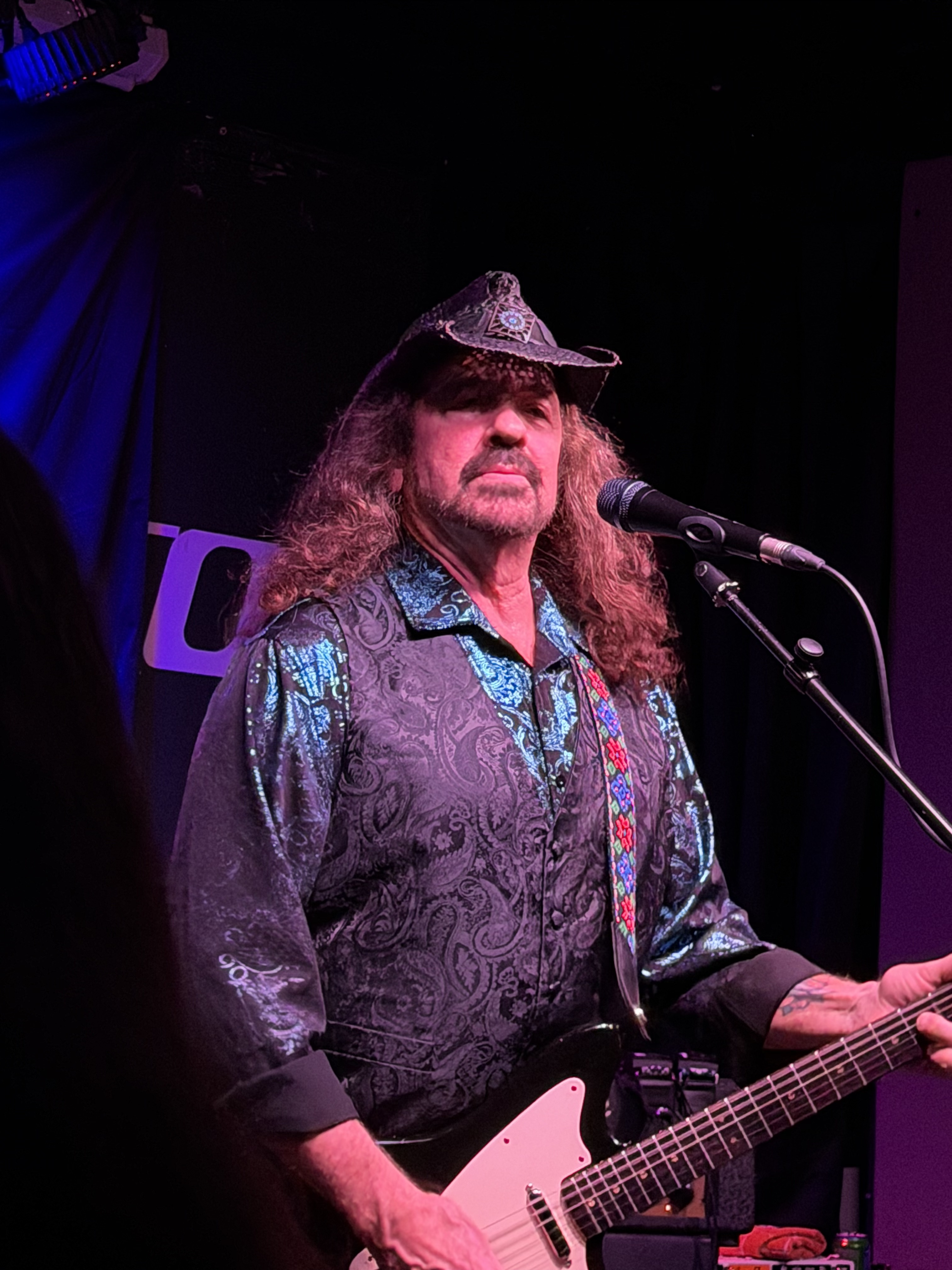
- Hodges performing in 2025

Background information
- Born: June 4, 1959 (age 67); Nashville, Tennessee US
- Genres: Rock; Cowpunk; Country
- Occupations: Musician, songwriter
- Instruments: Guitar, singer, drummer
- Member of: Warner E. Hodges Band, Jason & the Scorchers, Dan Baird & Homemade Sin, The Bluefields, De Piratas
- Formerly of: Drivin N Cryin, Disciples of Loud
- Website: warnerehodges.com

Warner E. Hodges (born June 4, 1959) is an American rock guitarist best known for his service in Jason & the Scorchers. His longtime bandmate, Jason Ringenberg, called Hodges "the only guitarist in the world who can really bridge the gap between James Burton and Angus Young."

Hodges is from Nashville, Tennessee, and even among the many first-rate players from "Guitar Town," he has a longstanding reputation as an ace guitar slinger. His style melds hard rock and heavy metal as well as punk and country.

== Early life ==
Hodges was born in Würzburg, Germany. His father, Edgar W. Hodges, was a U.S. Army officer who served in Korea, Vietnam, the Dominican Republic, and the Panama Canal Zone in addition to Germany.

Edgar and his wife Blanche were professional country musicians who toured with USO shows, entertaining troops at military bases. Their band, Swingin' Strings, opened for well-known performers including Johnny Cash, Lefty Frizzell, and Porter Wagoner.

Blanche Hodges, a singer, had "a soft, pretty Southern voice." She and Ed made a special guest appearance on the 1998 live album by Jason & the Scorchers, Midnight Roads & Stages Seen. Before the performance of "Walking the Dog" by Rufus Thomas, she observed that she used the song as a lullaby for little Warner.

Young Warner's first instrument was drums. He performed in front of a live audience for the first time at age 10 as a drummer when his parents needed a fill-in. However, Warner fell in love with guitar after seeing Angus Young perform at an AC/DC show.

By that time, following his father's retirement from the Army in 1973, the Hodges family had settled in Nashville. Edgar and Blanche were strong supporters of their son's musical endeavors.

== Career ==
=== With Jason & the Scorchers ===
Hodges was in a Nashville band called the Electric Boys along with two other future members of Jason & the Scorchers, Jeff Johnson and Perry Baggs. In 1981 they joined forces with Ringenberg.

Jason & the Nashville Scorchers, as they were originally known, were instrumental in the development of the cowpunk genre. Hodges' deep knowledge of country music, courtesy of his upbringing, helped form the bedrock of the band in tandem with his particular set of influences. In a 2017 interview, he cited Danny Gatton as his all-time favorite guitar player, along with a long list of rock and country artists, famous stars as well as less-recognized names.

His playing, which combined power and subtlety, was an integral part of the band's sound.

The guitarist contributed greatly to the visual aspect of the band's performances as well. Though Ringenberg was a highly energetic frontman, Hodges was also visually prominent and full of showmanship.

- He typically wore "boots with dangerous-looking spurs."
- He played solos with a cigarette in his nose and a longneck beer bottle in his mouth.
- He spun himself in circles on stage.
- He threw his guitar on its strap over his shoulder 360 degrees and continued to play without missing.

Both the spinning and over-the-shoulder moves may be seen in the appearance on Late Night with Conan O'Brien on April 29, 1998: (Video on YouTube).

An apt description of Hodges as a guitar hero came in 1989. Stereo Review noted that he "shows more imagination per cut than most axemen demonstrate in a lifetime. On top of pouring out riffs like a rumbling volcano spits out lava, Hodges will interpolate delicate little rhythmic accents...He often manages to be brutal and graceful at the same time."

A 1995 account noted that Hodges' "vast warehouse of guitar tricks" included "Chuck Berry riffs, crunching heavy metal sputter, barbed-wire arpeggios, [and] Eddie Van Halen squalls."

The Scorchers disbanded in 1990 but reformed in 1993. They were active throughout the rest of the 1990s and have reconvened sporadically since then with various lineups; Ringenberg and Hodges are the constants.

Their last album to date is Halcyon Times (2010).

=== With Dan Baird & Homemade Sin ===
Former Georgia Satellites frontman Dan Baird introduced this band in 2005, with Hodges joining him on lead guitar. A 2008 article in the Irish Times noted the presence of the "celebrated guitarist" on the group's debut album. Hodges played with Homemade Sin on various records and tours in addition to fronting his own band. A 2018 show review noted that Baird and Hodges gave "the undeniable sense you were in the room with a power source."

=== With the Disciples of Loud ===
This band self-released an album called Let the Beatings Begin in 2003. Nashville Scene described the "guitar-slinger extraordinaire" and lead vocalist vividly that December.

Preachin' the Gospel (under the billing "Warner E. Hodges and the Disciples of Loud") came out on Hodges' own imprint, Nash Vegas Flash, in 2013.

Nash Vegas Flash is also the name that Hodges uses for his song publishing.

=== With the Warner E. Hodges Band ===
Hodges has released four albums under this band's name:

- Centerline (2008)
- Gunslinger (2014)
- Right Back Where I Started (2017)
- Just Feels Right (2020)
- Soul Shaker (2023)

In addition to playing lead guitar, he is the lead vocalist and is "more than capable" in the latter capacity.

His other Band Members are: Ben Marsden, Jason Knight and Shane Dixon.

A compilation, Boots Up: The Best of the Warner E. Hodges Band So Far, was released in the U.K. and Europe in 2021 and in the U.S. in 2022.

The Warner E. Hodges Band are lined up to take part in the Outlaw Country Cruise in February 2024, as they did from 2019 through 2023

=== With the Bluefields ===
This Nashville band features Hodges' friend Joe Blanton, another member of that city's rock scene. Blanton had previously been singer and guitarist in The Royal Court of China, a 1980s band.

As Hodges explained in 2022, he is part of a songwriting team with Blanton and Dan Baird. The songs wind up in either a Bluefields pile, a Homemade Sin pile, or a "Warner" pile.

The Bluefields have released four albums between 2012 and 2020.

=== With Drivin N Cryin ===
Hodges toured with Drivin N Cryin in 2015 and 2016. That band's leader, Kevn Kinney, remarked, "With Warner Hodges, it's a special show." Kinney later described Hodges as "a legend...a take-no-prisoners guitar-shredder."

=== With De Piratas ===
In August 2021, Hodges and old comrade Jeff Johnson (whom he hadn't seen in more than a decade) were guests on a podcast about Nashville's rock history. They invited one of the hosts, Jonathan Bright, to join them in a new musical venture.

The result was an album called F.U., self-released in April 2022. Also playing on the album was bassist Tom Petersson of Cheap Trick.

== Personal life ==
Hodges developed a problem with alcohol in the 1980s. He has been sober since 1992. His hard-earned achievement has led many others to seek his advice. He has been married twice. He met his second wife at an A.A. meeting. He is stepfather to his wife Deborah's three children: Brock, Chauncey, and Emelia.
