= Carolyn's Boy =

Studio album by Darius Rucker
- Released: October 6, 2023
- Genre: Country
- Length: 46:04
- Label: Capitol Nashville
- Producers: Ross Copperman; Dann Huff; Frank Rogers

Darius Rucker chronology
When Was the Last Time (2017)	Carolyn's Boy (2023)

Singles from Carolyn's Boy
- 1. "Beers and Sunshine" Released: August 6, 2020; 2. "Fires Don't Start Themselves" Released: April 3, 2023

"It was during the pandemic and we were writing the record, and I was having a bad day/ I just said to myself, 'At the end of the day, I'm just my mama's boy,' so I decided I was going to name it Carolyn's Boy after that. She was such a big influence on me and she was so important in my life. It was time for me to do something special like that."

— Rucker, on writing and recording Carolyn's Boy

Carolyn's Boy is the eighth studio album and sixth in the country genre by American singer Darius Rucker. It was released on October 6, 2023, through Capitol Nashville. The album is dedicated to Rucker's mother Carolyn, who raised him and his siblings as a single mother and died before her son experienced success in the music industry. The album was preceded by the singles "Beers and Sunshine" and "Fires Don't Start Themselves".

== Background ==
Rucker set out to record new music and encountered an emotionally difficult day writing and he realized that he was a "mama's boy" and began to focus on writing in memory of his dead mother, Carolyn. He enlisted several co-writers to help him explore his personal life and experience, including British pop musician Ed Sheeran, who helped him co-write a song about a childhood girlfriend. It also includes a collaboration with Chapel Hart on "Ol' Church Hymn" and a cover of Rihanna's "Lift Me Up".

"Beers and Sunshine" was released on August 6, 2020, as the lead single from Rucker's compilation album, #1's - Volume 1. It became Rucker's ninth number one hit on the Billboard Country Airplay chart in the week dated February 27, 2021, and was later included on Carolyn's Boy. "Fires Don't Start Themselves" was released on April 3, 2023, and reached a peak of number 25 on the Billboard Country Airplay chart.

"Never Been Over", which was originally included on the album as a solo cut, was later re-recorded as a duet with Jennifer Nettles and released as a single to country radio on May 20, 2024. Rucker began writing the song early into the COVID-19 pandemic with Lee Thomas Miller and Josh Osborne. While his collaborators viewed it as a love song, Rucker viewed it as more of a breakup song, and he recorded it in the wake of his divorce from Beth Leonard. Kacey Musgraves was originally considered as a featured vocalist for the song ahead of the solo version that ended up on the album, before Nettles was ultimately added for the single release.

== Reception ==
Editors at AllMusic rated this album 3 out of 5 stars, with critic Stephen Thomas Erlewine writing that the songs have a "funny, cheerful, and just clever enough not to be dull" quality.

Brennen Kelly of Country Chord gave the album a 6 out of 10, writing that the album is "not breaking any ground lyrically or sonically, but it's not an unpleasant listen by any stretch of the imagination."

== Track listing ==
Carolyn's Boy track listing
No.	Title	Writer(s)	Length
1.	"Beers and Sunshine"	Darius Rucker; Ross Copperman; JT Harding; Josh Osborne	2:58
2.	"In This Together"	Rucker; Derek George; Bobby Hamrick; Joy Williams	3:01
3.	"Never Been Over"	Rucker; Lee Thomas Miller; Osborne	3:25
4.	"Fires Don't Start Themselves"	Ben Hayslip; Dan Isbell; Jacob Rice	3:46
5.	"Ol' Church Hymn" (featuring Chapel Hart)	Rucker; Hayslip; Greylan James; Josh Miller	3:30
6.	"7 Days"	Rucker; Copperman; Ashley Gorley; Charles Kelley	3:20
7.	"Same Beer Different Problem"	Rucker; Topher Brown; Sarah Buxton; Brad Tursi	3:01
8.	"Sara"	Rucker; Joel Crouse; Kyle Rife; Ed Sheeran	3:39
9.	"Have a Good Time"	Rucker; Monty Criswell; George; Hamrick	3:31
10.	"Sure Would Have Loved Her"	Rucker; Wyatt Durrette; Levi Lowrey	3:08
11.	"Southern Comfort"	Chris LaCorte; Osborne; Matt Rogers	3:10
12.	"3am in Carolina"	Rucker; Copperman; Michael Hardy	3:19
13.	"Lift Me Up"	Ryan Coogler; Robyn Fenty; Ludwig Goransson; Temilade Openiyi	3:11
14.	"Stargazing"	Rucker; Brinley Addington; Jess Cayne; Matt Morrisey	2:58
Total length:			46:04

== Personnel ==
Musicians

- Darius Rucker – lead vocals
- Ilya Toshinskiy – acoustic guitar (tracks 1, 3, 8, 10, 12), banjo (1, 3), electric guitar (1, 8, 12); Dobro, ukulele (1); baritone guitar (10), mandolin (10)
- Ross Copperman – programming (1, 5–7, 12); background vocals, keyboards (1, 6, 7, 12); acoustic guitar (1, 6, 10, 12), electric guitar (12)
- Tony Lucido – bass guitar (1, 3, 5–8, 10, 12, 14)
- Aaron Sterling – drums (1, 4, 11, 13), percussion (4, 11)
- Charles Kelley – background vocals (1)
- Hillary Scott – background vocals (1)
- Dave Haywood – background vocals (1)
- Lee Turner – keyboards (1)
- Mark Hill – bass guitar (2, 4, 9, 11, 13)
- Charlie Worsham – acoustic guitar (2, 9, 14)
- Jerry Roe – drums (2, 9, 14), percussion (2, 9)
- Derek Wells – electric guitar (2, 9, 14)
- Gordon Mote – Hammond B3 (2, 9), piano (9, 14), keyboards (14)
- Wes Hightower – background vocals (2, 9)
- Aubrey Haynie – mandolin (2, 3), fiddle (9, 10, 12, 14)
- Frank Rogers –percussion, programming (2, 9)
- Mike Johnson – Dobro (2)
- Dan Dugmore – pedal steel (3, 5–8, 10, 12)
- Dave Cohen – keyboards (3, 8, 10, 12); Hammond B3, piano (6)
- John Osborne – acoustic guitar (3)
- Danny Radar – acoustic guitar (4, 6, 11, 13), electric guitar (6), banjo (11)
- Kris Donegan – electric guitar (4, 5, 11), acoustic guitar (7)
- Josh Reedy – background vocals (4, 11, 13)
- Rob McNelley – electric guitar (4, 11)
- Stuart Duncan – fiddle (4, 11)
- David Dorn – Hammond B3, piano (4); keyboards (11, 13)
- Chapel Hart – vocals, background vocals (5)
- Carolyn Dawn Johnson – background vocals (5)
- Nir Z – drums (5, 7)
- Kenny Greenberg – electric guitar (5, 7)
- Jeff Roach – keyboards (5, 7)
- Fred Eltringham – drums (6, 8, 10, 12), percussion (12)
- Tofer Brown – background vocals (7)
- Micah Wilshire – background vocals (8)
- Bobby Hamrick – background vocals (9)
- Derek George – background vocals (9)
- Monty Criswell – background vocals (9)
- Dann Huff – electric guitar (11), programming (13)
- David Huff – fiddle (11), programming (13)
- Paul Franklin – steel guitar (11, 13)
- Everett Drake – choir (13)
- Kyla Harris – choir (13)
- Michael Mishaw – choir (13)
- Robert Bailey – choir (13)
- Vicki Hampton – choir (13)
- Wendy Moten – choir (13)
- Charlie Judge – strings (13)
- Jess Cayne – background vocals (14)
- Matt Morrisey – background vocals (14)

Technical

- Ross Copperman – production, engineering (1, 3, 5–8, 10, 12)
- Frank Rogers – production, engineering (2, 9, 14)
- Dann Huff – production (4, 11, 13)
- Pete Lyman – mastering
- F. Reid Shippen – mixing, engineering (1, 3, 5–8, 10, 12)
- Justin Niebank – mixing (2, 4, 9, 11, 14), engineering (2, 4, 9, 11, 13, 14)
- Sean Moffitt – mixing (13)
- Lee Turner – engineering (1, 3, 5–8, 10, 12), editing (1)
- Aaron Sterling – engineering (1)
- Ilya Toshinskiy – engineering (1)
- Julian King – engineering (2, 9, 14)
- Josh Reedy – engineering (4, 11)
- Brian David Willis – editing (3, 5–8, 10, 12)
- David Huff – editing (4, 13)
- Drew Bollman – additional mixing (4), additional engineering (2, 9, 14)
- Michael Mechling – engineering assistance (1, 3, 5–8, 10, 12)
- Jordan Reed – engineering assistance (2, 9, 14)
- Kam Luchterhand – engineering assistance (2, 9, 14)
- Joel McKenney – engineering assistance (4, 11, 13)
- Sean Badum – engineering assistance (13)

== Sales and chart performance ==
The album debuted at No. 27 on the Top Country Albums and on the Billboard 200 at No. 153, with 9,000 first week equivalent units.

Chart performance for Carolyn's Boy
Chart (2023)	Peak position
US Billboard 200	153
US Top Country Albums (Billboard)	27
Scottish Albums (Official Charts)	58
UK Country Albums (Official Charts)	3

== See also ==
- 2023 in American music
- 2023 in country music
- List of 2023 albums
