= If I Told You (song) =

Single by Darius Rucker

from the album When Was the Last Time
- Released: July 5, 2016
- Genre: Country
- Length: 3:34
- Label: Capitol Nashville
- Songwriters: Ross Copperman; Shane McAnally; Jon Nite
- Producer: Ross Copperman

Darius Rucker singles chronology
"Southern Style" (2015)	"If I Told You" (2016)	"For the First Time" (2017)

"If I Told You" is a song written by Ross Copperman along with Shane McAnally and Jon Nite, and recorded by American country music artist Darius Rucker. It was released on July 5, 2016 as the lead single from his fifth country studio album, When Was the Last Time, which was released on October 20, 2017.

== Commercial performance ==
The song debuted at No. 46 on the Hot Country Songs chart on the chart dated July 16, 2016. It also debuted at No. 43 on the Country Airplay chart. The song reached No. 1 on the Country Airplay chart for the week of June 24, 2017, making it Rucker's first since "Wagon Wheel" in 2013. It sold 31,000 copies in its first full week on sale. The song has sold 359,000 copies in the United States as of July 2017.

=== Charts ===
Chart (2016–2017)	Peak position
US Billboard Hot 100	53
US Hot Country Songs (Billboard)	4
US Country Airplay (Billboard)	1

=== Year-end charts ===
Chart (2017)	Position
US Billboard Country Airplay	29
US Billboard Hot Country Songs	32

== Certifications ==
Certifications for If I Told You
Region	Certification	Certified units/sales
United States (RIAA)	2× Platinum	2,000,000^{‡}
^{‡} Sales+streaming figures based on certification alone.
