= Thunder and Fire =

Studio album by Jason & the Scorchers
- Released: 1989
- Genre: Rock and roll, roots rock, country rock
- Label: A&M
- Producer: Barry Beckett

Jason & the Scorchers chronology
Still Standing (1986)	Thunder and Fire (1989)	Essential Jason and the Scorchers, Volume One: Are You Ready for the Country (1992)

Thunder and Fire is an album by the American band Jason & the Scorchers, released in 1989. The band promoted the album by playing shows with Webb Wilder and Bob Dylan, among others. "When the Angels Cry" and "Find You" were released as singles.

The album was a commercial disappointment, failing to chart. The band broke up after the album's release, but reformed in the mid-1990s.

== Production ==
The album was produced by Barry Beckett. The band placed stage lights in the studio, to reproduce the atmosphere of a live show. The Scorchers spent two years making the album, recording it with new members Andy York and Ken Fox; the band had around 45 songs from which to choose. "My Kingdom for a Car" is a cover of the Phil Ochs song. "Bible and a Gun" was cowritten by Steve Earle. Don Schlitz cowrote "When the Angels Cry".

== Critical reception ==
Professional ratings
Review scores
Source	Rating
AllMusic	3/5 stars
Chicago Sun-Times	3/4 stars
Chicago Tribune	3.5/4 stars
The Encyclopedia of Popular Music	3/5 stars
Houston Chronicle	4.5/5 stars
MusicHound Rock: The Essential Album Guide	2/5 stars
Ottawa Citizen	3/5 stars
The Rolling Stone Album Guide	3/5 stars

Trouser Press wrote that, "rather than successfully integrating the group's stylistic impulses, Thunder and Fire divides them into reheated rockers that short the Scorchers' personality and semi-acoustic country numbers that seem out of place." The Washington Post concluded that it "comes closer to the band's high-voltage live show than any of its first three albums." The Richmond Times-Dispatch labeled that band "honest, unfussy and committed to delivering red hot rock 'n' roll." The Houston Chronicle considered it "a graceful attempt at gaining a wider audience without sacrificing the band's soul."

The Chicago Tribune determined that "Jason is no snarler—his voice is plaintive—and his melodies keep ringing long after the volume subsides." The New York Times concluded that "few bands can deliver clanging, stomping, crunching flat-out rock-and-roll like Jason and the Scorchers." The Chicago Sun-Times opined that Thunder and Fire "lacks the songwriting richness of previous efforts, but it comes close to capturing the concert sizzle of America's most incendiary roots-rock band." The Providence Journal listed the album as one of the ten best of 1989.

AllMusic wrote that "Bible and a Gun" "recalls the best things about the roots-rock movement of the late '80s." The Austin American-Statesman deemed "When the Angels Cry" "the most powerful music of the band's recorded history." The Rolling Stone Album Guide noted that the songs were still about "girls and driving."

== Track listing ==
No.	Title	Length
1.	"When the Angels Cry"
2.	"Now That You're Mine"
3.	"You Gotta Way with Me"
4.	"My Kingdom for a Car"
5.	"Close Up the Road"
6.	"Lights Out"
7.	"Find You"
8.	"Bible and a Gun"
9.	"Six Feet Underground"
10.	"No Turning Back"
11.	"Away from You"

== Personnel ==
Musicians

- Jason Ringenberg – vocals, harmonica
- Warner Hodges – electric and acoustic guitars, Nashville high string guitar, mandolin, harmony vocals
- Andy York – electric and acoustic guitars, dobro
- Ken Fox – bass guitar
- Perry Baggs – drums, percussion, harmony vocals

Production and technical

- Barry Beckett – producer
- Steve Ralbovsky – executive producer, A&R coordinator
- Justin Niebank – mixing, recording
- Bob Ludwig – mastering
- David Radin – 2nd engineer
- Kevin Twit – assistant engineer
- Jon Suskin – road manager, road engineer, studio assistant engineer
- Jeff Gold, Richard Frankel – art direction
- Steve Gerdes – design
- Harris Savides – photography
