= Southern Style =

Studio album by Darius Rucker
- Released: March 31, 2015
- Recorded: 2014
- Genre: Country
- Label: Capitol Nashville
- Producer: Frank Rogers, Keith Stegall (tracks 3, 5, 8, 11, 13)

Darius Rucker chronology
Home for the Holidays (2014)	Southern Style (2015)	When Was the Last Time (2017)

Singles from Southern Style
- 1. "Homegrown Honey" Released: August 25, 2014; 2. "Southern Style" Released: May 4, 2015

Southern Style is the sixth studio album and fourth in the country genre by American singer Darius Rucker. It was released on March 31, 2015, by Capitol Records Nashville. The album's lead single, "Homegrown Honey", was released to country radio on August 25, 2014. The album's second single, the title track was released to country radio on May 4, 2015. The album won International Album of the Year at the British Country Music Association Awards.

== Background ==
News about Rucker's working on his fourth country release was first announced in August 2014. Sixty songs were written for the album then with twelve to fifteen of them being cut for the record. Once again Rucker worked with record producer, Frank Rogers on the album. On working with Rogers, Rucker says, "I can't go in to record with the attitude that I want to sound different. It's all about the songs for me. I want great songs. And if we have great songs, then Frank is the genius and does what he does." When Rucker was visiting The Tonight Show Starring Jimmy Fallon on January 12, 2015, he announced that his new album would be called Southern Style, as well as the release date, and tour to support the album.

== Commercial performance ==
The album debuted at No. 1 on the Top Country Albums, his fourth No. 1 on the chart. It also debuted on Billboard 200 at No. 7, with 52,000 copies sold in the US for the week. As of September 2016, the album has sold 199,000 copies in the United States.

== Track listing ==
All tracks are written by Darius Rucker, with additional co-writers as noted.

Standard edition
No.	Title	Writer(s)	Length
1.	"Homegrown Honey"	Charles Kelley; Nathan Chapman	3:24
2.	"Good for a Good Time"	Kendell Marvel; Jeremy Spillman	3:40
3.	"Baby I'm Right" (featuring Mallary Hope)	Mark Nesler; Brian Phillip White	3:14
4.	"Southern Style"	Tim James; Rivers Rutherford	3:58
5.	"High on Life"	Jessi Alexander; Josh Thompson	3:34
6.	"Perfect"	Ashley Gorley; Rhett Akins	3:21
7.	"You, Me & My Guitar"	Gorley; Akins	3:17
8.	"Low Country"	Troy Verges; Blair Daly; Hillary Lindsey	4:12
9.	"Need You More"	Deric Ruttan; Jonathan Singleton	3:31
10.	"Half Full Dixie Cup"	Monty Criswell; Frank Rogers	3:34
11.	"Lighter Up"	Blake Bollinger; Drew Davis	3:16
12.	"You Can Have Charleston"	Rogers	4:29
13.	"So I Sang"	James; Rutherford	3:27
14.	"Down Here" (Bonus track)		3:36
15.	"It's All Over" (Bonus track)		3:12
Total length:			46:57

== Personnel ==
Musicians

- David Angell – violin (9)
- Eddie Bayers – drums (3, 8)
- Blake Bollinger – background vocals (11)
- Pat Buchanan – slide guitar (4)
- J.T. Corenflos – electric guitar (1–13)
- Eric Darken – percussion (1, 2, 4, 7, 9, 10, 12)
- David Davidson – violin (9)
- Drew Davis – background vocals (11)
- Shannon Forrest – drums (1, 6, 7, 9, 10)
- Aubrey Haynie – fiddle (1, 2, 7, 10), mandolin (9, 12)
- Wes Hightower – background vocals (1, 2, 4, 6, 7, 9, 10, 12)
- Mallary Hope – vocals (3)
- Mike Johnson – pedal steel guitar (6, 9, 12), dobro (10)
- Anthony LaMarchina – cello (9)
- Stephen Lamb – copyist (9)
- Andy Leftwich – mandolin (3, 5, 8, 11), fiddle (13)
- Brent Mason – acoustic guitar (3, 13), electric guitar (5, 11), slide guitar (8)
- Greg Morrow – drums (2, 4, 5, 11–13)
- Gordon Mote – piano (2, 4, 5, 9, 10, 12), Hammond B-3 organ (2–5, 7, 8, 11, 12), keyboards (13), Wurlitzer (2)
- Danny Rader – acoustic guitar (1, 2, 4, 6, 7, 9, 10, 12), electric guitar (2, 4, 6, 7, 9, 10, 12), banjo (1)
- Michael Rhodes – bass guitar (1, 2, 4, 6, 7, 9, 10, 12)
- Rich Robinson – slide guitar (4)
- Frank Rogers – electric guitar (6), piano (1)
- Darius Rucker – lead vocals
- Bryan Sutton – acoustic guitar (2, 4, 6, 7, 9, 10, 12), banjo (7)
- Russell Terrell – background vocals (1–13)
- Bobby Terry – acoustic guitar (3, 5, 8, 13), banjo guitar (11)
- Derek Wells – electric guitar (1, 2, 4, 6, 7, 9, 10, 12)
- Kristin Wilkinson – string arrangements and viola (9)
- Glenn Worf – bass guitar (3, 5, 8, 11, 13)

Technical personnel

- Scotty Alexander – digital editing assistant (1, 2, 4, 6, 7, 9, 10, 12)
- Brady Barnett – digital editing assistant (1, 2, 4, 6, 7, 9, 10, 12)
- Richard Barrow – engineer and additional engineering (1, 2, 4, 6, 7, 9, 10, 12)
- Drew Bollman – additional engineering and assistant mix engineer (1, 2, 4, 6, 7, 9, 10, 12)
- Jason Campbell – production coordinator (3, 5, 8, 11, 13)
- Neal Cappellino – additional engineering (1, 2, 4, 6, 7, 9, 10, 12)
- Tom Freitag – assistant engineer (3, 5, 8, 11, 13)
- Jeff Hodges – additional assistant engineering (3, 5, 8, 11, 13)
- Travis Humbert – assistant engineer and additional engineering (3, 5, 8, 11, 13)
- Scott Johnston – production assistance (1, 2, 4, 6, 7, 9, 10, 12)
- John Kelton – engineer and mixing (3, 5, 8, 11, 13)
- Trevor Marron – additional assistant engineering
- Beau Maxwell – assistant engineer (1, 2, 4, 6, 7, 9, 10, 12)
- Justin Niebank – mixing (1, 2, 4, 6, 7, 9, 10, 12)
- Frank Rogers – producer (1, 2, 4, 6, 7, 9, 10, 12)
- Keith Stegall – producer (3, 5, 8, 11, 13)
- Hank Williams – mastering
- Brian David Willis – digital editing and additional engineering (1, 2, 4, 6, 7, 9, 10, 12)

== Chart performance ==
=== Weekly charts ===
Chart (2015)	Peak position
US Billboard 200	7
US Top Country Albums (Billboard)	1

=== Year-end charts ===
Chart (2015)	Position
US Billboard 200	189
US Top Country Albums (Billboard)	22

=== Singles ===
Year	Single	Peak chart positions				
Year	Single	US Country	US Country Airplay	US	CAN Country	CAN
2014	"Homegrown Honey"	6	2	53	11	76
2015	"Southern Style"	38	33	—	—	—

== Release history ==
List of release dates, showing region, label, format and edition(s)
Region	Date	Format(s)	Label	Edition(s)
United States	March 31, 2015	CD, digital download	Capitol Nashville	Standard
