= Fly Me Courageous =

Studio album by Drivin' N' Cryin'
- Released: January 8, 1991
- Recorded: 1990
- Studios: Kiva, Memphis, Tennessee
- Genres: Southern rock, hard rock
- Length: 39:23
- Label: Island
- Producer: Geoff Workman

Drivin' N' Cryin' chronology
| Mystery Road (1989) | Fly Me Courageous (1991) | Smoke (1993) |

Singles from Fly Me Courageous
- 1. "Fly Me Courageous" Released: 1990; 2. "Build a Fire" Released: 1991; 3. "The Innocent" Released: 1991; 4. "Around the Block Again" Released: 1992

Fly Me Courageous is the fourth studio album by Southern rock band Drivin' N' Cryin', released on January 8, 1991, by Island Records. The album is the band's most commercially successful release, in part due to the title track striking a patriotic chord in the United States during the start of the Persian Gulf War. In 1995, Fly Me Courageous was certified gold.

== Overview ==
Originally, Andy Johns was slotted to produce the album, as the band was impressed by his work with Rod Stewart and Cinderella. However, Johns fell ill, so they chose Geoff Workman to produce instead.

Fly Me Courageous was released during the outbreak of the Persian Gulf War. In turn, the album's title track was interpreted as a pro-war song. "Fly Me Courageous" reached No. 15 on the Modern Rock Tracks chart. Drivin' N Cryin's guitarist Kevn Kinney said of the song's success:

We were getting invitations to play Naval and Air Force bases and getting tours of airplanes and pilots telling us they were listening to it before takeoff.

"Build a Fire" enjoyed some commercial success, reaching No. 15 on the Mainstream Rock Tracks chart and receiving regular rotation on MTV.

== Reception ==
Professional ratings
Review scores
| Source | Rating |
|---|---|
| AllMusic | 4.5/5 stars |
| Entertainment Weekly | B− |
| Kerrang! | 1/5 stars |
| Raw | 2/5 stars |

Tom Demalon of AllMusic called Fly Me Courageous Drivin' N Cryin's "finest moment, both commercially and artistically." Entertainment Weekly's Bob Mack wrote of the album: "Stabs at pop ('Together') and last-ditch efforts to dazzle ('Rush Hour') are too little, too late, but even so, their impulse to integrate influences rather than pick a niche is refreshing". Both reviewers also noted the influence of R.E.M. on the album's sound (Drivin' N Cryin' had toured with R.E.M. during R.E.M.'s Green tour).

== Track listing ==
All tracks are written by Drivin' N' Cryin'.

| No. | Title | Length |
|---|---|---|
| 1. | "Around the Block Again" | 3:31 |
| 2. | "Chain Reaction" | 3:47 |
| 3. | "Fly Me Courageous" | 3:23 |
| 4. | "Look What You've Done to Your Brother" | 2:58 |
| 5. | "For You" | 4:35 |
| 6. | "Let's Go Dancing" | 3:18 |
| 7. | "The Innocent" | 4:16 |
| 8. | "Together" | 3:51 |
| 9. | "Lost in the Shuffle" | 3:04 |
| 10. | "Build a Fire" | 3:15 |
| 11. | "Rush Hour" | 3:25 |

== Personnel ==
The following people contributed to Fly Me Courageous:

Drivin' N Cryin'

- Kevin Kinney – guitar, lead vocals
- Buren Fowler – guitar
- Tim Nielsen – bass, mandolin, backing vocals
- Jeff Sullivan – drums, percussion

Additional personnel

- George Marino – mastering
- Tim "Super Glue" Ray – assistant engineering
- Geoff Workman – engineering, production

== Charts ==
=== Album ===
| Chart (1991) | Peak position |
|---|---|
| US Billboard 200 | 90 |

=== Singles ===
| Year | Song | Chart positions | |
| Year | Song | US Modern Rock | US Mainstream Rock |
|---|---|---|---|
| 1991 | "Fly Me Courageous" | 15 | 19 |
| 1991 | "Build a Fire" | – | 15 |
| 1991 | "The Innocent" | – | 31 |
"—" denotes releases that did not chart.

== See also ==
- MacDougal Blues, a 1990 Kevn Kinney solo album that features members of Drivin' 'n Cryin'
