= Still Standing (Jason & the Scorchers album) =

Studio album by Jason & the Scorchers
- Released: 1986
- Studios: Cherokee (Hollywood, California); Scruggs Sound (Berry Hill, Tennessee)
- Genre: Country rock
- Label: EMI America
- Producer: Tom Werman

Jason & the Scorchers chronology
Lost & Found (1984)	Still Standing (1986)	Thunder and Fire (1989)

Still Standing is a 1986 album from Jason & the Scorchers. It peaked at No. 91 on the Billboard 200 in March 1987.

Produced by Tom Werman, the album includes the band's cover version of the Rolling Stones' "19th Nervous Breakdown", which was the first single to be taken from the album.

== Reception ==
AllMusic gave the album three stars, with reviewer Mark Deming viewing it as "an attempt to give Jason & the Scorchers a bit of polish in hopes of attracting a wider audience", while Musician magazine saw it as the band "sharpening their attack". Audio magazine, gave the album a B rating for sound, and B+ for performance. No Depression, reviewing the CD reissue, saw it as "a move toward the mainstream", and wrote that it "paled in comparison to the band's live persona". Walter Tunis, writing for PopMatters, saw it as "a slicker record, perhaps, but one that raised the caliber of the band’s songwriting".

== Track listing ==
Side one

1. "Golden Ball and Chain" (Ringenberg)
2. "Crashin' Down" (Ringenberg)
3. "Shotgun Blues" (Ringenberg)
4. "Good Things Come to Those Who Wait" (Ringenberg, Hodges, Johnson, Emerson)
5. "My Heart Still Stands with You" (Ringenberg)

Side two

1. "19th Nervous Breakdown" (Jagger, Richards)
2. "Ocean of Doubt" (Ringenberg)
3. "Ghost Town" (Malloy, Brannan, Ringenberg)
4. "Take Me to Your Promised Land" (Ringenberg)

The album was issued on CD in 2002 with three bonus tracks: "Greetings from Nashville", "Route 66", and "The Last Ride".

== Charts ==
Chart (1985)	Peak position
US Billboard 200	91

== Personnel ==
- Jason Ringenberg - vocals, harmonica
- Warner Hodges - electric and acoustic guitars, vocals
- Jeff Johnson - bass guitar
- Perry Baggs - drums, vocals

=== Technical ===
- Tom Werman - producer
- Duane Baron - engineer
- Brian Scheuble - 2nd engineer
- David Eaton - 2nd engineer
- Steve Scruggs - 2nd engineer

Recorded at Cherokee Studios, Los Angeles, Scruggs Sound Studio, Berry Hill

Mastered at Artisan Sound
