= For the First Time (Darius Rucker song) =

Single by Darius Rucker

from the album When Was the Last Time
- Released: July 24, 2017
- Genre: Country
- Length: 3:17
- Label: Capitol Nashville
- Songwriters: Darius Rucker; Derek George; Scooter Carusoe
- Producer: Ross Copperman

Darius Rucker singles chronology
| "If I Told You" (2016) | "For the First Time" (2017) | "Straight to Hell" (2018) |

"For the First Time" is a song co-written and recorded by American country music artist Darius Rucker. It was released to radio on July 24, 2017 as the second single from his fifth country studio album, When Was the Last Time. Rucker wrote the song with Derek George and Scooter Carusoe.

== Commercial performance ==
The song has sold 90,000 copies in the United States as of June 2018. It was certified Platinum by Recording Industry Association of America (RIAA) in 2021 for equivalent sales of 1,000,000 units.

== Music video ==
The music video was directed by Jim Wright and premiered in October 2017.

== Chart performance ==
=== Weekly charts ===
| Chart (2017–2018) | Peak position |
|---|---|
| Canada Country (Billboard) | 6 |
| US Billboard Hot 100 | 58 |
| US Hot Country Songs (Billboard) | 7 |
| US Country Airplay (Billboard) | 1 |

=== Year-end charts ===
| Chart (2018) | Position |
|---|---|
| US Country Airplay (Billboard) | 8 |
| US Hot Country Songs (Billboard) | 40 |

== Certifications ==
| Region | Certification | Certified units/sales |
|---|---|---|
| United States (RIAA) | Platinum | 1,000,000^{‡} |
^{‡} Sales+streaming figures based on certification alone.
