= Southern Style (song) =

Single by Darius Rucker

from the album Southern Style
- Released: May 4, 2015
- Genre: Country
- Length: 3:58
- Label: Capitol Nashville
- Songwriter(s): Darius Rucker; Tim James; Rivers Rutherford
- Producer(s): Frank Rogers

Darius Rucker singles chronology
"Homegrown Honey" (2014)	"Southern Style" (2015)	"If I Told You" (2016)

"Southern Style" is a song recorded by American country music artist Darius Rucker. It was released to radio on May 4, 2015 as the second single from his fourth country studio album of the same name. The song was written by Rucker along with Tim James and Rivers Rutherford.

== Critical reception ==
Website Taste of Country reviewed the single favorably, saying that "The title track from Darius Rucker’s Southern Style album is thick with imagery. Not since Buddy Jewell’s “Sweet Southern Comfort” has a song about the South been so easy to embrace."

== Music video ==
The music video was directed by Peter Zavadil and premiered in July 2015.

== Chart performance ==
Chart (2015)	Peak position
US Hot Country Songs (Billboard)	38
US Country Airplay (Billboard)	33
