= Fervor EP =

EP by Jason & the Scorchers
- Released: 1983
- Genres: Country rock, alt.country, cowpunk
- Label: EMI America
- Producers: Jim Dickinson, Terry Manning

Jason & the Scorchers chronology
Restless Country Soul EP (1982)	Fervor EP (1983)	White Lies (1985)

Fervor EP is a 1983 EP by Jason & the Scorchers. Originally released by Praxis, it was expanded and rereleased by EMI the following year.

== Production ==
Ringenberg convinced the band to record Bob Dylan's "Absolutely Sweet Marie" after claiming that he was the author of the song.

== Critical reception ==
Professional ratings
Review scores
Source	Rating
AllMusic	4.5/5 stars
Robert Christgau	A−
The Encyclopedia of Popular Music	3/5 stars

The Guardian wrote that the EP was "cleaner and better" than the debut, calling the Dylan cover "a staggeringly exciting version."

== Track listing ==
1. "Absolutely Sweet Marie" (Bob Dylan) – 3:09
2. "Help There's a Fire" (Jason Ringenberg) – 2:26
3. "I Can't Help Myself" (Tim Krekel) – 2:51
4. "Hot Nights in Georgia" (Jeff Johnson, Ringenberg) – 2:28
5. "Pray for Me, Mama (I'm a Gypsy Now)" (Johnson, Ringenberg) – 3:49
6. "Harvest Moon" (Ringenberg) – 3:19
7. "Both Sides of the Line" (Ringenberg, Michael Stipe) – 3:47

== Charts ==
Chart (1985)	Peak position
US Billboard 200	157

== Personnel ==
- Jason Ringenberg - guitar, harmonica, vocals
- Perry Baggs – drums, vocals
- Warner Hodges – electric guitar, steel guitar, vocals
- Jeff Johnson – guitar, bass
- Michael Stipe - harmony vocals on "Hot Nights in Georgia"

Technical

- Terry Manning – producer, engineer
- Charlie Ainley - engineer
- Richard Rosebrough – engineer
- Jack Emerson - executive producer
