= Drivin N Cryin =

American rock band

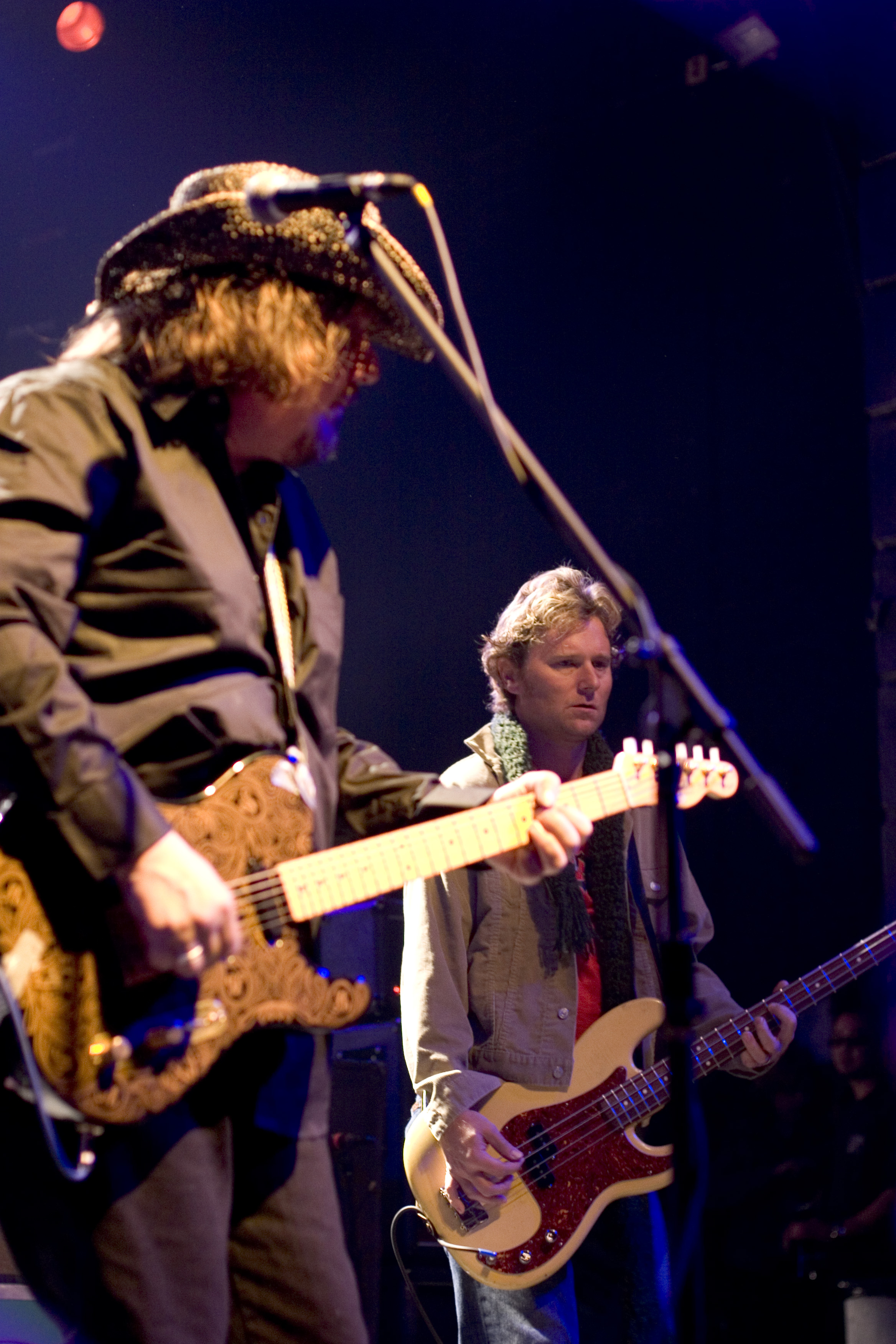
- Drivin' N Cryin' at the Roxy November 25, 2005

Background information
- Origin: Atlanta, Georgia, United States
- Genres: Roots rock; Southern rock; hard rock
- Years active: 1985–present
- Labels: Island; Geffen
- Members: Kevn Kinney; Tim Nielsen; Dave V. Johnson; Laur Joamets
- Past members: Jeff Sullivan; Sadler Vaden; Frank French; Joey Huffman; Paul Lenz; Buren Fowler; David Franklin; Mac Carter; Aaron Lee Tasjan
- Website: www.drivinncryin.com

Drivin N Cryin is an American rock band from Atlanta, Georgia.

== History ==
The band was formed in 1985, soon after Kevn Kinney had relocated to Atlanta from Milwaukee. Kinney was working at a sewage treatment plant by day, and was playing folk music at night. He met Frank French at the latter's recording studio, Dragon Path Music, and the two soon began writing original songs at night, sometimes while working at French's shop, Far East Futon Company. Kinney also joined forces with Tim Nielsen, who was in a popular band called the Nightporters, with drummer Paul Lenz. The band's name, Drivin N Cryin was chosen from one of Kinney's many songs that reflected the two directions of the band's music.

In 1986, having become one of Atlanta's top club draws, the band signed with independent label 688 Records. The band's first album, Scarred But Smarter, helped them land many tour dates and later a contract with Island Records. In 1987, Lenz left and was replaced by Jeff Sullivan, who was recruited just in time to accompany the band for its first major-label release. Sullivan had been the drummer for Mr. Crowes Garden, which later became The Black Crowes, prior to joining Drivin N Cryin. The same year, the band held its first Benefit For The Hopeful, a concert to raise money for Atlanta homeless organizations, held annually on December 8, the anniversary of John Lennon's death. Fellow Georgia band R.E.M.'s guitar tech and touring rhythm guitarist Buren Fowler joined the trio at this time as well. Fowler was officially asked to join the band on a more permanent level (though not as an official member) in 1988, after many on-stage appearances with the group.

The band released its first album for Island, Whisper Tames the Lion, produced by Anton Fier, in early 1988. The album peaked at No. 130 on the Billboard 200. College radio success (and some commercial) accumulated with airplay of the songs "Can't Promise You The World" (for which the band filmed its first video) and "Powerhouse".

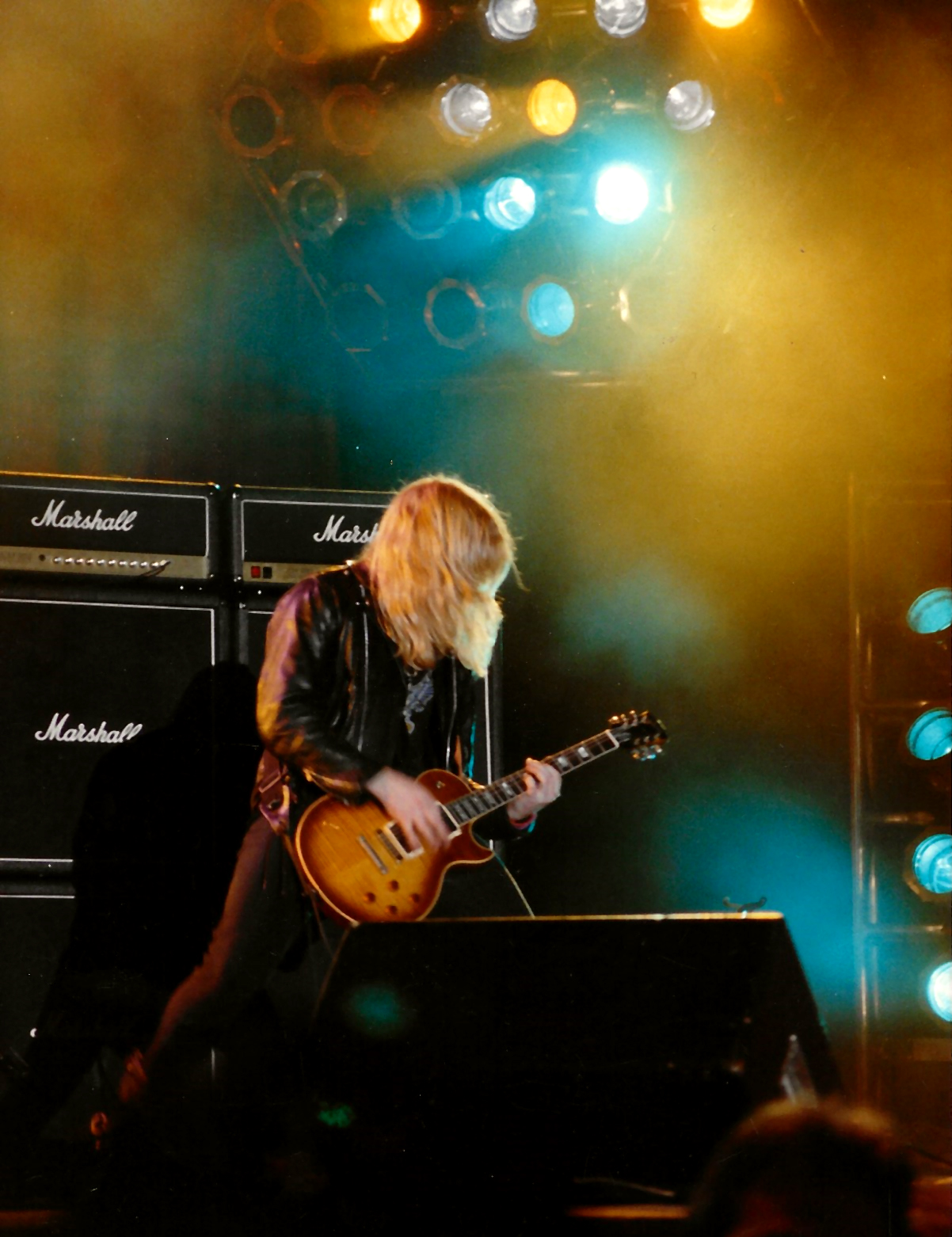
Guitarist Buren Fowler performing with the band in 1992

1989 marked the release of Mystery Road, including live staples such as "Honeysuckle Blue" and "Straight To Hell". In 1991, the band released the hard-rocking Fly Me Courageous. Produced by Geoff Workman, the album became the band's most commercially successful album and would be certified gold. The next few years the band toured with artists such as Neil Young and Soul Asylum. In 1993, the band released another album produced by Geoff Workman, entitled Smoke, which peaked at No. 95 on the Billboard's Top 200 album chart. This album was another rocker, but failed to catch on with the public as had its predecessor.

In 1994, the band decided to move away from the heavy guitar sounds of the previous two records and brought in keyboardist Joey Huffman to replace Buren Fowler. That same year the band left Island Records and found a new home at Geffen Records. The band's first and only Geffen album, 1995's Wrapped in Sky, featured newly added keyboard sounds and a return to the band's original sound.

1997 brought a self-titled album, followed two years later by a live album, The Essential Live Drivin' 'N' Cryin'. In 2000, the band released The Ultimate Collection, a best-of collection. In 2003, the band released a four-song EP, Detroit City Rock, which featured a cover of the Beatles "Let It Be", recorded in New York City on September 13, 2001. The band released its first full studio album in 12 years, The Great American Bubble Factory on September 29, 2009. In 2011, the Georgia General Assembly commended Drivin' N' Cryin' in a house resolution for the band's achievements.

Starting in 2012, the band began a series of EPs, each composed of tracks addressing a particular theme. The first, Songs from the Laundromat was released June 12, followed by Songs About Cars, Space and The Ramones on September 18. On March 5, 2013, Songs From The Psychedelic Time Clock was released. The final release of the EP series was Songs For The Turntable, released January 14, 2014.

In 2012, a documentary about the band titled Scarred but Smarter: Life n Times of Drivin N Cryin was produced by Atlanta radio host, Eric Von Haessler (The Von Haessler Doctrine).

In 2015, Drivin N Cryin was inducted into the Georgia Music Hall of Fame. In 2016 the band supported Dan Baird & Homemade Sin on the UK leg of their European tour and were augmented again by guitarist Warner E. Hodges.

Kevn Kinney has also maintained a solo career over the years. He released his first solo album, the acoustic MacDougal Blues in 1990. This was followed by Down Out Law in 1994, and The Flower And The Knife in 2000. The latter featured guests such as Blues Traveler's John Popper, Edwin McCain, and members of Gov't Mule and the Allman Brothers Band. He has released five more solo albums since, and frequently performs live as a solo artist, including live collaborations with Peter Buck of R.E.M.

== Discography ==
=== Studio albums ===
- Scarred but Smarter (October 1986)
- Whisper Tames the Lion (June 1988) U.S. Billboard 200 No. 130
- Mystery Road (March 1989)
- Fly Me Courageous (January 1991) U.S. No. 90
- Smoke (February 1993) U.S. No. 95
- Wrapped in Sky (August 1995)
- Drivin' 'n' Cryin' (August 1997)
- The Great American Bubble Factory (September 2009)
- Too Late to Turn Back Now! (July 2018, self-titled 1997 album, remastered with a different title)
- Live the Love Beautiful (June 2019)
- Crushing Flowers (March 2026)

=== Live albums ===
- Essential Live (September 1999)
- Live the Love Beautiful Live (January 2020)

=== Compilations ===
- Ultimate Collection (August 2000)
- Best of Songs (April 2016)

=== Extended plays ===
- Live on Fire (EP, March 1991; live tracks from Six Flags Over Georgia)
- Detroit City Rock (EP, September 2003)
- Songs from the Laundromat (EP, June 2012)
- Songs About Cars, Space and The Ramones (EP, September 2012)
- Songs from the Psychedelic Time Clock (EP, March 2013)
- Songs for the Turntable (EP, January 2014)

=== Singles ===
| Year | Title | US Chart positions | | Album |
| Year | Title | Mod Rock | Main Rock | Album |
|---|---|---|---|---|
| 1988 | "Powerhouse" | — | — | Whisper Tames the Lion |
| 1988 | "Can't Promise You the World" | — | — | Whisper Tames the Lion |
| 1989 | "Straight to Hell" | — | — | Mystery Road |
| 1989 | "Honeysuckle Blue" | — | — | Mystery Road |
| 1989 | "Wild Dog Moon" | — | — | Mystery Road |
| 1990 | "Fly Me Courageous" | 15 | 19 | Fly Me Courageous |
| 1991 | "Build a Fire" | — | 15 | Fly Me Courageous |
| 1991 | "The Innocent" | — | 31 | Fly Me Courageous |
| 1992 | "Around the Block Again" | — | — | Fly Me Courageous |
| 1993 | "Smoke" | — | 23 | Smoke |
| 1993 | "Turn It Up or Turn It Off" | — | 11 | Smoke |
| 1995 | "Light" | — | — | Wrapped in Sky |
| 1995 | "Telling Stories" | — | — | Wrapped in Sky |
| 1997 | "Paid in Full" | — | — | Drivin' N' Cryin' |
| 1997 | "Let Lenny B" | — | — | Drivin' N' Cryin' |
