= Jason & the Scorchers =

American cowpunk band

Jason & The Scorchers
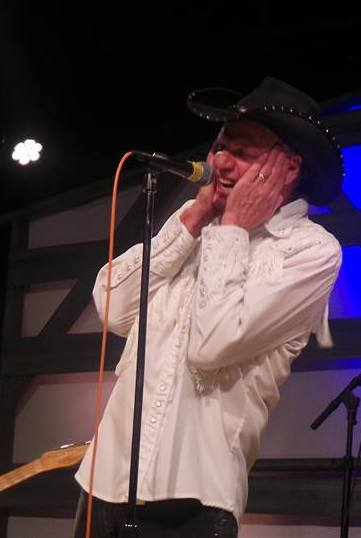
- Frontman Jason Ringenberg performing in Franklin, Tennessee, 2015

Background information
- Also known as: Jason & The Nashville Scorchers
- Origin: Nashville, Tennessee, United States
- Genres: Cowpunk; punk rock; alt-country; Americana
- Years active: 1981–1990; 1993-2007; 2010–2019; 2024–present
- Labels: Praxis (1981–1983); EMI (1983–1987); Mammoth (1997–1999); Courageous Chicken
- Members: Jason Ringenberg; Warner E. Hodges
- Past members: Jeff Johnson; Andy York; Ken Fox; Kenny Ames; Perry Baggs; Al Collins; Jon Brant; Pontus Snibb
- Website: jasonandthescorchers.com

Jason & the Scorchers, originally Jason & the Nashville Scorchers, are a cowpunk band that formed in 1981 and are led by singer-songwriter Jason Ringenberg.

With a sound that combines punk rock and country music, Jason and the Scorchers are noted for their energetic live performances and have earned strong reviews from critics, including Mark Deming, who declared they "blazed a trail for the cowpunk and alt-country movements that followed in their wake."

Jason and the Scorchers have maintained a worldwide fan-base around the world since their debut. Jason and the Scorchers released their latest album, Halcyon Times, in February 2010.

== History ==
=== Early days ===
A native of Sheffield, Illinois, Ringenberg attended Southern Illinois University at Carbondale and was a member of a short-lived acoustic trio in 1978. In late 1979, Ringenberg formed his first band, Shakespeare's Riot, the precursor of the Scorchers. Named after an oblique reference to the Astor Place Riot, Shakespeare's Riot played Ringenberg's original compositions, rockabilly songs, and other similar-styled tunes by Bob Dylan and Tom Petty; adapted to his high-energy country rock style.

Ringenberg disbanded Shakespeare's Riot and moved to Nashville in 1981. He was introduced to his original Scorcher bandmates through the independent Praxis record label, and the group soon established a reputation among indie rock circles. Jason and the Scorchers played a high-energy music somewhat unprecedented in Nashville, Tennessee.

=== Debut EP ===
The Scorchers released their debut D.I.Y. EP, Reckless Country Soul, in 1982 on the independent Praxis label.

=== Fervor with EMI ===
EMI signed the Scorchers in 1983, and producer/engineer Terry Manning was brought into the band. A second EP was released with the title Fervor. ock critics from noted publications began to take notice. of their popularity Robert Christgau praised Fervor in his "Consumer Guide" column, writing that "crossing Gram Parsons's knowledge of sin with Joe Ely's hellbent determination to get away with it, Jason Ringenberg leads a band no one can accuse of fecklessness, dabbling, revivalism, or undue irony. The lyrics strain against their biblical poetry at times, but anyone who hopes to take a popsicle into a disco is in no immediate danger of expiring pretentiousness."

Fervor earned critical praise, placing at No. 3 on The Village Voice's Pazz & Jop Critics Poll for 1983.

=== Lost & Found and Still Standing ===
The Scorchers quickly followed Fervor with two full-length LPs: Lost & Found, produced by Terry Manning, and Still Standing, produced by Tom Werman.

In 1987, the band toured Australia during the Still Standing 1987 Tour and the band were watched by Angus and Malcolm Young of AC/DC at the St. George Sailing Club during this tour. 1987 was also the year that EMI dropped the Scorchers from its label, and Jeff Johnson left the band and was replaced by Ken Fox.

=== Thunder and Fire and disbandment ===
After a three-year "fallow period," the Scorchers released a third LP, Thunder and Fire, which was more hard rock. Reviews were mixed, and sales were disappointing. After the Scorchers disbanded, Ringenberg turned to country-oriented solo work, Hodges moved to Los Angeles to work in the video business, Johnson moved to Atlanta to work in the auto and motorcycle repair business, Baggs remained in Nashville, working on Christian music projects, and Fox joined The Fleshtones.

=== Compact disc retrospective ===
A few years later, EMI Records hired Jimmy Guterman to compile a compact disc retrospective of the Scorchers' music. A single compact disc containing 22 tracks, Are You Ready for the Country?: The Essential Jason and the Scorchers, Volume 1 was issued in the fall of 1992, including all of Fervor, Lost and Found, and four rarities. (Reportedly, plans for a second volume never materialized.) Jon Brant played on two songs recorded live in 1988 on this compilation. It fell out of print years later, replaced by a shorter compilation that excluded all of the rarities, but it helped introduce the Scorchers to a new generation of listeners who were experiencing a different musical landscape.

=== 1990s reunion ===
The group reunited and began touring in 1993. As a part of the agreement to tour, no songs from Thunder and Fire were played on this tour, as Johnson was not a member of the band at the time it was recorded. A demo tape of new recordings was also made that year, and the band secured a new contract with Mammoth Records in Chapel Hill, North Carolina. The band released a new album in 1995, titled A Blazing Grace, which returned them to their original sound. The Scorchers released another new record, Clear Impetuous Morning, in 1996. In 1997, Jeff Johnson amicably departed from the band; he was replaced by Kenny Ames, of Fredericksburg, Virginia. A live album, Midnight Roads and Stages Seen, was recorded that November and released in May 1998.

In 1999, Walt Disney Records folded Mammoth Records, two years after buying them out, leaving the Scorchers without a label. Since then, the band independently released a live concert from 1985 on Ringenberg's own homemade label, Courageous Chicken Records. Titled Rock on Germany, it was released in 2001. In 2002, Courageous Chicken Records released Wildfires and Misfires: Two Decades of Outtakes and Rarities, which contained much previously unreleased material from throughout the band's history.

=== Reunion and release of Halcyon Times ===
Due to the success of concerts performed in the U.S. and throughout Europe, Jason and the Scorchers briefly reunited with original members Jason Ringenberg and Warner Hodges in 2010. Bassist Al Collins and drummer Pontus Snibb were added to the band. They then toured in support of the Jason and the Scorchers album Halcyon Times, which was released on March 2, 2010. One of the lead tracks on the record, "Golden Days", was written by Ringenberg with two friends from the British rock band The Wildhearts. Although Ringenberg does not consider it autobiographical, it is his favorite, he states. The lyrics reflect a rocker who grows up and continues to perform even with a family.

=== Recent years ===
Drummer Perry Baggs died on 12 July 2012 from diabetes at the age of 50.

Founding bassist Jeff Johnson suffered a stroke in Mexico on September 19, 2023. Ringenberg and Hodges reunited as the Scorchers to headline a benefit show in Nashville on January 27, 2024, their first show together since 2019, and their first Nashville show in more than twelve years.

== Later activities ==
Ringenberg now performs as Farmer Jason, playing children's music. He also performs solo, playing his own material and some of the Scorchers' classics. In June 2007, Jason & the Scorchers reunited for a Perry Baggs benefit show in Nashville at Exit/In.

The band performed for several shows in Scandinavia and Britain in May 2008. This coincided with a couple of solo shows from Ringenberg, Farmer Jason, and Warner E. Hodges. There was also a US show at the Flood City Music Festival in Johnstown, Pennsylvania on Labor Day weekend in 2008. Warner E. Hodges is a full-time member of Dan Baird & Homemade Sin. They toured Europe in October 2007, and released a new Homemade Sin album in May 2008 on the Jerkin Crocus record label.

In 2007, Warner E. Hodges, Kenny Ames, and Fenner Castner played four UK shows under the name Ginger and The Scorchers, with Wildhearts frontman Ginger on vocals. In September 2010, Ringenberg reunited with Shakespeare's Riot bandmates Gary Gibula and Tom Miller for brief performances at a coffeehouse and an outdoor pavilion in Carbondale, Illinois.

Former drummer and songwriter Perry Baggs became an archivist at The Tennessean, where he was employed for 17 years. He also played bass guitar with the Scottsboro First Baptist Church Praise Band. He died at his home on July 12, 2012, after a 22-year battle with diabetes. He was working on a gospel album Hymns for Him at the time of his death.

== Awards ==
In 2008, Jason and the Scorchers received the Americana Music Association's Lifetime Achievement Award in the Performance Category. The band performed during the Annual Awards Show at Nashville's famed Ryman Auditorium. Bassist Jeff Johnson participated at this event, the first time that all four of the original band members played together on stage since January 19, 1997, when the Scorchers played Club Zydeco in Birmingham, Alabama. Guitarist Warner Hodges and Jason Ringenberg led a modified version of the Scorchers through a full set at the Mercy Lounge in Nashville after the Americana awards.

== Discography ==
=== Jason & the Scorchers ===
- Reckless Country Soul EP (1982)
- Fervor EP (1983)
- Lost & Found (1985)
- Still Standing (1986)
- Thunder and Fire (1989)
- Essential Jason & the Scorchers – Are You Ready For The Country? (1992)
- A Blazing Grace (1995)
- Both Sides of the Line (1996)
- Clear Impetuous Morning (1996)
- Reckless Country Soul (1998)
- Midnight Roads & Stages Seen (1998)
- Rock on Germany (2001)
- Wildfires and Misfires (2001)
- Still Standing (2002) – Re-release
- Lost And Found/Fervor (2008)
- Halcyon Times (2010)

Awards
Preceded by Joe Ely	AMA Lifetime Achievement Award for Performing; 2008	Succeeded by Asleep at the Wheel
