= MacDougal Blues =

Studio album by Kevn Kinney
- Released: January 1990
- Recorded: 1989
- Studio: John Keane Studios, Athens, Georgia, United States
- Genre: folk rock; roots rock
- Length: 39:56
- Language: English
- Label: Island
- Producer: Peter Buck

Kevn Kinney chronology
MacDougal Blues (1990)	Down Out Law (1994)

MacDougal Blues is the debut solo album from Drivin N Cryin vocalist Kevn Kinney, released on Island Records in 1990. The album received positive reviews.

== Release and reception ==
After the album's January 1990 release, Kinney toured with producer Peter Buck the following month. The musical output of that tour encouraged Kinney and the other members of Drivin N Cryin to move from a hard rock/Southern rock sound to a more folk rock style. Buck found the experience to be enjoyable and one of his favorite production jobs.

Denise Sullivan of AllMusic Guide gave the album a positive review for Kinney's songwriting, and the editorial staff awarded the album 4.5 out of five stars. Spin's Karen Schoemer compared the album favorably to Bob Dylan and included it in the magazine's "Heavy Rotation" column.

== Track listing ==
All songs written by Kevn Kinney, except where noted

1. "MacDougal Blues" – 3:54
2. "Not Afraid to Die" – 4:48
3. "Lost and Found" (Kinney and Tim Nielsen) – 4:22
4. "Heard the Laughter Ending" – 4:09
5. "Last Song of Maddie Hope" – 3:47
6. "Gotta Get Out of Here" – 4:56
7. "The House Above Tina's Grocery" – 2:13
8. "Iron Mountain" (Buren Fowler, Kinney, Neilsen, and Jeff Sullivan) – 4:20
9. "Chico and Maria" – 3:00
10. "Hey Landlord (Meatloaf and Fishsticks)" (Randy Blazak, Danado Giordano, and Kevn Kinney) – 3:06
11. "Goodnight Rhyme" – 1:16

== Personnel ==
- Kevn Kinney – vocals, guitar, harmonica
- Audrey Bernstein – photography
- David Blackmon – fiddle
- Peter Buck – dulcimer, guitar, mandolin, production, mixing
- Buren Fowler – guitar, pedal steel guitar, banjo
- Ted Jensen – mastering at Sterling Sound
- Nita Karpf – cello
- John Keane – engineering, mixing, guitar, electric slide guitar, bass guitar, banjo, percussion
- Sue Kinney – backing vocals on "Lost and Found", "Chico & Maria", and "Goodnight Rhyme"
- Ruth Leitman – photography
- Mike Mills – walking whistle on "Chico & Maria"
- Joel Morris – marimba
- Moira Nelligan – accordion, fiddle, and backing vocals on "Iron Mountain"
- Tim Nielsen – bass guitar, mandolin
- George Norman – mandolin
- Barbara Panter-Connah – fiddle
- Kyle Pilgrim – double bass
- Jennifer Sproul – hammer dulcimer
- Jeff Sullivan – drums, percussion
- Judy Troilo – art direction
