= Jason Ringenberg =

American singer-songwriter (born 1958)

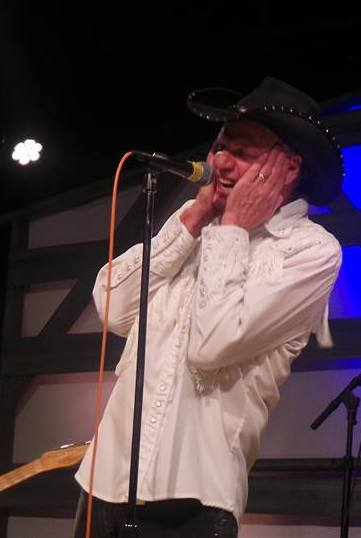
- Ringenberg performs at Music City Roots in Franklin, Tennessee in 2015

Background information
- Also known as: Farmer Jason
- Born: November 22, 1958 (age 67); Kewanee, Illinois U.S.
- Genres: Country rock Alt-country; Americana; Cowpunk
- Occupations: Musician singer-songwriter
- Instruments: Guitar voice
- Years active: 1980–present
- Labels: EMI; Mammoth Records; Yep Roc Records
- Member of: Jason & the Scorchers
- Website: JasonRingenberg.com; FarmerJason.com

Jason Ringenberg (born November 22, 1958) is an American musician, singer-songwriter, and guitarist and the lead singer of Jason & the Scorchers. The band had several hits, including "Golden Ball and Chain" and a rock version of Bob Dylan's "Absolutely Sweet Marie."

== Early life and education ==
Ringenberg was born in Kewanee, Illinois, and grew up in nearby Sheffield, Illinois, where his parents owned a family hog farm that bordered the Rock Island Railroad line. He started playing in rock, alternative rock, and country-bands while in school at Southern Illinois University Carbondale.

== Career ==
In 1981, Ringenberg moved to Nashville, Tennessee, where he soon formed Jason & the Scorchers with Warner Hodges, Jeff Johnson, and Perry Baggs. They used a mix of punk rock and country. Rolling Stone has commented that they "singlehandedly re-wrote the history of rock'n'roll in the South". They won critical approval with the release of several albums and live performances.

Ringenberg was influential in the early to mid 1980s when the indie country/rock movement was at its height. His music, along with similar bands, founded the emergence of the alternative country and Americana genres within indie rock music.

In 2008, Jason & the Scorchers received the Americana Music Association's Lifetime Achievement Award in the Performance Category.

Ringenberg has also seen success as a solo artist. He has released five solo records and toured as a solo artist. The Times (London) called him "one of the most exciting performers of his generation." He now performs both solo as Jason Ringenberg and as his children's music character, Farmer Jason, often performing as both personas in the same day.

Ringenberg created his children's music character, Farmer Jason, in 2002 to entertain his own daughters. He then released his first children's record on the Yep Roc Records label; A Day at the Farm with Farmer Jason, in 2003. The character remains popular and has become the most successful project of his career. As Farmer Jason, he sings songs about farm animals and the appreciation of nature. His PBS mini program called "It's a Farmer Jason" has earned four Emmy nominations and one Emmy win. He has recorded four records and a DVD as Farmer Jason. The fourth album, Christmas on the Farm with Farmer Jason, was released in December 2014.

His album Stand Tall (2019) was written while he was Artist in Residence at Sequoia National Park. Recorded at his old college haunts in Southern Illinois and also in Nashville, the subjects of the songs range from John the Baptist to The Ramones to a disillusioned Confederate draftee.

== Personal life ==
Ringenberg lives near Bon Aqua, Tennessee, with his wife Suzy; daughters, and a barnyard full of animals.

== Discography ==
=== Jason & The Scorchers ===
- Reckless Country Soul (Praxis, 1982). EP
- Fervor (Praxis, 1983), rereleased in 1984 for EMI.
- Lost & Found (EMI, 1986).
- Still Standing (EMI, 1986).
- Thunder and Fire (A&M, 1989).
- Are You Ready for the Country: The Essential Jason & The Scorchers. Volume One (EMI, 1992)
- A Blazing Grace (Mammoth, 1995).
- Clear Impetuous Morning (Mammoth, 1996).
- Both Sides of The Line (EMI, 1996)
- Midnight Roads and Stages Seen (Mammoth, 1998)
- Rock on Germany (Courageous Chicken Music, 2001)
- Wildfires & Misfires: Two Decades of Outtakes and Rarities (Courageous Chicken, 2002).
- Halcyon Times (Courageous Chicken, 2010).

=== Solo ===
- One Foot in the Honky Tonk (Liberty, 1992)
- A Pocketful of Soul (2000)
- All Over Creation (2002)
- Empire Builders (2004)
- Best Tracks and Side Tracks (2008)
- Stand Tall (2019)
- Rhinestoned (2021)

=== As Farmer Jason ===
- A Day at the Farm With Farmer Jason (2003)
- Rockin' In The Forest With Farmer Jason (2006)
- Nature Jams (2012)
- Christmas on the Farm with Farmer Jason (2014)
