= Kevn Kinney =

American musician (born 1961)

- Born: Kevin Kinney; March 12, 1961 (age 65)
- Origin: Milwaukee, Wisconsin
- Genres: Southern rock, roots rock, folk rock
- Instruments: Guitar, vocals
- Years active: 1985–present

Kevin Kinney, known professionally as Kevn Kinney (born March 12, 1961), is an American vocalist and guitarist, best known as lead singer and guitarist of rock band Drivin N Cryin.

== Biography ==
A native of Milwaukee, Wisconsin, Kinney formed Drivin N Cryin with bassist Tim Nielsen and drummer Paul Lenz after moving to Atlanta, Georgia in 1985. Kinney and his bandmates remained a part of the Atlanta underground rock scene until the album Fly Me Courageous, and its hit-single title track, brought them to a national audience on mainstream rock radio. A prolific songwriter, collaborator and performer, Kinney has been noted for his numerous side projects throughout his career, all while keeping Drivin N Cryin an active band. As a solo artist, he recorded the 1990 folk rock album MacDougal Blues with members of R.E.M., followed by Down Out Law in 1994. Kinney's 2000 album The Flower & the Knife was recorded with various members of the jam-band scene, including Warren Haynes and John Popper. Starting in 2002, he formed the project "Sun Tangled Angel Revival" (S.T.A.R.) to release Americana and roots rock music. In 2011, Kinney released an album with The Golden Palominos, a long-standing musical collaborative project headed by Anton Fier.

== Partial discography ==
- MacDougal Blues, 1990
- Down Out Law, 1994
- The Flower and the Knife, 2000
- Main Street, 2000
- Broken Hearts and Auto Parts, 2002
- Sun Tangled Angel Revival, 2004
- Comin' Round Again, 2006 (credited to Kevn Kinney's S.T.A.R.)
- Pre-Approved, Pre-Denied, 2009
- A Good Country Mile, 2011 (credited to Kevn Kinney and The Golden Palominos)
- Think About It, 2022
