= Nathan Carter discography =

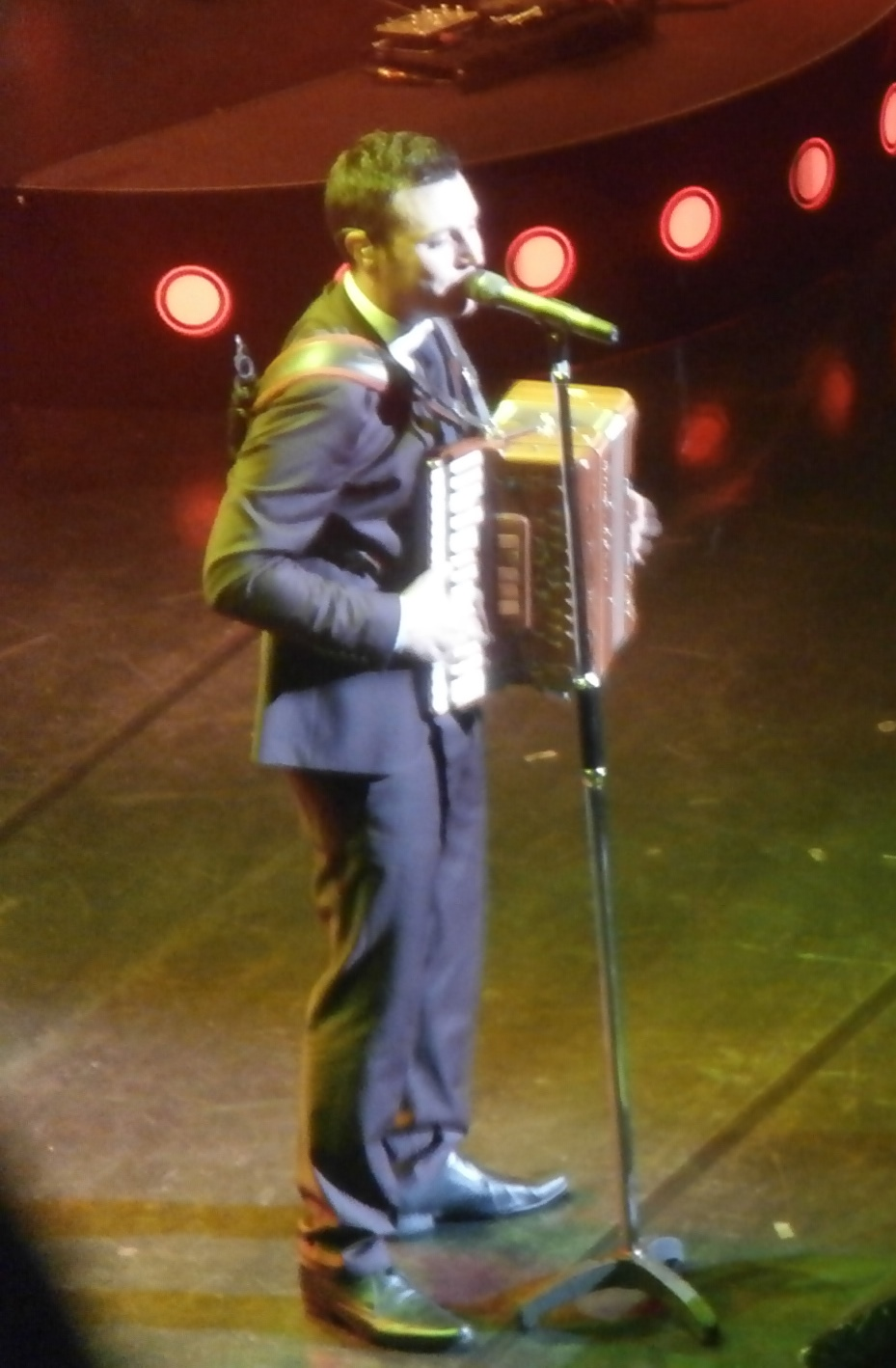
- Nathan Carter at the Glasgow Royal Concert Hall in September 2014.
- Studio albums: 15
- Live albums: 6
- Singles: 14
- Music videos: 5

The discography of Nathan Carter, an English-Irish country singer, consists of fifteen studio albums, six live albums and fourteen singles.

== Albums ==
=== Studio albums ===
Title	Details	Peak chart positions		
Title	Details	IRE	IRE Indie	UK
Starting Out	Released: 2007; Label: Sharpe Music; Formats: Digital download, CD	—	—	—
The Way You Love Me	Released: 1 November 2010; Label: Sharpe Music; Formats: Digital download, CD	—	—	—
Time of My Life	Released: 11 July 2011; Label: Sharpe Music; Formats: Digital download, CD	—	—	—
Wagon Wheel	Released: 20 November 2012; Label: Decca Records, Sharpe Music; Formats: Digital download, CD	6	3	—
Where I Wanna Be	Released: 26 August 2013; Label: Decca Records, Sharpe Music; Formats: Digital download, CD	1	4	—
Christmas Stuff	Released: 8 December 2014; Label: Decca; Formats: Digital download, CD	8	—	—
Beautiful Life	Released: 4 May 2015; Label: Decca; Formats: Digital download, CD	1	—	34
Stayin' Up All Night	Released: 29 April 2016; Label: Decca; Formats: Digital download, CD	1	—	31
Livin' the Dream	Released: 16 June 2017; Label: Decca; Formats: Digital download, CD	1	—	51
Born for the Road	Released: 12 October 2018; Label: Sharpe Music; Formats: Digital download, CD	3	—	—
Irish Heartland	Released: 8 November 2019; Label: Sharpe Music; Formats: Digital download, CD	14	—	—
Little Old Town	Released: 26 November 2021; Label: Sharpe Music; Formats: Digital download, CD	20	—	—
The Morning After	Released: 9 December 2022; Label: Sharpe Music; Formats: Digital download, CD	10	—	—
Music Man	Released: 8 December 2023; Label: Sharpe Music; Formats: Digital download, CD	2	—	—
Crazy Christmas	Released: 6 December 2024; Label: Sharpe Music; Formats: Digital download, CD	27	—	—
"—" denotes an album that did not chart or was not released in that territory.

=== Live albums ===
Title	Details	Peak chart positions
Title	Details	IRE
The Live Show	Released: 16 April 2012; Label: Sharpe Music; Formats: Digital download, CD	—
The Wagon Wheel Show – Live	Released: February 2014; Label: Sharpe Music; Formats: Digital download, CD	1
Live at the Marquee	Released: 16 November 2015; Label: Nathan Carter Music Group; Formats: Digital download, CD	9
Live at the Marquee Cork	Released: 25 August 2017; Label: Nathan Carter Music Group; Formats: Digital download, CD	—
Celtic Roots	Released: 25 August 2017; Label: Nathan Carter Music Group; Formats: Digital download, CD	—
Live at 3Arena	Released: 17 November 2017; Label: Sharpe Music; Formats: Digital download, CD	26
"—" denotes an album that did not chart or was not released in that territory.

=== Compilation albums ===
Title	Details	Peak chart positions
Title	Details	IRE
The Best of the First 10 Years – Anniversary Collection	Released: 12 November 2020; Label: Sharpe Music; Formats: Digital download, CD	21

== Singles ==
=== As lead artist ===
Year	Title	Peak chart positions	Album
Year	Title	IRE	Album
2012	"Wagon Wheel"	14	Wagon Wheel
2013	"Caledonia"	—	Wagon Wheel
2013	"Where I Wanna Be"	—	Where I Wanna Be
2013	"Boys of Summer"	96	Where I Wanna Be
2014	"On the Boat to Liverpool"	95	Beautiful Life
2015	"Good Morning Beautiful"	—	Beautiful Life
2016	"Temple Bar"	—	Stayin' Up All Night
2016	"Liverpool"	—	Stayin' Up All Night
2017	"Livin' the Dream"	—	Livin' the Dream
2017	"Christmas to Me"	—	Non-album singles
2018	"This Song Is for You"	—	Non-album singles
2018	"Give It to Me"	—	Born For the Road
2018	"Winnie O'Neill"	—	Born For the Road
2019	"Gone Girls"	—	Non-album single
2019	"May the Road Rise to Meet You" (featuring The High Kings)	—	Irish Heartland
2020	"#Stay At Home Stay Alive" (with Johnny Logan, Brian Kennedy, Chloë Agnew, Tommy Fleming & Seán Keane)	—	Non-album charity single
2020	"Sarah Jane"	—	The Best of the First 10 Years – Anniversary Collection
2021	"Wings to Fly"	—	Little Old Town
2021	"Rambling Rover"	—	Little Old Town
2021	"You Got Gold"	—	Little Old Town
"—" denotes a single that did not chart or was not released in that territory.

=== As featured artist ===
Year	Title	Album
2013	"Don't Leave Behind a Broken Heart" (P.J. Murrihy featuring Nathan Carter & Cherish the Ladies)	Non-album singles
2015	"You Can't Make Old Friends" (Lisa McHugh featuring Nathan Carter)	Non-album singles
2017	"Burning Bridges" (Foster & Allen & Nathan Carter)	Non-album singles
2018	"Heart of the Home" (Cherish the Ladies featuring Nathan Carter)	Non-album singles

=== Promotional singles ===
Year	Title	Peak chart positions	Album
Year	Title	IRE	Album
2012	"One for the Road"	—	Time of My Life
2013	"Wagon Wheel" (Radio Dance Mix) (with Micky Modelle)	—	Non-album singles
2013	"The Town I Loved So Well"	—	Non-album singles
2014	"Simple Life"	73	Non-album singles
2014	"Good Time Girls"	40	Stayin' Up All Night
2015	"Good Luck to the Girl"	—	Non-album single
"—" denotes a single that did not chart or was not released in that territory.

=== DVDs ===
Year	Title	Track listing
2012	The Live Show: Recorded at The Burnavon Theatre, Cookstown, County Tyrone, Northern Ireland	No. / Title / Length; 1. / "Games People Play"; 2. / "Buck Owens Medley"; 3. / "Time of Your Life"; 4. / "Walk Right Back"; 5. / "Beatles Medley"; 6. / "Take Another Little Piece of My Heart"; 7. / "Lay Down Beside Me"; 8. / "From a Jack to a King"; 9. / "Where Do You Go To (My Lovely)?"; 10. / "Long Time Gone"; 11. / "Home to Aherlow"; 12. / "Go Rest High on That Mountain"; 13. / "One Night at a Time"; 14. / "Fishing in the Dark"; 15. / "The Town I Loved So Well"; 16. / "Party Mix"; 17. / "Irish Medley"; 18. / "One For the Road"
2013	The Wagon Wheel Live Show: Recorded at Aura Leisure Complex, Letterkenny, County Donegal	No. / Title / Length; 1. / "Welcome to the Weekend"; 2. / "Drift Away"; 3. / "King of the Road"; 4. / "Saw You Running"; 5. / "I Will Love You All My Life"; 6. / "South Australia"; 7. / "Caledonia"; 8. / "Tequila Makes Her Clothes Fall Off"; 9. / "The Leaving of Liverpool"; 10. / "The Broken Road"; 11. / "Ho Hey"; 12. / "Where I Wana Be"; 13. / "Hills of Donegal"; 14. / "Calling Baton Rouge"; 15. / "The Town I Loved So Well"; 16. / "Rock'n'Roll Medley"; 17. / "Pub crawl"; 18. / "Wagon Wheel"
2015	Live at the Marquee: Recorded at Live at the Marquee Festival, Cork City, Republic of Ireland	No. / Title / Length; 1. / "Wagon Wheel"; 2. / "Good Time Girls"; 3. / "Beautiful Life"; 4. / "How Sweet It Is"; 5. / "Boat to Liverpool"; 6. / "2 Reels"; 7. / "Good Morning Beautiful"; 8. / "Bowtie (Instrumental)"; 9. / "Call You Home"; 10. / "I Can't Stop Loving You"; 11. / "Temple Bar"; 12. / "South Australia"; 13. / "Home to Donegal"; 14. / "Thank You"; 15. / "Two Doors Down"; 16. / "Burning Love/Proud Mary"; 17. / "You'll Never Walk Alone"; 18. / "Loch Lomand"; 19. / "What About Christmas Song"
