= Country and Irish =

Subgenre of country music local to Ireland

- Other names: Culchie and Western
- Stylistic origins: Country, Irish traditional music, showband, folk
- Cultural origins: Ireland

Country and Irish, also known as Culchie and Western, is a musical subgenre in Ireland formed by mixing North American country-style music with Irish influences. It is especially popular in the rural Midlands and North-West of the country. However, it is less popular in urban areas or in the South-West where more traditional Irish music is favoured. It also remains popular among the Irish in Britain, particularly among the older generation. In a review of the album Round the House and Mind the Dresser: Irish Country House Dance Music, Vic Gammon observes that the music was partially inspired by a desire for cultural independence.

== History ==
Country and Irish music emerged from Ireland's showband scene, where local bands would play American pop standards tailored to Irish sensibilities. The showband scene was especially strong in Northern Ireland and border counties on account of restrictions on live music performances during Lent in the Republic of Ireland in the 1950s and 1960s. Johnny McCauley, who performed extensively for Irish expat audiences in London in the 1950s, is regarded as the first songwriter to compose songs in an American country music style with lyrics that specifically referenced Irish subject matter. His songs were covered by artists such as Big Tom and Larry Cunningham at a time when the showband business model was in decline, allowing these artists to pivot to selling recorded music.

== Artists ==
Artists who fit this genre include:

- Philomena Begley
- Big Tom
- Nathan Carter
- Crystal Swing
- Larry Cunningham
- T.R. Dallas
- Mike Denver
- Mary Duff
- Kathy Durkin
- Michael English
- John Farry
- Mick Flavin
- Foster and Allen
- Cliona Hagan
- John Hogan
- Richie Kavanagh
- James Kilbane
- Johnny Loughrey
- Margo
- Lee Matthews
- Susan McCann
- Johnny McCauley
- Johnny McEvoy
- Lisa McHugh
- John McNicholl
- Robert Mizzell
- P. J. Murrihy
- Declan Nerney
- Paddy O'Brien
- Daniel O'Donnell
- Derek Ryan

== Media ==
Country and Irish is featured on national and local media. Most local radio stations outside Dublin have a music show dedicated to country music, on programs such as Country Roads and Céilí Lár Tíre on Midlands 103 and on The Country Lounge on CRCfm. RTÉ Radio provide an hour of each Saturday with Country Time with Sandy Harsch.

In television, many of the country and Irish musicians had TV shows on RTÉ One during the 1980s such as The Sandy Kelly Show and The Red Hurley Show, but by the 1990s many of those shows had been axed by RTÉ. RTÉ also broadcast Country Music Television on RTÉ Two during the 1990s. In the 2000s, RTÉ produced a retrospective series, A Little Bit Country, featuring stars from the golden era of Irish country music.

The Irish Language Television service TG4 has provided a number of country and Irish programmes in its schedules such as Glór Tíre ("Country Voice").

Ireland West Music Television, a 24-hour country and Irish channel, was founded in the UK and Ireland in 2011.

== Album artwork ==
Country and Irish music is notable for its highly distinctive album artwork style. In most cases this involves the artist superimposed over a pastoral landscape.
