= Broken Marriage Vows =

Single by Big Tom and The Mainliners
- B-side: "Tears In My Eyes/Old Country Church"
- Released: 1972
- Recorded: 1972
- Studio: Eamonn Andrews Studio
- Genre: Country and Irish
- Length: 2:04
- Label: Denver
- Songwriters: John Bailes and Walter Bailes, arranged by Tom McBride and Johnny McCauley
- Producer: Bill O'Donovan

Big Tom and The Mainliners singles chronology
"I Love You Still" (1972)	"Broken Marriage Vows" (1972)	"Gentle Mother" (1974)

"Broken Marriage Vows" is a 1972 country and Irish song performed by Irish band Big Tom and The Mainliners.

== Song history ==
The song was written and performed by close-harmony group The Bailes Brothers (West Virginia) in 1947. It was also recorded by Kitty Wells in 1956.

It was released by Big Tom and The Mainliners in 1972 and reached number 1 in the Irish singles chart for two weeks in April 1972. It was arranged by Big Tom and Johnny McCauley. The song, in which the speaker chastises his wife for her unfaithfulness and refuses to take her back, had an added poignancy in 1970s Ireland where divorce was illegal.
