= Oram, County Monaghan =

Village in County Monaghan, Ireland

Oram Eoroim
- Village
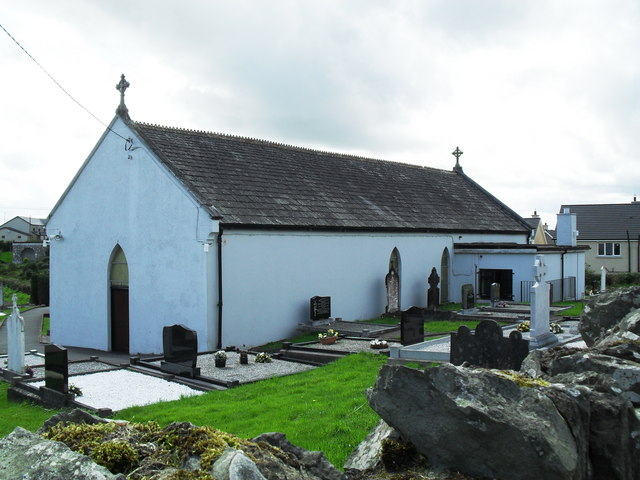
- St. Patrick's Church

- Location in Ireland
- Coordinates: 54°08′56″N 6°41′34″W
- Country: Ireland
- Province: Ulster
- County: County Monaghan
- Barony: Cremorne

Population (2016)
  - Total: 186

Oram (Irish: Eoroim, meaning 'yew ridge') is a village and townland in County Monaghan, Ireland. The village is on the R182 road, about 5 kilometres (3 mi) north-east of Castleblayney. The village population was 186 at the 2016 census.

The local Gaelic games club is Oram Sarsfields.

== Architecture ==
St Patrick’s Catholic Church was built around 1830 and remains in use. The T-shaped building has a slate roof, pointed-arch windows containing stained glass, and stone crosses at the tops of its gables. Inside are a timber-panelled roof, a gallery supported by cast-iron columns, and a marble altar. A graveyard surrounds the church. The National Inventory of Architectural Heritage considers the building important to Oram’s architectural and social heritage.

== Notable people ==
Big Tom McBride (1936–2018) was an Irish country-music singer from Oram. He formed the Mainliners during the mid-1960s and became the group’s frontman. His career gained wider attention following an appearance on RTÉ’s Showband Show. The band toured throughout Ireland and the United Kingdom during the 1970s.

McBride later began a solo career before reuniting with the Mainliners. During the 1980s, he recorded a popular series called King of Country Music. He received a lifetime-achievement award at the Irish Country Music Awards in 2016. McBride was also a former player and president of Oram Sarsfields.
