= I Love You Still =

Single by Big Tom and The Mainliners
- B-side: "Freight Train"
- Released: 1972
- Recorded: 1972
- Genre: Country and Irish
- Length: 2:04
- Label: Denver
- Songwriters: Joe Jones and Dolly Parton

Big Tom and The Mainliners singles chronology
"Back To Castleblayney" (1971)	"I Love You Still" (1972)	"Broken Marriage Vows" (1972)

"I Love You Still" is a 1973 country and Irish song performed by Irish band Big Tom and The Mainliners.

== Song history ==
It was released by Big Tom and The Mainliners in 1973 and reached number 1 in the Irish singles chart for two weeks in March 1973.
