= Live at the Marquee (Nathan Carter album) =

Live at the Marquee Cork

Live album by Nathan Carter
- Released: 16 November 2015
- Recorded: 21 June 2015
- Venue: Marquee Cork
- Genre: Country
- Label: Nathan Carter Music Group Limited

Nathan Carter chronology
Beautiful Life (2015)	Live at the Marquee Cork (2015)	Stayin' Up All Night (2016)

Nathan Carter - Live at the Marquee Cork, is Nathan Carter's 10th album and third live album. Unlike Nathan's two previous albums, Christmas Stuff and Beautiful Life, both of which were released by Decca Records, this album was released by Nathan himself via his company 'Nathan Carter Music Group Limited' and distributed by Sharpe Music. The album has peaked at number 9 in Ireland.

== Track listing ==
No.	Title	Length
1.	"Wagon Wheel"	4:50
2.	"Good Time Girls"	3:27
3.	"Beautiful Life"	5:24
4.	"How Sweet It Is"	5:01
5.	"Boat to Liverpool"	3:45
6.	"Polka Medley"	3:09
7.	"Good Morning Beautiful"	3:20
8.	"Call You Home"	3:49
9.	"I Can't Stop Loving You"	4:03
10.	"Temple Bar"	3:51
11.	"South Australia"	4:09
12.	"Home to Donegal"	5:46
13.	"Thank You"	3:35
14.	"Two Doors Down"	3:14
15.	"Burning Love/Proud Mary"	6:08
16.	"You'll Never Walk Alone"	3:25
17.	"Loch Lomand"	6:06
18.	"Irish Rover"	5:46

== Personnel ==
- Nathan Carter: Accordion, Composer, Guitar (Acoustic), Piano, Primary Artist, Vocals
- Derlene Cleary: Vocals (Background)
- Nigel Connell: Percussion, Vocals (Background)
- Stevie Hamilton: Banjo, Guitar, Lap Steel Guitar
- Roberta Howett: Vocals (Background)
- Gareth Lowry: Drums, Percussion
- Peter Maher: Keyboards, Mixing
- Daniel Martin: Guitar (Acoustic)
- Jim McVeigh: Keyboards, Piano
- John Pettifer: Guitar, Guitar (Acoustic), Vocals
- Seamus Rooney: Bass
- Tom Sheerin: Fiddle, Guitar (Acoustic), Mandolin

== Charts ==
Chart (2015)	Peak position
Irish Albums (IRMA)	9
