= The Way You Love Me =

The Way You Love Me may refer to:

- The Way You Love Me (Nathan Carter album), 2010
- "The Way You Love Me" (Faith Hill song), 2000
- "The Way You Love Me" (Karyn White song), 1988
- "The Way You Love Me" (Shanice song), 1988
- "The Way You Love Me" (Keri Hilson song), 2010
- "The Way You Love Me", a song by Jeremy Camp from Reckless, 2013
- "(I Like) The Way You Love Me", a song by Michael Jackson, 2010

== See also ==
- "I Love the Way You Love Me", a song by John Michael Montgomery, 1992
- "Like the Way You Love Me", a song by Sara Evans from the album Words, 2017
