= Beautiful Life (Nathan Carter album) =

Studio album by Nathan Carter
- Released: 4 May 2015
- Recorded: 2014
- Genre: Country
- Label: Decca Records

Nathan Carter chronology
Christmas Stuff (2014)	Beautiful Life (2015)	Live at the Marquee (2015)

Nathan Carter studio album chronology
Christmas Stuff (2014)	Beautiful Life (2015)	Stayin' Up All Night (2016)

Singles from Beautiful Life
- 1. "On the Boat to Liverpool" Released: 2014; 2. "Good Morning Beautiful" Released: 2015

Beautiful Life is the seventh studio album by English-Irish country singer Nathan Carter. It was released in Ireland on 4 May 2015 by Decca Records. The album peaked at number 1 on the Irish Albums Chart and number 34 on the UK Albums Chart. The album includes the singles "On the Boat to Liverpool" and "Good Morning Beautiful".

== Singles ==
"On the Boat to Liverpool" was released as the lead single from the album. The song peaked at number 95 on the Irish Singles Chart. "Good Morning Beautiful" was released as the second single from the album.

== Track listing ==
No.	Title	Length
1.	"Wagon Wheel"	3:33
2.	"Where I Wanna Be"	3:23
3.	"Caledonia"	4:34
4.	"Boat to Liverpool"	3:36
5.	"Beautiful Life"	3:30
6.	"Call You Home"	3:42
7.	"Saw You Running"	2:45
8.	"Lay Down Beside Me"	3:27
9.	"One for the Road"	3:03
10.	"On the Other Side"	3:45
11.	"Tequila Makes Her Clothes Fall Off"	3:08
12.	"Drift Away"	3:19
13.	"Welcome to the Weekend"	2:40
14.	"Good Morning Beautiful"	3:11

Beautiful Life – Deluxe Edition Bonus Tracks
No.	Title	Length
15.	"Where Do You Go to My Lovely"	3:54
16.	"Twelfth of Never"	4:00
17.	"Ho Hey"	2:40

Beautiful Life – Deluxe Edition DVD
No.	Title	Length
1.	"Wagon Wheel (Live in Ireland, 2015)"
2.	"The Town I Loved So Well (Live in Ireland, 2015)"
3.	"Caledonia (Live in Ireland, 2015)"
4.	"Where I Wanna Be (Live in Ireland, 2015)"
5.	"Wagon Wheel (EPK Footage)"
6.	"Learn the Wagon Wheel Dance"
7.	"Nathan On Tour"

== Charts ==
Chart (2015)	Peak position
Irish Albums (IRMA)	1
Scottish Albums (OCC)	11
UK Albums (OCC)	34

== Release history ==
Region	Date	Format	Label
Ireland	4 May 2015	Digital download	Decca Records

=== Certifications ===
Region	Certification	Certified units/sales
Ireland (IRMA)	4× Platinum	60,000^{^}
^{^} Shipments figures based on certification alone.
