= The Wagon Wheel Show – Live =

Live album by Nathan Carter
- Released: 3 March 2014
- Recorded: 2013
- Genre: Country
- Label: Sharpe Music

Nathan Carter chronology
Where I Wanna Be (2013)	The Wagon Wheel Show – Live (2014)	Christmas Stuff (2014)

The Wagon Wheel Show – Live is the second live album by English-Irish country singer Nathan Carter. It was released in Ireland on 3 March 2014. The peaked at number 1 on the Irish Albums Chart.

== Track listing ==
No.	Title	Length
1.	"Welcome to the Weekend"	4:35
2.	"Drift Away"	3:22
3.	"King of the Road"	1:56
4.	"Saw You Running"	3:09
5.	"I Will Love You All My Life"	3:53
6.	"South Australia"	4:10
7.	"Caledonia"	3:33
8.	"Tequila Makes Her Clothes Fall Off"	2:53
9.	"The Leaving of Liverpool"	4:10
10.	"Bless the Broken Road"	3:58
11.	"Ho Hey"	2:59
12.	"Where I Wanna Be"	3:26
13.	"Hills of Donegal"	4:08
14.	"Baton Rouge"	2:44
15.	"The Town I Loved So Well"	6:55
16.	"Old Time Rock 'n' Roll Medley"	8:14
17.	"Pub Crawl Medley"	5:14
18.	"Wagon Wheel"	5:15

== Charts ==
Chart (2014)	Peak position
Irish Albums (IRMA)	1

== Release history ==
Region	Date	Format	Label
Ireland	3 March 2014	Digital download	Sharpe Music
