= Born for the Road =

Studio album by Nathan Carter
- Released: 12 October 2018
- Recorded: 2017
- Genre: Country
- Label: Sharpe Music

Nathan Carter chronology
Live at 3Arena (2017)	Born for the Road (2018)	Irish Heartland (2019)

Nathan Carter studio album chronology
Livin' the Dream (2017)	Born for the Road (2018)	Irish Heartland (2019)

Singles from Born for the Road
- 1. "Give It to Me" Released: 3 May 2018; 2. "Winnie O'Neill" Released: 23 July 2018

Born for the Road is the tenth studio album by English-Irish country singer Nathan Carter. It was released in Ireland on 12 October 2018 by Sharpe Music. The album peaked at number 3 on the Irish Albums Chart. The album includes the singles "Give It to Me" and "Winnie O'Neill".

== Singles ==
"Give It to Me" was released as the lead single from the album on 3 May 2018. "Winnie O'Neill" was released as the second single from the album on 23 July 2018.

== Track listing ==
No.	Title	Length
1.	"Winnie O'Neill"	3:45
2.	"She Don't Know She's Beautiful"	2:55
3.	"Love Is a Beautiful Dance"	3:28
4.	"If You Wanna Find Gold"	2:46
5.	"Right All Right"	3:19
6.	"There You Are"	3:04
7.	"Misty"	3:47
8.	"Unbelievable"	2:25
9.	"The World Looks Better with You"	3:20
10.	"Jug of Sangria"	3:48
11.	"Give It to Me"	3:16
12.	"Little Rock"	4:06
13.	"Garden Party"	3:45
14.	"Why Walk When You Can Fly"	3:06
15.	"Last the Rest of Your Life"	3:36
16.	"Dan O'Hara"	3:45

== Charts ==
Chart (2018)	Peak position
Irish Albums (IRMA)	3

== Release history ==
Region	Date	Format	Label
Ireland	12 October 2018	Digital download; streaming	Sharpe Music
