= Live at 3Arena =

Live album by Nathan Carter
- Released: 17 November 2017
- Recorded: 2017
- Venue: 3Arena, Dublin
- Genre: Country
- Label: Sharpe Music

Nathan Carter chronology
Celtic Roots (2017)	Live at 3Arena (2017)	Born for the Road (2018)

Live at 3Arena is the sixth live album by English-Irish country singer Nathan Carter. It was released in Ireland on 17 November 2017 by Sharpe Music. The peaked at number 26 on the Irish Albums Chart.

== Background ==
The album was recorded at the 3Arena in Dublin, Ireland on 1 April 2017. A DVD was released on 20 October 2017 and includes 20 live tracks, Bonus songs and exclusive behind the scenes film of the gig, with the album released on 17 November 2017.

== Track listing ==
No.	Title	Length
1.	"Intro"	1:02
2.	"Two Doors Down"	3:09
3.	"Living the Dream"	3:58
4.	"Good Time Girls"	3:30
5.	"Wanna Dance"	4:13
6.	"Fishing In the Dark"	3:01
7.	"Liverpool"	5:03
8.	"Temple Bar"	3:36
9.	"Rare Auld Times"	4:33
10.	"Glen Campbell Medley"	3:56
11.	"Skinny Dipping"	2:59
12.	"Let the Good Times Roll"	4:31
13.	"Jealous of the Angels"	5:26
14.	"Kenny Rogers Medley"	5:53
15.	"The Irish Rover"	4:51
16.	"Bridge Over Troubled Water"	4:38
17.	"Wagon Wheel"	5:14
18.	"Shut Up and Dance"	5:14

== Charts ==
Chart (2017)	Peak position
Irish Albums (IRMA)	26

Chart (2020)	Peak position
Scottish Albums (OCC)	67

== Release history ==
Region	Date	Format	Label
Ireland	17 November 2017	Digital download	Sharpe Music
