= John McNicholl =

- Born: Foreglen, Derry, Northern Ireland
- Genres: Country
- Occupation: Singer
- Instruments: Vocals
- Years active: 2004–present
- Labels: Arran Records
- Website: http://johnmcnicholl.com

John McNicholl is a country singer from Northern Ireland.

McNicholl's first album, Something Old, Something New was released in 2004 and earned him the "Best Newcomer" award at the Irish World Awards. He also represented Ireland at the CMA Global Showcase in Nashville. Since then, he has gone on to record a number of albums each earning him a following in both Ireland and the United Kingdom.

== Early life ==
He was born in Foreglen, a small village in Derry.

== Discography ==
- Something Old, Something New
- What's A Guy Gotta Do
- The Irish Collection
- You Are No Angel
- Someone Like You
- It's Your Love
