= Radio (Darius Rucker song) =

Single by Darius Rucker

from the album True Believers
- Released: July 22, 2013
- Genre: Country
- Length: 3:08
- Label: Capitol Nashville
- Songwriters: Darius Rucker; Luke Laird; Ashley Gorley
- Producer: Frank Rogers

Darius Rucker singles chronology
"Wagon Wheel" (2013)	"Radio" (2013)	"Miss You" (2014)

"Radio" is a song co-written and recorded by American country music artist Darius Rucker. It was released on July 22, 2013 as the third single from his album True Believers. Rucker wrote the song with Luke Laird and Ashley Gorley.

== Content ==
The song is a reflection on the narrator's teenage years; specifically, of borrowing his mother's car to take his girlfriend for a ride, and listening to songs on the radio while doing so.

== Critical reception ==
The song generally received favorable reviews. Bobby Peacock of Roughstock gave the song four and a half stars out of five, saying that "it sounds like the kind of fun song you would want to hear on the radio at a memorable moment." Peacock praised Rucker's "all-smiles delivery" and the song's "incredibly catchy melody and tight production." He also compared its theme to "I Watched It All (On My Radio)" by Lionel Cartwright. Tammy Ragusa of Country Weekly gave the song an A grade, calling it "the perfect marriage of an artist’s effervescent personality with an upbeat song, this one about the love of music." Billy Dukes of Taste of Country gave the song two and a half stars out of five, writing that "the uptempo tribute to young love, open roads and, of course, the radio is familiar and easy to fall for, especially when powered by Rucker’s unequaled exuberance." However, Dukes also called the song "a little fluffy" and "not difficult to forget."

== Chart performance ==
"Radio" debuted at number 54 on the U.S. Billboard Country Airplay chart for the week of August 3, 2013. It also debuted at number 50 on the U.S. Billboard Hot Country Songs chart for the week of September 14, 2013. It also debuted at number 96 on the U.S. Billboard Hot 100 chart for the week of November 2, 2013. It also debuted at number 95 on the Canadian Hot 100 chart for the week of December 14, 2013.

== Charts ==
=== Weekly charts ===
Chart (2013–2014)	Peak position
Canada Hot 100 (Billboard)	82
Canada Country (Billboard)	6
US Billboard Hot 100	65
US Hot Country Songs (Billboard)	14
US Country Airplay (Billboard)	4

=== Year-end charts ===
Chart (2013)	Position
US Hot Country Songs (Billboard)	94
US Country Airplay (Billboard)	66

Chart (2014)	Position
US Hot Country Songs (Billboard)	74
US Country Airplay (Billboard)	61

== Certifications ==
Region	Certification	Certified units/sales
United States (RIAA)	Gold	500,000^{‡}
^{‡} Sales+streaming figures based on certification alone.
