= Michael English (Irish singer) =

Irish country singer

- Born: 23 April 1979 (age 45); Castledermot, County Kildare, Ireland
- Genres: Country
- Occupation: Singer
- Instrument(s): Voice, piano, button accordion
- Years active: 1999–present
- Labels: Ritz Records, Dolphin Records
- Website: michaelenglish.ie

Michael English (born 23 April 1979) is an Irish country singer. He was born in a musical family as his father played button accordion with a traditional Irish band, his mother was an Irish dancer, and his two sisters played fiddle and piano.

At the age of nine, English started studying the piano formally at the Hennessy School of Music in Carlow. In 1990, he appeared on Gay Byrne's The Late Late Show television programme at age 11. He continued his musical studies the Royal Irish Academy of Music in Dublin and launched an Irish country music career. Henry McMahon of The Mainliners offered him one of his own compositions, "The Nearest to Perfect" that became a hit for English in 1999. Signing a contract with Ritz Records, English won Best International Entertainer at the Irish National Entertainers Awards ceremony in both 2004 and 2005. He went on to record a number of albums, and a number of single hits with Dolphin Records / Roscas Recordings.

== Workplace commission ==
In August 2024, a former fiddler was given €43,000 for unfair dismissal and breaches of employment rights. Relating to the issue, English reportedly said "I've too many things going on and I'm going to continue hiring musicians the same way I've always done for the last 22 years".

== Discography ==
=== Albums ===
Studio

- 2006: Best of Friends
- 2009: All My Life
- 2010: Portrait of My Love
- 2012: This Is Michael English
- 2015: Dance All Night

=== Singles ===
- 1999: "The Nearest to Perfect"
- 2016: "Tuam Beat"
- 2016: "Crazy Over You" (duet with Cliona Hagan)
