= John Hogan (singer) =

- Born: John Hogan; 31 August 1953 (age 72); Dublin, Ireland
- Origin: Kilbeggan, County Westmeath
- Genres: Country
- Occupation: Singer/songwriter
- Instruments: Vocals, guitar
- Years active: 1987–present
- Labels: K-tel, Rosette Records, Ritz Records, Harmac Records
- Website: www.johnhoganmusic.co.uk

Johnny Hogan (born 31 August 1953), is an Irish country music singer-songwriter and guitar player. He released 16 CDs and a live concert DVD. He is sometimes referred to as the 'Prince of Irish country music' as well as the 'Offaly Rover'.

== Early life ==
Hogan was born and raised in the town of Kilbeggan in County Westmeath, in the midlands of Ireland.

== Career ==
Hogan began his career in 1987 when he recorded 'Brown Eyes', which found its way into the hands of radio presenter Don Allen. He was the first to play the song, helping it eventually reach No. 1 in the Irish Country Music charts where it remained for several weeks. Hundreds of people phoned the station looking to know more about this new singer.

In addition to his interpretations of country standards, Hogan's original songs include ‘My Feelings For You’ and ‘Turn Back The Years,’ which were included on his first recordings for K-tel Records. In 1993, 'Stepping Stone' became a major hit for Hogan in St. Lucia, where he retains a large following.

Hogan is a fan of John Denver and Hank Locklin and has recorded many of their songs.

At the time he recorded 'Brown Eyes', a song his mother used to sing to him, John was a supervisor with Bord Na Mona.

His first professional performance came at the Border Inn, Castleford, in County Donegal, to a sell-out crowd and became one of the biggest names in Irish country music virtually overnight.

During the 1990s, Hogan filmed a concert video, 'My Kind Of Country,' which was released on VHS and on DVD by Rosette Records. Hogan recorded studio albums in Nashville, Tennessee and is a labelmate on London-based Ritz Records with American country music singer Charley Pride. During this period, Hogan continued to build a following in the United States and was asked to perform at Pride's theatre venue in Branson, Missouri.

Hogan hosts a weekly program called It's Country with John Hogan on Sky 389 on the Keep It Country TV channel, which focuses on interviews, news stories and music videos pertaining to country music.

Hogan has shared the stage with country music acts including Nitty Gritty Dirt Band, Daniel O'Donnell, Billie Jo Spears, Mick Flavin, Merle Haggard, Philomena Begley, Roy Drusky, Paddy O'Brien, Ray Price, Mary Duff, Claude Gray, and Gene Watson, whose hit version of 'Paper Rosie' inspired Hogan to cover the song.

Hogan tours in Ireland, the United Kingdom, Canada and the United States as well as Spain, Portugal and St. Lucia, where he was given the title 'Freeman of St. Lucia'.

== Personal life ==
Today, he is more often associated with County Offaly and has resided in the town of Croghan for over 30 years. He is married to his childhood sweetheart Esther and they have five children Caroline, Lorna, Robert, Dermot and Mark. His interests are walking, gardening and cutting turf. Hogan can be heard on occasion on radio station Midlands 103fm.'.
