= Kathy Durkin =

Irish singer

Kathy Durkin (born 1 April 1955) is an Irish singer in the Country and Irish genre. A native of Butlersbridge, Co. Cavan, she is best known for her hit "The Clock in the Tower" and "Working Man" which stayed 26 weeks in the charts. She is one of five daughters and three sons of the well-known fiddler Eugene Leddy, who toured Ireland with his Ceili band in the 1940s and 1950s. She currently lives in Cavan with Andy, her husband of 38 years and their family. Her son, Aindreas, is also a singer. Her sisters Anne and Phyll are also talented singers.

Durkin is well known for her fundraising and charity work and in particular for her major fundraising efforts for Our Lady's Hospital, Crumlin. Kathy won an All-Ireland Senior Ladies' Football Championship medal with Cavan GAA in 1977.
