= James Kilbane =

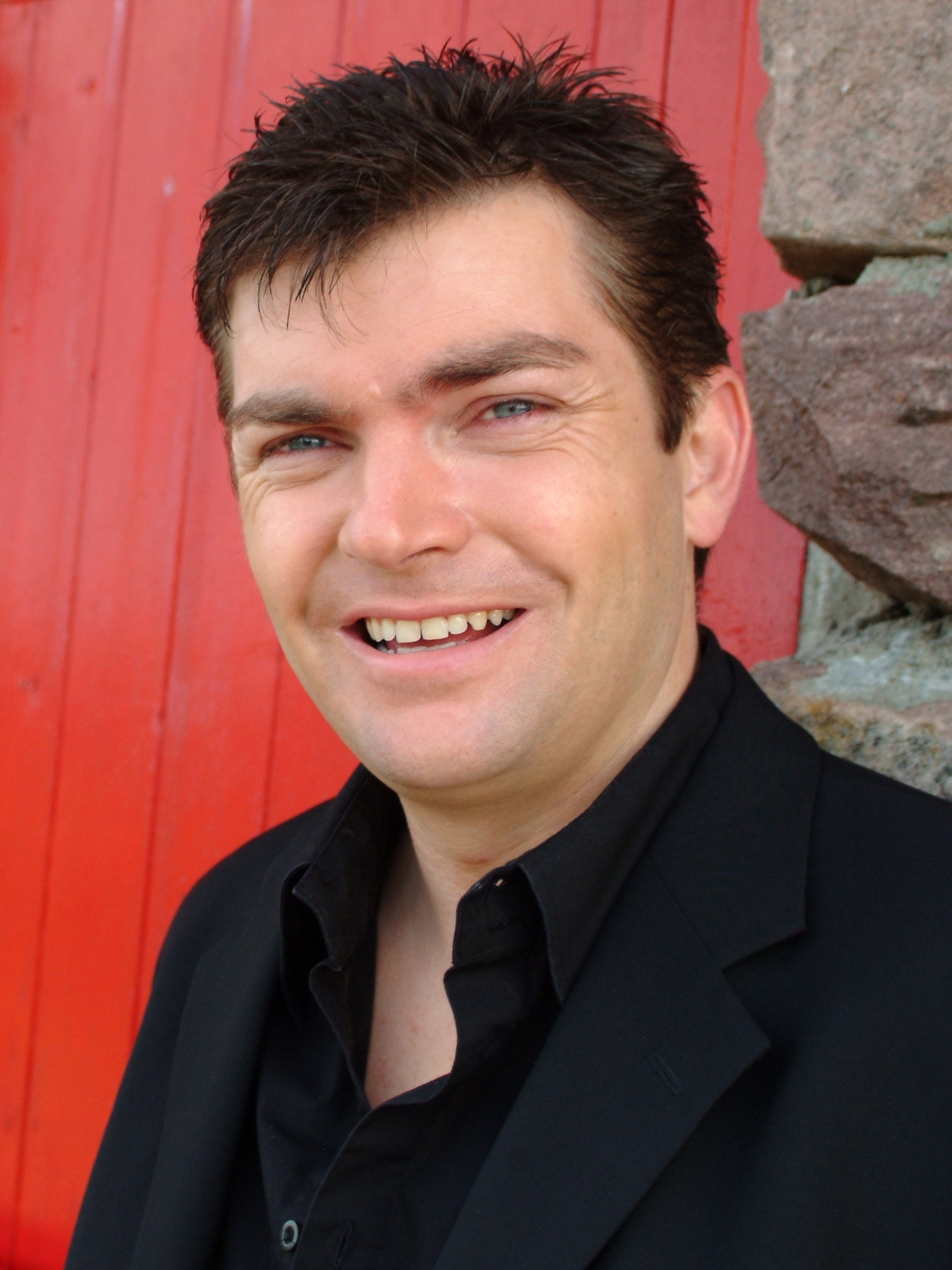

Background information
- Born: James Patrick Kilbane; 14 October 1970 (age 55); London, England
- Origin: Ireland
- Genres: Christian Country, Gospel, Country & Irish
- Occupations: Singer, songwriter, music producer, holiday leader, television presenter.
- Instruments: Vocals, rhythm guitar
- Years active: 1986 - present
- Labels: Gold Eagle Music, Veritas Publications, Dolphin Music Group, Sony Music, RTÉ
- Spouse: Christina Kilbane (m. 1989)
- Website: jameskilbane.net

James Kilbane (born 14 October 1970) is an Irish Christian country, gospel, and country and Irish singer.

== Early life ==
Kilbane was born in Central Middlesex Hospital, Park Royal, London, England and spent part of his childhood in Harlesden, North West London. His family moved to Achill, Ireland where he was educated.

== Career ==
Kilbane appeared on Irish television in 2004 as part of RTÉ One's You're A Star, a competition to select Ireland’s entry for the 2004 Eurovision Song Contest. Kilbane ultimately lost out to Chris Doran in the final.

Since 2004, Kilbane has released a number of albums on the Gold Eagle Music label including King of the Road, Close to You, Hymns of Praise, Divine Love, Life's Miracle, Heart to Heart, Glory and Grace, Mary: The Lord's Servant, The Songs of Faith Collection, The Family Collection, Gravel & Grace and Songs of Ireland, as well as a Christmas album titled The Christmas Collection. Kilbane's albums often feature Nashville and Irish collaborations.

In June 2012, Kilbane and his band performed at the 50th International Eucharistic Congress at the RDS Arena in Dublin. He continues to perform at other religious events in Ireland, including at Knock.

Since 2016, he has hosted Keltic Country Gospel with James Kilbane on the UK digital TV channel Keep It Country.

In 2018, Kilbane criticized the selection of Daniel O'Donnell to perform for Pope Francis during his visit to Ireland that year on account of O'Donnell's support for a "yes" vote in Ireland's same-sex marriage referendum in 2015.

In 2019, he was voted as Irish Gospel Singer Of The Year as part of the Irish Entertainment Awards.

== Personal life ==
Kilbane married Christina in 1989 and they have two children.

He is a practising Catholic.

He lives on a farm in Achill Island in Ireland.

He is related to Irish international footballer Kevin Kilbane, to the Stoke City F.C. and Scotland football player Darren Fletcher, and to 1912-1923 World Featherweight Champion Johnny Kilbane.
