= Irish Heartland =

Studio album by Nathan Carter
- Released: 8 November 2019
- Recorded: 2018
- Genre: Country
- Label: Sharpe Music

Nathan Carter chronology
Born for the Road (2018)	Irish Heartland (2019)	The Best of the First 10 Years – Anniversary Collection (2020)

Nathan Carter studio album chronology
Born for the Road (2018)	Irish Heartland (2019)

Irish Heartland is the eleventh studio album by English-Irish country singer Nathan Carter. It was released in Ireland on 8 November 2019 by Sharpe Music. The album peaked at number fourteen on the Irish Albums Chart.

== Background ==
According to Sharpe Music, Nathan Carter "takes listeners on a musical journey through his beloved Irish Heartland". The album features collaborations with artists including The High Kings, Finbar Furey and Cherrish the Ladies, and an orchestral accompaniment from the Bulgarian Symphony Orchestra. Speaking ahead of the album release, Carter said, "Over the years, I have adored performing folk music everywhere from Fleadh Ceoils to theatres and arenas across the world. Wherever I play, these songs are now some of the most popular on my set list and I play them with immense pride."

== Track listing ==
No.	Title	Length
1.	"Ireland"	3:56
2.	"Mountains of Mourne (trad. arr. John Byrne)"	4:43
3.	"Donnybrook Fair" (feat. Finbar Furey)	3:07
4.	"Nancy Spain"	3:12
5.	"Rare Auld Times"	4:39
6.	"Trouble In the Fields"	3:23
7.	"Temple Bar"	2:57
8.	"The Banks of the Roses"	2:51
9.	"Grace"	4:46
10.	"Beeswing"	3:49
11.	"Belfast"	4:14
12.	"Winnie O'Neill"	3:39
13.	"Dan O'Hara"	3:43
14.	"My Own Island Town"	4:44
15.	"On the Boat To Liverpool"	3:36
16.	"Ned of the Hill"	5:14
17.	"Heart of the Home" (feat. Cherish the Ladies)	3:42
18.	"May the Road Rise" (feat. The High Kings)	3:47

== Charts ==
Chart (2019)	Peak position
Irish Albums (IRMA)	14

== Release history ==
Region	Date	Format	Label
Ireland	8 November 2019	Digital download; streaming	Sharpe Music
