= The Best of the First 10 Years – Anniversary Collection =

Compilation album by Nathan Carter
- Released: 12 November 2020
- Label: Sharpe Music

Nathan Carter chronology
Irish Heartland (2019)	The Best of the First 10 Years – Anniversary Collection (2020)	Little Old Town (2021)

Singles from The Best of the First 10 Years – Anniversary Collection
- 1. "Sarah Jane" Released: 21 August 2020

The Best of the First 10 Years – Anniversary Collection is the first compilation album by English-Irish country singer Nathan Carter. It was released in Ireland on 12 November 2020 by Sharpe Music and peaked at number 24 on the Irish Albums Chart.

== Background ==
In October 2020, Carter announced the album on his Twitter account, saying "I'm delighted to be able to release my new album which will be released on 12th November. This year I’m celebrating a decade on the road and this new release is a celebration of some of my best bits so far. On it, you'll find some new originals & some of my favourite recordings!"

== Singles ==
"Sarah Jane" was released as the lead single from the album on 21 August 2020.

== Track listing ==
No.	Title	Length
1.	"Sarah Jane"	3:23
2.	"Temple Bar"	3:01
3.	"Beeswing"	3:51
4.	"The Games People Play"	2:45
5.	"Wings to Fly"	3:26
6.	"Gypsy Queen"	4:15
7.	"Banks of the Roses"	2:55
8.	"Break for the Border"	3:44
9.	"Where I Wanna Be"	3:22
10.	"Boat to Liverpool"	3:38
11.	"Caledonia"	4:38
12.	"Good Time Girls"	3:36
13.	"Welcome to the Weekend"	2:44
14.	"May the Road Rise" (feat. The High Kings)	3:49
15.	"Time of Your Life"	3:13
16.	"You Can't Make Old Friends" (feat. Lisa McHugh)	3:59
17.	"Winnie O'Neill"	3:47
18.	"Good Morning Beautiful"	3:13
19.	"Wagon Wheel"	4:54
20.	"One for the Road"	3:12

== Charts ==
Chart performance for The Best of the First 10 Years – Anniversary Collection
Chart (2020)	Peak position
Irish Albums (OCC)	21
Scottish Albums (OCC)	21

== Release history ==
Region	Date	Format	Label
Ireland	12 November 2020	Digital download	Sharpe Music
