= True Believers (Darius Rucker album) =

Studio album by Darius Rucker
- Released: May 21, 2013
- Genre: Country
- Length: 46:12
- Label: Capitol Nashville
- Producer: Frank Rogers

Darius Rucker chronology
Charleston, SC 1966 (2010)	True Believers (2013)	Home for the Holidays (2014)

Singles from True Believers
- 1. "True Believers" Released: August 27, 2012; 2. "Wagon Wheel" Released: January 7, 2013; 3. "Radio" Released: July 22, 2013; 4. "Miss You" Released: February 3, 2014

True Believers is the fourth studio album by American country music artist Darius Rucker, and his third in the country genre. It was released on May 21, 2013, through Capitol Records Nashville.

== Critical reception ==
Professional ratings
Review scores
Source	Rating
Allmusic	3.5/5 stars
Country Weekly	B
Music Is My Oxygen	4.5/5 stars
The Oakland Press	3/4 stars
Rolling Stone	3/5 stars
Roughstock	4/5 stars
Taste of Country	3/5 stars
USA Today	3/4 stars

True Believers has received positive reception from the music critics. Fred Thomas of Allmusic told that "the thing is, with a few songs you have to be listening pretty closely to differentiate the country affectations from the pop songwriting Rucker's been doing all along." Music Is My Oxygen's Rob Burkhardt called the work "a set of highly sing-able, highly memorable tunes, loaded with ear-worm hooks and virtually no mis-steps." At The Oakland Press, Gary Graff found that on this release that Rucker has made "something deeper than the annual ledger-satisfying exercises at which most country acts excel", which he "gets into some genuinely deep subject matter here". Roughstock's Matt Bjorke affirmed that the album "feels solid and ready for the spotlight or setlist." At USA Today, Brian Mansfield wrote that "Rucker sings plenty about driving, spring break and the radio". Billy Dukes of Taste of Country wrote that the release "suffers from a sonic sameness that stays within Rucker’s comfort zone", and noted that "there's a whiff of formula [...] something every artist should work to stay ahead of."

== Commercial performance ==
True Believers debuted at No. 1 on the Top Country Albums chart and No. 2 on the Billboard 200, with 83,000 sold for the week. This was Rucker's third top-placing studio album in a row. The album was certified Gold by the RIAA on February 12, 2014. As of April 2015, the album has sold 575,400 copies in the United States

== Track listing ==
No.	Title	Writer(s)	Length
1.	"True Believers"	Darius Rucker, Josh Kear	4:03
2.	"Miss You"	Rucker, Frank Rogers	4:00
3.	"Wagon Wheel" (featuring Lady Antebellum on backing vocals)	Bob Dylan, Ketch Secor	4:57
4.	"Love Without You" (featuring Sheryl Crow)	Brandy Clark, Shane McAnally	3:19
5.	"Radio"	Rucker, Luke Laird, Ashley Gorley	3:08
6.	"Lost in You"	Rucker, Mark Nesler, Phillip White	3:27
7.	"I Will Love You Still" (featuring Mallary Hope)	Rucker, Kear	3:48
8.	"Take Me Home"	Rucker, Rogers, Monty Criswell	4:08
9.	"Shine"	Rucker, Rogers	4:10
10.	"Heartbreak Road"	Rucker, Dallas Davidson, Rhett Akins	3:13
11.	"Leavin' the Light On"	Rucker, David Lee Murphy, Phil O'Donnell	3:55
12.	"Lie to Me"	Rucker, Rodney Clawson, Bob DiPiero	4:04
Total length:			46:12

Deluxe Edition
No.	Title	Writer(s)	Length
13.	"Your Cheatin' Heart"	Hank Williams	2:40
14.	"One Tequila"	Rucker, Rogers, Criswell	4:00
15.	"Only Wanna Be with You" (live from the House of Blues)	Rucker, Dean Felber, Jim Sonefeld, Mark Bryan	5:05

== Personnel ==
- David Angell – strings
- Tom Bukovac – acoustic guitar, electric guitar
- John Catchings – strings
- J.T. Corenflos – electric guitar
- Sheryl Crow – vocals on "Love Without You"
- Eric Darken – percussion
- David Davidson – strings
- Aubrey Haynie – fiddle, mandolin
- Dave Haywood – acoustic guitar and background vocals on "Wagon Wheel"
- Wes Hightower – background vocals
- Mallary Hope – vocals on "I Will Love You Still"
- Mike Johnson – dobro, pedal steel guitar
- Charles Kelley – background vocals on "Wagon Wheel"
- Gayle Mayes – background vocals
- Greg Morrow – drums
- Gordon Mote – Hammond B-3 organ, piano, Wurlitzer
- Russ Pahl – pedal steel guitar
- Angela Primm – background vocals
- Michael Rhodes – bass guitar
- Frank Rogers – keyboards
- Darius Rucker – lead vocals
- Hillary Scott – background vocals on "Wagon Wheel"
- Russell Terrell – background vocals
- Ilya Toshinsky – acoustic guitar, mandolin
- Kris Wilkinson – strings

== Charts ==
=== Weekly charts ===
Chart (2013)	Peak position
Canadian Albums (Billboard)	17
US Billboard 200	2
US Top Country Albums (Billboard)	1

=== Year-end charts ===
Chart (2013)	Position
US Billboard 200	61
US Top Country Albums (Billboard)	15

Chart (2014)	Position
US Billboard 200	195
US Top Country Albums (Billboard)	29

=== Singles ===
Year	Single	Peak chart positions				
Year	Single	US Country	US Country Airplay	US	CAN Country	CAN
2012	"True Believers"	24	17	108	—	—
2013	"Wagon Wheel"	1	1	15	1	23
2013	"Radio"	14	4	65	6	82
2014	"Miss You"	—	48	—	—	—
"—" denotes releases that did not chart

== Certifications ==
Region	Certification	Certified units/sales
United States (RIAA)	2× Platinum	2,000,000^{‡}
^{‡} Sales+streaming figures based on certification alone.
