= Lisa McHugh =

British singer

- Born: 16 August 1988 (age 38); Glasgow, Scotland
- Occupation: Country music singer
- Spouse: Nathan Khan (m. 2022; sep. 2026)
- Children: 2
- Website: https://lisamchughmusic.com/

Lisa McHugh (born 16 August 1988) is a Scottish-Irish country and pop singer. She launched her music career in Northern Ireland in 2010, has won "Female Vocalist of the Year" five times, and received international recognition after performing at the Grand Ole Opry in 2012. She also hosted the TV series On the Road with Lisa.

== Early life ==
Lisa McHugh was born on 16 August 1988 in Glasgow, Scotland, to Irish parents. Her father hails from Castlederg in County Tyrone, and her mother is from Falcarragh, a townland in the Cloughaneely district of County Donegal. Raised in a household steeped in Irish culture and music, McHugh was influenced early on by country artists. In June 2010, she relocated to Enniskillen, Co Fermanagh, to pursue a professional music career, assembling a band and beginning to tour shortly afterwards.

== Personal life ==
McHugh briefly dated fellow country singer Nathan Carter in 2015, and they separated amicably after six months. Despite the split, they remain close friends and musical collaborators. Carter later attended McHugh's wedding to Nathan Khan in 2022, describing it as "the best wedding I’ve ever been at." Following the birth of McHugh's son, she shared birthday photos of Carter holding the newborn and affectionately referred to him as "Uncle Nathan."

McHugh met Khan during a night out in Enniskillen. Although originally from the area, Khan was visiting at the time, and their meeting was described by McHugh as "completely coincidental." She announced their engagement in August 2020 without naming her fiancé, though his identity was publicly revealed days later. McHugh and Khan's first child child, a son, was born in January 2022 and the couple married in County Donegal that June. In February 2024, she announced they were expecting their second child, a daughter, who was born in July of that year. In the months following the birth, the baby experienced a series of health scares, including breathing difficulties, two hospitalisations for RSV, and issues such as allergies and iron deficiency. These were later identified and treated, and by mid‑2025 McHugh shared that her child had made a significant recovery. In August 2026, McHugh announced that she and Khan had separated several months earlier.

=== Health ===
In July 2025, McHugh revealed she had been diagnosed with Functional Neurological Disorder (FND), which affects how the brain and nervous system communicate. She also disclosed a prior diagnosis of trigeminal neuralgia, a disorder causing severe facial pain. After a hospital stay and extensive testing, she temporarily lost function in both legs and used a Zimmer frame to walk. She attributed the onset of FND to stress and trauma involving her daughter's health scares, and announced a break from public engagements to focus on recovery.

== Discography ==
=== Studio albums ===
Title	Details	Peak chart positions
Title	Details	IRE
Old Fashioned Girl	Released: 11 October 2010; Label: Self-released; Formats: Digital download, CD	—
Dreams Come to Life	Released: 3 July 2012; Label: Rosette Records; Formats: CD	—
A Life That's Good	Released: 24 October 2014; Label: Sharpe Music; Formats: Digital download, CD	94
Wildfire	Released: 18 September 2015; Label: Sharpe Music; Formats: Digital download, CD	7
#Country	Released: 12 August 2016; Label: Sharpe Music; Formats: Digital download, CD	3
Who I Am	Released: 6 October 2017; Label: Sharpe Music; Formats: Digital download, CD	1
Watch Me	Released: 20 October 2023; Label: Sharpe Music; Formats: Digital download	24

=== Live albums ===
Title	Details
#LisaLive	Released: 10 February 2017; Label: Sharpe Music; Formats: Digital download, CD

=== Non-album singles and guest appearances ===
- "I Told You So" (2010)
  (duet with Robert Mizzell, on his album Redneck Man)
- "A Mother's Rosary" (2011)
- "I'll Be Home With Bells On" (2011) (duet with Daniel O'Donnell)
- "Let's Pretend We Never Met" (2013)
- "Y'all Come" (2018)
- "Honey, Honey" (2018) (duet with Derek Ryan)
- "Home with a Heartbeat" (2019)
- "You're Gonna Get Back Up" (2020)
- "Tennessee" (2025)
