= Where I Wanna Be (Nathan Carter album) =

Studio album by Nathan Carter
- Released: 26 August 2013
- Recorded: 2012
- Genre: Country
- Label: Decca Records; Sharpe Music

Nathan Carter chronology
Wagon Wheel (2012)	Where I Wanna Be (2013)	The Wagon Wheel Show – Live (2014)

Nathan Carter studio album chronology
Wagon Wheel (2012)	Where I Wanna Be (2013)	Christmas Stuff (2014)

Singles from Where I Wanna Be
- 1. "Where I Wanna Be" Released: 2013; 2. "Boys of Summer" Released: 2013

Where I Wanna Be is the fifth studio album by English-Irish country singer Nathan Carter. It was released in Ireland on 26 August 2013 by Decca Records and Sharpe Music. The album peaked at number 1 on the Irish Albums Chart. The album includes the singles "Where I Wanna Be" and "Boys of Summer".

== Singles ==
"Where I Wanna Be" was released as the lead single from the album. "Boys of Summer" was released as the second single from the album. The song peaked at number 96 on the Irish Singles Chart.

== Track listing ==
No.	Title	Length
1.	"Welcome to the Weekend"	2:45
2.	"Ho Hey"	2:42
3.	"Precious Time"	3:22
4.	"South Australia"	3:04
5.	"Eighteen Wheels & a Dozen Roses"	3:17
6.	"Where Did I Go Wrong?"	3:03
7.	"Twelfth of Never"	4:03
8.	"Where I Wanna Be"	3:24
9.	"The Road Back"	2:57
10.	"Boys of Summer"	3:12
11.	"On the Other Side"	3:50
12.	"Let Me Be There"	3:09
13.	"Saw You Running"	2:48
14.	"Brightest Lights"	2:51

== Charts ==
Chart (2013)	Peak position
Irish Albums (IRMA)	1

== Release history ==
Region	Date	Format	Label
Ireland	26 August 2013	Digital download	Decca Records; Sharpe Music
