= Big Tom and The Mainliners =

Irish showband

- Origin: Castleblayney, County Monaghan, Ireland
- Genres: Country; country and Irish
- Years active: 1966–1975; 1989–2018
- Past members: Tom McBride; Seamus McMahon; Henry McMahon; John Beattie; Ginger Morgan; Ronie Duffy; Cyril McKevitt; Robert Browne; Dermot McBride; Peter McCarthy

Big Tom and The Mainliners were a country and Irish showband from the Castleblayney area of County Monaghan, Ireland.

== Timeline ==
=== 1966–1975 ===
Originally named the "Mainliners Showband", sometimes prefixed with the word "Mighty", and already beginning to make a name on the country music scene in Ireland and Scotland, particularly since mid-1965 when the late John McCormack of Rockcorry became their manager, the band received its biggest break and widespread fame appearing on RTÉ Television's Showband Show broadcast on Saturday, 21 May 1966.

In Big Tom McBride's own words, published in the Connaught Telegraph on 27 June, 1984, their appearance on The Showband Show was "made possible by the herculean efforts of Tommy Toal" aka Fat Sam; late radio presenter, singer, entertainer, and a pioneer of local and community radio in his native town of Castleblayney, Ireland. Tom's performance of "Gentle Mother" on The Showband Show received widespread praise, preceding its eventual recorded release, reaching number 7 on the Irish charts.

==== Original line up 1966 ====
- "Big" Tom McBride – lead vocals, saxophone, rhythm guitar
- Seamus McMahon – lead guitar, fiddle, vocals
- Henry McMahon – tenor sax, vocals, bandleader, percussion
- John Beattie – keyboards, piano
- Cyril McKevitt – trombone, vocals
- Ronnie Duffy – drums, vocals
- Ginger Morgan – bass guitar, vocals

==== Irish Top Ten Songs ====
Title	Position reached	Entry date
"Gentle Mother"	7	30 January 1967
"Old Log Cabin For Sale"	4	21 October 1967
"The Sunset Years of Life"	3	23 July 1970
"Broken Marriage Vows"	1	19 February 1972
"I Love You Still"	1	4 January 1973
"Old Love Letters"	1	16 May 1974

=== 1975–1998 ===
In May 1975, lead vocalist Tom McBride (known as "Big Tom") left the band and formed a new band, "Big Tom and the Travellers", under the management of Top Rank Entertainment (owned by country music tycoon Tony Loughman). The band subsequently used other lead vocalists, including John Glenn, Tom Allen and Jan Lynch, and occasionally performed without a front man. Big Tom rejoined the band in 1989, and they continued to play and record regularly until 1998.

=== 1999 onwards ===
Due to their advancing years the band have only had occasional 'comeback' tours. They have toured more regularly in the last four years, with the original band playing together.

In 2004, Big Tom's son Dermot McBride took Ginger Morgan's place on bass guitar, Peter McCarthy took Ronnie Duffy's place on drums, and Robert Browne, a second keyboardist in the band, appeared to take Cyril McKevitt's place on trombone (however, both were performing for the band in their Q4 2005 tour). In 2005, the band recorded the hit single "The Same Way You Came In".

In November 2006, McBride suffered a sudden heart attack, jeopardising plans for future tours, but doctors later gave the all clear for him to have a mini tour of Ireland in February, 2008. It was believed that the band would revert to the seven original Mainliners for this tour. Cyril McKevitt died of a heart attack on 15 September 2009, just days after the end of the band's summer 2009 tour. Martin Campbell filled McKevitt's position one year later. From 2014 the band continued to tour on a regular basis, including eight dates in 2015–16.

Big Tom died on 17 April 2018, at the age of 81, with the band dissolving thereafter. Seamus McMahon died after a brief illness on 26 June 2019. Henry McMahon died on 31 May 2026, at the age of 84.

=== Last line up (2009–2018) ===
- Big Tom – lead vocals, rhythm guitar (died 2018)
- Seamus McMahon – lead guitar, rhythm guitar, fiddle, vocals (died 2019)
- Henry McMahon – bandleader, tenor sax, vocals, percussion (died 2026)
- John Beattie – keyboards, piano
- Martin Campbell – trombone, vocals
- Ronnie Duffy – drums, vocals
- Ginger Morgan – bass guitar, vocals
- Harry Conlon – organ
