= Livin' the Dream (album) =

Studio album by Nathan Carter
- Released: 16 June 2017
- Recorded: 2016
- Genre: Country
- Label: Decca Records

Nathan Carter chronology
Stayin' Up All Night (2016)	Livin' the Dream (2017)	Live at the Marquee Cork (2017)

Nathan Carter studio album chronology
Stayin' Up All Night (2016)	Livin' the Dream (2017)	Born for the Road (2018)

Singles from Livin' the Dream
- 1. "Livin' the Dream" Released: 16 March 2017

Livin' the Dream is the ninth studio album by English-Irish country singer Nathan Carter. It was released in Ireland on 16 June 2017 by Decca Records. The album peaked at number 1 on the Irish Albums Chart and number 51 on the UK Albums Chart. The album includes the single "Livin' the Dream".

== Singles ==
"Livin' the Dream" was released as the lead single from the album on 16 March 2017.

== Track listing ==
No.	Title	Writer(s)	Length
1.	"Livin' the Dream"	Nathan Carter; Don Mescall	4:02
2.	"Caribbean Feeling"	Carter; John Pettifer; Joe McShane; James Brady Thacker; Margaret O'Donnell	3:26
3.	"Beeswing"	Richard Thompson	3:50
4.	"Holdin' a Good Hand"	Rob Crosby; Johnny Few	2:45
5.	"Just Hasn't Happened To Me"	Carter; Don Mescall	3:59
6.	"Summer's Here"	Jody Gallagher	3:03
7.	"Riding With Private Malone"	Wood Newton; Thom Shepherd	4:42
8.	"Jealous of the Angels"	Jen Bostik; Barrett Yeretsian; Zachary Runquist; Jimmy Fortune	4:06
9.	"Me and You"	Carter; Daniel Martin	3:28
10.	"Ned of the Hill"	Carter; Trad Arr	5:17
11.	"Stay Alive"	Carter; John Ferry; JP Williams	3:07
12.	"Rollin' Home"	John David	3:57
13.	"Summer in Dublin" (Live)	Liam Reilly	4:53

== Charts ==
Chart (2017)	Peak position
Irish Albums (IRMA)	1
Scottish Albums (OCC)	15
UK Albums (OCC)	51
UK Album Downloads (OCC)	48
UK Country Albums (OCC)	2
UK Independent Albums (OCC)	7

== Release history ==
Region	Date	Format	Label
Ireland	16 June 2017	Digital download	Decca Records
