= Big Tom =

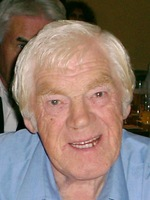
- Big Tom in November 2004

Background information
- Also known as: Big Tom
- Born: Tom McBride; 18 September 1936; Oram, County Monaghan, Ireland
- Died: 17 April 2018 (aged 81) Drogheda, Ireland
- Genres: Country; Irish; easy listening
- Occupation: Musician
- Instruments: Vocals; guitar; saxophone
- Years active: 1966–2018
- Formerly of: Big Tom and The Mainliners

Tom McBride (18 September 1936 – 17 April 2018), known as Big Tom, was an Irish country, traditional and easy listening singer, as well as a guitarist, and saxophone player.

With a career spanning over six decades, he started his career in 1966 as the frontman of the Irish showband Big Tom and The Mainliners.

== Career ==
On 1 February 2008, Big Tom began a 12-date tour of Ireland after doctors gave him the all clear. On 25 May, Big Tom performed for the closure night of the Galtymore dance hall in Cricklewood, London. On 27 July, Big Tom was the headline act at London's Irish Festival. On 23 November, Big Tom headlined the Claremorris Dance Festival weekend. In July 2009, K-MAC Records announced more dates in Ireland for Big Tom and the Mainliners, which commenced in August. From 14 August to 13 September 2009, Big Tom ran a successful tour of Ireland with large attendances to venues. The highlight was the Glencarn Hotel in Tom's hometown, Castleblayney, where the concert was packed to capacity. The tour ended in Ennis, County Clare, with fans travelling many miles to see Big Tom and the band. Two days after the end of the tour, the band's trombone player and vocalist Cyril McKevitt died of a heart attack.

In 2010, Big Tom announced an extensive series of tour dates. From 2011 until his death in 2018, Big Tom and his band continued to perform with sporadic appearances.

== Personal life ==
Big Tom lived in Oram, just outside Castleblayney. He would often be seen at the local shop on his horse, tractor or quad. He was very generous with his time and always participated in the Oram St. Patrick's Day Parade and many of the local football events. The wall in the Oram Community Centre has a huge mural of Big Tom.

Big Tom suffered from a fear of flying. In 1980, he undertook a sea voyage across the Atlantic Ocean to record his Blue Wings album in Nashville.

In 2000, Big Tom underwent a nodule operation on his throat. In November 2006, Big Tom suffered a sudden heart attack at the age of 70, which had put doubt into whether he would ever tour again with his band. On 24 March 2008, Big Tom performed at Castlebar's TF Ballroom's final farewell night (in its current guise) but he was reported to have taken ill on stage during the performance.

In September 2004, Big Tom was reported to have been on a list of Irish tax evaders. Big Tom was married to his wife Rose McBride until her death in January 2018.

== Hit songs ==
Big Tom had numerous Top 10 hits in the Irish Singles Chart:

| Title | Position reached | Entry date | Artist credited |
|---|---|---|---|
| Gentle Mother | 7 | 30 January 1967 | Big Tom and The Mainliners |
| Old Log Cabin for Sale | 4 | 21 October 1967 | Big Tom and The Mainliners |
| The Sunset Years of Life | 3 | 23 July 1970 | Big Tom and The Mainliners |
| Broken Marriage Vows | 1 | 19 February 1972 | Big Tom and The Mainliners |
| I Love You Still | 1 | 4 January 1973 | Big Tom and The Mainliners |
| Old Love Letters | 1 | 16 May 1974 | Big Tom and The Mainliners |
| Four Country Roads | 5 | 16 May 1981 | Big Tom |
| Streets of Dublin City | 7 | 15 November 1981 | Big Tom |
| If I Needed You | 10 | 18 March 1984 | Big Tom |
| Jealous Heart | 9 | 7 April 1984 | Big Tom |

== Discography ==
=== Vinyl albums ===
Prior to 1990 all of Big Tom's audio music releases (over 20 albums) were on vinyl record (or cassette) and are now out of print. Since 1990 the release format became CD (or cassette).

| Title | Artist credited | Year | Record label | Issue Code | |
|---|---|---|---|---|---|
| The All Time Hits of | Big Tom and The Mainliners | | Emerald | GES1051 | Big Tom and The Mainliners |
| The Sunset Years Of Life | Big Tom and The Mainliners | | Emerald | GES1057 | Big Tom and The Mainliners |
| Little Bit of Country and Irish | Big Tom and The Mainliners | 1969 | Emerald | GES1076 | Big Tom and The Mainliners |
| From Ireland | Big Tom and The Mainliners | 1970 | Emerald | GES1077 | Big Tom and The Mainliners |
| I'll Settle For Old Ireland | Big Tom and The Mainliners | 1971 | Emerald | GES1102 | Big Tom and The Mainliners |
| Requests! | Big Tom and The Mainliners | 1972 | Denver | DEB102 | Big Tom and The Mainliners |
| Image of Me | Big Tom and The Mainliners | | Denver | DNV 2 | Big Tom and The Mainliners |
| Ashes of Love | Big Tom and The Mainliners | | Denver | DNV 3 | Big Tom and The Mainliners |
| Smoke Along The Track | Big Tom and The Mainliners | | Denver | DNV 4 | Big Tom and The Mainliners |
| Souvenirs | Big Tom and The Mainliners | 1975 | Denver | DNV 5 | Big Tom and The Mainliners |
| When The Roses Bloom Again | Big Tom & The Travellers | 1975 | Denver | DNV 6 | |
| Travel On | Big Tom & The Travellers | 1977 | Denver | DNV 7 | |
| I Would Like To See You Again | Big Tom & The Travellers | 1978 | Denver | DNV 8 | |
| At The Irish Festival | Big Tom & The Travellers | 1979 | Denver | DNV 9 | |
| Blue Wings | Big Tom | 1980 | Denver | DNV 10 | |
| Four Country Roads | Big Tom & The Travellers | 1981 | Denver | DNV 11 | |
| Songs From Home and Faraway | Big Tom & The Travellers | 1982 | Denver | DNV 12 | |
| | Big Tom & The Travellers | | Denver | DNV 14 | |
| Teardrops in the Snow | Big Tom & The Travellers | 1985 | Denver | DNV 15 | |
| Around Ireland | Big Tom & The Travellers | 1986 | Denver | DNV 16 | |

==== Compilation vinyl albums ====
| Title | Artist credited | Year | Record label | Issue code |
|---|---|---|---|---|
| Favourites | | 1980 | K-Tel | KLP55 |
| The Heart of Country Music | Big Tom | 1979 | Denver | DEB107 |
| King of Country Music – Volume 1 | Big Tom | 1977 | Denver | BT1 |
| King of Country Music – Volume 2 | Big Tom | 1977 | Denver | BT2 |
| King of Country Music – Volume 3 | Big Tom | 1977 | Denver | BT3 |
| King of Country Music – Volume 4 | Big Tom | 1977 | Denver | BT4 |
| King of Country Music – Volume 5 | Big Tom | 1977 | Denver | BT5 |
| King of Country Music – Volume 6 | Big Tom | 1977 | Denver | BT6 |
| Hits by the Dozen | | | Denver | DEB105 |

=== CD albums ===
The CD releases typically contain tracks which were previously issued on vinyl, however those marked * consist all tracks newly recorded and those marked ** consist of some tracks newly recorded. The 20 Golden Greats CD may be discontinued as all tracks have been reissued on latter CDs.
The Greatest Hits CD includes two tracks taken from the Live at the Glencarn Hotel video. The Live at The Galtymore CD is solely the soundtrack from the video of same name recorded in 1991.
It is intended by Big Tom's record company to reissue all vinyl tracks on to CD releases.

| Title | Artist credited | Year |
|---|---|---|
| Today ** | Big Tom and The Mainliners | c.1990 |
| Greatest hits | Big Tom and The Mainliners | c.1991 |
| 20 Golden Greats | Big Tom and The Mainliners | 1992 |
| Out on Their Own * | Big Tom and The Mainliners | 1993 |
| The Sweetest Gift * | Big Tom and The Mainliners | 1995 |
| Songs I Like To Sing | Big Tom | c.1996 |
| 25 Golden Greats | Big Tom | 1996 |
| Souvenirs | Big Tom | c.1998 |
| Blue Wings (In Nashville) | Big Tom | c.1999 |
| The Irish Collection | Big Tom | 1999 |
| The Very Best of Irish Country | Big Tom | 1999 |
| Smoke Along The Track | Big Tom | c.2000 |
| When The Roses Bloom Again | Big Tom | 2002 |
| The Same Way You Came In ** | Big Tom with Seamus McMahon | 2005 |
| Teardrops in the Snow | Big Tom | April 2007 |
| Around Ireland ** | Big Tom | March 2008 |
| Ashes of Love | Big Tom and The Mainliners | August 2009 |
| Four Country Roads | Big Tom and The Travellers | August 2009 |
| The Image of Me | Big Tom and The Mainliners | August 2009 |
| Requests | Big Tom and The Mainliners | August 2009 |
| Live at The Galtymore | Big Tom and The Mainliners | June 2010 |
| I am an Island * | Big Tom and The Mainliners | November 2010 |
| Songs From Home & Faraway | Big Tom | October 2011 |
| Travel On | Big Tom and The Travellers | October 2012 |
| Lonesome at Your Table | Big Tom and the Mainliners | April 2013 The Ultimate Collection vol.1 Big Tom Due April 2014 |

Tom also recorded a duet track in 2009 with Frank Nelson: Treasured Memories which is featured on Frank's album of the same name.

=== Videos/DVDs ===
- Live at the Glencarn Hotel, Castleblayney
- Live at the Galtymore, London
- In Concert at the Ardhowen Theatre, Enniskillen
- The Sweetest Gift
- The Very Best of (Compilation)
- Back to Castleblayney, Live
- Galtymore 2004, Live
- Live in Birmingham and Manchester
- Live in Castlebar 2008 (featuring The London Irish Festival)
- Big Tom and the Mainliners – A Celebration (2016)

== Legacy ==
On 8 July 2005, a plaque was erected by the local community in Big Tom's home village of Castleblayney, County Monaghan.

In early 2016, Big Tom and the original Mainliners went on tour to mark 50 years since the release of their most enduring hit "Gentle Mother". From May until September, Big Tom and the Mainliners continued their summer tour to celebrate 50 years of "Gentle Mother"

In June 2016, Big Tom became the inaugural artist to be inducted into the Irish Country Music Hall of Fame.

Susan McCann had a hit in 1977 with her recording of Big Tom Is Still The King, referring to Waylon Jennings song Bob Wills Is Still the King.
