= Foreglen =

Village in County Londonderry, Northern Ireland

Coordinates: 54.926°N 7.129°W

Foreglen: Irish: An Forghleann
- Village and Townland
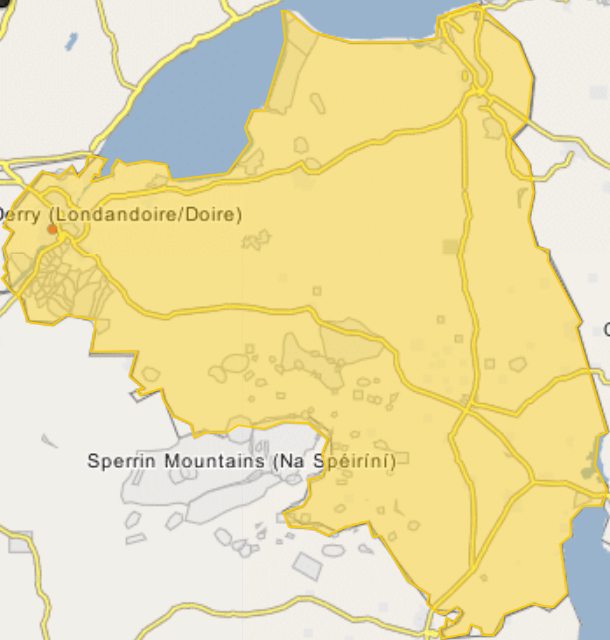
- Location within Northern Ireland
- District: Causeway Coast and Glens
- County: County Londonderry
- Country: Northern Ireland
- Sovereign state: United Kingdom
- Police: Northern Ireland
- Fire: Northern Ireland
- Ambulance: Northern Ireland
- UK Parliament: East Londonderry
- NI Assembly: East Londonderry

Foreglen (Irish: An Forghleann, meaning 'The Outer Glenn') is a village in County Londonderry, Northern Ireland. Around 1900 it was known as Ballymoney (not to be confused with the town of Ballymoney in County Antrim).

== Education ==
- St Peter's and St Paul's Primary School.

== Sport ==
The local Gaelic Athletic Association club is O'Brien's GAC.

== See also ==
- List of villages in Northern Ireland
- List of towns in Northern Ireland
