= Wagon Wheel (album) =

Studio album by Nathan Carter
- Released: 20 November 2012
- Recorded: 2011
- Genre: Country
- Label: Decca Records; Sharpe Music

Nathan Carter chronology
The Live Show (2012)	Wagon Wheel (2012)	Where I Wanna Be (2013)

Nathan Carter studio album chronology
Time of My Life (2011)	Wagon Wheel (2012)	Where I Wanna Be (2013)

Singles from Wagon Wheel
- 1. "Wagon Wheel" Released: 15 June 2012; 2. "Caledonia" Released: 2013

Wagon Wheel is the fourth studio album by English-Irish country singer Nathan Carter. It was released in Ireland on 20 November 2012 by Decca Records and Sharpe Music. The album peaked at number 6 on the Irish Albums Chart. The album includes the singles "Wagon Wheel" and "Caledonia".

== Singles ==
"Wagon Wheel" was released as the lead single from the album on 15 June 2012. The album peaked at number 14 on the Irish Singles Chart. "Caledonia" was released as the second single from the album.

== Track listing ==
No.	Title	Length
1.	"Wagon Wheel"	4:12
2.	"Long Time Gone"	3:23
3.	"Hug"	4:08
4.	"Pub Crawl"	2:56
5.	"Caledonia"	4:36
6.	"Tequila Makes Her Clothes Fall Off"	3:08
7.	"You've Got a Friend in Me"	2:38
8.	"Drift Away"	3:20
9.	"Botany Bay"	3:07
10.	"Back to Tourmakeady"	3:12
11.	"Nobody's Darlin'"	4:46
12.	"If I Get an Encore"	4:38

== Charts ==
Chart (2012–13)	Peak position
Irish Albums (IRMA)	6

== Release history ==
Region	Date	Format	Label
Ireland	20 November 2012	Digital download	Decca Records; Sharpe Music
