= Robert Mizzell =

American-born-Irish country music singer (born 1971)

Robert Mizzell (born July 21, 1971) is an American-born-Irish country music singer.

== Career ==
Mizell was born July 21, 1971, in Shreveport, Louisiana. He relocated to Ireland in the early 1990s after finishing service in the U.S. Army. He settled in Mullingar, County Westmeath. He became a Country and Irish singer, notably being a member of The Three Amigos with Jimmy Buckley (replaced by Gary Gamble in 2026) and Patrick Feeney.

On April 15, 2022, Mizzell appeared on The Late Late Show.

On September 28, 2025, Mizzell sang the U.S. National Anthem at Croke Park, during the NFL game between the Minnesota Vikings and the Pittsburgh Steelers.
