= Wagon Wheel (song) =

2004 single by Old Crow Medicine Show

Single by Old Crow Medicine Show

from the album O.C.M.S.
- Released: February 10, 2004
- Recorded: 2003
- Studio: RCA Studio B, Nashville, Tennessee
- Genre: Alt-country; Americana; folk; bluegrass
- Length: 3:52
- Label: Nettwerk
- Songwriters: Bob Dylan; Ketch Secor
- Producer: David Rawlings

Music video
- "Wagon Wheel" on YouTube

"Wagon Wheel" is a song co-written by Bob Dylan and Ketch Secor of Old Crow Medicine Show. Dylan recorded the chorus in 1973 while Secor added verses 25 years later. Old Crow Medicine Show's final version was certified triple Platinum by the Recording Industry Association of America in 2023. The song has been covered numerous times, including charting versions by Nathan Carter in 2012, Darius Rucker in 2013 and Nathan Evans in 2022.

== Content ==
The song describes a hitchhiking journey south along the eastern coast of the United States from New England in the northeast through Roanoke, Virginia, with the intended destination of Raleigh, North Carolina, where the narrator hopes to see his lover. As the narrator is walking south of Roanoke, he meets a trucker who is traveling from Philadelphia through Virginia westward toward the Cumberland Gap and Johnson City, Tennessee.

Old Crow Medicine Show's version of the song is in swing 2/4 time signature, with an approximate tempo of 76 half notes per minute. It uses the I–V–vi–IV pattern in the key of A major, with the main chord pattern of A–E–F♯m–D. In the music video, the guitar is played with capo on the second fret and (open chord equivalents) G-D-Em-C-G-D-C.

== Background and writing ==
I'd gotten a (Bob) Dylan bootleg in like ninth grade and I let (band co-founder) Ketch (Secor) listen to it, and he wrote the verses because Bob kind of mumbles them and that was it. We've been playing that song since we were like 17, and it's funny because we've never met Dylan, but the song is technically co-written by Bob Dylan. What's great about "Wagon Wheel" is that it has grown organically. The popularity of it was all based on word of mouth. There was no radio airplay for it. We made a music video for it, but it wasn't "November Rain" or anything. No one was like, 'Oh my God, what's this video about?' And 16 years later, it went gold, then Darius Rucker cut it.

— Chris "Critter" Fuqua

"Wagon Wheel" is composed of two different parts. The melody for the song and the lyrics to the chorus come from a demo titled "Rock Me, Mama" that was originally written and recorded by Bob Dylan during the Pat Garrett and Billy the Kid sessions in February 1973. Although never officially released, the Dylan song was released on a bootleg recording, usually named after the chorus and its refrain, "Rock Me, Mama". Dylan left the song an unfinished sketch.

Ketch Secor of Old Crow Medicine Show wrote verses for the song around Dylan's original chorus and melody.

Chris "Critter" Fuqua, Secor's school friend and future bandmate, first brought home a Bob Dylan bootleg from a family trip to London containing the rough outtake called "Rock Me, Mama". Not "so much a song as a sketch, crudely recorded featuring most prominently a stomping boot, the candy-coated chorus and a mumbled verse that was hard to make out", the tune kept going through Secor's mind.

A few months later, while attending Phillips Exeter Academy in New Hampshire and "feeling homesick for the South," he added verses about "hitchhiking his way home full of romantic notions Beat poets and, most of all, Dylan." Secor's verses tell "the story of a man who travels from New England, through Philadelphia, and Roanoke, down the eastern coast of the United States, ending up in Raleigh, North Carolina, where he hopes to see his lover."

The Secor lyrics contain a geographic impossibility: the trucker is said to be heading "west from the Cumberland Gap to Johnson City, Tennessee", but Johnson City is actually east of the Cumberland Gap. As Secor explains, "I got some geography wrong, but I still sing it that way. I just wanted the word 'west' in there. 'West' has got more power than 'east.'"

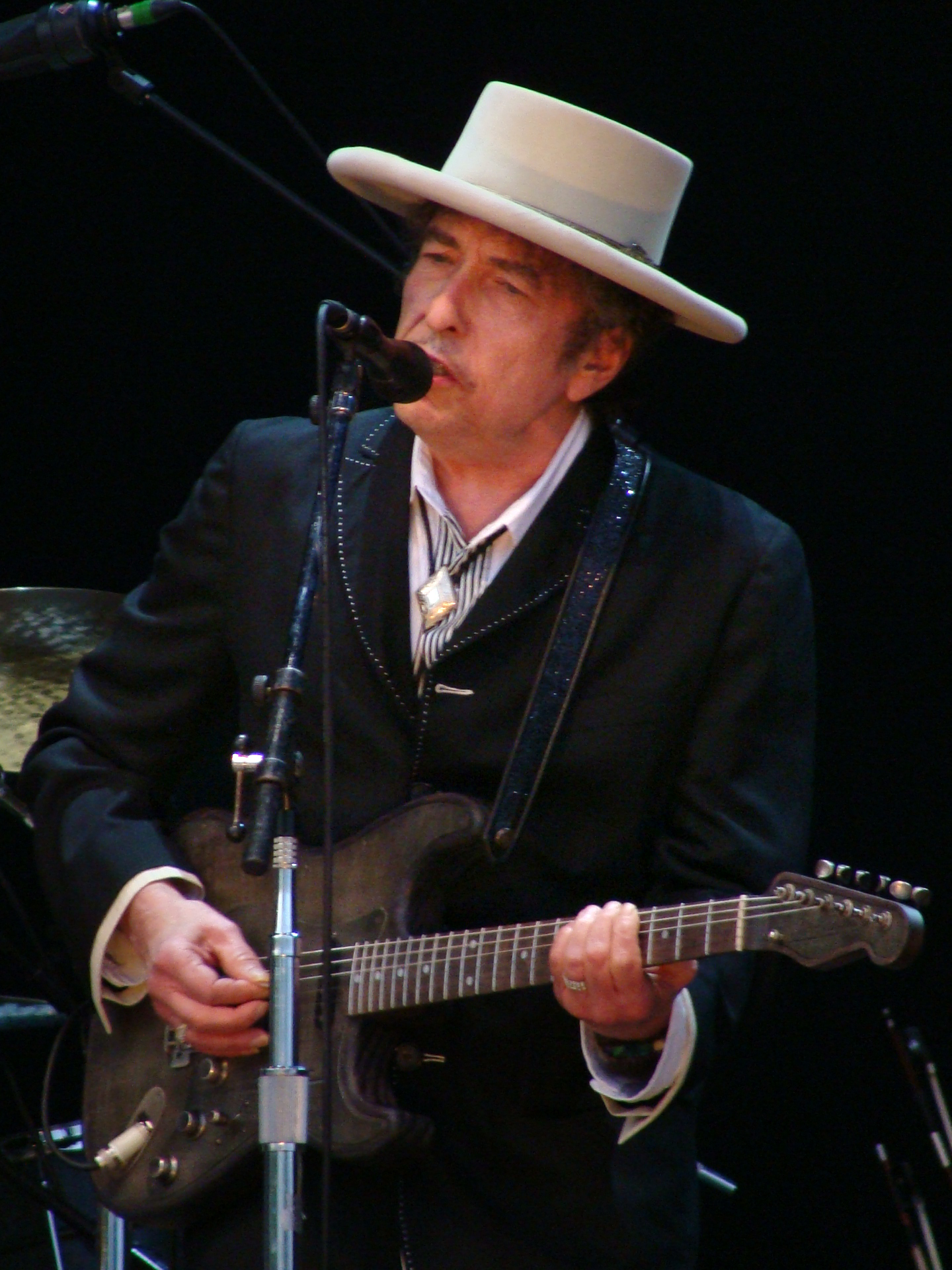
Bob Dylan performing in Vitoria-Gasteiz, in Northern Spain, during the Azkena Rock Festival on June 26, 2010.

== Creative rights ==
Secor saw the Dylan contribution as "an outtake of something he had mumbled out on one of those tapes. I sang it all around the country from about 17 to 26, before I ever even thought, 'Oh, I better look into this.'" When Secor sought copyright on the song in 2003 to release it on O.C.M.S. in (2004), he discovered Dylan credited the phrase "Rock me, mama" to bluesman Arthur "Big Boy" Crudup, who recorded a song with this title in 1944. He likely got it from a Big Bill Broonzy recording "Rockin' Chair Blues" from 1940 using the phrase "rock me, baby". The phrase "like a wagon wheel" is used in the 1939 Curtis Jones song "Roll Me Mama" that includes the lines "Now roll me over, just like I'm a wagon wheel" and "just like I ain't got no bone". He re-recorded it in 1963 as "Roll Me Over", with some of the lyrics. In the meantime, Lil' Son Jackson came up with "Rockin' and Rollin" in 1950 using the phrase "Roll me, baby, like you roll a wagon wheel". As Secor says: "In a way, it's taken something like 85 years to get completed." Secor and Dylan signed a co-writing agreement, and share copyright on the song; agreeing to a "50-50 split in authorship." When Secor discovered the famous singer-songwriter was willing to publish the song with Old Crow, he, like earlier claimed originators, disavowed authorship:

(Dylan) said ‘I didn’t write that; Arthur Crudup did.’ Arthur Crudup said, ‘I didn’t write that; [Big] Bill Broonzy wrote that.’ Bill’s first recording of the derivative of ‘Rock Me Mama’ is around 1928. That’s a true folk song—one that has gathered a lot of dust on the fender before it ever rolled into your town. And songs like that tend to last longer because they’ve been influenced by such lasting voices.

Secor recalls that "I met (Dylan's son) Jakob, and Jakob said it made sense that I was a teenager when I did that because no one in their 30s would have the guts to try to write a Bob Dylan song."

== Popularity ==
It sort of exists separately from the world of things that are on the radio. "Wagon Wheel" has made it around the camp fires and the jam sessions and the parking lot scenes, in a way that songs of this decade or the last decade tend not to. When you go to a drum circle at a camp fire, you'll hear songs that are 40 years old that a kid with a hemp leash just learned, like "The Weight" by The Band, and then you're going to hear "Wagon Wheel."

— Ketch Secor

As Old Crow Medicine Show's signature song, "Wagon Wheel" is in some ways bigger than the group itself—even though the song's origins predate formation of the musical act. The song has become extremely popular since its inclusion on Old Crow Medicine Show's major label debut, O.C.M.S. in 2004; it was released as its lead single two weeks prior to the album's release, although the song also appeared in an earlier form on the now out-of-print EP Troubles Up and Down the Road in 2001. The group reportedly performed the song at the Station Inn in Nashville in 2001, as part of a series of songs commemorating Bob Dylan's 60th birthday.

This "catchy country-infused sing-along" has "taken on the status of 'Free Bird'"—"in that it has become a bar room staple that drunks love to loudly request at every show, regardless of who the band is". John Cranford with music label Swampfire Records—who organize a regular jam session on Hilton Head Island, South Carolina called Swampfire Sessions—says "It has become our generation's 'Freebird.'"

Lately, it's been open season on "Wagon Wheel," which has become the acoustic musician's "Freebird," one of the very few songs that people actually know well enough to find it funny to request.

— The Portland Phoenix

The group's version of the song was certified platinum by the Recording Industry Association of America in April 2013, and three-times platinum in November, 2023. To celebrate they released a limited edition 7" vinyl record of the song with "All Night Long (Live)" on the B-side. Secor himself enjoys its popularity, saying in mid-2008, "I don't mind playing it every night. I like to see what it does to people, and it's nice to have something that's guaranteed, especially when you're shuffling through new material." Of its popularity he says:

Most of all, the reason why that song is so popular is because of Bob Dylan and his magical touch. Bob Dylan cast a spell with every song he made, particularly in 1973, when he wrote that chorus. I’m convinced that he put down his legal pad after he wrote that chorus, and he scrapped it because he wrote "Knockin’ on Heaven’s Door."

=== Bans ===
The song has been performed so often live at venues and events that some actually discourage its performance. At the Swampfire Sessions, Cranford states: "We banned it. (We) literally put signs up that said 'Absolutely No Wagon Wheel.'" The New England Americana Festival sells a shirt with an image of a wagon wheel with a line through it — creating a "no 'Wagon Wheel' zone".

The song is basically inescapable. It's as much a part of country music as the classics like "Hello Walls" or "Islands in the Stream." That's a big claim, sure, but how many other country songs actually get banned from clubs they're played and requested so much?

— Wide Open Country

"Man, some of us hate that song," Cranford said. "Others play it all the time." Often playing "Wagon Wheel" on request, he quit doing so after Rucker's cover. "This song was great when Dylan wrote it and Old Crow played it, but once Darius Rucker flooded the airwaves with his version, all hope was lost," Cranford said.

"Wagon Wheel" has even been permanently banned at The Little Grill diner where Secor and Fuqua first performed. "Ketch Secor is allowed to play 'Wagon Wheel', and Critter Fuqua can play it if he wants to," says Ron Copeland, owner of the venue at the time, "but other than that it is actually banned."

== Music video ==
Old Crow Medicine Show released a music video for "Wagon Wheel" to YouTube on September 7, 2006. It features the band serving as the musical accompaniment to a burlesque sideshow at a traveling carnival. The video features cameo appearances by Gillian Welch and David Rawlings, who appear as ticket takers for the show. Rawlings also produced and played guitar on the track.

As of April 2025, the video has over 84 million views on YouTube.

== Certifications ==
| Region | Certification | Certified units/sales |
|---|---|---|
| Canada (Music Canada) | Gold | 40,000^{*} |
| United States (RIAA) | 3× Platinum | 3,000,000^{‡} |
^{*} Sales figures based on certification alone.^{‡} Sales+streaming figures based on certification alone.

== Nathan Carter version ==
"Wagon Wheel"

Single by Nathan Carter

from the album Wagon Wheel
- Released: June 15, 2012
- Recorded: 2012
- Genre: Pop; Country and Irish; country pop
- Length: 4:12
- Label: Sharpe
- Songwriters: Bob Dylan; Ketch Secor

Nathan Carter singles chronology
| "Wagon Wheel" (2012) | "Caledonia" (2013) |

Music video
- "Wagon Wheel" on YouTube

The English-Irish singer Nathan Carter covered the song in a release June 15, 2012, a few weeks before the song was covered by Darius Rucker in the United States. The Carter version was the title track taken from his 2012 album, Wagon Wheel. The album was a commercial success, hitting the Top Three in the Irish Album Chart. Carter won the RTÉ Irish Country Music Awards for Live Act of the Year in 2013 and his version won the award of Ireland's All-Time Favourite Country Song. He appeared with a live version of the song on the popular The Late Late Show on RTÉ, being his first appearance on the show. In March 2014, he released a live edition on his second live album. The album peaked at number one on the Irish Albums Chart. He also toured in Ireland, Northern Ireland, England and Scotland to promote the album.

Although released independently on Sharpe Music, the song became a huge hit for Carter and was his first hit song in England and on the Irish Singles Chart. The single spent 47 weeks on the chart in its initial release. It was the biggest commercial success of any Country and Irish release in 2012 and considered a crossover hit in the mainstream pop charts. It is the most successful version in the UK and Ireland with its re-entry in the charts later in 2013, it has totaled 52 weeks in the Irish Singles Chart (as of December 5, 2013).

=== Track listing ===
Various versions are available through iTunes including:

- "Wagon Wheel" – Nathan Carter – single – (4:12)
- "Wagon Wheel" (radio dance mix) – Nathan Carter and Micky Modelle – (3:46)
- "Wagon Wheel" (club mix) – Nathan Carter and Micky Modelle – (3:23)

=== Music video ===
Carter released a music video of the song which features an outing on the beach where Carter sings the song with his band to his friends on the beach with those present joining in clapping and dancing. The video was filmed on Rossnowlagh beach in County Donegal, Ireland.

== Darius Rucker version ==
"Wagon Wheel"

Single by Darius Rucker

from the album True Believers
- Released: January 7, 2013
- Genre: Country; Bluegrass
- Length: 4:57 (album version); 2:53 (radio edit); 4:02 (album version)
- Label: Capitol Nashville
- Songwriters: Bob Dylan; Ketch Secor
- Producer: Frank Rogers

Darius Rucker singles chronology
| "True Believers" (2012) | "Wagon Wheel" (2013) | "Radio" (2013) |

Music video
- "Wagon Wheel" on YouTube

Darius Rucker recorded a country version of the song with backing vocals from Lady Antebellum as the second single on his third solo project, True Believers, released on Capitol Records. He joined Old Crow Medicine Show at the Grand Ole Opry July 6, 2012, "for a special rendition of 'Wagon Wheel'" where the fans "went crazy over Rucker's cover of the Old Crow Medicine Show hit." After this reception he tweeted out: "Secret out after @opry perf. I recorded a version of 'Wagon Wheel' for my new record and @ladyantebellum sings on track."

=== Backstory ===
The song did not at first appeal to Rucker. "Somebody had played 'Wagon Wheel' for me years ago," he said. "It was one of those things that I didn't really get." The faculty band at his daughter's high school performing had a different effect, as he relates,

We were watching my daughter, and the faculty band gets up. It's just the faculty from her school, and they play "Wagon Wheel." I'm sitting in the audience, and they get to the middle of the chorus, and I turned to my wife, and I go, "I've got to cut this song."

With guidance from Frank Liddell, Rucker cut the song with Lady A on backing vocals. He told Taste of Country: "Lady Antebellum took the song to a new level. Up until they added their vocals, I thought it was another song on the record."

Rucker had been introduced to Fuqua's source for Dylan's outtake years prior: "I got turned onto the Pat Garrett soundtrack when I worked retail back in the day. It's so different from a lot of his other stuff. It's such a cool record." Rucker also previously had had some experience with crediting Dylan on a song he'd performed. His group Hootie and the Blowfish's 1995 hit single "Only Wanna Be With You" quotes an entire verse from Dylan's 1975 song "Idiot Wind". When the record began selling big, the "Dylan camp" took issue, and Dylan was ultimately credited as a co-writer. As Rucker remembers, "They wanted some money, and they got it. We weren't trying to rip anybody off."

On July 2, 2026, Rucker reposted a video of the USA Men’s National Soccer team singing "Wagon Wheel" as karaoke, celebrating their victory over Bosnia and Herzegovina in the FiFA World Cup (to his X account). To the clip, which features a U.S. team member "belting his heart out" over an instrumental version of the tune, Rucker added the caption: “LETS FRIGGIN GO!!!!!!!!!” When an X user called him out on claiming authorship, Rucker replied: “I never once said I wrote it."

=== Genre ===
For Rucker it was largely an issue of musical genre and the high school group changing his thinking on it: "I knew the song, and to me it was such a perfect bluegrass tune that I didn't think I could do it. But they did a country version of it, with drums and pedal steel. I was like, 'Wait a minute. That would be a great country song.'" On deciding to go country with it, Rucker says:

It's such the perfect country song. When we were cutting it, all we had (to model it on) was this perfect bluegrass song. I couldn't do it as a bluegrass song. It's just not me. So if we were going to do it, we had to make it a 1950s country song. I'm not shocked at how successful it's been, but I didn't expect it.

"It's another interesting chapter in the history of a song that's slowly working its way toward American classic status. Like 'House of the Rising Sun' or 'Good Night, Irene,' it's now a pop song with a long back story that tantalizingly trickles out before you reach the wellspring."

— Chris Talbott (on Rucker version)

When asked if he thought his recording would be nominated for a Grammy Award, Rucker responded: "If 'Wagon Wheel' doesn't get nominated for a GRAMMY, country music is screwed. It's as simple as that. I'm not saying I should win it, but it should be nominated."

=== Critical reception ===
Matt Bjorke of Roughstock gave Rucker's version a five-star rating. Billy Dukes of Taste of Country gave Rucker's version four and a half stars out of five. As to the reaction of the originating group, Rucker says, "I think the Old Crow Medicine Show guys are very happy about it, and that's all that matters to me." On Rucker's version of the song, Chris 'Critter' Fuqua of Old Crow Medicine Show says:

I love it. He actually played with us at (The Grand Ole) Opry, and it was great. I think he sees something special in that song and understands it. He's a country music fan and, more than that, he just loves music and loves playing. I'm really glad he cut the track. It's been good for him and good for us, but I'm just waiting for the time when people come up to me and say, "I love when you guys played that Darius Rucker cover."

Rucker's version was nominated as Single of the Year for the 48th Country Music Association Awards along with Florida Georgia Line ("Cruise"), Tim McGraw with Taylor Swift and Keith Urban ("Highway Don't Care"), Miranda Lambert ("Mama's Broken Heart") and Kacey Musgraves ("Merry Go 'Round"). Rucker closed the televised awards show with the song November 6, 2013.

I didn't know how big it was until after I cut it, until after it was a single. I didn't know that every college student south of the Mason–Dixon line in the last eight years knows this song. I had no idea. I thought it was just another Old Crow song until I recorded it and realized it wasn't just another Old Crow song.

— Darius Rucker

Rucker won the Grammy Award for Best Country Solo Performance at the 56th Annual Grammy Awards (held January 26, 2014) for his version of "Wagon Wheel". Rucker's win makes him only the second solo African American after Charley Pride to be both nominated for and win a vocal performance Grammy award in a country music category. Other nominees up for the same award were Lee Brice for "I Drive Your Truck", Hunter Hayes for "I Want Crazy", Miranda Lambert for "Mama's Broken Heart" and Blake Shelton for "Mine Would Be You".

In August 2016 Taste of Country placed the Rucker version of "Wagon Wheel" 17th on its list of "Top Country Songs of the Century".

=== Music video ===
Rucker released a music video of the song on March 21, 2013, which features Uncle Si, Jase, Sadie, Korie, and Willie Robertson of the television show Duck Dynasty, along with Charles Kelley and Hillary Scott of Lady A. It was filmed in Watertown, Tennessee.

The video opens with Rucker sleeping on a tour bus, while next to him, Duck Dynasty is plays on TV, interspersed with scenes from a small town, then Rucker's hand can be seen turning back a clock. The scene then cuts to Rucker hitch-hiking with a guitar case, walking alongside a railroad track, while he briefly looks at a photograph of his girlfriend/wife. He manages to flag down Si Robertson driving a 1950s Chevrolet pick-up truck, who drops him off to a town, where he briefly performs inside a general store, where he is seen by Willie Robertson, alongside Korie and Sadie. As Rucker sits outside the store, the Robertsons pull up in a 1960s Chevrolet pick-up truck and give him a ride in the truck's bed to the next city. As Rucker walks through the city, he is spotted by Charles Kelley and Hillary Scott driving in a 1960 Buick convertible, who take him to the country bar where he is scheduled to play. As they enter the bar, Jase Robertson attempts to stop him from entering the stage, but Rucker's girlfriend/wife who evidently works at the bar intervenes and Rucker takes the stage with his backing band, whilst Kelley and Scott watch from the front row. As the public applauds, the scene fades out to Kelley waking Rucker up. The scene then returns to the beginning, where Duck Dynasty is playing on TV and Rucker wakes up as his alarm clock goes off, then walks up to the Robertsons and greets them, saying "I just had a crazy dream, I'll see you all after the show."

As of May 2024, the video has amassed almost 430 million views on YouTube.

=== Chart performance ===
The most popular song of his career, solo or otherwise, Rucker's "Wagon Wheel" debuted at No. 51 on the U.S. Billboard Country Airplay chart for the week of January 19, 2013. It also debuted at number 32 on the U.S. Billboard Hot Country Songs chart for the week of January 26, 2013. It debuted at No. 96 on the U.S. Billboard Hot 100 chart for the week of February 6, 2013; it debuted at 72 on the Canadian Hot 100 chart for the week of February 13, 2013. In its 10th chart week, March 20, 2013, Rucker's version made "a strong move" on Hot Country Songs, going from 11 to 5, and to 18 on Country Airplay (to 14.7 million, up 20%). Old Crow's original (from 2004) sold 15,000 and ranked 28 on Country Digital Songs the same week. The song reached number one on Hot Country Songs in its 12th week. It is his most successful song as a solo artist on the Billboard Hot 100, peaking at No. 15, as well as the Canadian Hot 100, where it peaked at number 23. By March 2014, the song has sold 2,678,000 copies in the United States, making it then the fifth best-selling song by a male country solo artist. As of October 2019, the song has sold 3,776,000 copies in the US. On October 27, 2022, the song became eleven times platinum. The song became the fourth country song to be certified diamond on October 29, 2022.

In early-May 2026 it was announced that Rucker's version of "Wagon Wheel" had been streamed a billion times on Spotify, thereby joining their Billions Club — only the 15th country song reach this traffic milestone. Rucker and Secor were "surprised" with the Spotify Billions Club plaque before Rucker’s July 25, 2026 show at Red Rocks Park & Amphitheatre in Colorado. Rucker and Secor performed the song together later that night for the sold-out Red Rocks audience.

=== Charts ===
==== Weekly charts ====
| Chart (2013) | Peak position |
|---|---|
| Canada Hot 100 (Billboard) | 23 |
| Canada Country (Billboard) | 1 |
| US Billboard Hot 100 | 15 |
| US Hot Country Songs (Billboard) | 1 |
| US Country Airplay (Billboard) | 1 |

==== Year-end charts ====
| Chart (2013) | Position |
|---|---|
| Canada (Canadian Hot 100) | 80 |
| US Billboard Hot 100 | 54 |
| US Hot Country Songs (Billboard) | 2 |
| US Country Airplay (Billboard) | 28 |

=== Certifications ===
| Region | Certification | Certified units/sales |
|---|---|---|
| Canada (Music Canada) | 3× Platinum | 240,000^{*} |
| New Zealand (RMNZ) | 8× Platinum | 240,000^{‡} |
| United Kingdom (BPI) | Platinum | 600,000^{‡} |
| United States (RIAA) | 11× Platinum | 11,000,000 |
^{*} Sales figures based on certification alone.^{‡} Sales+streaming figures based on certification alone.

== In popular culture ==
South Dakota Democratic U.S. Senate candidate Rick Weiland sang a parody of the song "with lyrics rewritten to match his campaign message" at a campaign "folk-rock concert" at the Strawbale Winery north of Sioux Falls in October 2014. Parody lyrics included the line: "I can't run a nine million-dollar campaign, but I don't have EB-5 to explain". Senator and 2016 Democratic vice presidential candidate Tim Kaine played the song on harmonica with local act Nikki Talley and Jason Sharp at the Catawba Brewing Company in Asheville, North Carolina on August 15, 2016.

In 2019, as part of the release of Ken Burns' miniseries Country Music, Bank of America released a video of the song, featuring six musicians from across the United States, with the tag line "Nothing connects the country like country." Each musician sang one line for the first six lines of the song.

In 2023, English football team Leyton Orient secured promotion to SkyBet League One, and "Wagon Wheel" became the unofficial song of their season. Midfielder George Moncur introduced it to the squad, who sang it in the dressing room following the promotion. The song was played prior to the club’s title-winning game versus Crewe Alexandra, and announcer Barry Galvin sang it in the changing rooms after the side secured the title victory.
