= Mick Flavin =

- Born: 1949 or 1950 (age 75–76); Ballinamuck, County Longford, Ireland
- Genres: Country
- Occupation: Singer
- Instruments: vocals, accordion
- Years active: 1976–present
- Label: Prism Records

Mick Flavin (born 1949 or 1950) is an Irish country singer from Ballinamuck in County Longford. Flavin recorded his first album in Athlone in June 1986. His first big hit was "I'm Gonna Make It After All". Flavin's recordings of "Jennifer Johnston & Me" (1989) and "The Waltz Of Angels" (1998) reached number 22 and number 10 respectively in the Irish Singles Chart. According to his website, in 2005 he was nominated for the Country Music Association's "Global Artist Award".
