= Christmas Stuff =

Studio album by Nathan Carter
- Released: 8 December 2014
- Recorded: 2014
- Genre: Country
- Label: Decca Records

Nathan Carter chronology
The Wagon Wheel Show – Live (2014)	Christmas Stuff (2014)	Beautiful Life (2015)

Nathan Carter studio album chronology
Where I Wanna Be (2013)	Christmas Stuff (2014)	Beautiful Life (2015)

Christmas Stuff is the sixth studio album by English-Irish country singer Nathan Carter. It was released in Ireland on 8 December 2014 by Decca Records. The album peaked at number 8 on the Irish Albums Chart.

== Track listing ==
No.	Title	Length
1.	"Christmas Stuff"
2.	"Santa Claus Is Comin' to Town"
3.	"The Christmas Song"
4.	"Sleigh Ride"
5.	"The Star Still Shines"
6.	"Rudolph's Rocking Christmas (Medley)"
7.	"Oh Holy Night"
8.	"Winter Wonderland"
9.	"When a Child Is Born"
10.	"Blue Christmas"
11.	"Christmas Kiss"
12.	"Silent Night"

== Charts ==
Chart (2014)	Peak position
Irish Albums (IRMA)	8

== Release history ==
Region	Date	Format	Label
Ireland	8 December 2014	Digital download	Decca Records
