= Johnny McCauley =

Irish country singer

Johnny McCauley (23 April 1925 – 22 March 2012) was an Irish singer-songwriter, born in Myroe, near Limavady, County Londonderry in Northern Ireland. As a young adult, he moved to London and in 1953 began singing professionally with his band, the Westernaires, at the Galtymore Club, Cricklewood.

Always a country music fan, he started to write and release songs on his own Denver Records label and formed a band of his own, 'The Johnny McCauley Trio', which toured extensively in and around London. It was not long before his songs were being covered by a host of Irish singing stars. His blend of American country sounds with Irish-based lyrics proved a winning combination. The members of the Johnny McCauley Trio were Johnny McCauley (guitar and vocals), Johnny O'Shea (vocals and drums) and Paddy Kelly (vocals and accordion).

He wrote more than 80 songs, including "Destination Donegal", "Among The Wicklow Hills", "Pretty Little Girl From Omagh" and "Four Country Roads". Others include John Wayne and Barry McGuigan tribute songs. Artists ranging from Christy Moore to Daniel O'Donnell have recorded his songs; O'Donnell's first studio recording, "My Donegal Shore", was composed by McCauley.

His songs continue to be recorded and performed by many singers around the world. McCauley's nephew Paul McCauley recorded several of his songs and performed them during his solo shows in the late 1990s. Paul commented at the time how surprised he was that so many people throughout the country were so familiar with McCauley's music, and how it impacted people's lives. Paul said "it really is wonderful to think that Johnny created Irish country through his love of the American country scene".

Johnny McCauley died in London on 22 March 2012.
