= Stayin' Up All Night =

Studio album by Nathan Carter
- Released: 29 April 2016
- Recorded: 2014
- Genre: Country
- Label: Decca

Nathan Carter chronology
Live at the Marquee (2015)	Stayin' Up All Night (2016)	Livin' the Dream (2017)

Nathan Carter studio album chronology
Beautiful Life (2015)	Stayin' Up All Night (2016)	Livin' the Dream (2017)

Singles from Stayin' Up All Night
- 1. "Temple Bar" Released: 2016; 2. "Liverpool" Released: 2016

Stayin' Up All Night is the eighth studio album by English-Irish singer Nathan Carter. It was released on 29 April 2016 by Decca Records. The album peaked at number one on the Irish Albums Chart and number 31 on the UK Albums Chart. The album includes the singles "Temple Bar" and "Liverpool".

== Track listing ==
No.	Title	Length
1.	"Wanna Dance"	4:44
2.	"Temple Bar"	2:59
3.	"Skinny Dippin'"	3:02
4.	"Island Town"	4:48
5.	"Wontcha Come Down"	3:23
6.	"Buy Me a Rose"	3:57
7.	"Two Doors Down"	3:11
8.	"Young to See"	3:49
9.	"Liverpool"	4:33
10.	"Good Time Girls"	3:22
11.	"Don't Know Lonely"	4:51
12.	"Banks of the Roses"	2:54
13.	"Thank You"	4:06

== Charts ==
Chart (2016)	Peak position
Irish Albums (IRMA)	1
Scottish Albums (OCC)	7
UK Albums (OCC)	31
UK Country Albums (OCC)	1

== Release history ==
Region	Date	Format	Label
Ireland	29 April 2016	Digital download	Decca
