= Nathan Carter =

Irish country singer (born 1990)

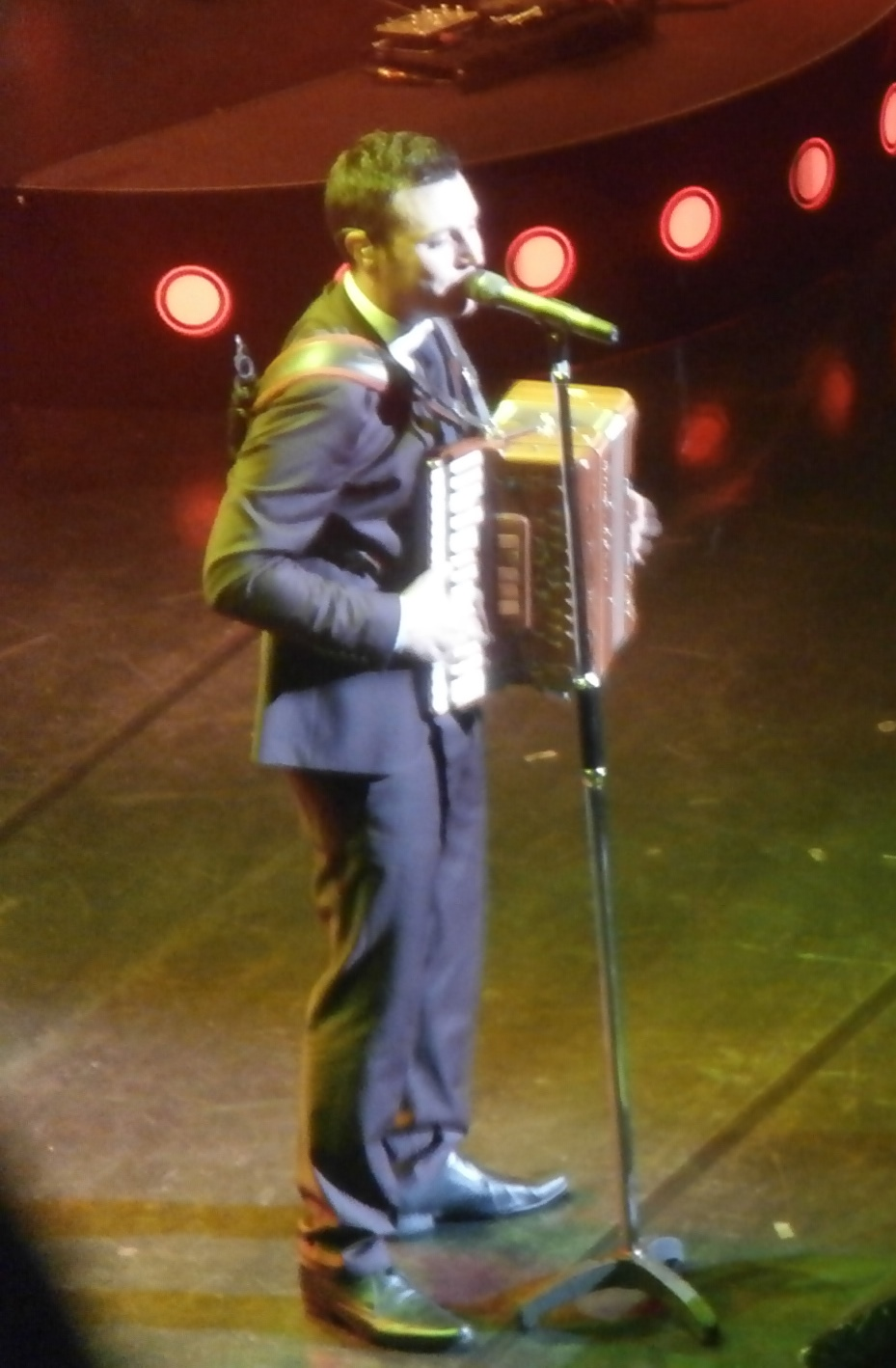
- Carter at the Glasgow Royal Concert Hall in September 2014

Background information
- Born: Nathan Kane Tyrone Carter; 28 May 1990 (age 36); Liverpool, England
- Genres: Country; Country and Irish
- Instruments: Vocals; accordion; guitar; piano
- Years active: 2002–present
- Labels: Sharpe Music (2002–2014+2018–present); Decca (2014–2017)
- Website: nathancartermusic.com

Nathan Kane Tyrone Carter (born 28 May 1990) is an Irish country music singer based in Ireland and the UK. He has released thirteen studio albums and six live albums as of December 2022, five of which peaked at number one, and four live DVDs. He performs Irish folk and country. He rose to popularity with his 2012 cover of the American country song "Wagon Wheel".

== Career ==
Carter was born in Liverpool. He went to Bishop Eton School in Allerton, Liverpool. He played the accordion at age four in a school concert, and, at age 10, won the All Ireland Title for Traditional Singing. At 18 he moved to Ireland.

His debut album, Starting Out, was released in 2007 and helped revive the genre of Country and Irish in both Ireland and Great Britain. In 2009 he associated with Irish singer songwriter John Farry, further developing his country music output.

His version of "Wagon Wheel" was released on 15 June 2012 on an album of the same name. The album was a commercial success, hitting the Top Three in the Irish Album Chart. Carter won the RTÉ Irish Country Music Awards for Live Act of the Year and Ireland's All-Time Favourite Country Song for "Wagon Wheel".

Carter released his studio album Where I Wanna Be in August 2013, followed by the follow-up Beautiful Life in 2015 which was promoted with a UK tour. Both albums topped the Irish Albums Chart. Beautiful Life became the first of his albums to chart on the UK Albums Chart.

In late 2015, Carter released Beautiful Life at Christmas, a reissue of his previous releases Beautiful Life and Christmas Stuff, along with songs from previous releases repackaged as a two-CD album. This peaked at number five on the Irish charts.

== Appearances ==
Carter appeared as the featured artist on TG4's Opry an Iúir in September 2012. The programme has since been shown on BBC Two Northern Ireland and BBC Alba.

In 2013, Carter appeared in episode 9 of Ros na Rún on Irish TV channel TG4. In the episode, Dara wants Sarah to help him with the Nathan Carter tribute night. John Joe says he can organise Carter himself to attend and, after much doubt, John Joe proves that he was telling the truth. He and Carter walk into Gaudis, where Carter performs.

He mentored Niamh McGlinchey in the 2014 version of TG4's Glór Tíre.

Carter was featured in episode 3 of Stetsons and Stilettos with the film crew spending two weeks on the road with him. The episode shows Carter preparing for a show at the Marquee in Cork.

In December 2015, he hosted The Nathan Carter Show in The Mansion House, Dublin with guests including Paddy Casey, Mary Black and The Shires.

On 9 August 2017 he was interviewed on The One Show, which was broadcast live from Ballycastle, Northern Ireland.

On 17 September 2017, he premiered his first American PBS special. The one and a half-hour program, filmed in Dublin, promoted his American tour. The program spotlighted Celtic classics, standards, American country and self written hit songs. It was titled Celtic Roots with Nathan.

== Personal life ==
Carter was born to Ian and Noreen Carter. His younger brother, Jake, is also a singer who has had success in his own right in the UK and Ireland's country music charts. He also has a sister, Kiara Carter who is a talented singer and musician .

Over the years, there was much speculation about Carter and fellow country singer Lisa McHugh. In his 2018 book Born for the Road: My Story So Far, he talks about the first time he met McHugh and said that he was attracted to her instantly. They had a brief relationship during 2015, which lasted approximately six months, but ended as neither of them was looking for anything serious. Despite their breakup, the pair have remained close friends. Carter later attended McHugh’s wedding to Nathan Khan in 2022.

=== Charity activities ===
Carter is a patron of Cancer Connect Northern Ireland.

== Discography ==
Studio albums

- Starting Out (2007)
- The Way You Love Me (2010)
- Time of My Life (2011)
- Wagon Wheel (2012)
- Where I Wanna Be (2013)
- Christmas Stuff (2014)
- Beautiful Life (2015)
- Stayin' Up All Night (2016)
- Livin' the Dream (2017)
- Born for the Road (2018)
- Irish Heartland (2019)
- Little Old Town (2021)
- The Morning After (2022)
- Music Man (2023)
- Crazy Christmas (2024)

== Filmography ==
=== DVDs ===
- 2012: The Live Show, recorded at The Burnavon Theatre, Cookstown, County Tyrone, Northern Ireland
- 2013: The Wagon Wheel Live Show, recorded at Aura Leisure Complex, Letterkenny, County Donegal
- 2015: Live at the Marquee, recorded at Live at the Marquee Festival, Cork City, Republic of Ireland
- 2016: The video collection
- 2017: Nathan Carter (Live at the Marquee Cork)
- 2017: Celtic Roots (Live)
- 2018: Live at 3Arena
- 2020: Nathan Carter Live From The Ceili House

=== Television ===
- 2012: Opry an Iúir as featured artist
- 2013: Ros na Rún (1 episode)
- 2014: Glór Tíre (mentoring Niamh McGlinchey)
- 2014: Stetsons and Stilettos (1 episode)
- 2015–present: The Nathan Carter Show
- 2017: Celtic Roots (Public Television broadcast)
- 2018: Livin' with Lucy

== Books ==
- Nathan Carter, Born for the Road: My Story So Far, Penguin Ireland.
