= Justin Moore discography =

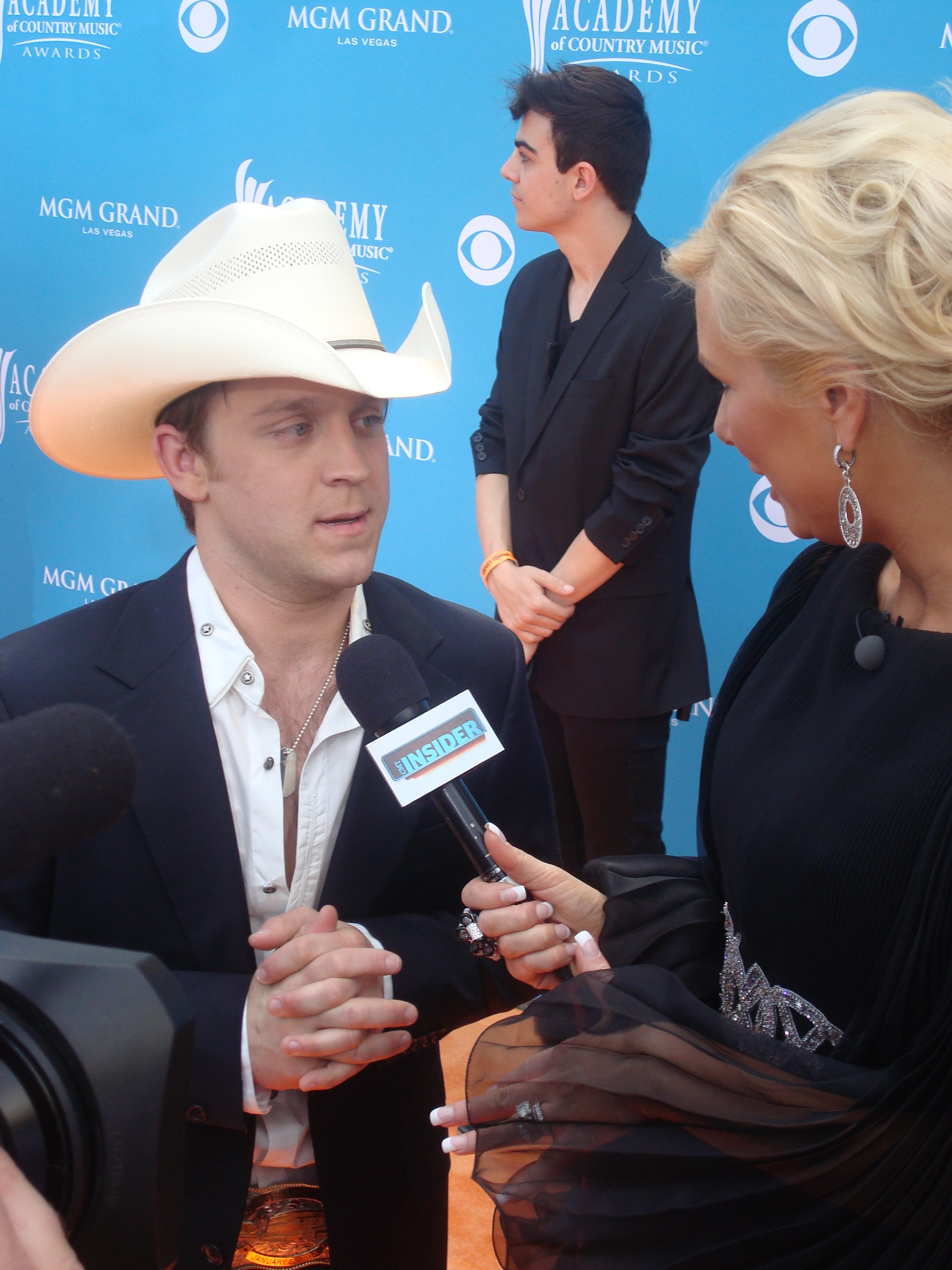
- Justin Moore in 2010
- Studio albums: 7
- EPs: 2
- Singles: 20
- Music videos: 18
- Other charted songs: 3
- Number 1 singles: 10

American country music singer Justin Moore has released seven studio albums, two extended plays, and twenty singles. Moore signed with Valory Music Group in 2007, and his first radio single, "Back That Thing Up", entered the Hot Country Songs chart in 2008. The next year, his single, "Small Town USA", became his first single to enter the Billboard Hot 100.

Moore released his first extended play (EP), The "You Asked for It" EP, in 2009. His self-titled debut album was released later that year; it produced the singles "Back That Thing Up", "Small Town USA", "Backwoods", and "How I Got to Be This Way" and has been certified platinum by the Recording Industry Association of America (RIAA). His second album, Outlaws Like Me, released in 2011, produced the singles "If Heaven Wasn't So Far Away", "Bait a Hook", and "Til My Last Day", and was also certified platinum by the RIAA. His third album, 2013's Off the Beaten Path, has been certified gold by the RIAA, and produced three singles, including "Lettin' the Night Roll", which topped the Country Airplay chart. Two further albums, Kinda Don't Care and Late Nights and Longnecks, were released in 2016 and 2019, respectively. Those two albums have produced five singles, including four which have charted at the number one position on the Country Airplay chart: "You Look Like I Need a Drink" and "Somebody Else Will" from Kinda Don't Care, and "The Ones That Didn't Make It Back Home" and "Why We Drink", from Late Nights and Longnecks.

Ten of Moore's singles have reached the number one position on Billboard's Hot Country Songs and/or Country Airplay charts. Three of these have been certified platinum by the RIAA. In addition, Moore has charted ten songs on the Billboard Hot 100 chart, eight singles on the Canada Country chart (including "You Look Like I Need a Drink" at number one), and seven songs on Canadian Hot 100 chart.

== Studio albums ==
Title	Details	Peak chart positions				Sales	Certifications
Title	Details	US	US Country	AUS	CAN	Sales	Certifications
Justin Moore	Release date: August 11, 2009; Label: Valory Music Group; Formats: CD, music download	10	3	—	—	US: 550,000	RIAA: Platinum
Outlaws Like Me	Release date: June 21, 2011; Label: Valory Music Group; Formats: CD, music download	5	1	—	—	US: 577,000	RIAA: Platinum
Off the Beaten Path	Release date: September 17, 2013; Label: Valory Music Group; Formats: CD, music download	2	1	—	5	US: 364,000	RIAA: Gold
Kinda Don't Care	Release date: August 12, 2016; Label: Valory Music Group; Formats: CD, music download	4	1	61	15	US: 150,000	
Late Nights and Longnecks	Release date: July 26, 2019; Label: Valory Music Group; Formats: CD, music download	22	2	—	82	US: 50,000	
Straight Outta the Country	Release date: April 23, 2021; Label: Valory Music Group; Formats: music download	—	38	—	—		
Stray Dog	Release date: May 5, 2023; Label: Valory Music Group; Formats: CD, vinyl, music download	162	25	—	—		
This Is My Dirt	Release date: October 11, 2024; Label: Valory Music Group; Formats: CD, Music download	—	—	—	—		
"—" denotes releases that did not chart or was not released in that area

== Extended plays ==
Title	Details	Peak chart positions		
Title	Details	US	US Country	US Heat
The "You Asked for It" EP	Release date: June 9, 2009; Label: Valory Music Group; Formats: CD, music download	—	54	49
Point at You and Four Moore Hits EP	Release date: April 2, 2013; Label: Valory Music Group; Formats: CD, music download	172	28	—
"—" denotes releases that did not chart or was not released in that area

== Singles ==
=== As lead artist ===
Year	Title	Peak chart positions					Certifications (sales threshold)	Album
Year	Title	US	US Country Songs	US Country Airplay	CAN	CAN Country	Certifications (sales threshold)	Album
2008	"I Could Kick Your Ass"	—	—		—	—		Justin Moore
2008	"Back That Thing Up"	—	38		—	—		Justin Moore
2009	"Small Town USA"	44	1		—	—	RIAA: Gold	Justin Moore
2009	"Backwoods"	69	6		—	30	RIAA: Gold	Justin Moore
2010	"How I Got to Be This Way"	— (Note: "How I Got to Be This Way" did not enter the Billboard Hot 100 but peaked at number one on the Bubbling Under Hot 100 Singles chart.)	17		—	42		Justin Moore
2011	"If Heaven Wasn't So Far Away"	49	1		76	4	RIAA: 2× Platinum	Outlaws Like Me
2011	"Bait a Hook"	63	17		—	35	RIAA: Platinum	Outlaws Like Me
2012	"Til My Last Day"	51	7	1	76	8	RIAA: Gold	Outlaws Like Me
2013	"Point at You"	53	10	2	71	6	RIAA: Gold	Off the Beaten Path
2013	"Lettin' the Night Roll"	49	7	1	67	4	RIAA: Platinum	Off the Beaten Path
2014	"Home Sweet Home" (with Vince Neil)	—	28	30	—	—		Nashville Outlaws: A Tribute to Mötley Crüe
2014	"This Kind of Town"	—	50	44	—	—		Off the Beaten Path
2015	"You Look Like I Need a Drink"	79	12	1	—	1	RIAA: Platinum	Kinda Don't Care
2016	"Somebody Else Will"	59	9	1	—	5	RIAA: Gold	Kinda Don't Care
2017	"Kinda Don't Care"	— (Note: "Kinda Don't Care" did not enter the Billboard Hot 100 but peaked at number 23 on the Bubbling Under Hot 100 Singles chart.)	28	17	—	43	MC: Gold	Kinda Don't Care
2018	"The Ones That Didn't Make It Back Home"	46	7	1	—	46	RIAA: Platinum; MC: Gold	Late Nights and Longnecks
2019	"Why We Drink"	50	8	1	63	3	MC: Platinum	Late Nights and Longnecks
2020	"We Didn't Have Much"	41	7	1	67	5	RIAA: Platinum; MC: Gold	Straight Outta the Country
2021	"With a Woman You Love"	59	12	1	59	3	RIAA: Gold; MC: Gold	Stray Dog
2022	"You, Me, & Whiskey" (with Priscilla Block)	37	8	3	77	2	RIAA: Platinum; MC: Gold	Stray Dog
2023	"This Is My Dirt"	96	23	4	—	25		This Is My Dirt
2024	"Time's Ticking"	63	17	1	89	2		This Is My Dirt
"—" denotes releases that did not chart or was not released in that area

=== As featured artist ===
Year	Title	Peak chart positions					Certifications (sales threshold)	Album
Year	Title	US	US Country Songs	US Country Airplay	CAN	CAN Country	Certifications (sales threshold)	Album
2014	"Small Town Throwdown" (Brantley Gilbert featuring Justin Moore and Thomas Rhett)	67	13	8	97	24	RIAA: Gold	Just as I Am

== Other charted songs ==
Year	Title	Peak positions		Album
Year	Title	US Country Songs	US Country Airplay	Album
2012	"Run Rudolph Run"	—	58	The Country Christmas Collection
2013	"Off the Beaten Path"	44	—	Off the Beaten Path
"—" denotes releases that did not chart

== Music videos ==
Year	Title	Director
2008	"Back That Thing Up"	Wes Edwards
2009	"Small Town USA"	Chris Hicky
2009	"Backwoods"	Kristin Barlowe
2010	"How I Got to Be This Way"	Chris Hicky
2011	"If Heaven Wasn't So Far Away"	Peter Zavadil
2011	"This Is NRA Country"	Adam Taylor
2011	"Bait a Hook"	Unknown
2012	"'Til My Last Day" (live)	Justin Nolan Key
2012	"'Til My Last Day"	Peter Zavadil
2013	"Point at You"	Peter Zavadil
2013	"Lettin' the Night Roll"	Peter Zavadil
2014	"Home Sweet Home" (with Vince Neil)	Shane Drake
2014	"Small Town Throwdown" (with Brantley Gilbert and Thomas Rhett)	Shane Drake
2016	"You Look Like I Need a Drink"	Shane Drake
2017	"Somebody Else Will"	Shane Drake
2017	"Kinda Don't Care"	Cody Villalobos
2019	"The Ones That Didn't Make It Back Home"	Cody Villalobos
2020	"Why We Drink"	Cody Villalobos
