= Time's Ticking =

2024 single by Justin Moore featuring Dierks Bentley

Single by Justin Moore

from the album This Is My Dirt
- Released: November 11, 2024
- Genre: Country
- Length: 3:00
- Label: Big Machine
- Songwriters: Justin Moore; Jeremy Stover; Will Bundy; Randy Montana
- Producers: Jeremy Stover; Scott Borchetta

Justin Moore singles chronology
"This Is My Dirt" (2023)	"Time's Ticking" (2024)

Alternate cover
- Cover art of the original version featuring Dierks Bentley.

"Time's Ticking" is a song by American country music singer Justin Moore. Originally recorded as a duet with Dierks Bentley and included on his eighth studio album, This Is My Dirt (2024), a solo version was released on October 25, 2024, which was issued to country radio on November 11, 2024, as the album's second single. It was written by Moore, Jeremy Stover, Will Bundy and Randy Montana and produced by Stover and Scott Borchetta.

== Background ==
The song was created during a writing session at Justin Moore's Florida panhandle property on February 24, 2023. According to Moore, the song's message was: "Live life to the fullest, and try to take advantage of every moment you have, whether it be with your family or with your career. Make the most out of every single day." Jeremy Stover suggested the title of the song, inspired by the rapid passage of time during parenthood; he stated "My kids are getting a little older. And just thinking on some of the moments I've missed, but also some of the ones I've been there for — you know, the ones I've been there for have been really, really valuable, and I appreciate a lot. That's a big part of where that comes from."

Will Bundy started working with a "brisk train beat", giving the song an energetic feel. The writers developed the lyrical framework for the chorus, as well as the melody, keeping it generally in the same vocal range as the verses instead of lifting it as they typically did. The next day, they decided to involve a funeral procession in the song's story, as it would reasonably lead the protagonist to think about his own finality. They added lyrics about a long, black Cadillac (suggesting a hearse) in the first two lines.

After Bundy built out the demo, Moore performed the final vocal for the song in the kitchen, and joined Stover and Scott Borchetta at a later date for a tracking session at the Castle Recording Laboratory. Moore's road band contributed to the instrumental, with additional overdubs recorded at the Blackbird Studio.

Moore texted Dierks Bentley with a request to collaborate on the song, which Bentley agreed. Moore had felt that Bentley's rugged vocals would be the perfect addition. Though Bentley appeared on the album version, he was unable to participate in the single due to conflicts in his own release schedule, so the version that was released to radio only features Moore's solo performance.

== Composition and lyrics ==
The song is composed of acoustic guitar, banjo and a steel guitar with a "spiritual twang", while the intro contains a guitar lick of Will Bundy's signature style. A drum part is heavily filtered in the first verse, in which the narrator makes way for a passing funeral procession by pulling into a Kwik Sak parking lot. Watching the event causes him to realize that life is fleeting and he must appreciate the small things in life, including calling his mother, kissing his children and spending time with friends, as detailed in the chorus. The second verse describes him driving back onto the road with his new outlook.

== Chart performance ==
"Time's Ticking" topped the Billboard Country Airplay chart in its 67th week on April 11, 2026, which broke the record for the slowest climb to number one surpassing Travis Denning's "After a Few" and Michael Ray's "Whiskey and Rain", which each took 65 weeks to reach the top. It became Moore's 11th number one, and his first since "With a Woman You Love" in 2022.

== Charts ==
Weekly chart performance for "Time's Ticking"
Chart (2024–2026)	Peak position
Canada Hot 100 (Billboard)	89
Canada Country (Billboard)	2
US Billboard Hot 100	63
US Country Airplay (Billboard)	1
US Hot Country Songs (Billboard)	17
