= This Is My Dirt =

2023 single by Justin Moore

Single by Justin Moore

from the album This Is My Dirt
- Released: November 17, 2023
- Genre: Country
- Length: 3:37 (single version); 4:14 (album version)
- Label: Big Machine
- Songwriters: Justin Moore; Paul DiGiovanni; Randy Montana; Jeremy Stover
- Producers: Jeremy Stover; Scott Borchetta

Justin Moore singles chronology
"You, Me & Whiskey" (2023)	"This Is My Dirt" (2023)	"Time's Ticking" (2024)

"This Is My Dirt" is a song by American country music singer Justin Moore. It was released on November 17, 2023, as the lead single from his eighth studio album of the same name. The song was written by Moore, Paul DiGiovanni of Boys Like Girls, Randy Montana and Jeremy Stover, who also produced the song with Scott Borchetta.

== Background ==
According to Justin Moore:

"This Is My Dirt," is a song not only about how you grew up, but more specifically, where you grew up, and in particular, where I grew up. The land that I live on – and the land am raising my children on — is the same land that I grew up on. My mom was raised on this land, and it has been in our family since the late 1800s. My great, great grandfather raised my grandfather here. My grandpa inherited the land from him, and then I inherited it from my grandpa. So, it's really special to us, for obvious reasons. But, no matter where you grew up, I think everybody holds a special place in their heart for that place — whether it's a subdivision or thousands of acres. This song is about taking pride in wherever it is that you call "your dirt."

== Content ==
In the song, Moore sings about the hard work that his family has put into taking care of land which they have owned for generations and his refusal to sell the property.

== Critical reception ==
Billy Dukes of Taste of Country gave a positive review of the song, remarking "Defending what you've worked for is an American quality that's universal, and that makes this song from an upcoming project easy to find yourself in. That Moore sings the heck out of it certainly doesn't hurt his chances at scoring another No. 1 hit."

== Personnel ==
- Justin Moore – vocals
- Danny Rader – baritone guitar, octave mandolin, resonator guitar
- Roger Coleman – electric guitar
- Stephen LaPlante – electric guitar
- Mike Johnson – steel guitar
- Dave Dubas – bass
- Wil Houchens – keyboards
- Tucker Wilson – drums
- Paul DiGiovanni - programming
- Jason Kyle Saetviet – background vocals

== Charts ==
=== Weekly charts ===
Weekly chart performance for "This Is My Dirt"
Chart (2023–2024)	Peak position
Canada Country (Billboard)	25
US Billboard Hot 100	96
US Country Airplay (Billboard)	4
US Hot Country Songs (Billboard)	23

=== Year-end charts ===
2024 year-end chart performance for "This Is My Dirt"
Chart (2024)	Position
US Country Airplay (Billboard)	21
