= You, Me, & Whiskey =

Single by Justin Moore and Priscilla Block

from the album Stray Dog
- Released: October 7, 2022
- Genre: Country
- Length: 3:14
- Label: Big Machine
- Songwriters: Jessi Alexander; Brock Berryhill; Cole Taylor
- Producers: Jeremy Stover; Scott Borchetta

Justin Moore singles chronology
"With a Woman You Love" (2021)	"You, Me, & Whiskey" (2022)	"This Is My Dirt" (2023)

"You, Me, & Whiskey" is a song by American country music singers Justin Moore and Priscilla Block. It was released on October 7, 2022, as the second single from Moore's seventh studio album Stray Dog.

== History ==
Jessi Alexander wrote "You, Me, & Whiskey" with Brock Berryhill and Cole Taylor. Lyrically, it is about drinking whiskey with a loved one.

When seeking material for his seventh studio album Stray Dog, Moore was not originally intending to include a duet. When touring with Priscilla Block, he spoke favorably of her artistry and asked if she wanted to sing a duet with him, and she agreed. The two singers also filmed a music video directed by Cody Villalobos, which intersperses footage of Moore and Block with footage of a man and woman having a sexual encounter.

== Charts ==
=== Weekly charts ===
Weekly chart performance
Chart (2022–2023)	Peak position
Canada Hot 100 (Billboard)	77
Canada Country (Billboard)	2
US Billboard Hot 100	37
US Country Airplay (Billboard)	3
US Hot Country Songs (Billboard)	8

=== Year-end charts ===
Year-end chart performance
Chart (2023)	Position
US Country Airplay (Billboard)	20
US Hot Country Songs (Billboard)	33
US Radio Songs (Billboard)	65

== Certifications ==
Certifications for "You, Me, & Whiskey"
Region	Certification	Certified units/sales
Canada (Music Canada)	Gold	40,000^{‡}
United States (RIAA)	Platinum	1,000,000^{‡}
^{‡} Sales+streaming figures based on certification alone.
