= Stray Dog (Justin Moore album) =

2023 album by Justin Moore

Studio album by Justin Moore
- Released: May 5, 2023
- Genre: Country
- Length: 27:38
- Label: Valory
- Producer: Jeremy Stover, Scott Borchetta

Justin Moore chronology
Straight Outta the Country (2021)	Stray Dog (2023)	This Is My Dirt (2024)

Singles from Stray Dog
- 1. "With a Woman You Love" Released: October 1, 2021; 2. "You, Me, & Whiskey" Released: October 7, 2022

Stray Dog is the seventh studio album by American country music singer Justin Moore. It was released on May 5, 2023 via Valory Music, an imprint of Big Machine Records. The album includes the singles "With a Woman You Love" and "You, Me, & Whiskey".

== Content ==
Prior to the album's release, the lead single "With a Woman You Love" went to number one on Country Airplay. The album includes eight songs, of which two are duets: "Everybody Get Along" with Riley Green and "You, Me, & Whiskey" with Priscilla Block, the latter of which is the second single. Moore told the blog Country Now that he wanted to find the "best" songs to put on the album. As with all of his previous albums, Jeremy Stover is the producer.

== Critical reception ==
An uncredited review Washington, Pennsylvania, Observer-Reporter described the album as "no-nonsense" and stated that Moore "stays close to his country roots with an album overflowing with plenty of swagger and honest emotion."

== Track listing ==
No.	Title	Writer(s)	Length
1.	"Everybody Get Along" (featuring Riley Green)	Justin Moore, David Lee Murphy, Jeremy Stover	3:12
2.	"That Wasn't Jack"	Moore, Murphy, Stover, Chris Stevens	3:14
3.	"With a Woman You Love"	Moore, Stover, Chase McGill, Paul DiGiovanni	2:48
4.	"Better Slow"	Moore, Stover, DiGiovanni, Randy Montana	3:17
5.	"Stray Dogs"	Moore, Stover, DiGiovanni, Montana	3:41
6.	"Country on It"	Moore, Stover, DiGiovanni, Casey Beathard	2:57
7.	"You, Me, & Whiskey" (featuring Priscilla Block)	Jessi Alexander, Brock Berryhill, Cole Taylor	3:08
8.	"Get Rich or Drunk Trying"	Moore, Stover, DiGiovanni, Beathard	5:21

== Chart performance ==
Chart (2023)	Peak position
US Billboard 200	162
US Top Country Albums (Billboard)	25
