= We Didn't Have Much =

2021 song by Justin Moore

Single by Justin Moore

from the album Straight Outta the Country
- Released: October 9, 2020
- Genre: Country
- Length: 2:54
- Label: Valory Music Co.
- Songwriters: Randy Montana; Jeremy Stover; Paul DiGiovanni
- Producers: Jeremy Stover; Scott Borchetta

Justin Moore singles chronology
"Why We Drink" (2019)	"We Didn't Have Much" (2020)	"With a Woman You Love" (2021)

"We Didn't Have Much" is a song recorded by American country music singer Justin Moore. It was released on October 9, 2020 as the lead single from his sixth studio album Straight Outta the Country. The song was written by Randy Montana, Paul DiGiovanni and Jeremy Stover, who also produced it with Scott Borchetta.

== Background ==
Moore said in a statement: "I think it's a poignant lyric for this time in our lives also. 2020 has led my family and I to lead a more simple life than what we are accustomed to", remarking on the beauty in that simplicity.

== Content ==
Chris Parton of website Sounds Like Nashville referred to the song as talking his life since COVID-19 pandemic, Moore also said: "And I think this song is very very poignant if that were to apply to your life as well. Not concerned with certain things that sometimes we get wrapped up in on a day-to-day basis, and now going and borrowing eggs and flour and stuff from your neighbors and all that good stuff that we maybe had gotten away from. I know myself and my family had done that throughout this time. I think this song is very time sensitive in that regard."

== Charts ==
=== Weekly charts ===
Weekly chart performance for "We Didn't Have Much"
Chart (2020–2021)	Peak position
Canada Hot 100 (Billboard)	67
Canada Country (Billboard)	5
US Billboard Hot 100	41
US Country Airplay (Billboard)	1
US Hot Country Songs (Billboard)	7

=== Year-end charts ===
Year-end chart performance for "We Didn't Have Much"
Chart (2021)	Position
US Country Airplay (Billboard)	10
US Hot Country Songs (Billboard)	39

== Certifications ==
Certifications for "We Didn't Have Much"
Region	Certification	Certified units/sales
Canada (Music Canada)	Gold	40,000^{‡}
United States (RIAA)	Platinum	1,000,000^{‡}
^{‡} Sales+streaming figures based on certification alone.
