= Kinda Don't Care =

Studio album by Justin Moore
- Released: August 12, 2016
- Genre: Country
- Length: 40:37 (Standard Edition); 54:39 (Deluxe Edition)
- Label: Valory Music Group
- Producer: Jeremy Stover; Scott Borchetta; Julian Raymond

Justin Moore chronology
Off the Beaten Path (2013)	Kinda Don't Care (2016)	Late Nights and Longnecks (2019)

Singles from Kinda Don't Care
- 1. "You Look Like I Need a Drink" Released: November 17, 2015; 2. "Somebody Else Will" Released: October 17, 2016; 3. "Kinda Don't Care" Released: September 18, 2017

Kinda Don't Care is the fourth studio album by American country music artist Justin Moore. It was released on August 12, 2016 via Valory Music Group, an imprint of Big Machine Records. The album's lead single is "You Look Like I Need a Drink". The album's second single is "Somebody Else Will" released on October 17, 2016. The album's third single, its title track, was released on September 18, 2017.

== Content ==
Moore told Rolling Stone that "Naming the album Kinda Don’t Care is not meant to be nonchalant or careless. It's meant to be a challenge to folks to live life a little more freely and be true to themselves." The album consists of 12 tracks, with four more on a deluxe version. Among the songs are the lead single "You Look Like I Need a Drink", and a duet with Brantley Gilbert on "More Middle Fingers". The track "Hell on a Highway" was originally on hold for Luke Bryan, but Moore contacted Bryan, who gave him permission to record it instead.

== Reception ==
=== Critical ===
Giving it 4 out of 5 stars, AllMusic's Stephen Thomas Erlewine wrote that it "slyly threads in pieces of the R&B-inflected country that dominated the airwaves" and that the album's style "doesn't sound like pandering: it feels like an outgrowth of his ballad side". In 2017, Billboard contributor Chuck Dauphin placed two tracks from the album on his top 10 list of Moore's best songs: "You Look Like I Need a Drink" at number two and "Somebody Else Will" at number nine.

=== Commercial ===
The album debuted at No. 4 on the Billboard 200 based on 42,000 units, 37,000 of which are pure album sales. It also topped the Country Albums chart, which is Moore's third consecutive No. 1 on the chart. It has sold 134,800 copies in the US as of November 2017.

== Track listing ==
No.	Title	Writer(s)	Length
1.	"Robbin' Trains"	Brett Beavers; Deric Ruttan; Josh Thompson	3:25
2.	"Put Me in a Box"	Erik Dylan; Randy Montana	2:44
3.	"Kinda Don't Care"	Rhett Akins; Ross Copperman; Ben Hayslip	4:21
4.	"Hell on a Highway"	Blake Bollinger; Matt Rogers; Ben Stennis	4:20
5.	"Goodbye Back"	Justin Moore; Copperman; Jeremy Stover	3:13
6.	"You Look Like I Need a Drink"	Rodney Clawson; Matt Dragstrem; Natalie Hemby	3:07
7.	"Somebody Else Will"	Kelly Archer; Adam Hambrick; Tebey Ottoh	2:45
8.	"Between You and Me"	Smith Ahnquist; Pavel Dovgaluk; C.J. Solar	3:00
9.	"Got It Good"	Jaren Johnston; Neil Mason; Stover	2:43
10.	"Rebel Kids"	Dan Isbell; Montana	3:56
11.	"More Middle Fingers" (duet with Brantley Gilbert)	Casey Beathard; Monty Criswell; Shane Minor	3:55
12.	"Life in the Livin'"	Travis Denning; Jared Mullins; Chris Stevens	3:08
Total length:			40:37

Deluxe edition
No.	Title	Writer(s)	Length
13.	"Middle Class Money"	Akins; Marv Green; Hayslip	3:42
14.	"Pick Up Lines"	Corey Crowder; Travis Denning; Mullins	3:21
15.	"Spendin' the Night"	Archer; Andrew DeRoberts; Hambrick	3:16
16.	"When I Get Home"	Justin Moore; Dean Dillon; Stover	3:39
Total length:			54:39

== Chart performance ==
=== Weekly charts ===
Chart (2016)	Peak position
Australian Albums (ARIA)	61
Canadian Albums (Billboard)	15
New Zealand Heatseekers Albums (RMNZ)	10
US Billboard 200	4
US Top Country Albums (Billboard)	1

=== Year-end charts ===
Chart (2016)	Position
US Top Country Albums (Billboard)	31

=== Singles ===
Year	Single	Peak chart positions				
Year	Single	US Country	US Country Airplay	US	CAN Country	CAN
2015	"You Look Like I Need a Drink"	12	1	79	1	—
2016	"Somebody Else Will"	9	1	59	—	—
2017	"Kinda Don't Care"	28	17			
