= This Kind of Town =

Single by Justin Moore

from the album Off the Beaten Path
- Released: October 20, 2014
- Genre: Country
- Length: 3:51
- Label: Valory Music Group
- Songwriter(s): Andrew Dorff; Chris Tompkins
- Producer(s): Jeremy Stover

Justin Moore singles chronology
"Home Sweet Home" (2014)	"This Kind of Town" (2014)	"You Look Like I Need a Drink" (2015)

"This Kind of Town" is a song written by Andrew Dorff and Chris Tompkins and recorded by American country music artist Justin Moore. It was released on October 20, 2014, as the third single from Moore's 2013 album, Off the Beaten Path.

== Critical reception ==
Website Taste of Country gave the song a positive review, saying that "[the] ballad reminisces about the hallmarks of 'Small Town USA'. Blue collars, Friday night football, Sunday morning church … If Rockwell was a country singer, he’d write this kind of song."

== Chart performance ==
The song peaked at number 44 on the US Billboard Country Airplay chart and at number 50 on Hot Country Songs, becoming Moore's lowest peaking single since "Back That Thing Up", his debut single, peaked at number 38 in 2008.

Chart (2014–15)	Peak position
US Country Airplay (Billboard)	44
US Hot Country Songs (Billboard)	50
