= Why We Drink =

Single by Justin Moore

from the album Late Nights and Longnecks
- Released: September 30, 2019
- Genre: Country
- Length: 3:35
- Label: Valory Music Co.
- Songwriters: Justin Moore; Casey Beathard; David Lee Murphy; Jeremy Stover
- Producers: Jeremy Stover; Scott Borchetta

Justin Moore singles chronology
"The Ones That Didn't Make It Back Home" (2019)	"Why We Drink" (2019)	"We Didn't Have Much" (2020)

"Why We Drink" is a song recorded by American country music singer Justin Moore. It is the second single from his fifth studio album, 2019's Late Nights and Longnecks. Moore co-wrote the song with David Lee Murphy, Casey Beathard, and Jeremy Stover, who also produced it.

== Content ==
The song is a list of reasons that one may give to consume alcoholic beverages. According to Moore, the idea for the song came when at a bar with his mother. She asked him "why do you drink so much?" and he responded that he had never found a reason not to drink. Moore then presented the idea to Jeremy Stover, his record producer, who helped him write the song with David Lee Murphy and Casey Beathard.

== Music video ==
Cody Villalobos directed the song's music video, which was shot in Moore's hometown of Poyen, Arkansas. Moore's mother also appears in the video, which features him participating in recreational activities such as riding horses and drinking around a bonfire.

== Chart performance ==
=== Weekly charts ===
Chart (2019–2020)	Peak position
Canada Hot 100 (Billboard)	63
Canada Country (Billboard)	3
US Billboard Hot 100	50
US Country Airplay (Billboard)	1
US Hot Country Songs (Billboard)	8

=== Year-end charts ===
Chart (2020)	Position
US Country Airplay (Billboard)	16
US Hot Country Songs (Billboard)	37

== Certifications ==
Region	Certification	Certified units/sales
Canada (Music Canada)	Platinum	80,000^{‡}
^{‡} Sales+streaming figures based on certification alone.
