= This Is My Dirt (album) =

Studio album by Justin Moore
- Released: October 11, 2024
- Genre: Country
- Length: 38:33
- Label: Valory
- Producer: Scott Borchetta; Jeremy Stover; Paul DiGiovanni

Justin Moore chronology
Stray Dog (2023)	This Is My Dirt (2024)

Singles from This Is My Dirt
- 1. "This Is My Dirt" Released: November 17, 2023; 2. "Time's Ticking" Released: November 11, 2024

This Is My Dirt is the eighth studio album by American country music singer Justin Moore. It was released through Valory on October 11, 2024. Its title track and "Time's Ticking" were released as singles.

== Content ==
Moore co-wrote all 12 tracks on This Is My Dirt, and it was produced by longtime collaborators Scott Borchetta and Jeremy Stover. It marks the first record Moore has utilized his band instead of studio musicians, and the album features collaborations with Randy Houser, Blake Shelton, and Dierks Bentley.

== Singles ==
The album's title track was released as the lead single on November 17, 2023. It reached a peak of number 4 on the Billboard Country Airplay chart. "Time's Ticking" was released on November 11, 2024, as the album's second single. Originally a collaboration with Dierks Bentley, a solo version was issued for the radio release.

== Track listing ==
All tracks are written by Justin Moore and Jeremy Stover, with additional co-writers noted. All songs produced by Scott Borchetta and Jeremy Stover except "The Getting By", which was co-produced by Paul DiGiovanni and Stover.

This Is My Dirt track listing
No.	Title	Writer(s)	Length
1.	"This Is My Dirt" (Album Edit)	Paul DiGiovanni; Randy Montana	4:14
2.	"Put a Boot in It"	Will Bundy; Montana	3:00
3.	"The Worst" (featuring Randy Houser)	Chase McGill	3:21
4.	"Glad to Be Here"	DiGiovanni; Montana	2:37
5.	"Love Your Hometown"	Bundy; Montana	3:30
6.	"Beer Ain't One" (featuring Blake Shelton)	Casey Beathard; Bundy; Joe London	2:51
7.	"The Getting By"	DiGiovanni; Montana	3:16
8.	"Redneck Love"	Bundy; DiGiovanni; Montana	2:56
9.	"Time's Ticking" (featuring Dierks Bentley)	Bundy; Montana	3:00
10.	"F Word"	DiGiovanni; McGill	2:44
11.	"Never Left Me"	Beathard; Bundy	3:33
12.	"You Know It's Coming"	McGill	3:25
Total length:			38:33

== Personnel ==
Musicians

- Justin Moore – lead vocals
- Randy Houser – featured vocals (track 3)
- Dierks Bentley – featured vocals (track 9)
- Blake Shelton – featured vocals (track 6)
- Danny Rader – acoustic guitar (tracks 2–5, 8–12), banjo guitar (6, 8, 9), baritone guitar (1), electric guitar (12), high-strung guitar (2, 6, 10), octave mandolin (1, 12), resonator guitar (1, 4)
- Roger Coleman – electric guitar (tracks 1–6, 8–12)
- Paul DiGiovanni - acoustic guitar (track 7), electric guitar (7), programming (1, 7)
- Stephen LaPlante – electric guitar (tracks 1–6, 8–12)
- Mike Johnson – steel guitar (tracks 1–5, 8–10, 12)
- Justin Schipper – steel guitar (track 7)
- Dave Dubas – bass (tracks 1–6, 8–12)
- Wil Houchens – keyboards (tracks 1–6, 8–12)
- Tucker Wilson – drums (tracks 1–6, 8–12)
- Jason Kyle Saetviet – background vocals (tracks 1–6, 8–12)

Technical

- Julian King – recording engineer
- Zach Kuhlman – engineering assistance (tracks 1–6, 8–12)
- Jason Kyle Saetviet – recording engineer (tracks 1–6, 8–12)
- Jim Cooley – mixing
- Ted Jensen – mastering
- Jason Campbell – production coordination

Imagery

- Cody Villalobos – photographer
- Sandi Spika Borchetta and Justin Ford – art direction
- Becky Reiser – graphic design
