= Straight Outta the Country =

Studio album by Justin Moore
- Released: April 23, 2021
- Genre: Country
- Label: Valory
- Producers: Jeremy Stover; Paul DiGiovanni; Scott Borchetta

Justin Moore chronology
Late Nights and Longnecks (2019)	Straight Outta the Country (2021)	Stray Dog (2023)

Singles from Straight Outta The Country
- 1. "We Didn't Have Much" Released: October 9, 2020

Straight Outta the Country is the sixth studio album by American country music singer Justin Moore. It was released April 23, 2021 via Big Machine Records' Valory Music Group imprint. The album includes the single "We Didn't Have Much", a number one single on the Billboard Country Airplay charts that year.

== Content ==
Of the album's eight songs, Moore co-wrote two. The project's lead single is "We Didn't Have Much", co-written by the album's producer, Jeremy Stover. Also producing were Paul DiGiovanni and Scott Borchetta.

== Critical reception ==
Michael Rampa of Country Standard Time reviewed the album favorably, saying that Moore "plays the role of country music's champion of the everyman". He also described the songs' melodies and production positively.

== Track listing ==
No.	Title	Writer(s)	Length
1.	"Hearing Things"	Rhett Akins, Kelly Archer, Chris Stevens	2:55
2.	"Consecutive Days Alive"	Casey Beathard, Monty Criswell, Jeremy Stover	3:30
3.	"We Didn’t Have Much"	Paul DiGiovanni, Randy Montana, Stover	2:54
4.	"She Ain’t Mine No More"	Justin Moore, DiGiovanni, Jamie Paulin, Stover	3:37
5.	"More Than Me"	Moore, DiGiovanni, Chase McGill, Stover	2:53
6.	"Straight Outta the Country"	Michael Hardy, Cam Montgomery, Josh Thompson	2:48
7.	"You Keep Getting Me Drunk"	Akins, Archer, DiGiovanni	3:01
8.	"We Didn’t Have Much (Acoustic Version)"	DiGiovanni, Montana, Stover	3:01

== Personnel ==
Adapted from liner notes.

- Sarah Buxton - background vocals
- Roger Coleman - acoustic guitar, background vocals
- Josh Cross - acoustic guitar, background vocals
- Paul DiGiovanni - acoustic guitar, electric guitar, keyboards, programming, background vocals
- Paul Franklin - steel guitar
- Evan Hutchings - drums
- Mike Johnson - steel guitar
- Brent Mason - electric guitar
- Justin Moore - lead vocals
- Jason Kyle Saetveit - background vocals
- Jimmie Lee Sloas - bass guitar
- Chris Stevens - keyboards, programming
- Ilya Toshinsky - acoustic guitar
- Derek Wells - electric guitar

== Chart performance ==
=== Weekly charts ===
Chart (2021)	Peak position
US Top Country Albums (Billboard)	38
