= Justin Moore =

American country singer and songwriter (born 1984)

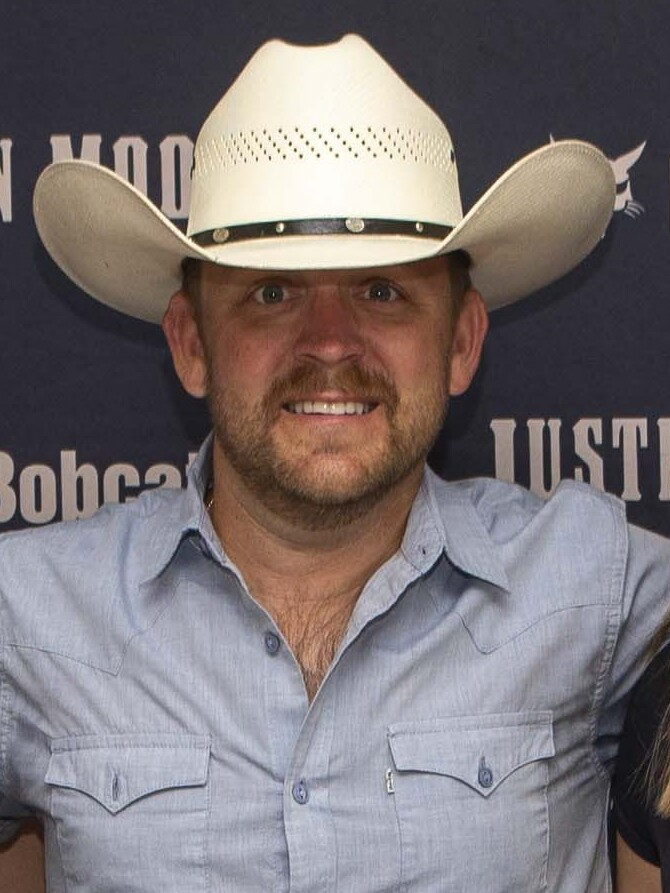
- Moore in 2023

Background information
- Born: Justin Cole Moore; March 30, 1984 (age 42); Poyen, Arkansas, U.S.
- Genres: Country
- Occupations: Singer; songwriter
- Instruments: Vocals; guitar
- Years active: 2008–present
- Label: Valory Music Group
- Website: justinmooremusic.com

Justin Cole Moore (born March 30, 1984) is an American country music singer and songwriter, signed to Big Machine Records imprint Valory Music Group. For that label, he has released seven studio albums: his self titled debut in 2009, Outlaws Like Me in 2011, Off the Beaten Path in 2013, Kinda Don't Care in 2016, Late Nights and Longnecks in 2019, Straight Outta the Country in 2021, and Stray Dog in 2023. His songs have also charted twenty-one times on the US Billboard Hot Country Songs and Country Airplay charts, including number-one singles "Small Town USA", "If Heaven Wasn't So Far Away", "Til My Last Day", "Lettin' the Night Roll", "You Look Like I Need a Drink", "Somebody Else Will", "The Ones That Didn't Make It Back Home", "Why We Drink", "We Didn't Have Much", "With a Woman You Love", and "Time's Ticking"; and the top-10 hits "Backwoods", "Point at You", "You, Me, & Whiskey", and "This Is My Dirt".

Moore is also a radio personality on the statewide talk radio show Morning Mayhem on 103.7 The Buzz, a sports station in Little Rock, Arkansas.

== Music career ==
Moore began performing during his junior year of high school. After graduating, he joined his uncle's Southern rock band and moved to Nashville, Tennessee, in 2002. He met a young producer in Nashville, Jeremy Stover, who introduced him to Scott Borchetta, an industry executive who was planning to launch The Valory Music Co. Borchetta promised to give him a record deal if he would be patient.

=== 2008–2010: Justin Moore ===
In mid-2008, Moore signed to the Valory Music Group, an imprint of the independent record label Big Machine Records. The label then released the digital single "I Could Kick Your Ass". His first radio single, "Back That Thing Up", was co-written by Randy Houser and Moore's producer, Jeremy Stover. It reached number 38 on the US Billboard Hot Country Songs chart. He continued working on his debut album, which was part of a special promotion called "So You Want to Be a Record Label Executive". This promotion placed his music on social networking sites such as MySpace and iLike, where fans were allowed to create playlists comprising ten of his songs; the top 10 songs picked were then included on the final album. His next single, "Small Town USA". entered the charts in February 2009, followed by a digital EP titled The "You Asked for It" EP.

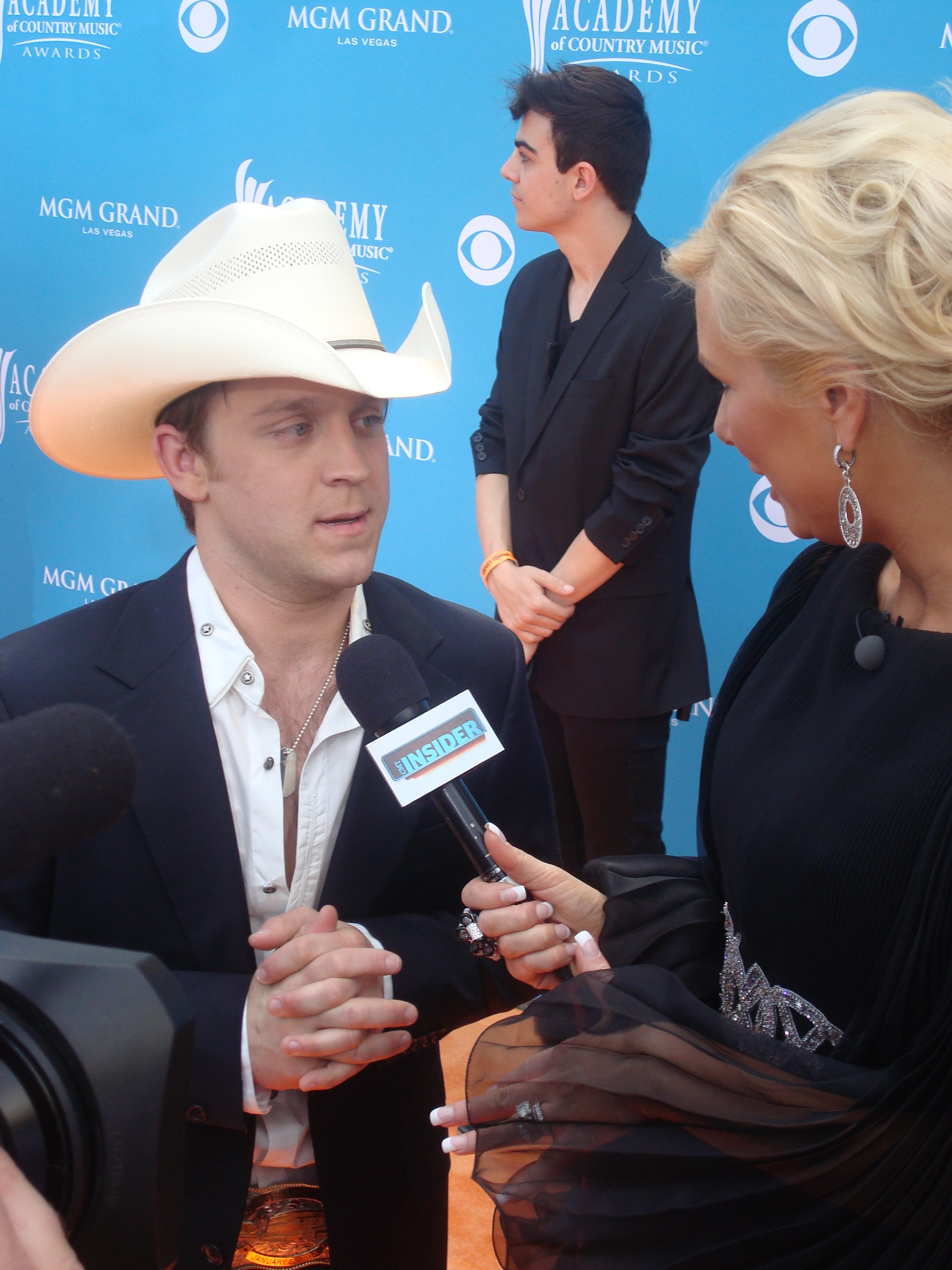
Justin Moore at the ACM Awards in 2010

On August 11, the label released his self-titled debut album, on which he co-wrote nine of the ten tracks. This album debuted at number 3 on the Top Country Albums chart. He promoted the single and album on a "Small Town USA" tour which began in his hometown of Poyen, Arkansas, and included several stops in small towns, as well as acoustic shows at Walmart stores. On the Hot Country Songs charts dated October 3, 2009, "Small Town USA" became his first number 1 single. "Backwoods" was released as the album's third single in October 2009. It became his second top 10 hit with a peak of number 6 in April 2010. The album's fourth single, "How I Got to Be This Way". reached the top 20.

=== 2011–2014: Outlaws Like Me and Off the Beaten Path ===
In February 2011, he released the song "If Heaven Wasn't So Far Away", which was originally recorded by Rhett Akins on his 2007 album People Like Me but did not chart. Justin Moore's rendition debuted at 46 on the Hot Country songs chart. In June 2011, the song became his third Top 10 hit on that chart and three weeks later, it became his second Number One. The song serves as the lead-off single to his 2011 album Outlaws Like Me, which was released on June 21, 2011. Follow-up singles "Bait a Hook" and "Til My Last Day" both broke the Top 20; the latter reached Number One on the Country Airplay chart.

In December 2012, Moore announced plans to embark on a headlining tour in 2013, at the time tentatively planned to begin in March. Later in the month, he entered the studio to begin recording his third studio album. The album's first single, "Point at You", was released on March 18, 2013. It peaked at number 2 on the Country Airplay chart in October 2013. The album, entitled Off the Beaten Path, was released on September 17, 2013. The album's second single, "Lettin' the Night Roll", was released on October 21, 2013, and became his fourth number one single on the Country Airplay chart in July 2014.

After that single's release, Moore sang guest vocals along with Thomas Rhett on Brantley Gilbert's 2014 single "Small Town Throwdown". Just like Moore himself, Rhett and Gilbert are also signed to Valory. Later, he recorded a cover of Mötley Crüe's "Home Sweet Home" as a duet with the band's lead singer Vince Neil. This song is featured on the multi-artist tribute album Nashville Outlaws: A Tribute to Mötley Crüe, which was released by Big Machine on August 19, 2014. A third single from Off the Beaten Path, "This Kind of Town", was released on October 20, 2014.

=== 2015–2020: Kinda Don't Care and Late Nights and Longnecks ===
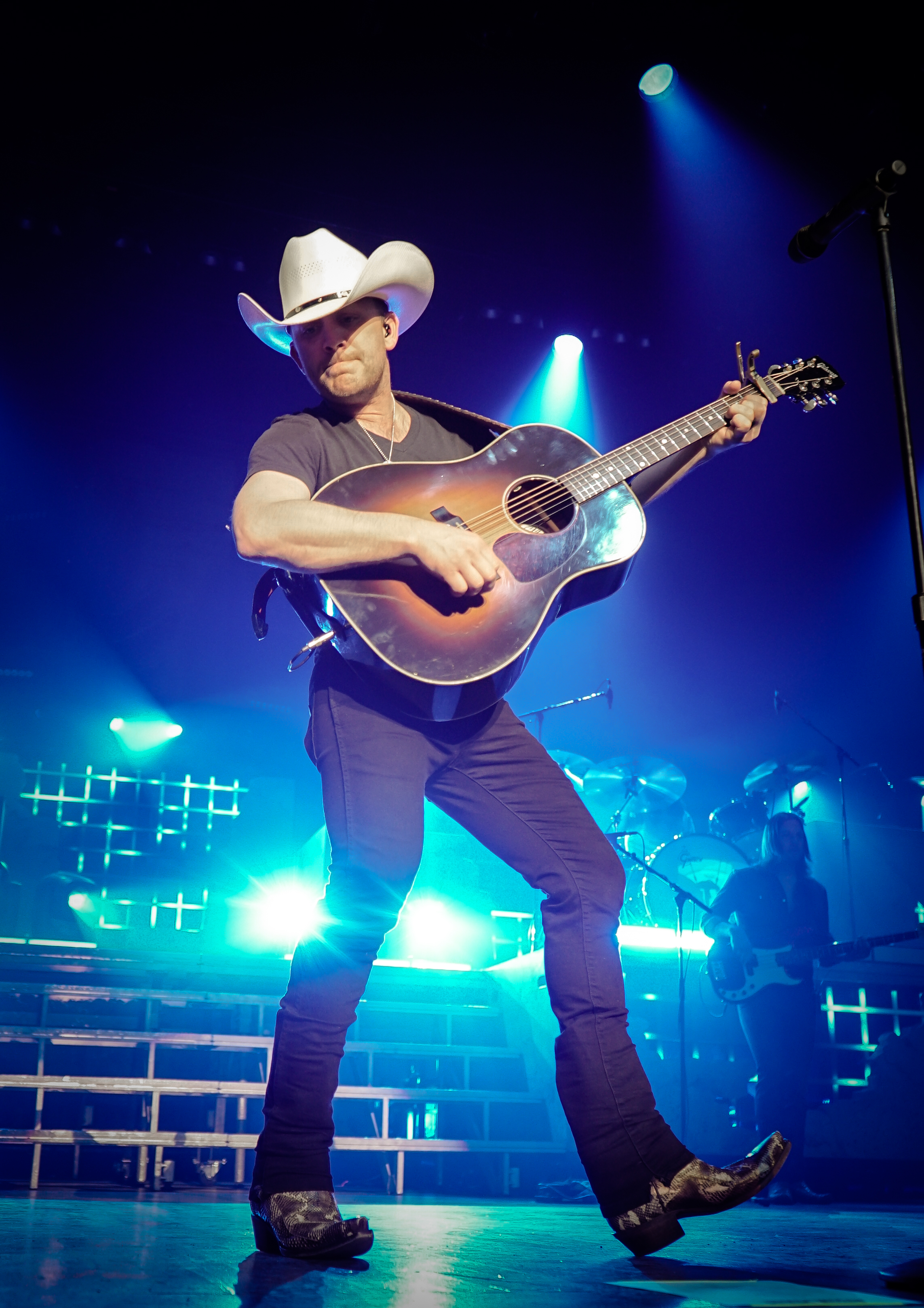
Moore performing live in 2018

Moore's fourth album, Kinda Don't Care, was released in August 2016. Its lead single is "You Look Like I Need a Drink", which became another No. 1 single on the Country Airplay charts in late 2016. In October 2016, the second single from the album, "Somebody Else Will" was released. It became Moore's sixth number 1 hit on the Country Airplay charts. On September 18, 2017, the title track was released as the third and final single. The album includes Moore's second collaboration with Brantley Gilbert, following "Small Town Throwdown", titled "More Middle Fingers". Kinda Don't Care reached number 1 on the U.S. Top Country Albums chart and peaked at number 4 on the U.S. Billboard 200.

Moore announced his fifth album, Late Nights and Longnecks, in February 2019. Its lead single is "The Ones That Didn't Make It Back Home", which became Moore's seventh number 1 on the Country Airplay chart. Its second single, "Why We Drink", was released to radio on September 30, 2019. It became Moore's eighth number 1 on the Country Airplay charts. Late Nights and Longnecks debuted at number 2 on the US Top Country Albums chart. A deluxe edition was released, containing three additional songs.

=== 2021–2023: Straight Outta the Country and Stray Dog ===
Moore announced his sixth album Straight Outta the Country on March 25, 2021. The lead single is "We Didn't Have Much", which became Moore's ninth number 1 on the Country Airplay charts. The album was released on April 23. The album peaked at number 28 on the Top Country Albums chart.

On February 23, 2023, Moore announced his seventh album Stray Dog, which was released on May 5, 2023. The album's lead single, "With A Woman You Love" was released on October 1, 2021. It would become Moore's tenth No. 1 hit on the Country Airplay charts. The second single, "You, Me, & Whiskey", a duet with Priscilla Block, was released a year later on October 7, 2022. It peaked at number 3 on the Country Airplay chart, and number 2 on the Canada Country chart.

=== 2023–present: This Is My Dirt ===
On November 17, 2023, Moore released "This Is My Dirt" as the lead single from his upcoming eighth studio album. The first promotional single, "Put a Boot in It", was released in July 2024. On August 16, 2024, Moore announced his eighth studio album, This Is My Dirt, which was released on October 11, alongside the second promotional single, "The Worst", featuring Randy Houser. In August 2024, Moore was featured on the song "Dirty Money", the third promotional single from Brantley Gilbert's seventh studio album, Tattoos. This is the third collaboration between Moore and Gilbert, following "Small Town Throwdown" and "More Middle Fingers".

== Awards and nominations ==
Year	Association	Category	Result
2011	Inspirational Country Music Awards	Mainstream Inspirational Country Song - "If Heaven Wasn't So Far Away"	Won
2011	Inspirational Country Music Awards	Inspirational Video - "If Heaven Wasn't So Far Away"	Won
2012	American Country Awards	Artist of the Year: Breakthrough Artist	Nominated
2014	Academy of Country Music Awards	New Artist of the Year	Won

== Musical styles ==
Steve Leggett of AllMusic describes him as having "a ready-made image. He was that good kid from a small town with a rowdy heart of gold who just happened to be able to sing about it." He has said that he learned to write songs because, when he had first moved to Nashville, no songwriters wanted to offer him material. His first album received mixed reviews from music critics. Stephen Thomas Erlewine of Allmusic referred to it as "anonymous country rock", and Jeffrey B. Remz of Country Standard Time referred to Moore as a "poseur" for name-dropping. Engine 145's Karlie Justus said that his influences were comparatively more authentic than most other acts on country radio, and Matt Bjorke of Roughstock said that his music has "a heavy dose of southern, country charm and twang".

== Personal life ==
Justin Moore married his wife Kate of Houma, Louisiana, in 2007. They have three daughters and a son together. He is an avid supporter of the Arkansas Razorbacks.

Moore is a supporter of the Republican Party. In 2016, he endorsed Donald Trump in the presidential election, praising him as an "out of the box" candidate.

== Discography ==
Studio albums

- Justin Moore (2009)
- Outlaws Like Me (2011)
- Off the Beaten Path (2013)
- Kinda Don't Care (2016)
- Late Nights and Longnecks (2019)
- Straight Outta the Country (2021)
- Stray Dog (2023)
- This Is My Dirt (2024)
