= Small Town USA =

Single by Justin Moore

from the album Justin Moore
- Released: February 10, 2009
- Genre: Country
- Length: 3:38
- Label: Valory Music Group
- Songwriters: Brian Dean Maher; Justin Moore; Jeremy Stover
- Producer: Jeremy Stover

Justin Moore singles chronology
"Back That Thing Up" (2008)	"Small Town USA" (2009)	"Backwoods" (2009)

"Small Town USA" is a song co-written and recorded by American country music singer Justin Moore. It was released in February 2009 as the second single of his career and the second one from his self-titled debut album. On the charts dated for October 3, 2009, the song became Moore's first Number One hit. Just missing the Top 40 on the Billboard Hot 100, it peaked at number 44.

== Content ==
Co-written by Moore with Brian Dean Maher and Jeremy Stover, the song is a mid-tempo backed primarily by acoustic guitar and electric guitar, with piano flourishes. In it, the narrator lists off the various things in his hometown, and says that he proud of his roots. According to Moore, "Small Town USA" was the "first or second" song he wrote upon moving to Nashville, Tennessee. The song was inspired by his feeling homesick for Poyen, Arkansas.

The second line changes with every chorus (Hank Williams, Jr. in the first chorus, David Allan Coe in the second chorus [which has been altered by some radio stations with their own call letters], and "Sweet Home Alabama" after the bridge).

== Critical reception ==
Dan Milliken of Country Universe gave the song a D+ grade, saying that it was "written solely to appeal to a demographic of people who also live in small towns and can relate to surface-level ideas […] Without further development, the ideas just sound really, really clichéd." Karlie Justus of Engine 145 gave it a "thumbs down" review, criticizing the lyrics for lacking details that were specific to a rural lifestyle. Justus also said that the song "finds Moore a much stronger singer than a songwriter," comparing his vocals to those of Jason Aldean and Ronnie Dunn, and saying that his delivery has a “sense of authenticity.”

== Music video ==
A music video was filmed for the song in February 2009, and aired on CMT Pure Country and GAC that same month. Directed by Chris Hicky, it portrays Moore singing and playing guitar in various parts of his hometown of Poyen, Arkansas. The promo features several generations of Moore's family.

== Chart performance ==
"Small Town USA" debuted at number 55 on the Billboard Hot Country Songs chart for the chart week of February 21, 2009. The song then entered the Top 40 of the country charts in its eleventh chart week for the chart week of May 2, 2009. It has since become Moore's first Number One hit.

Chart (2009)	Peak position
US Billboard Hot 100	44
US Hot Country Songs (Billboard)	1

=== Year-end charts ===
Annual chart rankings
Chart (2009)	Position
US Country Songs (Billboard)	11
US Radio Songs (Billboard)	97

== Certifications ==
Region	Certification
United States (RIAA)	Gold
