= Point at You =

Single by Justin Moore

from the album Off the Beaten Path
- Released: March 18, 2013
- Recorded: 2013
- Genre: Country
- Length: 3:00
- Label: Valory Music Group
- Songwriters: Ross Copperman; Rhett Akins; Ben Hayslip
- Producer: Jeremy Stover

Justin Moore singles chronology
"Til My Last Day" (2012)	"Point at You" (2013)	"Lettin' the Night Roll" (2013)

"Point at You" is a song written by Ross Copperman, Rhett Akins and Ben Hayslip and recorded by American country music artist Justin Moore. It was released in March 2013 as the first single from his third studio album, Off the Beaten Path (2013). The song received positive reviews from critics lauding the production and lyrical dexterity. "Point at You" charted at numbers two and 10 on both the Billboard Country Airplay and Hot Country Songs charts respectively. It also appeared on the Hot 100, peaking at number 53. The song was certified Gold by the Recording Industry Association of America (RIAA), denoting sales of over 500,000 units in that country. It received similar chart success in Canada, peaking at number six on the Country chart and number 71 on the Canadian Hot 100. The accompanying music video for the song was directed by Peter Zavadil, and is about a man who gets into dangerous situations and sent to jail only for his girlfriend to bail him out.

== Critical reception ==
Billy Dukes of Taste of Country gave the song three and a half stars out of five, writing that "strong songwriting and clean country-rock production help 'Point at You' resonate with fans new and old." Ashley Cooke of Roughstock gave the song four stars out of five, calling it "lyrically a bit more adventurous and fun with a lyric that rings true to Justin's own life." In 2017, Billboard contributor Chuck Dauphin put "Point at You" at number eight on his top 10 list of Moore's best songs.

== Commercial performance ==
"Point at You" debuted at number 57 on the Billboard Country Airplay chart for the week of March 30, 2013. It also debuted at number 33 on the Billboard Hot Country Songs chart for the week of April 6. The song peaked at number 10 on the Hot Country Songs chart dated September 28, and number two on the Country Airplay chart the following week, staying for 29 weeks respectively. On the Billboard Hot 100, it debuted at number 97 the week of June 15, 2013. Fifteen weeks later, it peaked at number 53 the week of September 28, and stayed on the chart for nineteen weeks. It was certified gold by the RIAA on September 12, 2014.

In Canada, the track debuted at number 100 on the Canadian Hot 100 the week of August 10, 2013. It reappeared at number 95 the week of August 24 and reached number 80 the week of September 14 before leaving the chart. It peaked at number 71 the week of October 12, and remained on the chart for eleven weeks.

== Music video ==
The music video was directed by Peter Zavadil and premiered in May 2013. It tells the story of a man whose patient girlfriend repeatedly bails him out of jail and distracts the police when he gets in dangerous situations and fights. His girlfriend in the video is played by 2014 Miss Alabama USA winner Jesica Ahlberg. The video is a prequel to the music video for Moore's next single "Lettin' the Night Roll".

== Chart performance ==
Chart (2013)	Peak position
Canada Hot 100 (Billboard)	71
Canada Country (Billboard)	6
US Billboard Hot 100	53
US Hot Country Songs (Billboard)	10
US Country Airplay (Billboard)	2

=== Year-end charts ===
Chart (2013)	Position
US Country Airplay (Billboard)	6
US Hot Country Songs (Billboard)	39
US Radio Songs (Billboard)	71

== Certifications ==
Region	Certification	Certified units/sales
United States (RIAA)	Gold	500,000^{‡}
^{‡} Sales+streaming figures based on certification alone.
