= Poyen High School =

Location
- 111 North School Street; Poyen, Arkansas 72150; United States; 34°19′30″N 92°38′35″W

Information
- School type: Public comprehensive
- Status: Open
- School district: Poyen School District
- Superintendent: Jerry R. Newton
- CEEB code: 042100
- NCES School ID: 051173000893
- Principal: Dennis Emerson
- Teaching staff: 46.36
- Grades: 7–12
- Enrollment: 253 (2023–2024)
- Student to teacher ratio: 5.46
- Education system: ADE Smart Core
- Classes offered: Regular, Advanced Placement (AP)
- Colors: Purple and gold
- Athletics conference: 2A Region 5 (2012–14)
- Sports: Football, Golf, Basketball, Baseball, Softball, Track, Cheer
- Mascot: Indians
- Team name: Poyen Indians
- Accreditation: AdvancED
- Website: www.poyenschool.com/97675_2

Poyen High School is a comprehensive public high school located in Poyen, Arkansas, United States. It is one of two public high schools in Grant County and the sole high school administered by Poyen School District. For the 2010–11 school year, the school provides secondary education for more than 250 students in grades 7 through 12 and employs more than 20 educators.

== Academics ==
The assumed course of study for Poyen students follows the Smart Core curriculum developed by the Arkansas Department of Education (ADE), which requires students complete 22 units prior to graduation. Students complete regular coursework and exams and may elect to take Advanced Placement (AP) courses and exams with the opportunity for college credit. The school is accredited by the ADE.

== Athletics ==
The Poyen High School athletic emblem and mascot is the Indians with purple and gold serving as the school colors.

The Poyen Indians compete in interscholastic activities within the 2A Classification—the state's second smallest classification—via the 2A Region 5 Conference administered by the Arkansas Activities Association. The Indians field teams in football, golf (boys'/girls'), basketball (boys'/girls'), baseball, softball, and track and field (boys'/girls'), baseball, softball, competitive cheer and dance.

- Basketball: The boys' basketball team won a state basketball championship in 2002.
