= You Look Like I Need a Drink =

Single by Justin Moore

from the album Kinda Don't Care
- Released: November 17, 2015
- Recorded: 2015
- Genre: Country
- Length: 3:09
- Label: Valory Music Group
- Songwriters: Rodney Clawson; Matt Dragstrem; Natalie Hemby
- Producers: Julian Raymond; Jeremy Stover

Justin Moore singles chronology
"This Kind of Town" (2014)	"You Look Like I Need a Drink" (2015)	"Somebody Else Will" (2016)

"You Look Like I Need a Drink" is a song written by Rodney Clawson, Matt Dragstrem and Natalie Hemby and recorded by American country music artist Justin Moore. It was released in November 2015 as the first single from Moore's 2016 album Kinda Don't Care. The single topped the Country Airplay and Canada Country charts, and peaked at number 12 on the Hot Country Songs chart.

== Content ==
The song is a country rock influenced song in which the narrator drinks alcohol to face an impending breakup.

== Commercial performance ==
The song debuted at No. 41 on Country Airplay after its premiere on iHeartMedia stations on October 30, 2015 before its official add date of November 17. It also debuted at No. 34 on Hot Country Songs and No. 14 on Country Digital Songs, with 20,000 copies sold in its first week. The song has sold 165,000 copies in the US as of August 2016. For the week of October 8, 2016, it became Moore's fifth number one country single before disappearing from the Country Airplay chart entirely the following week, making it the first song in that chart's history to fall off the chart from number one.

== Music video ==
The music video was directed by Shane Drake and premiered in February 2016.

== Charts ==
=== Weekly charts ===
Chart (2015–2016)	Peak position
Canada Country (Billboard)	1
US Billboard Hot 100	79
US Country Airplay (Billboard)	1
US Hot Country Songs (Billboard)	12

=== Year end charts ===
Chart (2016)	Position
US Country Airplay (Billboard)	3
US Hot Country Songs (Billboard)	35

== Certifications ==
Region	Certification	Certified units/sales
United States (RIAA)	Platinum	165,000
