= Somebody Else Will =

Single by Justin Moore

from the album Kinda Don't Care
- Released: October 17, 2016
- Recorded: 2016
- Genre: Country
- Length: 2:45
- Label: Valory Music Group
- Songwriters: Kelly Archer; Adam Hambrick; Tebey Ottoh
- Producers: Julian Raymond; Jeremy Stover

Justin Moore singles chronology
"You Look Like I Need a Drink" (2015)	"Somebody Else Will" (2016)	"Kinda Don't Care" (2017)

"Somebody Else Will" is a song written by Kelly Archer, Adam Hambrick, and Tebey Ottoh, and recorded by American country music artist Justin Moore. It was released in October 2016 as the second single from Moore's fourth studio album Kinda Don't Care (2016). "Somebody Else Will" gave Moore his sixth number-one hit on the Billboard Country Airplay chart. It also reached numbers nine and 59 on the Hot Country Songs and Hot 100 charts respectively. The song was certified Gold by the Recording Industry Association of America (RIAA), and has sold 212,000 copies in that country as of September 2017. It achieved similar chart success in Canada, peaking at number five on the Country chart. An accompanying music video for the single was directed by Shane Drake.

== Commercial performance ==
"Somebody Else Will" debuted at number 59 on the Billboard Country Airplay chart dated November 12, 2016, but did not debut on the Hot Country Songs chart until it did so on February 4, 2017, at number 47. It reached number one on the Country Airplay chart in its 43rd week, giving Moore his sixth number one hit on that chart, and stayed there for 44 weeks. It also peaked at number nine on the Hot Country Songs chart dated September 2, remaining there for 31 weeks. On the Hot 100, the song debuted at number 97 the week of June 24, 2017. Ten weeks later, it peaked at number 59, and stayed on the chart for 13 weeks. It has sold 212,000 copies in the United States as of September 2017. In Canada, the track debuted at number 50 on the Canada Country chart the week of November 26, 2016, peaking at number five on September 16, 2017, and stayed on the chart for 33 weeks.

== Music video ==
The music video was directed by Shane Drake and premiered in January 2017.

== Live performance ==
On November 14, 2016, Moore performed "Somebody Else Will" live on NBC's Today.

== Charts ==
=== Weekly charts ===
Chart (2016–2017)	Peak position
Canada Country (Billboard)	5
US Billboard Hot 100	59
US Country Airplay (Billboard)	1
US Hot Country Songs (Billboard)	9

=== Year-end charts ===
Chart (2017)	Position
Canada Country (Billboard)	28
US Country Airplay (Billboard)	12
US Hot Country Songs (Billboard)	31

== Certifications ==
Certifications for Somebody Else Will
Region	Certification	Certified units/sales
United States (RIAA)	Gold	500,000^{‡}
^{‡} Sales+streaming figures based on certification alone.
