= Late Nights and Longnecks =

Studio album by Justin Moore
- Released: July 26, 2019
- Genre: Country
- Length: 33:44
- Label: Valory Music Group
- Producers: Jeremy Stover; Scott Borchetta

Justin Moore chronology
Kinda Don't Care (2016)	Late Nights and Longnecks (2019)	Straight Outta the Country (2021)

Singles from Late Nights and Longnecks
- 1. "The Ones That Didn't Make It Back Home" Released: October 12, 2018; 2. "Why We Drink" Released: September 30, 2019

Late Nights and Longnecks is the fifth studio album by American country music singer Justin Moore. It was released on July 26, 2019 via Valory Music Group, an imprint of Big Machine Records. It includes the singles "The Ones That Didn't Make It Back Home" and "Why We Drink". It is the first album in which Moore co-wrote all of the songs.

== Promotion ==
"The Ones That Didn't Make It Back Home" was released as the lead single from the album on October 12, 2018, and it became Moore's seventh Number One hit on the Billboard Country Airplay chart for the week dated September 6, 2019.

Moore revealed the cover art and track listing on February 22, 2019, and released "Jesus and Jack Daniels" as a promotional single on March 8, 2019. "Why We Drink" was released on September 30, 2019, as the album's second single to country radio.

== Commercial performance ==
The album debuted at No. 2 on the Top Country Albums chart with 19,000 units, 14,000 of which are traditional album sales. The album has sold 36,400 copies in the United States as of March 2020.

== Track listing ==
All tracks are written by Justin Moore and Jeremy Stover, with additional co-writers as noted.

No.	Title	Writer(s)	Length
1.	"Why We Drink"	Casey Beathard; David Lee Murphy	3:31
2.	"That's My Boy"	Beathard	3:10
3.	"The Ones That Didn't Make It Back Home"	Paul DiGiovanni; Chase McGill	3:11
4.	"Jesus and Jack Daniels"	DiGiovanni; McGill	3:04
5.	"Airport Bar"	Beathard; DiGiovanni	2:54
6.	"Small Town Street Cred"	DiGiovanni; McGill	3:52
7.	"Never Gonna Drink Again"	Rhett Akins; DiGiovanni	4:09
8.	"On the Rocks"	DiGiovanni; McGill	3:30
9.	"Someday I Gotta Quit"	Beathard; DiGiovanni	3:37
10.	"Good Times Don't"	DiGiovanni; McGill	2:46
Total length:			33:44

Deluxe Edition (Target exclusive)
No.	Title	Writer(s)	Length
11.	"Selfish Man"	Jamie Paulin	3:43
12.	"She's Got Lovin' on Her Mind"	Brandon Kinney	2:43
13.	"High on Life"	Brian Maher	3:46
Total length:			43:56

== Personnel ==
Adapted from AllMusic

- Sarah Buxton - background vocals
- Paul DiGiovanni - acoustic guitar, keyboards, programming
- Paul Franklin - steel guitar
- Evan Hutchings - drums
- Brent Mason - electric guitar
- Justin Moore - lead vocals
- Jason Kyle Saetviet - background vocals
- Jimmie Lee Sloas - bass guitar
- Ilya Toshinsky - dobro, acoustic guitar
- Will Weatherly - keyboards
- Derek Wells - electric guitar

== Charts ==
=== Weekly charts ===
Chart (2019)	Peak position
Australian Digital Albums (ARIA)	7
Canadian Albums (Billboard)	82
US Billboard 200	22
US Top Country Albums (Billboard)	2

=== Year-end charts ===
Chart (2019)	Position
US Top Country Albums (Billboard)	68
