= If Heaven Wasn't So Far Away =

Single by Justin Moore

from the album Outlaws Like Me
- Released: February 28, 2011
- Genre: Country
- Length: 3:44
- Label: Valory Music Group
- Songwriters: Dallas Davidson; Rob Hatch; Brett Jones
- Producer: Jeremy Stover

Justin Moore singles chronology
"How I Got to Be This Way" (2010)	"If Heaven Wasn't So Far Away" (2011)	"Bait a Hook" (2011)

"If Heaven Wasn't So Far Away" is a song written by Dallas Davidson, Rob Hatch and Brett Jones. It was first recorded by American country music artist Rhett Akins, whose version was released as a single in September 2006 but did not chart. Justin Moore covered the song and released it as a single in February 2011 as the lead-off single to his second studio album Outlaws Like Me. Moore's cover is his fifth single release, his third top 10 hit, and his second number one single.

== Background ==
Moore said he chose to record the song because he thought that it was "one of those songs you hear one time, and know immediately that it’s special."

== Content ==
"If Heaven Wasn't So Far Away" is a ballad in which a young man fantasizes about being able to spend a day in Heaven, visiting friends and family members who have died. The man begins his fantasy when he drives across a bridge near a fishing spot where he and his grandfather spent time and bonded, and the grandfather also operated a fruit stand. Now a family man, he wonders what his children would think of their great grandfather upon meeting him.

Other decedents the man thinks about connecting with include a cousin John (who was killed in action in Vietnam), his hunting dog, three teenage girls who were classmates of his in 1999, and singers Hank Williams and Janis Joplin. With the later two, he says he would ask Williams why he took pills that eventually killed him "back in '53" and he asks Joplin to sing the second verse of "Me and Bobby McGee".

The central theme is the ability to cross the mortal divide and reconnect with loved ones lost long ago.

== Critical reception ==
Brian Mansfield of USA Today gave the song a positive review, calling it "a tearjerker in the classic country mold." Giving it a "thumbs up" rating, Karlie Justus of Engine 145 noted the "small details" of the first verse and Moore's "easy twang," but thought that the second verse was not as well written. In 2017, Billboard contributor Chuck Dauphin placed "If Heaven Wasn't So Far Away" at number one on his top 10 list of Moore's best songs.

== Chart performance ==
Chart (2011)	Peak position
Canada Country (Billboard)	4
Canada Hot 100 (Billboard)	76
US Billboard Hot 100	49
US Hot Country Songs (Billboard)	1

=== Year-end charts ===
Chart (2011)	Position
US Country Songs (Billboard)	14

== Certifications ==
Region	Certification	Certified units/sales
United States (RIAA)	2× Platinum	2,000,000^{‡}
^{‡} Sales+streaming figures based on certification alone.
