= How I Got to Be This Way =

Single by Justin Moore

from the album Justin Moore
- Released: June 1, 2010
- Genre: Country
- Length: 2:58
- Label: Valory Music Group
- Songwriters: Justin Moore; Jeremy Stover; Rivers Rutherford
- Producer: Jeremy Stover

Justin Moore singles chronology
"Backwoods" (2009)	"How I Got to Be This Way" (2010)	"If Heaven Wasn't So Far Away" (2011)

"How I Got to Be This Way" is a song co-written and recorded by American country music artist Justin Moore. It was released in June 2010 as the fourth single from his self-titled debut album. The song was written by Moore, Rivers Rutherford and Jeremy Stover.

== Critical reception ==
Matt Bjorke of Roughstock described the song positively in his review of the album, saying that it had a similar rock influence to the work of Jason Aldean but was comparably more authentic. Bobby Peacock of Roughstock gave the song three and a half stars out of five, writing that Moore "has a down-home, everyman twang to his voice, lending the right amount of authenticity to his country-boy anthems" and that "the melody and production are a pleasing throwback to the early-mid 1990s."

== Music video ==
The music video was directed by Chris Hicky and premiered in July 2010. It begins and ends with Moore explaining what the song means to him, and that everything in the song is true. It shows him and his band performing in a deserted alleyway and on stage at a concert, while Moore also performs solo in a doorway as childhood pictures of him appear throughout.

== Chart performance ==
The song debuted on the U.S. Billboard Hot Country Songs charts at number 54 for the week of June 12, 2010.

Chart (2010)	Peak position
Canada Country (Billboard)	42
US Hot Country Songs (Billboard)	17
US Billboard Bubbling Under Hot 100	1

=== Year-end charts ===
Chart (2010)	Position
US Country Songs (Billboard)	60
