= Kinda Don't Care (song) =

Single by Justin Moore

from the album Kinda Don't Care
- Released: September 18, 2017
- Genre: Country
- Length: 4:21 (album version); 3:04 (radio edit)
- Label: Valory
- Songwriters: Rhett Akins; Ben Hayslip; Ross Copperman
- Producer: Jeremy Stover

Justin Moore singles chronology
"Somebody Else Will" (2017)	"Kinda Don't Care" (2017)	"The Ones That Didn't Make It Back Home" (2018)

"Kinda Don't Care" is a song by American country music singer Justin Moore. It is the title track to, and the third single from, his fourth studio album Kinda Don't Care. The song was written by Rhett Akins, Ben Hayslip, and Ross Copperman.

== History ==
Moore told The Boot that his producer Jeremy Stover found the song when seeking material for an album, and that Moore was inspired to record it because he knew that Rhett Akins and Ross Copperman, with whom he had written previously, were writers on the song. He thought that the lyrics had "unique ideas", and that the song's sound reminded him of Hank Williams Jr. He also said that he wanted to release it as a single because it had received positive reactions in concert even before it was released.

A music video, directed by Cody Villalobos, features Moore performing the song at various live shows.

== Charts ==
=== Weekly charts ===
Chart (2017–2018)	Peak position
Canada Country (Billboard)	43
US Bubbling Under Hot 100 (Billboard)	23
US Country Airplay (Billboard)	17
US Hot Country Songs (Billboard)	28

=== Year-end charts ===
Chart (2018)	Position
US Country Airplay (Billboard)	59
US Hot Country Songs (Billboard)	71

== Certifications ==
Certifications for Kinda Don't Care
Region	Certification	Certified units/sales
Canada (Music Canada)	Gold	40,000^{‡}
^{‡} Sales+streaming figures based on certification alone.
