= The Ones That Didn't Make It Back Home =

Single by Justin Moore

from the album Late Nights and Longnecks
- Released: October 12, 2018
- Genre: Country
- Length: 3:11
- Label: Valory Music Co.
- Songwriters: Paul DiGiovanni; Chase McGill; Justin Moore; Jeremy Stover
- Producers: Jeremy Stover; Scott Borchetta

Justin Moore singles chronology
"Kinda Don't Care" (2017)	"The Ones That Didn't Make It Back Home" (2018)	"Why We Drink" (2019)

"The Ones That Didn't Make It Back Home" is a song recorded by American country music singer Justin Moore. It is the first single to his fifth studio album Late Nights and Longnecks. Moore wrote the song with Paul DiGiovanni, Chase McGill, and Jeremy Stover, who also co- produced it with Scott Borchetta.

== Content ==
Moore wrote the song with his producer, Jeremy Stover, along with Boys Like Girls member Paul DiGiovanni and songwriter Chase McGill. The song, which according to Rolling Stone features "a soaring chorus and weeping guitar work", pays tribute to soldiers who did not return from duty. Angela Stefano of the blog The Boot said of the song that "Listeners who are expecting a somber melody won't get that, though the lyrics are still devastating enough to draw a tear or two." and "The lyrics are just specific enough to paint a vivid picture, yet they're general enough to evoke the stories of any number of fallen military members." Moore said that the song's message was inspired by his paternal grandparents.

== Commercial performance ==
The song has sold 61,000 copies in the United States as of September 2019.

== Music video ==
The Music video premiered on February 6, 2019. The video was directed by Cody Villalobos, who is Moore's social media manager and a former emergency medical technician. Villalobos said that he was inspired to include not only soldiers, but also policemen and firefighters in the video due to it being released soon after the Stoneman Douglas High School shooting.

== Charts ==
=== Weekly charts ===
Chart (2018–2019)	Peak position
US Billboard Hot 100	46
US Country Airplay (Billboard)	1
US Hot Country Songs (Billboard)	7

=== Year-end charts ===
Chart (2019)	Position
US Country Airplay (Billboard)	4
US Hot Country Songs (Billboard)	30

== Certifications ==
Certifications for "The Ones That Didn't Make It Back Home"
Region	Certification	Certified units/sales
Canada (Music Canada)	Gold	40,000^{‡}
United States (RIAA)	Platinum	1,000,000^{‡}
^{‡} Sales+streaming figures based on certification alone.
