= Poyen, Arkansas =

- Town
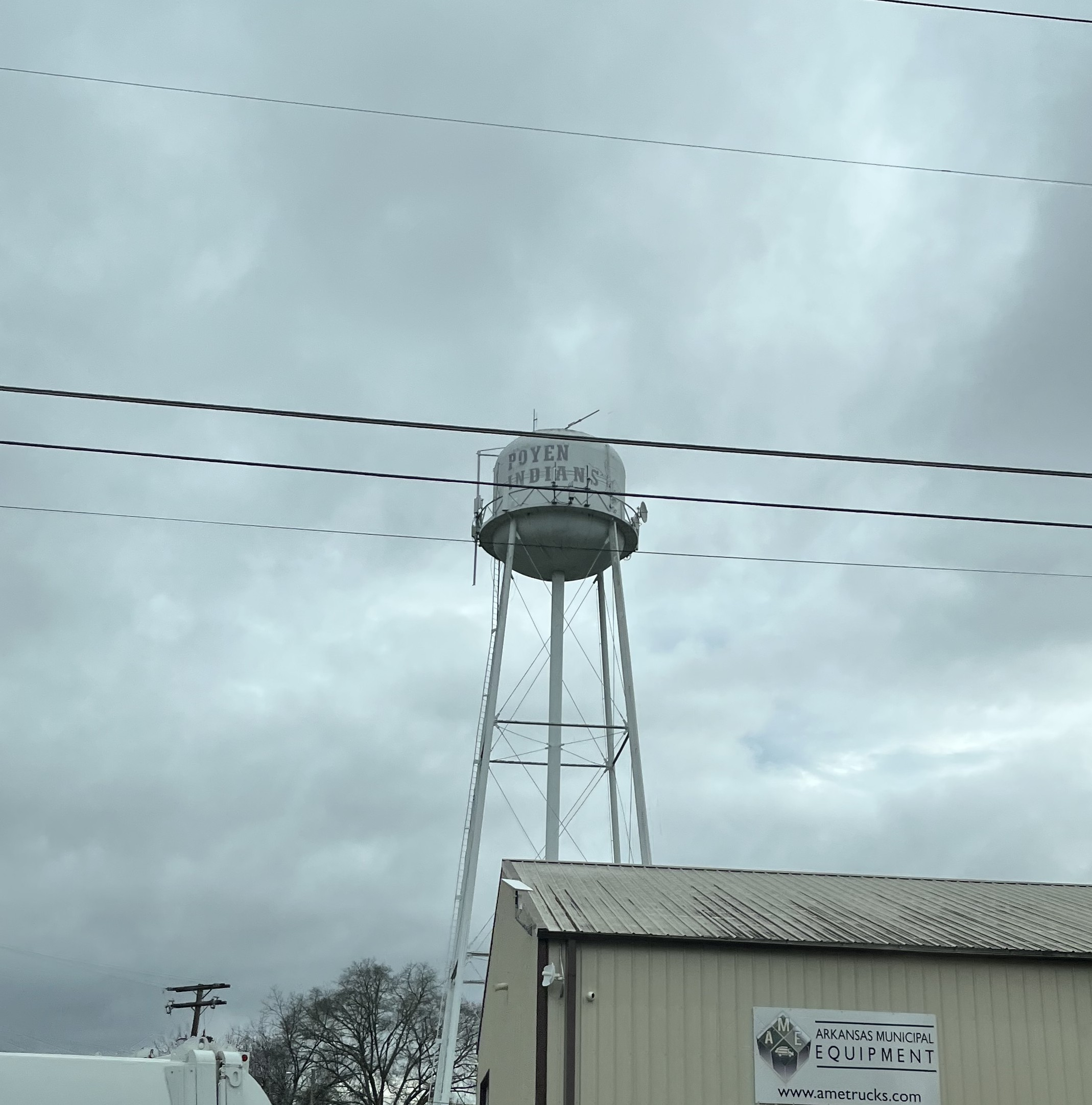
- Poyen Water Tower

- Location of Poyen in Grant County, Arkansas.
- Coordinates: 34°19′27″N 92°38′31″W
- Country: United States
- State: Arkansas
- County: Grant

Area
  - Total: 0.31 sq mi (0.79 km^{2})
  - Land: 0.31 sq mi (0.79 km^{2})
  - Water: 0 sq mi (0.00 km^{2})
- Elevation: 236 ft (72 m)

Population (2020)
  - Total: 263
  - Estimate (2025): 275 ▲
  - Density: 859.2/sq mi (331.74/km^{2})
- Time zone: UTC-6 (Central (CST))
  - Summer (DST): UTC-5 (CDT)
- ZIP code: 72128
- Area code: 501
- FIPS code: 05-57080
- GNIS feature ID: 2407157

Poyen is a town in Grant County, Arkansas, United States. As of the 2020 census, Poyen had a population of 263. It is part of the Central Arkansas region.

== Geography ==
Poyen is located in western Grant County. U.S. Route 270 passes through the center of town, leading east 14 miles (23 km) to Sheridan, the county seat, and west 10 miles (16 km) to Malvern.

According to the United States Census Bureau, the town has a total area of 0.3 square miles (0.8 km^{2}), all land.

== Demographics ==
Historical population
Census	Pop.	Note	%±
1960	312		—
1970	265		−15.1%
1980	329		24.2%
1990	303		−7.9%
2000	272		−10.2%
2010	290		6.6%
2020	263		−9.3%
2025 (est.)	275	▲	4.6%
U.S. Decennial Census

As of the census of 2000, there were 272 people, 106 households, and 82 families residing in the town. The population density was 1,105.6 inhabitants per square mile (426.9/km^{2}). There were 112 housing units at an average density of 455.2 per square mile (175.8/km^{2}). The racial makeup of the town was 95.23% White, 1.84% Black or African American, 0.74% Native American, 1.47% from other races, and 0.74% from two or more races. 1.84% of the population were Hispanic or Latino of any race.

There were 106 households, out of which 33.0% had children under the age of 18 living with them, 58.5% were married couples living together, 14.2% had a female householder with no husband present, and 22.6% were non-families. 21.7% of all households were made up of individuals, and 11.3% had someone living alone who was 65 years of age or older. The average household size was 2.57 and the average family size was 2.99.

In the town, the population was spread out, with 25.7% under the age of 18, 7.7% from 18 to 24, 29.8% from 25 to 44, 25.0% from 45 to 64, and 11.8% who were 65 years of age or older. The median age was 36 years. For every 100 females, there were 100.0 males. For every 100 females age 18 and over, there were 90.6 males.

The median income for a household in the town was $30,625, and the median income for a family was $37,500. Males had a median income of $27,813 versus $20,313 for females. The per capita income for the town was $13,835. About 2.8% of families and 4.3% of the population were below the poverty line, including 5.1% of those under the age of eighteen and 3.6% of those 65 or over.

== Education ==
Public education for early childhood, elementary and secondary school students is provided by the Poyen School District, which leads to graduation from Poyen High School.

== Notable person ==
Country music singer Justin Moore is a native and currently resides in Poyen, Arkansas.
