= Poyen School District =

School district in Arkansas, United States

Address
- 14296 Highway 270 West Poyen, Arkansas, 72128; United States

District information
- Type: Public
- Grades: PreK–12
- NCES District ID: 0511730

Students and staff
- Students: 540
- Teachers: 69.04
- Staff: 40.22
- Student–teacher ratio: 7.82

Other information
- Website: www.poyenschool.com

Poyen School District 1 is a school district in Grant County, Arkansas.

== Schools ==
The District includes:

- Poyen Elementary School
- Poyen High School
