= With a Woman You Love =

Single by Justin Moore

from the album Stray Dog
- Released: October 1, 2021
- Genre: Country
- Length: 2:54
- Label: Valory
- Songwriters: Justin Moore; Paul DiGiovanni; Chase McGill; Jeremy Stover
- Producers: Jeremy Stover; Scott Borchetta

Justin Moore singles chronology
"We Didn't Have Much" (2020)	"With a Woman You Love" (2021)	"You, Me, & Whiskey" (2022)

"With a Woman You Love" is a song by American country music singer Justin Moore. It was released in October 2021 as the lead single to Moore's seventh studio album Stray Dog. Moore co-wrote the song with Paul DiGiovanni, Chase McGill and Jeremy Stover, the latter of whom co-produced the song.

== Content ==
The song has a romantic theme, described by the blog Whiskey Riff as a tribute to Moore's wife, Kate. Moore told The Boot that the idea came to him when he was driving through Florida, and that he considered the song to have a similar sound to country music from the early 1990s.

== Charts ==
=== Weekly charts ===
Weekly chart performance for "With a Woman You Love"
Chart (2021–2022)	Peak position
Canada Hot 100 (Billboard)	59
Canada Country (Billboard)	3
US Billboard Hot 100	59
US Country Airplay (Billboard)	1
US Hot Country Songs (Billboard)	12

=== Year-end charts ===
2022 year-end chart performance for "With a Woman You Love"
Chart (2022)	Position
US Country Airplay (Billboard)	23
US Hot Country Songs (Billboard)	56
US Radio Songs (Billboard)	63

== Certifications ==
Certifications for With A Woman You Love
Region	Certification	Certified units/sales
Canada (Music Canada)	Gold	40,000^{‡}
United States (RIAA)	Gold	500,000^{‡}
^{‡} Sales+streaming figures based on certification alone.
