= Lettin' the Night Roll =

Single by Justin Moore

from the album Off the Beaten Path
- Released: October 21, 2013
- Recorded: 2013
- Genre: Country
- Length: 3:23
- Label: Valory Music Group
- Songwriters: Justin Moore; Jeremy Stover; Rodney Clawson
- Producer: Jeremy Stover

Justin Moore singles chronology
"Point at You" (2013)	"Lettin' the Night Roll" (2013)	"Small Town Throwdown" (2014)

"Lettin' the Night Roll" is a song co-written and recorded by American country music artist Justin Moore. It was released in October 2013 as the second single from his third studio album Off the Beaten Path. The song was written by Moore, Jeremy Stover and Rodney Clawson. "Lettin' the Night Roll" peaked at number one on the Billboard Country Airplay chart, giving Moore his fourth number-one country hit overall. It also charted at numbers seven and 49 on both the Hot Country Songs and Hot 100 charts respectively. It was certified Platinum by the Recording Industry Association of America (RIAA), and has sold 413,000 units in the United States as of June 2014. The song garnered similar chart success in Canada, peaking at number four on the Country chart and number 67 on the Canadian Hot 100. The accompanying music video for the song was directed by Peter Zavadil and is a sequel to Moore's previous single "Point at You", with Jessica Ahlberg reprising her role as his girlfriend and going out in the town at night.

== Critical reception ==
The song received a favorable review from Taste of Country, which said that "the specifics are what set the song apart from others that borrow from the same spice rack of country song cooking." It concluded that "the singer isn’t veering from a course that’s clearly working for him."

== Music video ==
The music video was directed by Peter Zavadil and premiered in December 2013. The video is a sequel to the music video of Moore's previous single "Point at You", and begins where the previous video ends (with a police chase). Jesica Ahlberg, who played Moore's girlfriend in the "Point at You" video, reprises her role in this video. The video shows Moore and his girlfriend acting out the song's lyrics by driving around town late at night and running from the police. After stopping at a truck stop so she can change, they eventually find a closed high school, to which they find an unlocked door and break in. She then goes to a trophy cabinet and changes into a cheerleader uniform. It ends the next day, with the two of them in the bleachers watching a high school football game. In between these scenes, Moore is shown standing in the hallway of the school at night, the locker room, and the gym, singing the song and playing guitar.

== Chart performance ==
"Lettin' the Night Roll" debuted at number 48 on the Billboard Hot Country Songs chart for the week of October 5, 2013. It also debuted at number 55 on the Billboard Country Airplay chart for the week of November 9. On the Billboard Hot 100, it debuted at number 100 the week of March 8, 2014. Sixteen weeks later, it peaked at number 49 the week of June 27, and stayed on the chart for twenty weeks. It was certified platinum by the Recording Industry Association of America (RIAA) on March 13, 2018. The song has sold 413,000 copies in the U.S. as of June 2014.

In Canada, the track debuted at number 96 on the Canadian Hot 100 for the week of April 26, 2014 before leaving the chart. It reappeared at number 100 the week of May 17, and peaked at number 67 the week of June 27, remaining on the chart for twelve weeks.

Chart (2013–2014)	Peak position
Canada Hot 100 (Billboard)	67
Canada Country (Billboard)	4
US Billboard Hot 100	49
US Country Airplay (Billboard)	1
US Hot Country Songs (Billboard)	7

=== Year-end charts ===
Chart (2014)	Position
US Country Airplay (Billboard)	2
US Hot Country Songs (Billboard)	31

== Certifications ==
Region	Certification	Certified units/sales
United States (RIAA)	Platinum	1,000,000^{‡}
^{‡} Sales+streaming figures based on certification alone.
