= Bait a Hook =

Single by Justin Moore

from the album Outlaws Like Me
- Released: August 1, 2011
- Genre: Country
- Length: 3:29
- Label: Valory Music Group
- Songwriters: Rhett Akins; Justin Moore; Jeremy Stover
- Producer: Jeremy Stover

Justin Moore singles chronology
"If Heaven Wasn't So Far Away" (2011)	"Bait a Hook" (2011)	"Til My Last Day" (2012)

"Bait a Hook" is a song co-written and recorded by American country music artist Justin Moore. It was released in August 2011 as the second single from his 2011 album Outlaws Like Me. The song became Moore's fifth top 20 hit on the Billboard Hot Country Songs chart, with a peak at number 17. It also reached number 63 on the Billboard Hot 100 chart. The song was certified Gold by the Recording Industry Association of America (RIAA), denoting sales of over 500,000 units in the United States. Reviews for the track were generally mixed, with critics divided over the premise and its lyrical content.

== Content ==
The song talks about the male narrator's former lover choosing another man, who he expresses dislike for and is more sophisticated than he is as well as how he cannot do the things that the narrator himself can ("He can't bait a hook, he can't even skin a buck"). He criticizes that man for driving a Toyota Prius and eating sushi and tells the woman in the chorus that "I ain't even worried, you'll come running back." By the end of the song, he recalls his former love’s temper and realizes it’s better her new lover has to deal with that now instead of him.

Moore co-wrote this song with Rhett Akins and Jeremy Stover. He told Taste of Country that the idea came to him after he thought that "everybody hates their ex-boyfriend or ex-girlfriend, and it’d be pretty funny if maybe she went with somebody completely opposite of you."

== Critical reception ==
"Bait a Hook" was generally received mixed reviews from music critics. Some praised the song for its witty premise, while others commented on its content negatively. Billy Dukes of Taste of Country gave the song four stars out of five, saying that "Moore and his songwriting partners pieced this one together with precision, leaving no rough edges for listeners to get snagged." Kevin John Coyne of Country Universe gave the song a failing grade, calling it "drivel" and finding it to be poorly done and just in bad taste. Some people even criticized the lyrics in the song. In 2017, Billboard contributor Chuck Dauphin put "Bait a Hook" at number four on his top 10 list of Moore's best songs.

== Music video ==
The music video was directed by Shane Drake and premiered on October 15, 2011 during the Bank of America 500. The video features a woman — Justin Moore's ex-partner — and her new boyfriend played by NASCAR driver Carl Edwards opposite Moore. It shows both men and contrasts their ways of life like the song entails. This video was later made to be available for purchase through iTunes on November 8, 2011.

== Chart and sales performance ==
"Bait a Hook" debuted at number 50 on the Billboard Hot Country Songs chart for the week of August 13, 2011. It also debuted at number 100 on the U.S. Billboard Hot 100 chart for the week of November 12, 2011. Later, it reached number 63 on the Billboard Hot 100 (becoming Moore's fourth song to enter the Top 100) and peaked at number 17 on Hot Country Songs. That became his fifth to break the top 20 on that chart.

== Charts and certifications ==
Chart (2011–2012)	Peak position
Canada Country (Billboard)	35
US Hot Country Songs (Billboard)	17
US Billboard Hot 100	63

=== Year-end charts ===
Year	Chart	Position
2011	US Country Songs (Billboard)	98
2012	US Country Songs (Billboard)	73

=== Certifications ===
Region	Certification	Certified units/sales
United States (RIAA)	Gold	500,000^{^}
^{^} Shipments figures based on certification alone.
