= Outlaws Like Me =

Studio album by Justin Moore
- Released: June 21, 2011
- Recorded: 2010–11
- Genre: Country
- Label: The Valory Music Co.
- Producer: Jeremy Stover

Justin Moore chronology
Justin Moore (2009)	Outlaws Like Me (2011)	Off the Beaten Path (2013)

Singles from Outlaws Like Me
- 1. "If Heaven Wasn't So Far Away" Released: February 28, 2011; 2. "Bait a Hook" Released: August 1, 2011; 3. "Til My Last Day" Released: March 19, 2012

Outlaws Like Me is the second studio album by American country music artist Justin Moore. It was released on June 21, 2011 via The Valory Music Co. The album's first single, "If Heaven Wasn't So Far Away", became Moore's second number one hit on the US Billboard Hot Country Songs chart. Its single, "Bait a Hook" reached the top 20 at number 17. The third single, "Til My Last Day", peaked at number one on the Country Airplay chart. Moore co-wrote eleven of the thirteen songs on the album.

== Promotion ==
On February 2, 2013, Moore announced his first headline tour, with Dustin Lynch and Jon Pardi as supporting acts, starting on March 14 in Pikeville's Eastern Kentucky Expo Center and ending on April 20 at The Corbin Arena.

== Reception ==
=== Commercial ===
Outlaws Like Me debuted at number five on the Billboard 200, and number one on the Top Country Albums chart after selling 65,000 copies during its first week of release. As of September 2013, the album has sold 577,000 copies in the United States.

=== Critical ===
Professional ratings
Review scores
Source	Rating
AllMusic	3/5 stars
Roughstock	1/5 stars

Giving it three stars out of five, AllMusic's Stephen Thomas Erlewine thought that the album was an improvement over Moore's debut. He thought that the sound was "a leaner country rock" and said that it "packs a punch that carries through on the promise of Moore's braggadocio". Dan MacIntosh of Roughstock gave the album one star out of five, referring to the album's lead single, "If Heaven Wasn't So Far Away," as "an exception to an otherwise classless effort." He found the record pandering and relying heavily on country stereotypes. In 2017, Billboard contributor Chuck Dauphin placed three tracks from the album on his top 10 list of Moore's best songs: "If Heaven Wasn't So Far Away" at number one, "Bait a Hook" at number four and "Til My Last Day" at number six.

== Track listing ==
Standard/CD/MP3 download
No.	Title	Writer(s)	Length
1.	"Redneck Side"	Kris Bergsnes; Rick Giles; Jeremy Stover	2:34
2.	"My Kind of Woman"	Brian Dean Maher; Justin Moore; Stover	2:43
3.	"If Heaven Wasn't So Far Away"	Dallas Davidson; Rob Hatch; Brett Jones	3:43
4.	"Run Out of Honky Tonks"	Moore; Jamie Paulin; Ashe Underwood	3:42
5.	"Beer Time"	Rhett Akins; Moore; Stover	2:49
6.	"Bait a Hook"	Akins; Moore; Stover	3:28
7.	"Flyin' Down a Back Road"	Moore; Paulin; Stover	3:51
8.	"If You Don't Like My Twang"	Akins; Moore; Stover	3:40
9.	"Guns"	Moore; Paulin; Stover	3:53
10.	"Sunshine Babies"	Akins; Moore; Stover	3:01
11.	"Til My Last Day"	Maher; Moore; Stover	3:54
12.	"Bed of My Chevy"	Moore; Stover	3:26
13.	"Outlaws Like Me"	Moore; Stover	5:51
Total length:			46:40

== Personnel ==
- Jim "Moose" Brown - keyboards
- Perry Coleman - background vocals
- Larry Franklin - fiddle
- Tommy Harden - drums
- Mike Johnson - steel guitar
- Doug Kahan - bass guitar
- Troy Lancaster - electric guitar
- Justin Moore - lead vocals
- Russ Pahl - steel guitar
- Mike Rojas - keyboards
- Curt Ryle - acoustic guitar
- Jason Kyle Saetveit - background vocals
- Steve Sheehan - acoustic guitar
- Russell Terrell - background vocals

== Chart performance ==
=== Weekly charts ===
Chart (2011)	Peak position
US Billboard 200	5
US Top Country Albums (Billboard)	1

=== Year-end charts ===
Chart (2011)	Position
US Billboard 200	103
US Top Country Albums (Billboard)	25
Chart (2012)	Position
US Billboard 200	177
US Top Country Albums (Billboard)	30

=== Singles ===
Year	Single	Peak chart positions					Certifications (sales threshold)
Year	Single	US Country	US Country Airplay	US	CAN Country	CAN	Certifications (sales threshold)
2011	"If Heaven Wasn't So Far Away"	1	—	49	—	76	US: Platinum
2011	"Bait a Hook"	17	—	63	—	—	US: Gold
2012	"Til My Last Day"	7	1	51	8	76	US: Gold
"—" denotes releases that did not chart

== Certifications ==
Region	Certification	Certified units/sales
United States (RIAA)	Platinum	577,000
