= Off the Beaten Path (Justin Moore album) =

Studio album by Justin Moore
- Released: September 17, 2013
- Genre: Country
- Label: Valory Music Group
- Producer: Jeremy Stover

Justin Moore chronology
Outlaws Like Me (2011)	Off the Beaten Path (2013)	Kinda Don't Care (2016)

Singles from Off the Beaten Path
- 1. "Point at You" Released: March 18, 2013; 2. "Lettin' the Night Roll" Released: October 21, 2013; 3. "This Kind of Town" Released: October 20, 2014

Off the Beaten Path is the third studio album by American country music artist Justin Moore. It was released on September 17, 2013 via Valory Music Group. The album includes duets with Miranda Lambert and Charlie Daniels. A deluxe edition was also made available. The album has sold 364,000 copies in the US as of June 2016.

The album includes the singles "Point at You", "Lettin' the Night Roll" and "This Kind of Town".

== Critical reception ==
Professional ratings
Review scores
Source	Rating
AllMusic	4/5 stars
Country Weekly	C+
Digital Journal	4.5/5 stars
Got Country Online	5/5 stars
Roughstock	4/5 stars
USA Today	2/4 stars

Off the Beaten Path garnered generally positive reception by music critics to critique the album. At AllMusic, Stephen Thomas Erlewine felt that the release had "an air of authenticity." Markos Papadatos of Digital Journal proclaimed that Moore "stays true to his roots" on an album that was "highly eclectic and a real treat", and called the album "a well-crafted musical work". At Roughstock, Ashley Cooke wrote that "Justin Moore stays true to his cowboy hat, the Country way and the twang we've grown to love with Off The Beaten Path." In agreement, Raina Smith of Got Country Online felt that "Justin stays true to his cowboy hat and roots that’s for sure in this modern and traditional country music album." At The New York Times, Jon Caramanica wrote a positive review, and noted that Moore "engages in a bait and switch: cloaking old-school values with new-school references. He is in no way a dissenter, merely someone who understands that old forms can stand even stronger with injections of new ideas." Furthermore, Caraminica vowed that "Mr. Moore is solid in his convictions: that country music of the 1970s, the more accessible side of the outlaw years, is worth preserving, and that the true modern spirit of that sound is mindful of the rest of the world." However, Bob Paxman at Country Weekly evoked that the release "mostly serves up an array of clichéd, mediocre tunes about the majesty of the country lifestyle." At USA Today, Brian Mansfield told that Moore "may sing about small towns, heaven and redemptive love with unquestionable conviction", but he "just can't recover" to make his album truly special. In 2017, Billboard contributor Chuck Dauphin placed one track from the album on his top 10 list of Moore's best songs: "Point at You" at number eight.

== Track listing ==
No.	Title	Writer(s)	Length
1.	"Old Back in the New School"	Lance Miller; Austin Cunningham; Brad Warren, Brett Warren	2:56
2.	"Lettin' the Night Roll"	Justin Moore; Jeremy Stover; Rodney Clawson	3:23
3.	"Old Habits" (featuring Miranda Lambert)	Brian Dean Maher; Josh Hoge; Adam Hambrick	3:49
4.	"Point at You"	Ross Copperman; Rhett Akins; Ben Hayslip	3:00
5.	"I'd Want It to Be Yours"	Moore; Stover; Brandon Kinney	3:16
6.	"This Kind of Town"	Andrew Dorff; Chris Tompkins	3:51
7.	"Country Radio"	Moore; Stover; David Lee Murphy	2:44
8.	"That's How I Know You Love Me"	Justin Weaver; Clawson, Tompkins	4:36
9.	"Off the Beaten Path"	Stover; Chris Janson; Kinney	3:14
10.	"One Dirt Road"	Moore; Stover; Jamie Paulin	3:41
11.	"For Some Ol' Redneck Reason" (featuring Charlie Daniels)	Akins; Moore; Stover	4:32
Total length:			33:08

Deluxe Edition
No.	Title	Writer(s)	Length
1.	"Old Back in the New School"	Lance Miller; Austin Cunningham; Brad Warren, Brett Warren	2:56
2.	"Beer"	Justin Moore; Jeremy Stover; Brandon Kinney	3:13
3.	"Lettin' the Night Roll"	Moore; Stover; Rodney Clawson	3:23
4.	"Old Habits" (featuring Miranda Lambert)	Brian Maher; Josh Hoge; Adam Hambrick	3:49
5.	"Point at You"	Ross Copperman; Rhett Akins; Ben Hayslip	3:00
6.	"Wheels"	Moore; Stover; Maher	3:29
7.	"I'd Want It to Be Yours"	Moore; Stover; Kinney	3:16
8.	"This Kind of Town"	Andrew Dorff; Chris Tompkins	3:51
9.	"Dirt Road Kid"	Stover; Brett Jones	3:25
10.	"Country Radio"	Moore; Stover; David Lee Murphy	2:44
11.	"That's How I Know You Love Me"	Justin Weaver; Clawson; Tompkins	4:36
12.	"Off the Beaten Path"	Stover; Chris Janson; Kinney	3:14
13.	"One Dirt Road"	Moore; Stover; Jamie Paulin	3:41
14.	"Field Fulla Hillbillies"	Bobby Huff; Shane Minor; Murphy	3:17
15.	"Big Ass Headache"	Moore; Stover; Kinney	3:34
16.	"For Some Ol' Redneck Reason" (featuring Charlie Daniels)	Akins; Moore; Stover	4:32
Total length:			56:10

== Personnel ==
- Jim "Moose" Brown - keyboards
- Perry Coleman - background vocals
- Roger Coleman - electric guitar
- Charlie Daniels - vocals on "For Some Ol' Redneck Reason"
- Shannon Forrest - drums
- Tommy Harden - drums
- Mike Johnson - steel guitar
- Doug Kahan - bass guitar
- Miranda Lambert - vocals on "Old Habits"
- Troy Lancaster - electric guitar
- Justin Moore - lead vocals
- Michael Rhodes - bass guitar
- Mike Rojas - keyboards
- Steve Sheehan - acoustic guitar
- Adam Shoenfeld - electric guitar
- Russell Terrell - background vocals

== Chart performance ==
=== Weekly charts ===
Chart (2013–14)	Peak position
Canadian Albums (Billboard)	5
US Billboard 200	2
US Top Country Albums (Billboard)	1

=== Year-end charts ===
Chart (2013)	Position
US Billboard 200	142
US Top Country Albums (Billboard)	34

Chart (2014)	Position
US Billboard 200	176
US Top Country Albums (Billboard)	32

=== Singles ===
Year	Single	Peak chart positions					Certifications (sales threshold)
Year	Single	US Country	US Country Airplay	US	CAN Country	CAN	Certifications (sales threshold)
2013	"Point at You"	10	2	53	6	71	US: Gold
2013	"Lettin' the Night Roll"	7	1	49	4	67	US: Gold
2014	"This Kind of Town"	50	44	—	—	—	
"—" denotes releases that did not chart

== Certifications ==
Region	Certification	Certified units/sales
United States (RIAA)	Gold	364,000
