= Backwoods (song) =

Single by Justin Moore

from the album Justin Moore
- Released: October 19, 2009
- Recorded: 2009
- Genre: Country
- Length: 2:35
- Label: Valory Music Group
- Songwriters: Jaime Paulin; Justin Moore; Jeremy Stover
- Producer: Jeremy Stover

Justin Moore singles chronology
"Small Town USA" (2009)	"Backwoods" (2009)	"How I Got to Be This Way" (2010)

Music video
- Backwoods at CMT.com

"Backwoods" is a song co-written and recorded by American country music artist Justin Moore. It was released in October 2009 as the third single from his self-titled debut album. The song became Moore's second Top 10 hit on the US Billboard Hot Country Songs chart with a peak at number 6 in May 2010.

== Content ==
"Backwoods" is an up-tempo song in which the narrator lists off various contents of his "backwoods" and states he is proud of his "real good life / In the backwoods."

"Backwoods" was co-written by Moore himself, along with the producer of the song and album, Jeremy Stover, and Jamie Paulin. Moore told The Boot that the song was written in about 20 minutes. Moore says, "One of us just started rambling, and the other one started playing the groove of it. Some songs you write and know it's a really good song, then some of them you get into the studio and it comes to life then. This was one of those songs. I liked it when I wrote it, but when we got done doing it in the studio, we both went, 'Man, this has got to go on the album!'"

=== Lawsuit ===
In August 2012, Moore was sued by a songwriter named Bobby Carmichael, who claimed that a song of his was very similar in structure.

== Critical reception ==
The song has received negative reviews from music critics. Kevin John Coyne of Country Universe gave the song a D grade, saying that "empty barrels make the most noise." Juli Thanki of Engine 145 gave the song a "thumbs-down" rating, saying that it "sound[ed] like something stolen from Jason Aldean’s recycle bin."

== Music video ==
Directed by Kristin Barlowe, the music video was released on CMT.com on November 5, 2009. It shows Moore and his band performing the song in a forest at night, with taillights blazing and much smoke, while extras compete in a scavenger hunt, camp out, and just live the backwoods life.

== Chart performance ==
In May 2010, the song reached its peak of No. 6 on the Billboard Hot Country Songs chart.

Chart (2009–2010)	Peak position
Canada Country (Billboard)	30
US Billboard Hot 100	69
US Hot Country Songs (Billboard)	6

=== Year-end charts ===
Chart (2010)	Position
US Country Songs (Billboard)	41

== Certifications ==
Region	Certification	Certified units/sales
United States (RIAA)	Gold	500,000^{‡}
^{‡} Sales+streaming figures based on certification alone.
