= Justin Moore (album) =

Studio album by Justin Moore
- Released: August 11, 2009
- Recorded: 2008–09
- Genres: Country; country rock
- Length: 31:20
- Label: The Valory Music Co.
- Producer: Jeremy Stover

Justin Moore chronology
Justin Moore (2009)	Outlaws Like Me (2011)

Singles from Justin Moore
- 1. "I Could Kick Your Ass" Released: 2008; 2. "Back That Thing Up" Released: July 28, 2008; 3. "Small Town USA" Released: February 10, 2009; 4. "Backwoods" Released: October 19, 2009; 5. "How I Got to Be This Way" Released: June 1, 2010

Justin Moore is the debut studio album by American country music artist Justin Moore. It was released on August 11, 2009 by Valory Music Group, a subsidiary of Big Machine Records. The album includes the singles "I Could Kick Your Ass", "Back That Thing Up", "Small Town USA", "Backwoods" and "How I Got to Be This Way". "Small Town USA" became Moore's first number one hit on the Billboard Hot Country Songs chart in September 2009. Moore co-wrote all but one of the songs on the album.

== History ==
This album was part of a special promotion called "So You Want to Be a Record Label Executive." This promotion placed Moore's music on social networking sites such as MySpace and iLike, where fans could make playlists consisting of ten songs, and the top ten songs that are picked were included on Moore's album.

== Critical reception ==
Professional ratings
Review scores
Source	Rating
AllMusic	2.5/5 stars
Engine 145	3/5 stars
Roughstock	(favorable)

The album received mixed reviews from music critics. Karlie Justus of Engine 145 gave it three stars out of five, saying that Moore "pull[s] off his[...]influences with a country authenticity more capably than any other country up-and-comer at the moment;" she added that many of the other songs seemed to repeat the theme of "Small Town USA," but that "Grandpa", "Like There's No Tomorrow", and "Hank It" "rely on important details that obviously matter." Matt Bjorke of Roughstock gave the album a favorable review, saying that "Moore isn't making a record to not be on the radio, that is his goal, and he wants to bring a heavy dose of southern, country charm and twang back to it." The album received a two-and-a-half star rating from Allmusic critic Stephen Thomas Erlewine, who said that Moore "sees no shame in pandering" and called the album "anonymous country-rock." In 2017, Billboard contributor Chuck Dauphin placed three tracks from the album on his top 10 list of Moore's best songs: "Small Town USA" at number three, "Backwoods" at number five and "Back That Thing Up" at number ten.

== Track listing ==
All tracks are written by Jeremy Stover, with additional co-writers as noted.

No.	Title	Writer(s)	Length
1.	"How I Got to Be This Way"	Justin Moore; Rivers Rutherford	2:58
2.	"Small Town USA"	Brian Dean Maher; Moore	3:38
3.	"Backwoods"	Jamie Paulin; Moore	2:35
4.	"Like There's No Tomorrow"	Moore; Maher	3:28
5.	"Good Ole American Way"	Moore; Maher	2:47
6.	"I Could Kick Your Ass"	Moore; Maher	3:13
7.	"Back That Thing Up"	Randy Houser	2:35
8.	"The Only Place That I Call Home"	Moore; Dallas Davidson	3:23
9.	"Grandpa"	Moore; Paulin	3:27
10.	"Hank It"	Moore; Maher	3:00
Total length:			31:09

== Personnel ==
- Steve Brewster - drums
- Perry Coleman - background vocals
- Larry Franklin - fiddle
- Tommy Harden - drums
- Mike Johnson - steel guitar
- Charlie Judge - keyboards
- Doug Kahan - bass guitar
- Troy Lancaster - electric guitar
- Justin Moore - lead vocals
- Mike Rojas - keyboards
- Steve Sheehan - acoustic guitar, banjo
- Russell Terrell - background vocals

== Chart performance ==
=== Weekly charts ===
Chart (2009–2010)	Peak position
US Billboard 200	10
US Top Country Albums (Billboard)	3

=== Year-end charts ===
Chart (2009)	Position
US Top Country Albums (Billboard)	48
Chart (2010)	Position
US Top Country Albums (Billboard)	40

=== Singles ===
Year	Single	Peak chart positions		Certifications (sales threshold)
Year	Single	US Country	US	Certifications (sales threshold)
2008	"I Could Kick Your Ass"	—	—	
2008	"Back That Thing Up"	38	—	
2009	"Small Town USA"	1	44	* US: Gold
2009	"Backwoods"	6	69	* US: Gold
2010	"How I Got to Be This Way"	17	101	
"—" denotes releases that did not chart

== Certifications ==
Region	Certification	Certified units/sales
United States (RIAA)	Platinum	1,000,000^{^}
^{^} Shipments figures based on certification alone.
