= Til My Last Day =

Single by Justin Moore

from the album Outlaws Like Me
- Released: March 19, 2012
- Genre: Country
- Length: 3:55
- Label: Valory Music Group
- Songwriters: Brian Dean Maher; Justin Moore; Jeremy Stover
- Producer: Jeremy Stover

Justin Moore singles chronology
"Bait a Hook" (2011)	"Til My Last Day" (2012)	"Point at You" (2013)

"Til My Last Day" is a song co-written and recorded by American country music artist Justin Moore. It was released in March 2012 as the third and final single from his second studio album Outlaws Like Me (2011). Moore co-wrote the song with Brian Dean Maher and Jeremy Stover, who also produced the song. It received positive reviews from critics praising the instrumentation and Moore's vocal delivery of the lyrics sounding mature. "Til My Last Day" peaked at number one on the Billboard Country Airplay chart, giving Moore his first number-one hit on that chart and his third country chart topper overall. It also charted at numbers seven and 51 on both the Hot Country Songs and Hot 100 charts respectively. The song was certified Gold by the Recording Industry Association of America (RIAA), denoting sales of over half-a-million units in that country. Its chart success in Canada was similarly received, peaking at number eight on the Country chart and number 76 on the Canadian Hot 100. Two music videos were released to accompany the song: a live version directed by Justin Nolan Key that features Moore's wife and kids, and a second one directed by Peter Zavadil that features a young married couple attempting to make things work.

== Critical reception ==
Billy Dukes of Taste of Country gave the song four and a half stars out of five, writing that "the crying electric guitars between the verses add pathos to a story that hooks you from the very first moments." Bobby Peacock of Roughstock gave the song four stars out of five, saying that "Moore sings it more convincingly and strongly than anything else in his catalog, a newfound level of maturity underscoring his twangy tenor." In 2017, Billboard contributor Chuck Dauphin put "Til My Last Day" at number six on his top 10 list of Moore's best songs.

== Commercial performance ==
"Til My Last Day" debuted at number 57 on the Billboard Hot Country Songs chart for the week of March 31, 2012. It reached number seven the week of December 22, and stayed on the chart for 45 weeks. On the Country Airplay chart dated January 5, 2013, "Til My Last Day" became Moore's first number-one country hit on that chart, and his third overall. It stayed on the chart for 44 weeks. On the Billboard Hot 100, it debuted at number 98 for the week of September 29, 2012. Twelve weeks later, it peaked at number 51 the week of December 22, and remained on the chart for twenty weeks. It was certified gold by the RIAA on May 28, 2013. In Canada, the track debuted at number 91 on the Canadian Hot 100 the week of December 29, 2012 and stayed there for two consecutive weeks. It peaked at number 76 the week of January 26, 2013, and stayed on the chart for six weeks.

== Music videos ==
A live music video, directed by Justin Nolan Key, premiered in April 2012. It features footage of Moore's wife and kids. A second music video, directed by Peter Zavadil, premiered in August 2012. It depicts a young married couple trying to make ends meet. The protagonist often disappears with his friends for most of the day, drawing his wife's suspicions when they show up with coolers full of beer. It turns out that they are all building a brand new house to surprise his wife.

== Chart performance ==
Chart (2012–2013)	Peak position
Canada Hot 100 (Billboard)	76
Canada Country (Billboard)	8
US Billboard Hot 100	51
US Hot Country Songs (Billboard)	7
US Country Airplay (Billboard)	1

=== Year-end charts ===
Chart (2012)	Position
US Hot Country Songs (Billboard)	52

Chart (2013)	Position
US Country Airplay (Billboard)	56
US Hot Country Songs (Billboard)	65

== Certifications ==
Region	Certification	Certified units/sales
United States (RIAA)	Gold	500,000^{^}
^{^} Shipments figures based on certification alone.
