= Back That Thing Up =

Single by Justin Moore

from the album Justin Moore
- Released: July 23, 2008
- Genre: Country
- Length: 2:35
- Label: Valory Music Group
- Songwriters: Jeremy Stover; Randy Houser
- Producer: Jeremy Stover

Justin Moore singles chronology
| "I Could Kick Your Ass" (2008) | "Back That Thing Up" (2008) | "Small Town USA" (2009) |

"Back That Thing Up" is a song written by Jeremy Stover and Randy Houser, and recorded by American country music artist Justin Moore. It was released in July 2008 as Moore's second single from his self-titled debut album, and the only track from the album that Moore did not co-write. The song peaked at number 38 on the US Billboard Hot Country Songs chart.

== Content ==
This song uses elements of country rap and country rock as well as sexual innuendo to describe a girl handling equipment on a farm (e.g. "Throw it in reverse, let Daddy load it up").

== Critical reception ==
It got a "thumbs up" review from The 9513's Jim Malec, who noted that the lyrics "separated (at least semantically) the inherent innuendo from the song's story itself as in the final verse, he negates the song's innuendo by singing the lyric 'Ain't no time to play'." Kevin John Coyne of Country Universe gave the song a B− grade, stating that he would be "lying if [he] said [he] wasn't disappointed that this isn't a countrified version of the Juvenile hit. Alas, it's just a hillbilly rave-up that finds a country boy trying to get a city girl used to farm life, using backing up a truck as an awkward sexual metaphor" and that Moore "throws himself fully into the lyric like he was Joe Diffie singing a mid-1990s novelty number". In 2017, Billboard contributor Chuck Dauphin put "Back That Thing Up" at number ten on his top 10 list of Moore's best songs.

== Music video ==
The music video was directed by Wes Edwards and premiered in June 2009.

== Chart performance ==
This song debuted at number 55 on the Billboard Hot Country Songs chart for the week of August 23, 2008.

| Chart (2008) | Peak position |
|---|---|
| US Hot Country Songs (Billboard) | 38 |
