= Randy Montana =

American musician

- Birth name: Randy Schlappi
- Born: September 23, 1985 (age 39)
- Origin: Albany, New York, U.S.
- Genres: Country
- Occupation: Singer-songwriter
- Instrument: Vocals
- Years active: 2009 – present
- Labels: Mercury Nashville

Randy Schlappi (born September 23, 1985), known professionally as Randy Montana, is an American country singer signed to Mercury Records Nashville. His first album, Randy Montana, was released in 2011.

== Early and personal life ==
Randy Schlappi is the son of singer-songwriter Billy Montana.

He is married to Montgomery "Gummy" Lee, daughter of retired stock car racer Kyle Petty, and granddaughter of Richard Petty. The couple have one daughter and two sons.

== Musical career ==
In March 2010, Montana released his debut single "Ain't Much Left of Lovin' You," to radio. The song entered at No. 59 on the Billboard Hot Country Songs charts dated for the week ending April 3, 2010. His self-titled album's second single "1,000 Faces" released to country radio on 2011.

Karlie Justus of Engine 145 gave "Ain't Much Left of Lovin' You" a thumbs-up, calling Montana's voice "raspy" and comparing the song's theme to George Jones's "The Grand Tour." Matt Bjorke of Roughstock rated it three-and-a-half stars out of five, saying that the song is a "grow-on-you type" but that it "really feels like a genuine and proper introduction."

=== Concert Tours ===
- Own The Night Tour with Lady Antebellum (2011)

== Discography ==
=== Studio albums ===
Title	Details	Peak chart positions	
Title	Details	US Country	US Heat
Randy Montana	Release date: July 26, 2011; Label: Mercury Nashville; Formats: CD, music download	43	7

=== Extended plays ===
Title	Details
1,000 Faces	Release date: January 4, 2011; Label: Mercury Nashville; Formats: CD, music download
Put Me in a Box	Release date: November 18, 2014; Label: 12 Points Records; Formats: Music download

=== Singles ===
Year	Single	Peak positions	Album
Year	Single	US Country	Album
2010	"Ain't Much Left of Lovin' You"	36	Randy Montana
2011	"1,000 Faces"	37	Randy Montana

=== Music videos ===
Year	Video	Director
2010	"Ain't Much Left of Lovin' You"	Shaun Silva
2011	"1,000 Faces"	Deaton Flanigen
