= Jeremy Stover =

American songwriter and record producer

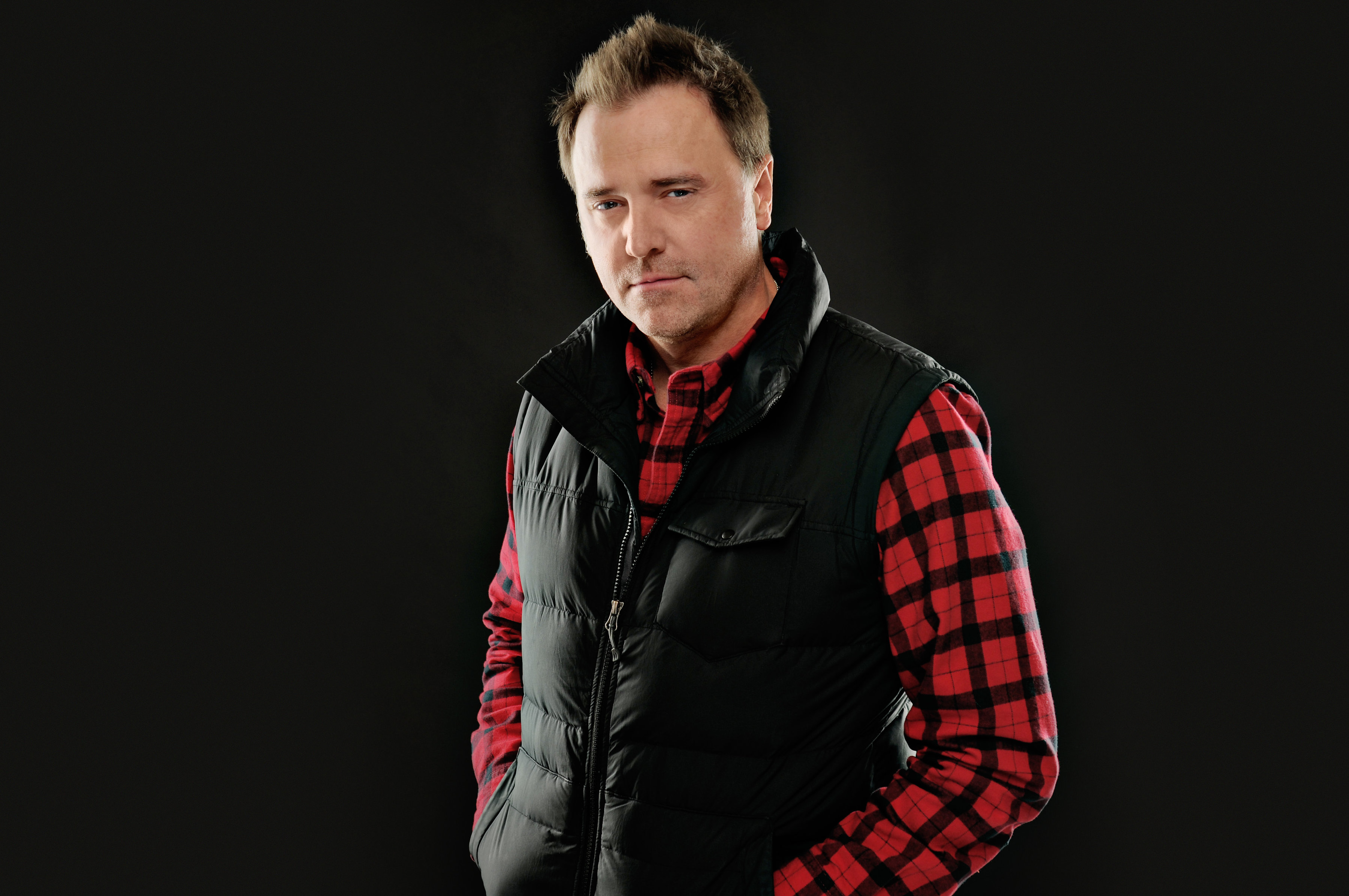

Background information
- Born: Jeremy Stover; August 20, 1972 (age 54); Ellijay, Georgia, U.S.
- Origin: Nashville, Tennessee
- Genre: Country
- Occupations: Songwriter, record producer
- Years active: 2000–present

Jeremy Stover (born August 20, 1972) is an American country music songwriter and record producer. Stover is an alumnus of Belmont University. Stover has written singles for Tim McGraw, Jon Pardi, Wynonna, Martina McBride, and others.

His first number 1 single as a songwriter was "Wherever You Are", recorded by Jack Ingram, which was also the first number 1 single for Big Machine Records.

Stover is best known for his work with Justin Moore, whom he helped sign with Big Machine's Valory imprint. He co-wrote and produced Moore's number 1 single "Small Town USA".

Stover was one of three writers for the song, Scarecrow, released by LJ Music on July 12, 2019.

In 2014, Stover founded independent music publisher RED Creative Group. In 2018, the company expanded with the launch of RED Creative Management in partnership with Red Light Management.

== Songs written by Jeremy Stover ==
Year	Artist	Album	Song	Co-writer
2002	Emerson Drive	Emerson Drive	"Fall into Me"	Danny Orton
2002	Sixwire	Sixwire	"Broken"	Steve Mandile
2003	Clay Walker	A Few Questions	"Sweet Sun Angel"	Greg Barnhill, Kris Bergsnes
2003	Jimmy Wayne	Jimmy Wayne	"Blue and Brown"	Jimmy Wayne
2003	Sara Evans	Restless	"Restless"	Willie Mack
2003	Wynona Judd	What the World Needs Now is Love	"Your Day Will Come"	Stephony Smith
2004	Emerson Drive	What If?	"You're Like Comin' Home"	Brandon Kinney, Brian Dean Maher
2004	Rachel Proctor	Right Where I Belong	"I'm Gonna Get You Back"	Rachel Proctor
2004	Rachel Proctor	Right Where I Belong	"We Did it Our Way"	Rachel Proctor
2005	Lonestar	Coming Home	"You're Like Comin' Home"	Brandon Kinney, Brian Dean Maher
2005	Lonestar	Coming Home	"I'll Die Tryin'"	Steve Bogard
2006	Danielle Peck	Danielle Peck	"Findin' a Good Man"	Casey Koesel, Brian Dean Maher
2006	Danielle Peck	Danielle Peck	"Somebody for You"	Danielle Peck
2006	Emerson Drive	Countrified	"Everyday Woman"	Brian Maher
2006	Jack Ingram	Live: Wherever You Are	"Wherever You Are"	Steve Bogard
2006	Rebecca Lindsey	Headlights on the Highway	"Cry Me a River"	Lisa Drew, Morgane Hayes
2006	Shane Yellowbird	Life is Calling My Name	"Drive Me Home"	Willie Mack, Brandon Kinney
2007	Jack Ingram	This Is It	"Maybe She'll Get Lonely"	John Kennedy, Jamie Paulin
2007	Martina McBride	Waking Up Laughing	"Trying to Find a Reason"	Tommy Lee James
2008	The Lost Trailers	Holler Back	"How 'Bout You Don't"	Geoffrey Nielson, Stokes Nielson, Vicky McGehee, Ryder Lee
2009	Justin Moore	Justin Moore	"Small Town USA"	Brian Dean Maher, Justin Moore
2009	Justin Moore	Justin Moore	"Backwoods"	Jamie Paulin, Justin Moore
2009	Justin Moore	Justin Moore	"Good Ole American Way"	Brian Dean Maher, Justin Moore
2009	Justin Moore	Justin Moore	"Back That Thing Up"	Randy Houser
2009	Justin Moore	Justin Moore	"The Only Place That I Call Home"	Dallas Davidson, Justin Moore
2009	Justin Moore	Justin Moore	"Grandpa"	Jamie Paulin, Justin Moore
2009	Justin Moore	Justin Moore	"Hank It"	Justin Moore, Brian Dean Maher
2010	Colt Ford, Randy Houser	Chicken And Biscuits	"Hey Y'all"	Jonathan Lawhorn, Tyler Farr
2010	Sarah Buxton	Sarah Buxton	"Innocence"	Sarah Buxton, Dave Berg, Georgia Middleman
2011	Hunter Hayes	Hunter Hayes	"More Than I Should"	Hunter Hayes, Rivers Rutherford
2011	Justin Moore	Outlaws Like Me	"Til My Last Day"	Brian Dean Maher, Justin Moore
2011	Justin Moore	Outlaws Like Me	"Bait a Hook"	Justin Moore, Rhett Akins
2011	Justin Moore	Outlaws Like Me	"Redneck Side"	Kris Bergsnes, Rick Giles
2011	Justin Moore	Outlaws Like Me	"My Kind of Woman"	Brian Dean Maher, Justin Moore
2011	Justin Moore	Outlaws Like Me	"Beer Time"	Justin Moore, Rhett Akins
2011	Justin Moore	Outlaws Like Me	"Flyin' Down a Back Road"	Jamie Paulin, Justin Moore
2011	Justin Moore	Outlaws Like Me	"If You Don't Like My Twang"	Justin Moore, Rhett Akins
2011	Justin Moore	Outlaws Like Me	"Guns"	Jamie Paulin, Justin Moore
2011	Justin Moore	Outlaws Like Me	"Sunshine Babies"	Justin Moore, Rhett Akins
2011	Justin Moore	Outlaws Like Me	"Bed of My Chevy"	Justin Moore
2011	Justin Moore	Outlaws Like Me	"Outlaws Like Me"	Justin Moore
2011	Scotty McCreery	Clear as Day	"Write My Number on Your Hand"	Jamie Paulin, Thomas Rhett
2011	The Janedear Girls	The Janedear Girls	"Wildflower"	Susan Brown, Vicky McGehee
2013	Drake White	The Simple Life	"The Simple Life"	Brian Dean Maher, Drake White
2013	Jake Owen	Days of Gold	"Sure Feels Right"	Jaren Johnston, Zac Maloy
2013	JJ Lawhorn	Original Good Ol' Boy	"You Don't Know Me Very Well"	JJ Lawhorn, Dallas Davidson
2013	JJ Lawhorn	Original Good Ol' Boy	"You Can Tell a Man By His Truck"	JJ Lawhorn, Ben Hayslip
2013	JJ Lawhorn	Original Good Ol' Boy	"When She Puts on Them Jeans"	JJ Lawhorn, Brandon Kinney
2013	JJ Lawhorn	Original Good Ol' Boy	"She Kissed Me Anyway"	JJ Lawhorn, Ben Hayslip
2013	JJ Lawhorn	Original Good Ol' Boy	"It's Too Late Now"	JJ Lawhorn, Rhett Akins
2013	Justin Moore	Off the Beaten Path	"Lettin' the Night Roll"	Justin Moore, Rodney Clawson
2013	Justin Moore	Off the Beaten Path	"Beer"	Brandon Kinney, Justin Moore
2013	Justin Moore	Off the Beaten Path	"Wheels"	Brian Maher, Justin Moore
2013	Justin Moore	Off the Beaten Path	"I'd Want It to Be Yours"	Brandon Kinney, Justin Moore
2013	Justin Moore	Off the Beaten Path	"Dirt Road Kid"	Brett Jones
2013	Justin Moore	Off the Beaten Path	"Country Radio"	David Lee Murphy, Justin Moore
2013	Justin Moore	Off the Beaten Path	"One Dirt Road"	Jamie Paulin, Justin Moore
2013	Justin Moore	Off the Beaten Path	"Off the Beaten Path"	Brandon Kinney, Chris Janson
2013	Justin Moore	Off the Beaten Path	"Big Ass Headache"	Brandon Kinney, Justin Moore
2013	Justin Moore	Off the Beaten Path	"For Some Ol' Redneck Reason"	Justin Moore, Rhett Akins
2014	Cole Swindell	Cole Swindell	"Get Up"	Brandon Kinney, Cole Swindell
2015	Chris Young	I'm Comin' Over	"Sunshine Overtime"	Chris Young, Corey Crowder
2015	Dallas Smith	Kids With Cars	"Lifted"	Jaren Johnston, Zac Maloy
2015	Easton Corbin	About to Get Real	"About to Get Real"	Ben Hayslip, Rhett Akins
2015	Eli Young Band	Turn It On	"Plastic"	Ashley Gorley, Mike Eli, Ross Copperman
2015	Jordan Rager	Feels Like One of Them	"Feels Like One of Them"	Jaron Caleb Boyer
2015	Tim McGraw	Damn Country Music	"How I'll Always Be"	Chris Janson, Jamie Paulin
2016	Adam Craig	Adam Craig	"Reckon"	Randy Montana, Derek George
2016	Dallas Smith	Side Effects	"Only One You"	Jaren Johnston, Neil Mason
2016	Frankie Ballard	El Río	"It All Started with a Beer"	Jaren Johnston, Neil Mason
2016	Jon Pardi	California Sunrise	"Can't Turn You Down"	Randy Montana, Corey Crowder
2016	Justin Moore	Kinda Don't Care	"Goobye Back"	Justin Moore, Ross Copperman
2016	Justin Moore	Kinda Don't Care	"Got It Good"	Jaren Johnston, Neil Mason
2016	Justin Moore	Kinda Don't Care	"When I Get Home"	Dean Dillon, Justin Moore
2016	LOCASH	The Fighters	"I Know Somebody"	Rhett Akins, Ross Copperman
2016	Ronnie Dunn	Tattoed Heart	"Young Buck"	Jaren Johnston
2017	Ben Gallaher	Ben Gallaher	"Against the World"	Ben Gallaher, Lance Miller
2017	Chris Janson	EVERYBODY	"Eyes for Nobody"	Chris Janson
2018	Meghan Patrick	Country Music Made Me Do It	"Country Music Made Me Do It"	Dan Isbell, Meghan Sylvia Patrick
2019	Justin Moore	Late Nights and Longnecks	"Why We Drink"	Casey Beathard, David Lee Murphy, Justin Moore
2019	Justin Moore	Late Nights and Longnecks	"On the Rocks"	Chase McGill, Justin Moore, Paul DiGiovanni
2019	Justin Moore	Late Nights and Longnecks	"Jesus and Jack Daniels"	Chase McGill, Justin Moore, Paul DiGiovanni
2019	Justin Moore	Late Nights and Longnecks	"Someday I Gotta Quit"	Casey Beathard, Justin Moore, Paul DiGiovanni
2019	Justin Moore	Late Nights and Longnecks	"Airport Bar"	Casey Beathard, Justin Moore, Paul DiGiovanni
2019	Justin Moore	Late Nights and Longnecks	"Good Times Don't"	Chase McGill, Justin Moore, Paul DiGiovanni
2019	Justin Moore	Late Nights and Longnecks	"Never Gonna Drink Again"	Justin Moore, Paul DiGiovanni, Rhett Akins
2019	Justin Moore	Late Nights and Longnecks	"Small Town Street Cred"	Chase McGill, Justin Moore, Paul DiGiovanni
2019	Justin Moore	Late Nights and Longnecks	"The Ones That Didn't Make It Back Home"	Chase McGill, Justin Moore, Paul DiGiovanni
2019	Justin Moore	Late Nights and Longnecks	"That's My Boy"	Casey Beathard, Justin Moore
2019	LOCASH	Brothers	"Beers to Catch Up On"	Paul DiGiovanni, Rhett Akins
2019	Montgomery Gentry	Outskirts	"Joe Six-Pack"	Jesse Frasure, Travis Denning
2020	The Cadillac Three	Country Fuzz	"Hard Out Here for a Country Boy"	Jaren Johnston, Neil Mason
2020	The Cadillac Three	Country Fuzz	"Dirt Road Nights"	Jaren Johnston, Neil Mason
2020	Travis Denning	Beer's Better Cold	"Where's That Beer Been"	Chris Stevens, Rhett Akins, Travis Denning
2020	Travis Denning	Beer's Better Cold	"Sittin' By a Fire"	Rhett Akins, Travis Denning
2021	Justin Moore	Straight Outta the Country	"Consecutive Days Alive"	Casey Beathard, Monty Criswell
2021	Justin Moore	Straight Outta the Country	"We Didn't Have Much"	Paul DiGiovanni, Randy Montana
2021	Justin Moore	Straight Outta the Country	"She Ain’t Mine No More"	Justin Moore, Paul DiGiovanni, Jamie Paulin
2021	Justin Moore	Straight Outta the Country	"More Than Me"	Justin Moore, Paul DiGiovanni, Chase McGill, Jamie Paulin
2021	Noah Hicks	I Can Tell You're Small Town	"No More of 'Em"	Noah Hicks, Rhett Akins, Will Bundy
2021	Noah Hicks	I Can Tell You're Small Town	"Miss You Back"	Paul DiGiovanni, Cole Taylor, Noah Hicks
2021	Noah Hicks	I Can Tell You're Small Town	"Drinkin' in a College Town"	Paul DiGiovanni, Cole Taylor, Noah Hicks
2022	Travis Denning	Might As Well Be Me	"River Named Mississippi"	Chris Stevens, Cole Taylor, Travis Denning
2022	Travis Denning	Might As Well Be Me	"Buy a Girl a Drink"	Travis Denning, Paul DiGiovanni, Chase McGill
2023	Ashley McBryde	The Devil I Know	"The Devil I Know"	Ashley McBryde, Bobby Pinson
2023	Justin Moore	Stray Dog	"Everybody Get Along"	Justin Moore, David Lee Murphy
2023	Justin Moore	Stray Dog	"That Wasn't Jack"	Justin Moore, David Lee Murphy, Chris Stevens
2023	Justin Moore	Stray Dog	"With a Woman You Love"	Justin Moore, Chase McGill, Paul DiGiovanni
2023	Justin Moore	Stray Dog	"Better Slow"	Justin Moore, Paul DiGiovanni, Randy Montana
2023	Justin Moore	Stray Dog	"Stray Dogs"	Justin Moore, Paul DiGiovanni, Randy Montana
2023	Justin Moore	Stray Dog	"Country on It"	Justin Moore, Paul DiGiovanni, Casey Beathard
2023	Justin Moore	Stray Dog	"Get Rich or Drunk Trying"	Justin Moore, Paul DiGiovanni, Casey Beathard
2023	Tim McGraw	Standing Room Only	"Small Town King"	Jaren Johnston, Jenn Schott
2023	Noah Hicks	TBA	"Red Clay Summer"	Paul DiGiovanni, Cole Taylor, Noah Hicks
2024	Travis Denning	Roads That Go Nowhere	"Going Places"	Matt Mulhare, Paul DiGiovanni, Travis Denning
2024	Travis Denning	Roads That Go Nowhere	"Add Her to the List"	Paul DiGiovanni, Bobby Pinson
2024	Travis Denning	Roads That Go Nowhere	"Can't Find One"	Chris Stevens, Chase McGill, Travis Denning
2024	Luke Combs	Fathers & Sons	"Ride Around Heaven"	Luke Combs, Casey Beathard, Wyatt McCubbin
2024	Noah Hicks	TBA	"Second Time Around"	Jessi Alexander, Noah Hicks, Zach Abend
2024	Justin Moore	This Is My Dirt	"This Is My Dirt"	Justin Moore, Paul DiGiovanni, Randy Montana
2024	Justin Moore	This Is My Dirt	"Put a Boot in It"	Justin Moore, Will Bundy, Randy Montana
2024	Justin Moore	This Is My Dirt	"The Worst"	Justin Moore, Chase McGill
2024	Justin Moore	This Is My Dirt	"Glad to Be Here"	Justin Moore, Paul DiGiovanni, Randy Montana
2024	Justin Moore	This Is My Dirt	"Love Your Hometown"	Justin Moore, Will Bundy, Randy Montana
2024	Justin Moore	This Is My Dirt	"Beer Ain't One"	Justin Moore, Casey Beathard, Will Bundy, Joe London
2024	Justin Moore	This Is My Dirt	"The Getting By"	Justin Moore, Paul DiGiovanni, Randy Montana
2024	Justin Moore	This Is My Dirt	"Redneck Love"	Justin Moore, Will Bundy, Paul DiGiovanni, Randy Montana
2024	Justin Moore	This Is My Dirt	"F Word"	Justin Moore, Paul DiGiovanni, Chase McGill
2024	Justin Moore	This Is My Dirt	"Never Left Me"	Justin Moore, Casey Beathard, Will Bundy
2024	Justin Moore	This Is My Dirt	"You Know It's Coming"	Justin Moore, Chase McGill
2024	Cody Johnson	Leather Deluxe Edition	"The Fall"	Bobby Pinson, Ray Fulcher
2024	Noah Hicks	TBA	"Door's Unlocked"	Paul DiGiovanni, Cole Taylor, Noah Hicks
