= Scott Borchetta =

American record executive (born 1962)

- Born: July 3, 1962 (age 63); Burbank, California, U.S.
- Other name: Scott C. Borchetta
- Occupations: Record executive, entrepreneur, racing driver
- Known for: Big Machine Label Group

Signature
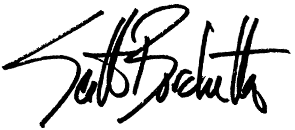

Scott Borchetta (born July 3, 1962) is an American record executive and founder of the Big Machine Label Group. He started the label in 2005 with Taylor Swift as its first signed artist and 13 employees. He served as its president/CEO, encompassing four imprints: Big Machine Records, Nashville Harbor Records & Entertainment, The Valory Music Co. and Nash Icon Records. In 2015, he became an in-house mentor on American Idol in the program's 14th and 15th seasons. He is also a sports car racing driver in the Trans-Am Series and owner of NASCAR Xfinity Series team Big Machine Racing.

Before Big Machine, Borchetta was a race car driver and executive at the Nashville divisions of DreamWorks Records and MCA Records as well as MTM Records.

== Early life ==
Borchetta was born in Burbank, California to parents Shari and Mike Borchetta. He grew up in the San Fernando Valley of Southern California in the 1970s. His father, Mike Borchetta, worked in record promotions for several Los Angeles record labels, including Capitol Records, RCA Records and Mercury Records. In 1978, when Borchetta was 16, his father moved to Nashville to start his own independent record promotion company.

== Career ==
=== Early career ===
Interested in life beyond Los Angeles, Borchetta began to pursue a career in music. After playing in several rock bands, he left California and moved to Nashville with his father. There, Borchetta played bass in a country band and spent his days working in his father's mail room promoting country singles. After 8 months on the road, he left his band since they were not finding success. While working with his father, Borchetta learned about the music industry and how it operates, and used this knowledge to pursue jobs at record labels. In 1985, he got a job at MTM Records, where he stayed for three years. He then spent two years working as an independent promoter before working in promotion and artist development at several other record labels, including MCA Nashville Records, DreamWorks Nashville and Universal Music Nashville.

=== Big Machine Label Group ===
In 2005, Borchetta left Universal Music Nashville to start his own independent record label, Big Machine Records. Borchetta disagreed with how major labels ran their business, and felt that he and his friend Neil Adams could run his own label more efficiently than what he had seen.

Borchetta signed his first artist, singer-songwriter Taylor Swift (whom he had met in 2004) when she was 14 years old. Swift went on to become Big Machine's most successful artist and win the label two Grammy Awards for Album of the Year for the albums Fearless at the 2010 Grammy Awards and 1989 at the 2016 Grammy Awards.

On June 30, 2019, Ithaca Holdings, run by Scooter Braun, bought Big Machine Records, with Borchetta staying on as CEO. This transaction included the masters of Swift's first six albums. Swift voiced her frustrations in a Tumblr post, saying she had been trying to buy the masters for years and described Braun as an "incessant, manipulative bully". Swift also said Borchetta's loyalty was only through contracts, and that he knew "exactly what he was doing" when making this deal with Ithaca Holdings. Swift expressed that these men were "controlling a woman who did not want to be associated with them". The dispute escalated throughout the year, both parties claiming to be owed millions of dollars from the other. Swift accused Braun and Borchetta of holding her back from being able to perform her older songs during her American Music Awards for her Artist of the Decade award, as well as for her Netflix documentary, Miss Americana. On the same day Swift posted on her Tumblr account, Borchetta went on Big Machine Records and posted his own statement. He said he forewarned Swift through text the night before. "Taylor and I remained on very good terms when she told me she wanted to speak with other record companies and see what was out there for her. I never got in her way and wished her well." He said that she had the opportunity to own not just her recordings, but everything else.

=== Television work ===
In its 14th season, Borchetta became the senior mentor of the reality music competition American Idol.

In February 2017, Canadian media company Bell Media announced that it had partnered with Borchetta to develop a new, international television format that would "uncover, develop, and promote pop culture's next musical superstars". The new series, The Launch, premiered in January 2018, with Borchetta as executive producer.

=== Racing ===
In his youth, Borchetta competed in motocross and quarter midget racing in Southern California. He has said in an interview that he became interested in racing after attending the 1970 California 500. After a dormancy as he focused on music, he began racing legends cars in 1995 at Nashville Fairgrounds Speedway as part of the Summer Legends Shootout Series founded by country music group Brooks & Dunn. In 1999, he moved to the NASCAR SuperTruck Weekly Series and won three consecutive championships from 2003 to 2005, and also raced in the Valvoline Cup Truck Series. He was inducted into the Nashville Fairgrounds Speedway Hall of Fame in 2020; his SuperTruck crew chief James Buttrey was enshrined a year later. In March 2021, Borchetta was named executive advisor to the Hall of Fame.

Borchetta befriended NASCAR crew chief Ray Evernham while filming a 2014 episode of Evernham's television series AmeriCarna, and Evernham invited him to drive a 1972 Chevrolet Corvette in the Sportscar Vintage Racing Association. He won the SVRA Group 6 national championship in 2020.

In June 2020, Borchetta debuted in the Trans-Am Series TA2 class at Mid-Ohio Sports Car Course. A year later, when Trans-Am joined the IndyCar Series at the new Music City Grand Prix in Nashville, Big Machine Records assumed naming rights of the weekend while Borchetta entered the Trans-Am support event. Borchetta acts as the chief promoter of the event, which moved to the Nashville Superspeedway from 2024 onwards after development eliminated the downtown-Nashville street circuit.

Big Machine Racing, a NASCAR O'Reilly Auto Parts Series team owned by Borchetta, began competing in 2021 with Jade Buford as the driver for 32 of the 33 races, with Danny Bohn running the other. In 2022, Borchetta fielded his car for a variety of drivers, these being Marco Andretti, Jade Buford, Ross Chastain, Austin Dillon, Ty Dillon, Kaz Grala, Parker Kligerman, Tyler Reddick, Nick Sanchez, and Ricky Stenhouse Jr.
