= Crushin' It World Tour =

2015–16 concert tour by Brad Paisley

- Tour by Brad Paisley
- Promotional poster for the tour
- Associated album: Moonshine in the Trunk
- Start date: May 15, 2015
- End date: March 12, 2016
- Legs: 2
- No. of shows: 55
- Box office: $19.4 million

Brad Paisley concert chronology
- Country Nation World Tour (2014–15); Crushin' It World Tour (2015–16); Life Amplified World Tour (2016–17)

The Crushin' It World Tour was the tenth headlining concert tour by American country music singer Brad Paisley and is in support of his tenth studio album Moonshine in the Trunk (2014). It began on May 15, 2015, in Camden, New Jersey and finished on March 12, 2016, in Bloomington, Illinois. The tour played through amphitheaters and festivals across the United States and Canada.

== Background ==
The tour was first announced in February 2015, through Paisley's website. Opening up for Paisley for most of the dates were Justin Moore and Mickey Guyton. Inspiration for the tour's name comes from Paisley's current single, "Crushin' It". Dates for the second leg were announced on October 20, 2015.

== Concert synopsis ==
The show began with a thirty-second countdown clock to "happy hour", then Paisley emerges on stage. During "Time Warp", Paisley invited a young a fan to come on stage and play Mario Kart, which was shown on the video screen. For the first leg of the show Paisley sang "I'm Still a Guy" with Justin Moore and "Whiskey Lullaby" with Micky Guyton, then closed the show with both first-leg opening acts during "Alcohol".

=== Stage production ===
The stage was two levels; back behind was sixty-foot video screen, and in the middle of the audience was B-stage. Also on stage is a functioning bar where VIP fans and contest winners can sit during the show.

== Opening acts ==
- Justin Moore
- Mickey Guyton
- Dustin Lynch
- Cassadee Pope
- Ashley Monroe
- RaeLynn
- Eric Paslay
- Cam

== Setlist ==
Mickey Guyton
1. "Forever Love"
2. "Somebody Else Will"
3. "Why Baby Why"
4. "Pretty Little Mustang"
5. "Cool Ya"
6. "Blame It on Your Heart" (Patty Loveless cover)
7. "Better Than You Left Me"
Justin Moore
1. "Point at You"
2. "How I Got to Be This Way"
3. "Til My Last Day"
4. "Bait a Hook"
5. "If Heaven Wasn't So Far Away"
6. "Small Town Throwdown" (Brantley Gilbert cover)
7. "Lettin' the Night Roll"
8. "Backwoods"
9. "Small Town USA"
Brad Paisley Setlist I

This is a representation of the Camden, New Jersey show.

1. "River Bank"
2. "Water"
3. "Moonshine in the Trunk"
4. "Celebrity"
5. "I'm Still a Guy" (performed with Justin Moore)
6. "This Is Country Music"
7. "Beat This Summer"
8. "Perfect Storm"
9. "American Saturday Night"
10. "Whiskey Lullaby" (performed with Mickey Guyton)
11. "Time Warp"
12. "Ticks"
13. "Old Alabama" (with virtual Alabama)
  B-Stage
14. "She's Everything"
  Main stage
15. "Southern Comfort Zone"
16. "Mud on the Tires"
17. "I'm Gonna Miss Her (The Fishin' Song)"
18. "Crushin' It"
  Encore
19. "Then"
20. "Alcohol" (performed with Justin Moore & Mickey Guyton)
Brad Paisley Setlist II

This is a representation on the Syracuse, New York show.

1. "River Bank"
2. "Water"
3. "Moonshine in the Trunk"
4. "Celebrity"
5. "Country Nation"
6. "This Is Country Music"
7. "I'm Still a Guy"
8. "She's Everything"
9. "Ticks"
10. "American Saturday Night"
11. "Whiskey Lullaby"
12. "Beat This Summer"
13. "Perfect Storm"
14. "Old Alabama"
15. "Waitin' on a Woman"
16. "Remind Me"
17. "Southern Comfort Zone"
18. "I'm Gonna Miss Her (The Fishin' Song)"
19. "Crushin' It"
20. "Mud on the Tires"
  Encore
21. "Online"
22. "Then"
23. "Alcohol"

== Tour dates ==
| Date | City | Country | Venue | Opening acts | Attendance | Gross revenue |
North America leg #1
| May 15, 2015 | Camden | United States | Susquehanna Bank Center | Justin Moore; Mickey Guyton | 21,789 / 24,000 | $674,447 |
| May 16, 2015 | Raleigh | United States | Walnut Creek Amphitheatre | Justin Moore; Mickey Guyton | 18,967 / 18,967 | $501,669 |
| May 30, 2015 | Salem | United States | Salem Stadium | —N/a | —N/a | —N/a |
| May 31, 2015 | Charlotte | United States | PNC Music Pavilion | Justin Moore; Mickey Guyton | 13,995 / 19,000 | $439,558 |
| June 4, 2015 | Phoenix | United States | Ak-Chin Pavilion | Justin Moore; Mickey Guyton | 14,967 / 19,000 | $468,559 |
| June 5, 2015 | Los Angeles | United States | Hollywood Bowl | Justin Moore; Mickey Guyton | —N/a | —N/a |
| June 6, 2015 | Chula Vista | United States | Sleep Train Amphitheatre | Justin Moore; Mickey Guyton | 15,996 / 19,000 | $549,338 |
| June 11, 2015 | Lake Tahoe | United States | Harveys Outdoor Arena | Justin Moore; Mickey Guyton | —N/a | —N/a |
| June 12, 2015 | Wheatland | United States | Toyota Amphitheatre | Justin Moore; Mickey Guyton | 14,224 / 19,000 | $438,669 |
| June 13, 2015 | Mountain View | United States | Shoreline Amphitheatre | Justin Moore; Mickey Guyton | 17,997 / 21,000 | $548,447 |
| June 26, 2015 | Burgettstown | United States | First Niagara Pavilion | Justin Moore; Mickey Guyton | —N/a | —N/a |
| June 27, 2015 | New York City | United States | Randall's Island | Dustin Lynch; Cassadee Pope; Ashley Monroe; RaeLynn | —N/a | —N/a |
| June 28, 2015 | Darien Center | United States | Darien Lake PAC | Justin Moore; Mickey Guyton | 14,598 / 19,000 | $489,449 |
| July 16, 2015 | West Valley City | United States | USANA Amphitheatre | Justin Moore; Mickey Guyton | —N/a | —N/a |
| July 17, 2015 | Cuyahoga Falls | United States | Blossom Music Center | Justin Moore; Mickey Guyton | 19,130 / 20,000 | $608,258 |
| July 18, 2015 ^{[A]} | Brooklyn | United States | Faster Horses Festival | —N/a | —N/a | —N/a |
| July 24, 2015 | Bethel | United States | Bethel Woods Center for the Arts | Justin Moore; Mickey Guyton | 13,978 / 17,000 | $439,419 |
| July 25, 2015 | Hartford | United States | Xfinity Theatre | Justin Moore; Mickey Guyton | 17,821 / 21,000 | $591,494 |
| July 26, 2015 | Saratoga Springs | United States | Saratoga Performing Arts Center | Justin Moore; Mickey Guyton | 18,445 / 21,000 | $614,337 |
| July 31, 2015 ^{[B]} | Mountain Home | United States | Mountain Home Country Music Festival | —N/a | —N/a | —N/a |
| August 1, 2015 | Camrose | Canada | Camrose Regional Exhibition | —N/a | —N/a | —N/a |
| August 7, 2015 ^{[C]} | Oro-Medonte | Canada | Boots & Hearts Music Festival | —N/a | —N/a | —N/a |
| August 9, 2015 | Gilford | United States | Bank of New Hampshire Pavilion | Justin Moore; Mickey Guyton | 5,392 / 6,835 | $337,237 |
| August 21, 2015 ^{[D]} | Gardendale | United States | Texas Thunder Country Music Festival | —N/a | —N/a | —N/a |
| August 22, 2015 | Thackerville | United States | WinStar World Casino | Justin Moore; Mickey Guyton | —N/a | —N/a |
| August 28, 2015 | Cincinnati | United States | Riverbend Music Center | Justin Moore; Mickey Guyton | 14,967 / 21,000 | $519,479 |
| August 29, 2015 | Noblesville | United States | Klipsch Music Center | Justin Moore; Mickey Guyton | 19,567 / 21,000 | $638,449 |
| August 30, 2015 | Maryland Heights | United States | Hollywood Casino Amphitheatre | Justin Moore; Mickey Guyton | 14,768 / 19,000 | $435,550 |
| September 17, 2015 | Albuquerque | United States | Isleta Amphitheater | Justin Moore; Mickey Guyton | 13,945 / 16,000 | $419,339 |
| September 18, 2015^{[E]} | Denver | United States | Pepsi Center | Justin Moore; Mickey Guyton | 10,762 / 10,762 | $466,484 |
| September 19, 2015 | West Valley City | United States | USANA Amphitheatre | Justin Moore; Mickey Guyton | 14,233 / 20,000 | $456,229 |
| September 25, 2015 | Mansfield | United States | Xfinity Center | Justin Moore; Mickey Guyton | 18,559 / 21,000 | $597,447 |
| September 26, 2015 | Bristow | United States | Jiffy Lube Live | Justin Moore; Mickey Guyton | 17,897 / 19,000 | $637,668 |
| September 27, 2015 | Virginia Beach | United States | Farm Bureau Live | Justin Moore; Mickey Guyton | 14,934 / 19,000 | $467,336 |
| October 2, 2015 | Tampa | United States | MidFlorida Credit Union Amphitheatre | Justin Moore; Mickey Guyton | 15,987 / 19,000 | $545,550 |
| October 3, 2015 | West Palm Beach | United States | Perfect Vodka Amphitheatre | Justin Moore; Mickey Guyton | 16,789 / 19,000 | $596,337 |
North America leg #2
| January 21, 2016 | Jonesboro | United States | ASU Convocation Center | Eric Paslay; Cam | —N/a | —N/a |
| January 22, 2016 | Cape Girardeau | United States | Show Me Center | Eric Paslay; Cam | —N/a | —N/a |
| January 23, 2016 | Corbin | United States | Corbin Arena | Eric Paslay; Cam | —N/a | —N/a |
| January 29, 2016 | Bangor | United States | Cross Insurance Arena | Eric Paslay; Cam | 5,919 / 5,919 | $343,274 |
| January 30, 2016 | Syracuse | United States | Oncenter War Memorial Arena | Eric Paslay; Cam | 6,197 / 6,197 | $285,754 |
| January 31, 2016 | Uncasville | United States | Mohegan Sun Arena | Eric Paslay; Cam | 7,235 / 7,235 | $395,274 |
| February 4, 2016 | LaCrosse | United States | LaCrosse Center | Eric Paslay; Cam | 4,797 / 4,797 | $287,990 |
| February 5, 2016 | Madison | United States | Alliant Energy Center | Eric Paslay; Cam | 6,792 / 7,000 | $372,120 |
| February 11, 2016 | Eugene | United States | Matthew Knight Arena | Eric Paslay; Cam | 7,193 / 7,193 | $439,448 |
| February 12, 2016 | Spokane | United States | Spokane Arena | Eric Paslay; Cam | 9,785 / 9,785 | $449,239 |
| February 13, 2016 | Tacoma | United States | Tacoma Dome | Eric Paslay; Cam | 10,112 / 10,112 | $502,337 |
| February 14, 2016 | Vancouver | Canada | Rogers Arena | Eric Paslay; Cam | 10,195 / 10,195 | $472,325 |
| February 18, 2016 | Calgary | Canada | Scotiabank Saddledome | Eric Paslay; Cam | 11,324 / 11,324 | $576,858 |
| February 19, 2016 | Edmonton | Canada | Rexall Place | Eric Paslay; Cam | 11,042 / 11,042 | $509,495 |
| February 20, 2016 | Regina | Canada | Brandt Centre | Eric Paslay; Cam | 5,770 / 5,770 | $276,061 |
| February 25, 2016 | Wichita | United States | Intrust Bank Arena | Eric Paslay; Cam | 6,897 / 9,900 | $349,345 |
| February 26, 2016 | Springfield | United States | JQH Arena | Eric Paslay; Cam | 7,443 / 8,211 | $341,958 |
| February 27, 2016 | Tulsa | United States | BOK Center | Eric Paslay; Cam | 7,371 / 10,000 | $368,474 |
| March 10, 2016 | Toledo | United States | Huntington Center | Eric Paslay; Cam | 7,649 / 7,649 | $399,350 |
| March 11, 2016 | Saginaw | United States | Dow Event Center | Eric Paslay; Cam | 5,264 / 5,264 | $298,449rd |
| March 12, 2016 | Bloomington | United States | US Cellular Coliseum | Eric Paslay; Cam | 6,218 / 6,218 | $309,448 |
| Total | | | | | 516,910 / 574,375 (90%) | $19,457,950 |

Miscellaneous performances
^{A} This concert is a part of the Faster Horses Festival.
^{B} This concert is a part of the Mountain Home Country Music Festival.
^{C} This concert is a part of the Boots and Hearts Music Festival.
^{D} This concert is a part of the Texas Thunder Country Music Festival.
^{E} This concert is a part of KYGO's Birthday Bash.

== Critical reception ==
Syracuse.com's Dan Poorman says, "You don't have to be a country music fan to enjoy a Brad Paisley show."
