= Life Amplified World Tour =

2016–17 concert tour by Brad Paisley

- Tour by Brad Paisley
- Promotional poster for the tour
- Start date: May 19, 2016
- End date: February 18, 2017
- Legs: 2
- No. of shows: 44
- Box office: $2.8 million

Brad Paisley concert chronology
- Crushin' It World Tour (2015–16); Life Amplified World Tour (2016–17); Weekend Warrior World Tour (2017–18)

The Life Amplified World Tour was the eleventh headlining concert tour by American country music singer Brad Paisley. It began on May 19, 2016, in Wheatland, California and concluded on February 18, 2017, in Verona, New York, The tour played through amphitheaters and festivals across the United States and Canada.

== Background ==
The tour was first announced in May 2016, through Paisley's website. Opening up for Paisley for most of the dates was Tyler Farr and Maddie & Tae. The second North American leg was announced in December 2016. Paisley also brought the tour to the UK, returning to headline the 2017 C2C: Country to Country festival in London, Glasgow and Dublin after cancelling two proposed dates at London's O_{2} Arena in July 2016.

== Concert synopsis ==
Paisley performs his past hits, and his new single, "Without a Fight". During "Without a Fight", his collaboration with Demi Lovato, there is video of Lovato in the recording studio that is played alongside. Lovato did make a surprise appearance in Irvine, California on May 20, 2016.

== Opening acts ==
Leg #1

- Brandy Clark
- Tyler Farr
- Brett Kissel
- Chris Lane
- Maddie & Tae
- Chris Young

Leg #2

- Chase Bryant
- Lindsay Ell

== Setlist ==
The current setlist is as follows:

1. "The World"
2. "Water"/"Perfect Storm"
3. "Country Nation"
4. "This Is Country Music"
5. "Crushin' It / I'm Still a Guy" (with (Tyler Farr)
6. "She's Everything"
7. "American Saturday Night"
8. "Celebrity"
9. "Old Alabama"
10. "Then"
11. "Beat This Summer"
12. "Ticks"
13. "I'm Gonna Miss Her (The Fishin' Song)"
14. "Letter to Me"
15. "Ashamed of Your Selfie"
16. "Southern Comfort Zone"
17. "Without a Fight"
18. "Online"
19. "Mud on the Tires"
  Encore
20. "River Bank"
21. "Alcohol"

== Tour dates ==
Dates	City	Country	Venue	Opening acts	Attendance	Revenue
North America leg #1
May 19, 2016	Wheatland	United States	Toyota Amphitheatre	Tyler Farr; Maddie & Tae	13,587 / 19,000	$468,449
May 20, 2016	Irvine	United States	Irvine Meadows Amphitheatre	Tyler Farr; Maddie & Tae	14,567 / 15,000	$599,446
May 21, 2016	Chula Vista	United States	Sleep Train Amphitheatre	Tyler Farr; Maddie & Tae	16,390 / 19,000	$525,119
June 2, 2016	Phoenix	United States	Ak-Chin Pavilion	Tyler Farr; Maddie & Tae	10,036 / 19,000	$396,455
June 3, 2016	Albuquerque	United States	Isleta Amphitheater	Tyler Farr; Maddie & Tae	9,377 / 14,000	$367,559
June 11, 2016 (Note: This show was a part of the Winstock Country Music Festival.)	Winsted	United States	Winstock Country Music Festival	Tyler Farr; Maddie & Tae	—N/a	—N/a
June 17, 2016 (Note: This show was a part of the Country Jam.)	Mack	United States	Country Jam Ranch	Tyler Farr; Maddie & Tae	—N/a	—N/a
June 18, 2016	Laughlin	United States	Laughlin Events Center	Tyler Farr; Maddie & Tae	—N/a	—N/a
June 25, 2016	Hartford	United States	Xfinity Theatre	Tyler Farr; Maddie & Tae	13,483 / 21,000	$459,003
July 12, 2016 (Note: This show was a part of the Quebec City Summer Festival.)	Quebec City	Canada	Plains of Abraham	Tyler Farr; Maddie & Tae	—N/a	—N/a
July 13, 2016 (Note: This show was a part of the Ottawa Bluesfest.)	Ottawa	Canada	LeBreton Flats	Tyler Farr; Maddie & Tae	—N/a	—N/a
July 14, 2016 (Note: This show is a part of Rock at the Park)	London	Canada	Harris Park	Tyler Farr; Maddie & Tae	—N/a	—N/a
July 16, 2016 (Note: This show is a part of Jamboree in the Hills.)	Morristown	United States	The Barn Stage	Tyler Farr; Maddie & Tae	—N/a	—N/a
July 30, 2016	Noblesville	United States	Klipsch Music Center	Chris Young; Brett Kissel	16,956 / 21,000	$585,288
July 31, 2016	Clarkston	United States	DTE Energy Music Theatre	Chris Young; Brandy Clark; Chris Lane	15,315 / 15,315	$598,449
August 4, 2016	Wantagh	United States	Nikon at Jones Beach Theater	Tyler Farr; Maddie & Tae	13,942 / 13,942	$599,336
August 5, 2016	Burgettstown	United States	First Niagara Pavilion	Tyler Farr; Maddie & Tae	13,496 / 19,000	$427,951
August 6, 2016	Cincinnati	United States	Riverbend Music Center	Tyler Farr; Maddie & Tae	—N/a	—N/a
August 7, 2016	Maryland Heights	United States	Hollywood Casino Amphitheatre	Tyler Farr; Maddie & Tae	16,759 / 19,000	$475,879
August 11, 2016	Alpharetta	United States	Verizon Wireless Amphitheatre	Tyler Farr; Maddie & Tae	9,116 / 11,000	$396,335
August 12, 2016	Tampa	United States	MidFlorida Credit Union Amphitheatre	Tyler Farr; Maddie & Tae	13,980 / 17,000	$399,455
August 13, 2016	West Palm Beach	United States	Perfect Vodka Amphitheatre	Tyler Farr; Maddie & Tae	16,972 / 19,000	$489,330
August 18, 2016	Toronto	Canada	Molson Canadian Amphitheatre	Tyler Farr; Maddie & Tae	14,989 / 14,989	$620,893
August 19, 2016	Darien Center	United States	Darien Lake PAC	Tyler Farr; Maddie & Tae	12,349 / 19,000	$427,448
August 26, 2016	Cedar Park	United States	H-E-B Center at Cedar Park	Tyler Farr; Maddie & Tae	—N/a	—N/a
August 27, 2016	Dallas	United States	Gexa Energy Pavilion	Tyler Farr; Maddie & Tae	15,945 / 19,000	$469,772
September 9, 2016	Morgantown	United States	West Virginia University	Tyler Farr; Maddie & Tae		
September 10, 2016	Tinley Park	United States	Hollywood Casino Amphitheatre	Tyler Farr; Maddie & Tae	13,697 / 21,000	$487,559
September 14, 2016	Mansfield	United States	Xfinity Center	Tyler Farr; Maddie & Tae	16,976 / 19,000	$634,285
September 16, 2016	Cuyahoga Falls	United States	Blossom Music Center	Tyler Farr; Maddie & Tae	16,338 / 19,000	$525,410
September 17, 2016	Charlotte	United States	PNC Music Pavilion	Tyler Farr; Maddie & Tae	14,399 / 19,000	$497,442
September 18, 2016	Raleigh	United States	Coastal Credit Union Music Park	Tyler Farr; Maddie & Tae	13,986 / 19,000	$435,559
September 22, 2016	Virginia Beach	United States	Veterans United Home Loans Amphitheater	Tyler Farr; Maddie & Tae	13,258 / 19,000	$419,449
September 23, 2016	Bristow	United States	Jiffy Lube Live	Tyler Farr; Maddie & Tae	14,305 / 21,000	$475,339
October 1, 2016 (Note: This show is a part of the Route 91 Harvest Country Music Festival.)	Las Vegas	United States	Route 91 Harvest Country Music Festival	—N/a	—N/a	
North America leg #2
February 1, 2017	Sault Ste. Marie	Canada	Essar Centre	Chase Bryant; Lindsay Ell	–	–
February 2, 2017	Sudbury	Canada	Sudbury Arena	Chase Bryant; Lindsay Ell	–	–
February 3, 2017	Peterborough	Canada	Peterborough Memorial Centre	Chase Bryant; Lindsay Ell	–	–
February 4, 2017	Kingston	Canada	Rogers K-Rock Centre	Chase Bryant; Lindsay Ell	–	–
February 9, 2017	Augusta	United States	Augusta Civic Center	Chase Bryant; Lindsay Ell	–	–
February 10, 2017	Moncton	Canada	Moncton Coliseum	Chase Bryant; Lindsay Ell	–	–
February 11, 2017	Sydney	Canada	Centre 200	Chase Bryant; Lindsay Ell	–	–
February 16, 2017	Wilkes-Barre	United States	Mohegan Sun Arena at Casey Plaza	Chase Bryant; Lindsay Ell	–	–
February 17, 2017	Hershey	United States	Giant Center	Chase Bryant; Lindsay Ell	–	–
February 18, 2017	Verona	United States	Turning Stone Resort & Casino	Chase Bryant; Lindsay Ell	–	–
Total					340,218 / 432,246 (79%)	$11,781,210

=== Notes ===
Festivals and fairs

Cancelled shows

- The Pepsi Gulf Coast Jam in Panama City on September 2, 2016, was cancelled due to Hurricane Hermine.

== Critical reception ==
Michael James Rocha of The San Diego Union-Tribune says that Paisley was "still crushin' it" and for his performance, "Vocally, he is solid, though there were moments Saturday when he seemed somewhat disengaged — as if he was merely going through the motions. But musically, when he was one with his guitar, it was magical."
