= Weekend Warrior World Tour =

2017–2018 concert tour by Brad Paisley

- Tour by Brad Paisley
- Location: North America; Europe
- Associated album: Love and War
- Start date: May 18, 2017
- End date: April 26, 2018
- Legs: 4
- No. of shows: 61 in North America; 3 in Europe; 64 in total

Brad Paisley concert chronology
- Life Amplified World Tour (2016–17); Weekend Warrior World Tour (2017–18); Brad Paisley World Tour (2019)

The Weekend Warrior World Tour was the twelfth headlining concert tour by American country music singer Brad Paisley, and was in support of his eleventh studio album Love and War (2017). It began on May 18, 2017, in Saratoga Springs, New York and finished on April 26, 2018, in Lincoln, Nebraska. The tour visited North America and Europe. "Weekend Warrior" derives from Paisley playing on weekends this tour.

== Background and Band Against Cancer ==
The tour was first announced in May 2017. The 2018 leg was announced in November 2017.

For this tour Paisley has teamed up with the Sarah Cannon the Cancer Institute of HCA to "Band Against Cancer". At every show concert there will be onsite resources where concert goers can "askSARAH" (the institute's hotline) questions. At the show fans can purchase Paisley's album Love and War for $15, and as part of "get one, give one", when they buy a copy, they can send a copy to a cancer patient for an additional $15.

== Opening acts ==
- Chase Bryant (United States, Europe, Canada)
- Lindsay Ell (United States, Canada)
- Dustin Lynch (United States)

== Setlist ==
This setlist is a representation of the Raleigh, NC show.

1. "Last Time for Everything"
2. "Old Alabama"
3. "Perfect Storm"
4. "Online"
5. "One Beer Can"
6. "Crushin' It"
7. "This Is Country Music"
8. "Love and War"
9. "American Saturday Night"
10. "Ticks"
11. "I'm Still a Guy"
12. "Celebrity"
13. "Then"
14. "She's Everything"
15. "River Bank"
16. "Grey Goose Chase"
17. "Waitin' on a Woman"
18. "When I Get Where I'm Going"
19. "Water"
20. "Whiskey Lullaby"
21. "I'm Gonna Miss Her (The Fishin' Song)"
22. "Mud on the Tires"
23. "Today"
  Encore
24. "Alcohol"

== Tour dates ==
Dates	City	Country	Venue	Opening acts	Attendance	Revenue
North America leg #1
May 18, 2017	Saratoga Springs	United States	Saratoga Performing Arts Center	Dustin Lynch; Chase Bryant; Lindsay Ell	—N/a	—N/a
May 19, 2017	Camden	United States	BB&T Pavilion	Dustin Lynch; Chase Bryant; Lindsay Ell	—N/a	—N/a
May 20, 2017	Raleigh	United States	Coastal Credit Union Music Park	Dustin Lynch; Chase Bryant; Lindsay Ell	—N/a	—N/a
June 16, 2017	Wheatland	United States	Toyota Amphitheatre	Dustin Lynch; Chase Bryant; Lindsay Ell	—N/a	—N/a
June 17, 2017	Mountain View	United States	Shoreline Amphitheatre	Dustin Lynch; Chase Bryant; Lindsay Ell	—N/a	—N/a
June 23, 2017	Chula Vista	United States	Mattress Firm Amphitheatre	Dustin Lynch; Chase Bryant; Lindsay Ell	14,922 / 19,000	$429,750
June 24, 2017	Anaheim	United States	Honda Center	Dustin Lynch; Chase Bryant; Lindsay Ell	10,757 / 10,757	$539,550
June 25, 2017	Phoenix	United States	Ak-Chin Pavilion	Dustin Lynch; Chase Bryant; Lindsay Ell	14,990 / 19,000	$399,440
June 29, 2017	Ridgefield	United States	Sunlight Supply Amphitheater	Dustin Lynch; Chase Bryant; Lindsay Ell	10,004 / 15,000	$381,339
June 30, 2017	Auburn	United States	White River Amphitheater	Dustin Lynch; Chase Bryant; Lindsay Ell	9,306 / 16,000	$313,506
July 14, 2017	Albuquerque	United States	Isleta Amphitheater	Dustin Lynch; Chase Bryant; Lindsay Ell	14,695 / 17,000	$431,339
July 15, 2017	Denver	United States	Pepsi Center	Dustin Lynch; Chase Bryant; Lindsay Ell	10,563 / 12,000	$475,185
Europe
July 24, 2017	Gävle	Sweden	Furuviksparken	Chase Bryant	—N/a	—N/a
July 25, 2017	Stockholm	Sweden	Gröna Lund	Chase Bryant	—N/a	—N/a
July 28, 2017	Seljord	Norway	Countryfestivalen	Chase Bryant	—N/a	—N/a
North America leg #2
August 3, 2017	Wantagh	United States	Northwell Health at Jones Beach Theater	Dustin Lynch; Chase Bryant; Lindsay Ell	13,997 / 13,997	$579,838
August 4, 2017	Holmdel	United States	PNC Bank Arts Center	Dustin Lynch; Chase Bryant; Lindsay Ell	16,979 / 16,979	$601,339
August 5, 2017	Mansfield	United States	Xfinity Center	Dustin Lynch; Chase Bryant; Lindsay Ell	16,903 / 23,000	$599,880
August 6, 2017	Hartford	United States	Xfinity Theatre	Dustin Lynch; Chase Bryant; Lindsay Ell	17,814 / 24,000	$463,445
August 10, 2017	Cincinnati	United States	Riverbend Music Center	Dustin Lynch; Chase Bryant; Lindsay Ell	14,242 / 19,000	$441,559
August 11, 2017	Noblesville	United States	Klipsch Music Center	Dustin Lynch; Chase Bryant; Lindsay Ell	17,101 / 23,000	$419,595
August 12, 2017	Mount Pleasant	United States	Soaring Eagle Casino & Resort	Dustin Lynch; Chase Bryant; Lindsay Ell	–	–
August 13, 2017 (Note: The show on August 13, 2017, was a part of the Illinois State Fair.)	Springfield	United States	Illinois State Fairgrounds	Dustin Lynch; Chase Bryant; Lindsay Ell	–	–
August 18, 2017 (Note: The show on August 18, 2017, was a part of Country Thunder.)	Calgary	Canada	Prairie Winds Park	—N/a	–	–
August 19, 2017	Saskatoon	Canada	SaskTel Centre	Chase Bryant; Lindsay Ell	–	–
August 20, 2017	Winnipeg	Canada	MTS Centre	Chase Bryant; Lindsay Ell	–	–
August 25, 2017 (Note: The show on August 25, 2017, was a part of the Nebraska State Fair.)	Grand Island	United States	Fonner Park Race Track	Dustin Lynch; Chase Bryant; Lindsay Ell	–	–
August 26, 2017	Red Wing	United States	Treasure Island Casino	Dustin Lynch; Chase Bryant; Lindsay Ell	–	–
September 1, 2017	Rogers	United States	Walmart Arkansas Music Pavilion	Dustin Lynch; Chase Bryant; Lindsay Ell	–	–
September 2, 2017	Irving	United States	Irving Music Factory	Dustin Lynch; Chase Bryant; Lindsay Ell	–	–
September 8, 2017	Charlotte	United States	PNC Music Pavilion	Dustin Lynch; Chase Bryant; Lindsay Ell	14,103 / 19,000	$426,344
September 9, 2017	Bristow	United States	Jiffy Lube Live	Dustin Lynch; Chase Bryant; Lindsay Ell	16,983 / 21,000	$509,865
September 10, 2017	Virginia Beach	United States	Veterans United Home Loans Amphitheater	Dustin Lynch; Chase Bryant; Lindsay Ell	12,406 / 19,000	$399,459
September 15, 2017	West Palm Beach	United States	Perfect Vodka Amphitheatre	Dustin Lynch; Chase Bryant; Lindsay Ell	15,975 / 19,000	$468,345
September 16, 2017	Tampa	United States	MidFlorida Credit Union Amphitheatre	Dustin Lynch; Chase Bryant; Lindsay Ell	18,959 / 18,959	$521,883
September 22, 2017	Cuyahoga Falls	United States	Blossom Music Center	Dustin Lynch; Chase Bryant; Lindsay Ell	18,909 / 21,000	$599,735
September 23, 2017	Tinley Park	United States	Hollywood Casino Amphitheatre	Dustin Lynch; Chase Bryant; Lindsay Ell	18,404 / 24,000	$546,375
September 24, 2017	Maryland Heights	United States	Hollywood Casino Amphitheatre	Dustin Lynch; Chase Bryant; Lindsay Ell	15,695 / 19,000	$468,865
North America leg #3
January 25, 2018	Los Angeles	United States	Staples Center	Dustin Lynch; Chase Bryant; Lindsay Ell		
January 26, 2018	Fresno	United States	Save Mart Center	Dustin Lynch; Chase Bryant; Lindsay Ell		
January 27, 2018	Glendale	United States	Gila River Arena	Dustin Lynch; Chase Bryant; Lindsay Ell		
February 1, 2018	Salt Lake City	United States	Vivint Smart Home Arena	Dustin Lynch; Chase Bryant; Lindsay Ell		
February 2, 2018	Boise	United States	Taco Bell Arena	Dustin Lynch; Chase Bryant; Lindsay Ell		
February 3, 2018	Reno	United States	Reno Events Center	Dustin Lynch; Chase Bryant; Lindsay Ell		
February 15, 2018	Bloomington	United States	Grossinger Motors Arena	Dustin Lynch; Chase Bryant; Lindsay Ell		
February 16, 2018	Kansas City	United States	Sprint Center	Dustin Lynch; Chase Bryant; Lindsay Ell		
February 17, 2018	Cedar Falls	United States	McLeod Center	Dustin Lynch; Chase Bryant; Lindsay Ell		
February 19, 2018 (Note: The show on February 19, 2018, was a part of the San Antonio Stock Show & Rodeo.)	San Antonio	United States	San Antonio Rodeo	—N/a		
February 20, 2018 (Note: The show on February 20, 2018, was a part of the San Antonio Stock Show & Rodeo.)	San Antonio	United States	San Antonio Rodeo	—N/a		
February 22, 2018	Knoxville	United States	Thompson-Boling Arena	Dustin Lynch; Chase Bryant; Lindsay Elle		
February 23, 2018	Pikeville	United States	Eastern Kentucky Expo Center	Dustin Lynch; Chase Bryant; Lindsay Elle		
February 24, 2018	Rosemont	United States	Allstate Arena	Dustin Lynch; Chase Bryant; Lindsay Elle		
March 8, 2018	Savannah	United States	Savannah Civic Center	Dustin Lynch; Chase Bryant; Lindsay Elle		
March 9, 2018	Tallahassee	United States	Donald L. Tucker Center	Dustin Lynch; Chase Bryant; Lindsay Elle		
March 10, 2018	St. Augustine	United States	St. Augustine Amphitheatre	Dustin Lynch; Chase Bryant; Lindsay Elle		
March 11, 2018 (Note: The show on March 11, 2018, was a part of the Florida Strawberry Festival.)	Plant City	United States	Florida Strawberry Festival	—N/a		
March 16, 2018	Marksville	United States	Paragon Casino Resort	—N/a		
March 22, 2018	Erie	United States	Erie Insurance Arena	Dustin Lynch; Chase Bryant; Lindsay Elle		
March 23, 2018	Louisville	United States	KFC Yum! Center	Dustin Lynch; Chase Bryant; Lindsay Elle		
March 24, 2018	Moline	United States	TaxSlayer Center	Dustin Lynch; Chase Bryant; Lindsay Elle		
April 5, 2018	Columbus	United States	Value City Arena	Dustin Lynch; Chase Bryant; Lindsay Elle		
April 7, 2018	Grand Rapids	United States	Van Andel Arena	Dustin Lynch; Chase Bryant; Lindsay Elle		
April 12, 2018	North Little Rock	United States	Verizon Arena	Dustin Lynch; Chase Bryant; Lindsay Elle		
April 26, 2018	Lincoln	United States	Pinnacle Bank Arena	Dustin Lynch; Chase Bryant; Lindsay Elle		
Total					343,707 / 389,692	$10,016,636
