= Moonshine in the Trunk =

Studio album by Brad Paisley
- Released: August 25, 2014
- Genre: Country
- Length: 51:20
- Label: Arista Nashville
- Producer: Brad Paisley; Luke Wooten

Brad Paisley chronology
Wheelhouse (2013)	Moonshine in the Trunk (2014)	Love and War (2017)

Singles from Moonshine in the Trunk
- 1. "River Bank" Released: April 14, 2014; 2. "Perfect Storm" Released: September 1, 2014; 3. "Crushin' It" Released: January 26, 2015; 4. "Country Nation" Released: September 14, 2015

Moonshine in the Trunk is the eleventh studio album by American country music artist Brad Paisley. It was released on August 25, 2014, by Arista Nashville. It became Paisley's eighth album to hit No. 1 on Billboard's country chart.

== Background ==
The album was first announced on May 8, 2014, and features duets with Emmylou Harris and Carrie Underwood. Paisley revealed he built a honky tonk so he and his band can get inspired and to establish a vibe for the album. He said: "I wanted this to be a modern honky-tonk record, but not one that's a 'cry in your beer' honky-tonk record: more like a honky-tonk record that Buck Owens would've made". He wanted to make a record that's "everything [he] love[s] about country music, in a modern sense with some new technology". He added that "the record is a largely positive take on life right now. It's got this sentiment of, 'well, things aren't perfect, but it's Friday'".

== Promotion ==
The first single released from the album was "River Bank". It was made digitally available on April 6, 2014, after Paisley's performance of the song at the annual Academy of Country Music Awards. The song peaked at No. 2 on the Country Airplay chart, behind Dierks Bentley's "Drunk on a Plane".

On July 26, Paisley tweeted that he was going to release a preview of the whole album and that his label didn't know it. The joke continued with Paisley posting previews of songs from the album and simulating a feud with his label. He also posted a remix of the album's first single, "River Bank", featuring Colt Ford.

The tracks "Perfect Storm", "Crushin' It", "Country Nation" and "Shattered Glass" were released as promotional singles in advance of the album's release, all of which charted at No. 45, No. 46, No. 37 and No. 44, respectively, on the Hot Country Songs chart. "Perfect Storm" was released on September 2, 2014 as the album's second single and it has since reached No.1 on the Billboard Country Airplay chart.

The third single, "Crushin' It", was released on January 26, 2015.

The fourth single, "Country Nation", was released on September 14, 2015.

The popular YouTube series Annoying Orange animated a music video for the track "Limes", featuring Paisley portraying himself as a lime wearing a cowboy hat. Throughout the video, several other limes are sliced in half, thrown into a blender, and are consumed as margaritas, including Brad himself at the end of the video.

== Songs and lyrics ==
The opening track and third single from the album, "Crushin' It", is about having fun when things have not necessarily been going your way, drinking a beer and then crushing the can. Paisley stated the song has the sentiment of "well, things aren't perfect, but it's Friday". "River Bank" has been called a fun-loving warm-weather single. In the song, the narrator buys some scratch-off tickets and he and his girlfriend dream to be millionaires; until the dream comes true, they can have fun on the river bank. Paisley said the inspiration for the song came by the memories of his grandfather, his dad and himself near the Ohio River. "Perfect Storm" was released as the album's second single and it received positive reviews from many critics. It is a ballad about the girl every man is looking for. "High Life" features backing vocals by Carrie Underwood and tells the story of a money-hungry family. In the third verse they even sue Underwood herself over a song of hers, claiming she stole it from a poem the singer's brother wrote in second grade. The song refers to a real-life legal battle which involves singer-songwriter Lizza Connor and Paisley's co-writers Kelley Lovelace and Chris DuBois. Connor claims Lovelace and DuBois stole parts of Paisley and Underwood's smash hit "Remind Me" from a song she'd originally written, also called "Remind Me".

The title-track is an uptempo country rock song mainly driven by electric guitar and fiddle. In it, Paisley asks his lover to join him for a high-speed ride through the country in his '69 Camaro. The song "Shattered Glass" has been called a feminist ode to female empowerment. When asked about the song, Paisley said "there’s two people I really wrote that for. One of them is my wife [actress Kimberly Williams-Paisley], [...] and the other one is our daughter who does not exist...what song would I write for my daughter? It would be this exact song". He added that "the song is supposed to be a pep talk to [his wife] and any woman who has dreams she wants to achieve, and thinks to herself "this might not be something a woman like me can do." Not true. Go do it! It’s meant to be a total vote of confidence and love song in that sense. It’s basically 'I believe in you!'". The song was highly praised by critics. "Limes" is an upbeat song about taking what life gives you and making the best of it. "You Shouldn't Have To" is introduced by a bluesy electric guitar solo and in the song, the narrator describes some things a girl could do alone, but she "shouldn't have to."

The song "4WP" pokes fun at bro country tendency by acknowledging the trend and lingering on some of its recurrent elements (cut-off jeans, pickup truck, dirt road). A sample of Paisley's former hit Mud on the Tires is also featured in the song. About the song, Paisley said, "in the middle of this bro-country movement, with all this criticism about [the genre's reliance on] the jean shorts and the mud and the outdoors, we do a song that's just like that… but we include a sample of myself from 2003! Which is kind of like saying, 'I have a little license. I kinda did this already.' But it's written so tongue-in-cheek, and it doesn't take itself too seriously." "Cover Girl" is about a beautiful girl who would be put on the cover of magazines if she was discovered. The Bluegrass-influenced "Gone Green" was written by Paisley's bass player Kenny Lewis and features Emmylou Harris on background vocals, discussing a "redneck" who has "gone green" for helping the environment. "American Flag on the Moon" is another ballad about how the United States is capable of so many great feats, especially after putting a man on the Moon. Paisley said he was inspired to write the song by his five years old son Jasper, who -after he heard about the Moon landing- looked up at the sky and said "I think I can see the flag". "American Flag on the Moon" is introduced by a short prelude, "JFK 1962," which samples a famous speech from former President John F. Kennedy. The penultimate song, "Country Nation" describes all the different types of people that make up the United States, giving heavy reference to college athletics.

The final track, "Me and Jesus", was included as an "extra special bonus track" on the album. Paisley recorded the song and dedicated it to Kent Brantly, a Christian doctor infected by the Ebola virus. Brantly contracted the virus while working with sick patients. Selflessly, the doctor gave the serum to his friend rather than taking it himself. Paisley said he was moved by this fact, and so he added the song as a bonus track on the album. Paisley had originally sung the song at country singer and icon George Jones' funeral on May 2, 2013 at the Grand Ole Opry.

== Critical reception ==
Professional ratings
Aggregate scores
Source	Rating
Metacritic	56/100
Review scores
Source	Rating
AllMusic	3.5/5 stars
Cuepoint (Expert Witness)	(1-star Honorable Mention)
Got Country	4.5/5 stars
Newsday	B−
Rolling Stone	3/5 stars
Slant Magazine	3/5 stars
UK Country Music	10/10 stars
USA Today	3/4 stars
Ultimate Guitar	8.3/10 stars
Country Universe	3/5 stars

The album received mixed to positive reviews from critics.

Stephen Thomas Erlewine writes for AllMusic that the album "proves his strengths remain mighty potent." Christian Hoard writes for Rolling Stone saying how Paisley "caters to his base" while simultaneously he "prods it a little." Jordan Mitchell writes for UK Country Music that Moonshine in the Trunk is a "classic Brad Paisley sounding album full of entertaining lyrics and outstanding musical accompaniment including Paisley’s handy guitar skills." Deborah Evans Price writes for Billboard how Paisley "succeeds on every level from the clever songwriting to his signature tasty guitar licks and personality-packed vocals." Sarah Rodman writes for The Boston Globe saying how Paisley continues to show "his clever wit... his skillful guitar playing, curiosity about human interaction, and his nice guy affability."

Brian Mansfield writes for USA Today how "Paisley's first album that doesn't sound more ambitious than his last, Moonshine occasionally forces its cleverness", whilst he maintains "the vision to look beyond his tailgate and dream of a better world." Jeremy Winograd writes for Slant Magazine how the music is "composed of one part willfully idiotic pandering and two parts loose, fun, and rocking party country" that's "mostly upbeat, feel-good summertime album that largely minimizes Paisley's tendency toward hokey power balladry." Whilst Winograd averring, "It proves that Paisley is more than adept at bucking Nashville's expectations; it's when he adheres to them that he gets in trouble." Giving the album a B− rating, Glenn Gamboa writes for Newsday that it is "A mixed bag of cool country and tired cliches."

== Commercial performance ==
The album debuted in the US at No. 2 on the Billboard 200, selling 53,000 copies in its first week. In the second week the album sold 16,000 copies. It was Paisley's fifth disc overall to reach second place on Billboard's main album chart. As of September 2015, the album has sold 187,400 copies in the US.

== Track listing ==
No.	Title	Writer(s)	Length
1.	"Crushin' It"	Brad Paisley; Kelley Lovelace; Lee Thomas Miller	3:39
2.	"River Bank"	Paisley; Lovelace	2:59
3.	"Perfect Storm"	Paisley; Miller	3:55
4.	"High Life" (featuring Carrie Underwood)	Paisley; Lovelace; Chris DuBois; Brent Anderson	3:44
5.	"Moonshine in the Trunk"	Paisley; DuBois; Anderson	3:59
6.	"Shattered Glass"	Paisley	3:45
7.	"Limes"	Paisley; Lovelace; Miller	3:56
8.	"You Shouldn't Have To"	Paisley; Lovelace; Tim Owens	3:54
9.	"4WP"	Paisley; DuBois; Anderson	3:27
10.	"Cover Girl"	Paisley; DuBois; Anderson	3:11
11.	"Gone Green" (featuring Emmylou Harris)	Kenny Lewis	3:16
12.	"JFK 1962" (Instrumental featuring a speech from John F. Kennedy)	Paisley	0:54
13.	"American Flag on the Moon"	Paisley	3:47
14.	"Country Nation"	Paisley; DuBois; Lovelace	3:45
15.	"Me and Jesus" (extra special bonus track)	Tom T. Hall	3:19
Total length:			51:20

== Personnel ==
Vocals

- Brent Anderson — background vocals
- Emmylou Harris — featured vocals
- Wes Hightower — background vocals
- Carl Jackson — background vocals
- Kenny Lewis — background vocals
- Mrs. King's class at Montessori Academy — children's choir
- Kendall Marcy — background vocals
- Brad Paisley — lead vocals
- Carrie Underwood — featured vocals
- Luke Wooten — background vocals

Design

- Chris DuBois — creative director
- Ben Enos — photography
- Jim Shea — photography

Production and instruments

- Randle Currie — pedal steel guitar
- Rafe Hollister — mixing
- Gary Hooker — electric guitar, tic-tac bass
- Scott Johnson — production assistant
- Kenny Lewis — acoustic bass, electric bass
- Bob Ludwig — mastering
- Kyle Manner — assistant, digital editing, engineer
- Kendall Marcy — assistant, associate production, banjo, clavichord, digital editing, engineering, Fender Rhodes, Hammond B-3 organ, keyboards, piano, synthesizer
- Gordon Mote — piano
- Brad Paisley — acoustic guitar, electric guitar, mandolin, mixing, producer, programming, tic tac
- Jasper Paisley — harmonica
- Ben Sesar — drums, percussion
- Bryan Sutton — acoustic guitar, banjo
- Justin Williamson — cello, fiddle, mandolin, violin
- Brian David Willis — digital editing
- Luke Wooten — engineer, mixing, percussion, producer

== Chart positions ==
The album debuted at No. 1 on Country Albums Chart and UK Country Albums Chart, while it peaked at No. 2 in Canada and on the Billboard 200 and reached No. 14 in Australia. It also charted in Norway, Switzerland and UK.

=== Weekly charts ===
Chart (2014–15)	Peak position
Australian Albums (ARIA)	14
Australian Country Albums (ARIA)	4
Canadian Albums (Billboard)	2
Irish Albums (IRMA)	55
Norwegian Albums (VG-lista)	13
Scottish Albums (OCC)	27
Swiss Albums (Schweizer Hitparade)	49
UK Albums (OCC)	34
UK Album Downloads (OCC)	47
UK Country Albums (OCC)	1
US Billboard 200	2
US Top Country Albums (Billboard)	1

=== Year-end charts ===
Chart (2014)	Position
US Billboard 200	180
US Top Country Albums (Billboard)	39
Chart (2015)	Position
US Top Country Albums (Billboard)	44
