= The Medicine Will =

Single by Brad Paisley

from the album Son of the Mountains
- A-side: "Son of the Mountains" (double A-side)
- Released: September 29, 2023
- Genre: Bluegrass
- Length: 4:09
- Label: EMI Nashville
- Songwriters: Lee Thomas Miller; Brad Paisley
- Producers: Brad Paisley; Luke Wooten

Brad Paisley singles chronology
"So Many Summers" (2023)	"The Medicine Will" / "Son of the Mountains" (2023)

Music video
- "The Medicine Will" on YouTube

"The Medicine Will" is a song recorded by American country music artist Brad Paisley that features on his thirteenth studio album Son of the Mountains. The song was released on September 29, 2023, alongside the title track, with both being included on Paisley's extended play The First Four Tracks. Paisley co-wrote the song with Lee Thomas Miller, and co-produced it with Luke Wooten, describing it as his favorite song he's ever written, with the lyrics highlighting the Opioid epidemic in the United States and how people in his home state of West Virginia have been impacted by it.

== Content ==
Discussing the song with Variety, Paisley explained that it was the idea of his co-writer Lee Thomas Miller to write the song, and that it made sense for the two of them to write it together because Miller's native Kentucky has been equally affected by the opioid crisis. Paisley was initially apprehensive about releasing the song, noting “when we sat down to write about this, in my mind, I just thought, “I don’t know how good a song this will be, but it could be very impactful or important. But I don’t know if it’ll be something you want to hear over and over again.” And that's the part that surprised me when we got done is, I just love the song. Like, if I didn't know better, it doesn't feel like the kind of thing that is a historical account or some sort of documentary. The record just feels like it's a type of blues; it's a type of protest song”.

Paisley stated in interviews that he believes "The Medicine Will" is his best song to date, noting “I really do believe that this might be the best song I’ve ever written. I can say that humbly. I do think that it’s as important as anything I’ve ever written — whether anything I’ve ever written is important. It feels that way because I know what it can mean to where I’m from. If you’re going to write a song about where you’re from, you want it to do some good.” Miller explained that the idea for the song came when he watched the Netflix limited series Dopesick and began to do his own research into the drug epidemic, bringing the first few lines to Paisley, who was initially skeptical of the topic's viability as a song. Once the writing was completed, Paisley recruited bluegrass musicians Dan Tyminski, Jerry Douglas, and Sierra Hull to play on the track in reference to the Appalachian foundation of West Virginia, but he wasn't strict on following bluegrass traditions and included additional instruments such as a Hammond organ and electric guitar.

=== Release ===
The decision to release "Son of the Mountains" and "The Medicine Will" simultaneously was a creative choice from Paisley, who explained that “this opioid crisis has hit my state the hardest of anywhere. It's truly something to see how this idyllic place has been affected ... I mean, it's just been brutal. I didn't want to put out 'Son of the Mountains' first because] I didn't want anyone to think I was turning a blind eye to a harsh reality. And at the same time, I'm really glad they both are coming out, because I think if you only put out 'The Medicine' right now, that'd be the whole story, but I definitely think the two of them together help set the picture for the rest of this album.”

== Live performances ==
Paisley debuted the song with Hull on mandolin and harmony vocals on Today on December 4, 2023.

== Music video ==
The video was filmed in Mount Hope, West Virginia and features interviews with local people who have been impacted by the US opioid crisis interspersed with clips of Paisley exploring the town and performing the song with Tyminski, Douglas, and his band in a coal mine. Of the video, Paisley stated “everybody that you see in that 'The Medicine Will' video is either a recovered addict or in recovery, or a first responder or a police officer or somebody who works with them, and they’re all trying to help. And to top it all off, the next thing you know, we’re 500 feet underground, performing the song in a coal mine. That was an idea I had when we first did it. I thought, there’s nothing that conveys the spirit of the song more than just being buried under the ground, doing that”.

== Personnel ==
- Jerry Douglas - dobro
- Sierra Hull - mandolin, harmony vocals
- Kenny Lewis - electric bass, upright bass
- Kendal Marcy - organ
- Brad Paisley - lead vocals, backing vocals
- Richard Windmann - guitar
- Ben Sesar - drums
- Dan Tyminski - harmony vocals
