= Truliant Amphitheater =

Concert venue in Charlotte, North Carolina, US

- Interactive map of Truliant Amphitheater
- Former names: Blockbuster Pavilion (1991–2001); Verizon Wireless Amphitheatre (2001–2013); PNC Music Pavilion (2013–2026)
- Location: 707 Pavilion Blvd. Charlotte, North Carolina 28262
- Coordinates: 35.32735°N 80.711264°W
- Owner: Live Nation
- Operator: Live Nation
- Seating type: reserved, lawn
- Capacity: 19,500
- Type: Outdoor amphitheatre

Construction
- Opened: July 4, 1991

Truliant Amphitheater (originally Blockbuster Pavilion and formerly Verizon Wireless Amphitheatre & PNC Music Pavilion) is an outdoor amphitheater in Charlotte, North Carolina, that specializes in hosting large concerts. The venue largely replaced the Paladium at Carowinds as the premier outdoor venue in the Metrolina region. It was renamed under a new naming rights deal with Truliant Federal Credit Union. It has a capacity of 19,500 (7,232 seats under pavilion, 2,221 reserved seats on lawn and 10,000 general admission seats).

The amphitheater is located on Pavilion Boulevard in the University City neighborhood near the US 29/I-485 (Outerbelt) interchange. The venue is operated by Live Nation, a concert company.

The amphitheater hosts many different varieties of acts, including rock, alternative, pop, country, jazz, and rhythm and blues, along with special events and festivals of all kinds.

Former Beatle Paul McCartney's final North American concert of The New World Tour was held at the amphitheater on June 15, 1993. The show was nationally broadcast on Fox, who aired commercials in place of some live songs.

The venue gained some notoriety in 2005, when Simon Le Bon of Duran Duran referred to the city of Charlotte as "Charlotte, Virginia".

The venue is a popular stop for summer tours, usually sandwiched between shows at Raleigh's Coastal Credit Union Music Park and Atlanta's Lakewood Amphitheatre, both of which are similarly sized venues. The Vans Warped Tour, Ozzfest and other traveling festivals generally always make an appearance here.

== Events ==
List of events held at the Amphitheatre
| Artist | Event | Date | Opening act(s) |
|---|---|---|---|
| 3 Doors Down | Seventeen Days Tour | September 11, 2005 | Shinedown, Staind, Alter Bridge |
| 3 Doors Down | 2023 Tour | October 23, 2023 | |
| 5 Seconds of Summer | Rock Out with Your Socks Out Tour | September 9, 2015 | Hey Violet |
| 5 Seconds of Summer | Sounds Live Feels Live World Tour | July 18, 2016 | One Ok Rock |
| 30 Seconds to Mars | Seasons Tour | August 20, 2024 | AFI, Poppy, Kenny Hoopla |
| 50 Cent | The Final Lap Tour | August 16, 2023 | Busta Rhymes & Jeremih |
| 311 | Transistor Tour | August 31, 1997 | De La Soul |
| 311 | Summer Unity Tour | July 20, 2007 | The English Beat & Matisyahu |
| 311 | Summer Unity Tour | July 24, 2008 | Snoop Dogg & Fiction Plane |
| 311 | Summer Unity Tour | July 3, 2009 | Ziggy Marley & The Expendables |
| 311 | Summer Unity Tour | August 1, 2011 | Sublime with Rome, DJ Soulman, DJ Trichrome |
| 311 | Summer Unity Tour | July 22, 2012 | Slightly Stoopid; The Aggrolites |
| 311 | Summer Unity Tour | July 17, 2013 | Cypress Hill & G. Love & Special Sauce |
| Aaron Tippin | People Like Us Tour | October 5, 2001 | Tracy Byrd, Jo Dee Messina, Cyndi Thomson |
| Aerosmith | Get a Grip Tour | September 17, 1994 | Collective Soul |
| Aerosmith | Nine Lives Tour | September 25, 1997 | 4 Non Blondes |
| Aerosmith | Nine Lives Tour | October 5, 1998 | Fuel |
| Aerosmith | Just Push Play Tour | September 9, 2001 | Fuel |
| Aerosmith | Girls of Summer Tour | October 8, 2002 | Kid Rock, Run–D.M.C., Must |
| Aerosmith & Kiss | AeroKiss Tour | September 19, 2003 | Saliva |
| Aerosmith & Mötley Crüe | Route of All Evil Tour | September 21, 2006 | Lennon Murphy |
| Al Haymon Summer Festival Tour | Summer Festival Tour | July 21, 2012 | —N/a |
| Alabama | Farewell Tour | July 11, 2003 | —N/a |
| Alan Jackson | High Mileage Tour | May 15, 1999 | Sara Evans, Andy Griggs, Danni Leigh & Clint Daniels |
| Alan Jackson | Drive Tour | April 20, 2002 | Rascal Flatts & Cyndi Thomson |
| Alan Jackson | What I Do Tour | May 15, 2004 | Martina McBride |
| Alan Jackson | 2005 Tour | May 5, 2005 | Sara Evans |
| Alan Jackson | Good Time Tour | August 21, 2009 | Josh Turner |
| Alanis Morissette | Can't Not Tour | September 10, 1996 | K's Choice |
| Alanis Morissette | 2021 World Tour: Celebrating 25 Years of Jagged Little Pil | August 21, 2021 | Garbage & Cat Power |
| Alanis Morissette | The Triple Moon Tour | June 26, 2024 | Joan Jett & Morgan Wade |
| Alanis Morissette & Tori Amos | 5 1/2 Weeks Tour | August 24, 1999 | —N/a |
| The Allman Brothers Band | Where It All Begins Tour | July 2, 1994 | Screamin' Cheetah Wheelies & Big Head Todd and the Monsters |
| The Allman Brothers Band | 1995 Tour | July 28, 1995 | Chris Anderson Band & DAG |
| The Allman Brothers Band | 1996 Tour | July 5, 1996 | Edwin McCain Band & Jupiter Coyote |
| The Allman Brothers Band | 1997 Tour | July 5, 1997 | Cry of Love & Mark May and The Agitators |
| The Allman Brothers Band | 1998 Tour | July 4, 1998 | Jason & the Scorchers & Robert Bradley's Blackwater Surprise |
| The Allman Brothers Band | 1999 Tour | July 3, 1999 | Hot Tuna & Jupiter Coyote |
| The Allman Brothers Band | 2000 Tour | June 18, 2000 | Kenny Wayne Shepherd & Pat McGee Band |
| The Allman Brothers Band | 2001 Tour | August 4, 2001 | Phil Lesh and Friends & Susan Tedeschi |
| The Allman Brothers Band | 2002 Tour | August 23, 2002 | Galactic |
| The Allman Brothers Band | Hittin' the Note Tour | August 9, 2003 | Karl Denson's Tiny Universe |
| The Allman Brothers Band | 2004 Tour | October 2, 2004 | Lynyrd Skynyrd |
| The Allman Brothers Band | 2005 Tour | October 2, 2005 | moe. |
| The Allman Brothers Band | 2007 Tour | August 10, 2007 | Drive-By Truckers & JJ Grey & MOFRO |
| The Allman Brothers Band | 2008 Tour | October 4, 2008 | Phil Lesh and Friends |
| The Allman Brothers Band | 40th Anniversary Tour | October 3, 2009 | Widespread Panic |
| The Allman Brothers Band | 40th Anniversary Tour | October 4, 2009 | Widespread Panic |
| The Allman Brothers Band | 2012 Tour | August 3, 2012 | Lynyrd Skynyrd |
| The Allman Brothers Band | 2013 Tour | August 31, 2013 | Steve Winwood |
| Aly & AJ | NextFest Tour | August, 2007 | Drake Bell, Corbin Bleu, Bianca Ryan |
| America's Most Wanted Music Festival | | September 4, 2009 | —N/a |
| America's Most Wanted Music Festival | | July 26, 2013 | —N/a |
| American Bang | 2008 Tour | September 17, 2008 | —N/a |
| American Idol | American Idols LIVE! Tour 2010 | July 25, 2010 | —N/a |
| An Avett Jubilee | — | August 27, 2006 | —N/a |
| Anti-Flag | 2004 Tour | July 2, 2004 | Taking Back Sunday |
| The Automatic | 2007 Tour | July 24, 2007 | —N/a |
| Avril Lavigne | Bonez Tour | August 23, 2005 | Gavin DeGraw & Butch Walker |
| Avril Lavigne | Greatest Hits Tour | September 1, 2024 | Simple Plan & Girlfriends |
| Backstreet Boys | In a World Like This Tour | August 21, 2013 | Jesse McCartney & DJ Pauly D |
| Backstreet Boys | DNA World Tour | June 24, 2022 | Delta Goodrem |
| Bad Company & Joe Walsh | One Hell of a Night Tour | June 30, 2016 | Steve Rodgers |
| Barenaked Ladies | Stunt Tour | August 8, 1999 | The Beautiful South |
| Barenaked Ladies | Maroon Tour | August 1, 2001 | Vertical Horizon & Sarah Harmer |
| Barry Manilow | The Greatest Hits and Then Some... Tour | August 2, 1993 | —N/a |
| The Beach Boys | 2000 Tour | July 6, 2000 | Four Tops |
| Big Time Rush | Big Time Summer Tour | August 29, 2012 | Cody Simpson & Rachel Crow |
| Big Time Rush | Can't Get Enough Tour | June 27, 2023 | Jax & Max Schneider |
| Big Time Rush & Victoria Justice | Summer Break Tour | July 9, 2013 | Jackson Guthy |
| Big Tymers | Hood Rich Tour | October 10, 2002 | Nelly, Lil Wayne, Amerie |
| The Black Crowes & Lenny Kravitz | By Your Side Tour | May 18, 1999 | —N/a |
| The Black Crowes | 2006 Tour | July 11, 2006 | Drive-By Truckers & Robert Randolph and the Family Band |
| The Black Keys | Dropout Boogie Tour | July 27, 2022 | Band of Horses & Ceramic Animal |
| Blake Shelton | Ten Times Crazier Tour | August 29, 2014 | Neal McCoy, The Band Perry, Dan + Shay |
| Blink-182 & Green Day | Pop Disaster Tour | May 20, 2002 | Jimmy Eat World |
| Blink-182 | Blink-182 Tour | May 11, 2004 | Cypress Hill & Taking Back Sunday |
| Blink-182 | 2009 Reunion Tour | June 6, 2009 | Asher Roth & Valencia |
| Blink-182 | 2009 Reunion Tour | October 6, 2009 | Weezer, The All-American Rejects; Fall Out Boy, Chester French |
| Blink-182 & Lil Wayne | Blink-182 and Lil Wayne Tour | July 23, 2019 | Neck Deep |
| Bob Dylan | Never Ending Tour 1993 | September 17, 1993 | Santana |
| Bob Dylan | Never Ending Tour 1999 | September 5, 1999 | Paul Simon |
| Bob Segar & the Silver Bullet Band | Roll Me Away: The Final Tour | May 16, 2019 | Grand Funk Railroad |
| Bobby Womack | 2002 Tour | June 22, 2002 | Rick James & Lakeside |
| Bon Jovi | I'll Sleep When I'm Dead Tour | July 16, 1993 | Extreme |
| Bon Jovi | These Days Tour | September 19, 1995 | —N/a |
| Bonnie Raitt | Silver Lining Tour | July 27, 2002 | Lyle Lovett |
| Boston | Livin' For You Tour | June 23, 1995 | —N/a |
| Boston | 1997 Tour | July 27, 1997 | —N/a |
| Boston | Corporate America Tour | June 28, 2003 | —N/a |
| Bounce TV Music Festival | | August 2, 2013 | —N/a |
| Bounce TV Music Festival | | September 13, 2014 | —N/a |
| Boyz II Men | 2024 Tour | September 7, 2024 | Robin Thicke |
| Boy George, Culture Club, & The B-52's | Life Tour | July 21, 2018 | Thompson Twins & Tom Bailey |
| Boys Like Girls | 2007 Tour | July 22, 2007 | —N/a |
| Brad Paisley | Time Well Wasted Tour | June 17, 2006 | Sara Evans & Eric Church |
| Brad Paisley | Bonfires & Amplifiers Tour | July 21, 2007 | Kellie Pickler, Taylor Swift, Jack Ingram |
| Brad Paisley | Paisley Party Tour | July 18, 2008 | Jewel, Chuck Wicks; Julianne Hough |
| Brad Paisley | American Saturday Night Tour | June 5, 2009 | Dierks Bentley & Jimmy Wayne |
| Brad Paisley | H2O Tour | August 27, 2010 | Darius Rucker, Justin Moore; Josh Thompson, Easton Corbin, Steel Magnolia |
| Brad Paisley | Virtual Reality World Tour | September 14, 2012 | The Band Perry, Scotty McCreery, Love and Theft, Jana Kramer, Kristen Kelly |
| Brad Paisley | Beat This Summer Tour | June 7, 2013 | Chris Young & Lee Brice |
| Brad Paisley | Country Nation World Tour | September 19, 2014 | Randy Houser, Charlie Worsham, Leah Turner |
| Brad Paisley | Crushin' It World Tour | May 31, 2015 | Justin Moore & Mickey Guyton |
| Brad Paisley | Life Amplified World Tour | September 17, 2016 | Tyler Farr & Maddie & Tae |
| Brad Paisley | Brad Paisley 2021 Tour | August 28, 2021 | Jimmie Allen; Kameron Marlowe |
| Brantley Gilbert | Take It Outside Tour | June 24, 2016 | Justin Moore & Colt Ford |
| Brantley Gilbert | The Devil Don't Sleep Tour | July 7, 2017 | Tyler Farr & Luke Combs |
| Britney Spears | Oops!... I Did It Again Tour | September 13, 2000 | Innosense & BBMak |
| Brooks & Dunn | Neon Circus & Wild West Show Tour | June 2, 2001 | Toby Keith, Keith Urban, Montgomery Gentry |
| Brooks & Dunn | Neon Circus & Wild West Show Tour | June 15, 2002 | Gary Allan, Chris Cagle, Dwight Yoakam, Trick Pony |
| Brooks & Dunn | Neon Circus & Wild West Show Tour | June 13, 2003 | Rascal Flatts, Brad Paisley, Cledus T. Judd |
| Brooks & Dunn | Neon Circus & Wild West Show Tour | October 15, 2004 | Montgomery Gentry; Gretchen Wilson |
| Brooks & Dunn | Neon Circus & Wild West Show Tour | August 26, 2005 | Big & Rich; The Warren Brothers; Cowboy Troy |
| Brooks & Dunn | Long Haul Tour | May 12, 2006 | Jack Ingram & Sugarland |
| Brooks & Dunn | 2007 Tour | May 11, 2007 | Alan Jackson, Jake Owen & Catherine Britt |
| Brooks & Dunn | Cowboy Town Tour | September 5, 2008 | ZZ Top & Rodney Atkins |
| Brooks & Dunn | Last Rodeo Tour | June 4, 2010 | Jason Aldean & Tyler Dickerson |
| Budweiser Superfest Tour | | July 31, 1999 | —N/a |
| Budweiser Superfest Tour | | July 31, 2008 | —N/a |
| Bryan Adams | 11 Tour | July 19, 2008 | Foreigner |
| Cage the Elephant | Neon Pill Tour | August 4, 2024 | Bakar, Young the Giant, Vlad Holiday |
| Carole King | Living Room Tour | July 19, 2005 | Vienna Teng |
| Carnival of Madness | Carnival of Madness Tour | July 24, 2010 | —N/a |
| Carnival of Madness | Carnival of Madness Tour | September 13, 2011 | —N/a |
| Carnival of Madness | Carnival of Madness Tour | August 8, 2012 | —N/a |
| Carnival of Madness | Carnival of Madness Tour | August 30, 2013 | —N/a |
| Chance the Rapper | Be Encouraged Tour | June 8, 2017 | King Louie & DJ Oreo |
| Charlie Daniels Band | Volunteer Jam Tour | May 11, 2001 | .38 Special & Dickey Betts; Great Southern |
| Charlotte Blues Festival | | September 13, 1992 | —N/a |
| Charlotte Blues Festival | | September 23, 2000 | —N/a |
| Charlotte Blues Festival | | September 28, 2001 | —N/a |
| Charlotte Funk Fest | | August 12, 2017 | —N/a |
| Chicago | Twenty 1 Tour | July 17, 1991 | The Triplets |
| Chicago | 1999 Tour | July 18, 1999 | The Doobie Brothers |
| Chicago | 2002 Tour | June 7, 2002 | —N/a |
| Chicago | 2005 Tour | August 6, 2005 | —N/a |
| Chicago | Chicago XXX Tour | July 14, 2006 | Huey Lewis and the News |
| Chicago | 2021 Tour | June 29, 2021 | —N/a |
| Chicago & Brian Wilson | Summer 2022 Tour | July 1, 2022 | Al Jardine & Blondie Chaplin |
| Chicago & The Doobie Brothers | The Tour 2017 | June 24, 2017 | —N/a |
| Chicago & Earth, Wind, & Fire | Heart & Soul Tour | August 13, 2024 | |
| Chicago & REO Speedwagon | 2018 World Tour | July 15, 2018 | —N/a |
| The Chicks | Top of the World Tour | October 10, 2003 | The Suburbs |
| The Chicks | DCX MMXVI World Tour | August 13, 2016 | Vintage Trouble; Smooth Hound Smith |
| The Chicks | The Chicks Tour | July 14, 2022 | Patty Griffin |
| Chris Brown | Up Close & Personal Tour | September 10, 2006 | Lil Wayne, Juelz Santana, Dem Franchize Boyz & Ne-Yo |
| Chris Brown | F.A.M.E. Tour | October 8, 2011 | T-Pain, Tyga, Kelly Rowland |
| Chris Brown & Lil Baby | One of Them Ones Tour | August 9, 2022 | —N/a |
| Chris Stapleton | All American Roadshow | May 13, 2017 | Brothers Osborne & Lucie Silvas |
| Chris Stapleton | All American Roadshow | August 12, 2021 | Kendell Marvel |
| Chris Tomlin, Bethel Music & Kari Jobe | Live in Concert Summer 2021 | August 27, 2021 | —N/a |
| Chris Young | Raised on Country Tour | May 17, 2019 | Chris Janson & Dylan Scott |
| Christina Aguilera | Christina Aguilera in Concert | September 18, 2000 | Destiny's Child, soulDecision, Sygnature |
| Coldplay | Twisted Logic Tour | September 9, 2005 | Rilo Kiley |
| Coldplay | Viva la Vida Tour | August 7, 2009 | Elbow & Kitty, Daisy & Lewis |
| Counting Crows | Recovering the Satellites Tour | August 8, 1997 | The Wallflowers & that dog. |
| Counting Crows | Hard Candy Tour | September 2, 2003 | John Mayer |
| Counting Crows | Saturday Nights & Sunday Mornings Tour | July 28, 2008 | Maroon 5 & Sara Bareilles |
| Counting Crows & Rob Thomas | Summer 2016 Tour | July 27, 2016 | K. Phillips |
| Country Throwdown | Country Throwdown Tour | May 26, 2010 | —N/a |
| Country Throwdown | Country Throwdown Tour | April 27, 2012 | —N/a |
| Creed | Weathered Tour | July 15, 2002 | Jerry Cantrell & 12 Stones |
| Creed | Full Circle Reunion Tour | September 5, 2009 | Staind & Like a Storm |
| Creed | Summer of '99 Tour | July 24, 2024 | 3 Doors Down & Finger Eleven |
| Crosby, Stills & Nash | 1992 Tour | July 3, 1992 | —N/a |
| Crüe Fest | Crüe Fest | July 5, 2008 | —N/a |
| Crüe Fest | Crüe Fest 2 | August 30, 2009 | —N/a |
| The Cult | Cult Rising Reunion Tour | August 15, 2000 | —N/a |
| Culture Club | Big Re–Wind Reunion Tour | July 25, 1998 | The Human League; Howard Jones |
| Culture Club | The Letting It Go Show | July 19, 2023 | Berlin & Howard Jones |
| The Cure | 2016 North American Tour | June 23, 2016 | The Twilight Sad |
| Dan Fogelberg | 1992 Tour | August 19, 1992 | —N/a |
| Dan + Shay | The Heartbreak on the Map Tour | August 16, 2024 | Jake Owen & Dylan Marlowe |
| Dance Gavin Dance | Downtown Battle Mountain II Tour | July 27, 2011 | —N/a |
| Darius Rucker | Southern Style Tour | August 29, 2015 | Brett Eldredge, Brothers Osborne, A Thousand Horses |
| Darius Rucker | Good for a Good Time Tour | August 27, 2016 | Dan + Shay & Michael Ray |
| Daughtry & Goo Goo Dolls | Daughtry/Goo Goo Dolls Summer Tour | July 9, 2014 | Plain White T's |
| Dave Matthews Band | Under the Table and Dreaming Tour | July 23, 1995 | The Samples & Dionne Farris |
| Dave Matthews Band | Crash Tour | September 1, 1996 | Corey Harris |
| Dave Matthews Band | 1997 Tour | June 18, 1997 | Béla Fleck and the Flecktones |
| Dave Matthews Band | Before These Crowded Streets Tour | August 21, 1998 | Herbie Hancock & The Headhunters |
| Dave Matthews Band | 1999 Tour | July 30, 1999 | Boy Wonder |
| Dave Matthews Band | 2000 Tour | September 2, 2000 | Taj Mahal; The Phantom Blues Band |
| Dave Matthews Band | Everyday Tour | May 1, 2001 | Terrance Simien and the Zydeco Experience |
| Dave Matthews Band | Busted Stuff Tour | July 12, 2002 | North Mississippi Allstars |
| Dave Matthews Band | 2003 Tour | September 16, 2003 | Donavon Frankenreiter Band |
| Dave Matthews Band | 2004 Tour | July 24, 2004 | Robert Earl Keen |
| Dave Matthews Band | Stand Up Tour | June 28, 2005 | Drive-By Truckers |
| Dave Matthews Band | 2006 Tour | June 20, 2006 | Animal Liberation Orchestra |
| Dave Matthews Band | 2007 Tour | September 19, 2007 | Robert Earl Keen |
| Dave Matthews Band | 2008 Tour | July 1, 2008 | Michael Franti & Spearhead |
| Dave Matthews Band | Big Whiskey & the GrooGrux King Tour | April 24, 2009 | The Avett Brothers |
| Dave Matthews Band | 2010 Tour | July 21, 2010 | Amos Lee |
| Dave Matthews Band | 2012 Tour | May 23, 2012 | The Head and the Heart |
| Dave Matthews Band | Summer Tour 2013 | July 24, 2013 | John Butler Trio |
| Dave Matthews Band | Summer Tour 2014 | July 22, 2014 | —N/a |
| Dave Matthews Band | Summer Tour 2016 | May 27, 2016 | —N/a |
| Dave Matthews Band | Summer Tour 2018 | July 24, 2018 | —N/a |
| Dave Matthews Band | Summer Tour 2019 | July 19, 2019 | —N/a |
| Dave Matthews Band | Summer Tour 2021 | July 24, 2021 | —N/a |
| Dave Matthews Band | Summer Tour 2022 | May 20, 2022 | —N/a |
| The Dead | Wave That Flag Tour | August 18, 2004 | Warren Haynes Band |
| Dead & Company | Dead & Company Summer Tour 2016 | June 10, 2016 | —N/a |
| Dead & Company | Dead & Company Summer Tour 2019 | June 28, 2019 | —N/a |
| Dead & Company | Dead & Company Summer Tour 2021 | October 11, 2021 | —N/a |
| Dead & Company | The Final Tour: Summer 2023 | May 30, 2023 | —N/a |
| Def Leppard | Seven Day Weekend Tour | September 8, 1993 | —N/a |
| Def Leppard | Slang World Tour | July 27, 1996 | —N/a |
| Def Leppard | Euphoria World Tour | September 20, 2000 | —N/a |
| Def Leppard | X World Tour | April 19, 2003 | Ricky Warwick |
| Def Leppard | Yeah! Tour | July 15, 2006 | Journey & Stoll Vaughan |
| Def Leppard | Downstage Thrust Tour | August 22, 2007 | Styx & Foreigner |
| Def Leppard | Songs from the Sparkle Lounge Tour | August 8, 2009 | Poison & Cheap Trick |
| Def Leppard | Mirrorball Tour | June 22, 2011 | Heart |
| Def Leppard | Rock of Ages Tour | August 11, 2012 | Poison & Lita Ford |
| Deftones | White Pony Tour | September 23, 2000 | —N/a |
| Deftones | Back to School Tour | September 6, 2001 | Puddle of Mudd |
| Destiny's Child | Total Request Live Tour | August 17, 2001 | 3LW, Dream, City High, Eve, Nelly and the St. Lunatics |
| Destiny's Child | Destiny Fulfilled... and Lovin' It Farewell Tour | July 22, 2005 | Mario, Amerie, Tyra Bolling |
| Dierks Bentley | Riser Tour | May 9, 2014 | Chris Young & Chase Rice |
| Dierks Bentley | Sounds of Summer Tour | July 17, 2015 | Kip Moore, Maddie & Tae, Canaan Smith |
| Dierks Bentley | Somewhere on a Beach Tour | July 27, 2016 | Randy Houser, Cam, Tucker Beathard |
| Dierks Bentley | What the Hell World Tour | June 25, 2017 | Cole Swindell & Jon Pardi |
| Dierks Bentley | Burning Man Tour | August 8, 2019 | Jon Pardi, Tenille Townes, Hot Country Knights |
| Dierks Bentley | Gravel & Gold Tour | June 17, 2023 | Elle King |
| The Doobie Brothers | Brotherhood Tour | August 24, 1991 | —N/a |
| The Doobie Brothers | 1995 Tour | August 3, 1995 | —N/a |
| The Doobie Brothers | 2009 Tour | June 20, 2009 | Bad Company |
| The Doobie Brothers | 50th Anniversary Tour | July 25, 2022 | Michael McDonald |
| The Doobie Brothers | The 2024 Tour | July 30, 2024 | Steve Winwood |
| Don Henley | Summer Tour 1991 | July 27, 1991 | Susanna Hoffs |
| Don Henley | Inside Job Tour | September 3, 2000 | —N/a |
| Drake | Club Paradise Tour | May 19, 2012 | J. Cole, Waka Flocka Flame, 2 Chainz, French Montana |
| Duran Duran | Dilate Your Mind Tour | July 21, 1993 | Terence Trent D'Arby |
| Duran Duran | Let It Flow Tour | August 26, 1999 | Erin Evermore |
| Duran Duran | Astronaut World Tour | July 20, 2005 | Stimulator |
| Duran Duran | The Paper Gods Tour | April 16, 2016 | Chic feat. Nile Rodgers |
| Eagles | Hell Freezes Over Reunion Tour | August 26, 1994 | —N/a |
| Eagles | Hell Freezes Over Reunion Tour | August 27, 1994 | —N/a |
| Eagles | Hell Freezes Over Reunion Tour | April 8, 1995 | —N/a |
| Earth, Wind & Fire | 2001 Tour | September 8, 2001 | Rufus |
| Earth, Wind & Fire | 2004 Tour | July 10, 2004 | Chicago |
| Earth, Wind & Fire | 2006 Tour | September 1, 2006 | Chris Botti |
| Earth, Wind & Fire | Tour | June 24, 2010 | —N/a |
| Elton John | The One Tour | August 14, 1992 | —N/a |
| Elton John | Made in England Tour | August 6, 1995 | —N/a |
| Elton John | Follow the Yellow Brick Road Tour | June 14, 2014 | —N/a |
| Enrique Iglesias | Don't Turn Off The Lights Tour | September 20, 2002 | Paulina Rubio |
| Evanescence | Fallen World Tour | July 29, 2004 | Three Days Grace, Breaking Benjamin, Seether |
| Evanescence | Synthesis Tour | July 20, 2018 | Lindsey Stirling |
| Fall Out Boy | So Much For (Tour) Dust | July 21, 2023 | Bring Me the Horizon, Royal & the Serpent, Carr |
| Fall Out Boy & Paramore | Monumentour | July 23, 2014 | New Politics |
| Fall Out Boy & Wiz Khalifa | The Boys of Zummer Tour | July 19, 2015 | Hoodie Allen |
| Femi Kuti | Fight to Win Tour | October 12, 2001 | —N/a |
| Five Finger Death Punch | 5FDP Tour | September 6, 2022 | Megadeth, Fire From the Gods, The HU |
| Fleetwood Mac | Time Tour | August 12, 1995 | REO Speedwagon, Pat Benatar, Rare Earth |
| Fleetwood Mac | Say You Will Tour | May 20, 2004 | —N/a |
| Florida Georgia Line | Anything Goes Tour | August 14, 2015 | Thomas Rhett & Frankie Ballard |
| Florida Georgia Line | Dig Your Roots Tour | September 10, 2016 | Cole Swindell, The Cadillac Three, Kane Brown |
| Florida Georgia Line | Smooth Tour | August 3, 2017 | Nelly, Chris Lane & Ryan Hurd |
| Florida Georgia Line | Can't Say I Ain't Country Tour | July 27, 2019 | Dan + Shay, Morgen Wallen, & Hardy |
| Foghat | 1998 Tour | May 30, 1998 | —N/a |
| Foreigner | Unusual Heat Tour | September 12, 1991 | |
| Foreigner | 30th Anniversary Tour | June 16, 2007 | —N/a |
| Foreigner | 40th Anniversary Tour | August 5, 2017 | Cheap Trick & Jason Bonham's Led Zeppelin Experience |
| Foreigner | Jukebox Heroes Tour | July 4, 2018 | Whitesnake & Jason Bonham's Led Zeppelin Experience |
| Foreigner | The Historic Farewell Tour | August 9, 2023 | Loverboy |
| The Fray | The Fray Tour | June 13, 2009 | Jack's Mannequin |
| Furthur Festival | | June 22, 1996 | —N/a |
| Furthur Festival | | June 23, 1997 | —N/a |
| Furthur Festival | | June 26, 1998 | —N/a |
| Furthur Festival | | July 26, 2002 | —N/a |
| Future | Nobody Safe Tour | May 14, 2017 | A$AP Ferg, Migos, Tory Lanez |
| G-Eazy & Logic | The Endless Summer Tour | July 19, 2016 | Yo Gotti |
| George Strait | Troubadour Tour | May 15, 2009 | Blake Shelton & Julianne Hough |
| Gin Blossoms | 1994 Tour | September 25, 1994 | Spin Doctors & Cracker |
| Glass Animals | Tour of Earth | August 15, 2024 | Kevin Abstract |
| Godsmack | The Best of Times Tour | May 21, 2023 | I Prevail & Austin Meade |
| Goo Goo Dolls | 1999 Tour | September 1, 1999 | Sugar Ray & Fastball |
| Goo Goo Dolls | 20th Anniversary Tour | August 29, 2006 | Counting Crows & Eliot Morris |
| Gov't Mule | The Deep End, Volume 1 Tour | May 16, 2002 | —N/a |
| Gov't Mule | Dark Side of the Mule Tour | August 11, 2023 | Jason Bonham's Led Zeppelin Evening |
| Green Day | The Saviors Tour | August 26, 2024 | Rancid & The Linda Lindas |
| Gwen Stefani | The Sweet Escape Tour | May 12, 2007 | Akon & Lady Sovereign |
| Gwen Stefani | This Is What the Truth Feels Like Tour | July 23, 2016 | Eve |
| Halestorm & I Prevail | Summer 2024 North American Tour | August 3, 2024 | Fit for a King & Hollywood Undead |
| Hall & Oates | 2004 Tour | June 29, 2004 | Michael McDonald & Average White Band |
| Hall & Oates | 2016 Tour | May 24, 2016 | Sharon Jones & The Dap-Kings, Trombone Shorty, Orleans Avenue |
| Halsey | Love and Power Tour | May 27, 2022 | Beabadoobee & PinkPantheress |
| Halsey | For My Last Trick: The Tour | May 28, 2025 | Alvvays & Hope Tala |
| Hank Williams Jr. | Maverick Tour | April 4, 1992 | —N/a |
| Hank Williams Jr. | Rowdy Frynds Tour | September 7, 2007 | Lynyrd Skynyrd & .38 Special |
| Hank Williams Jr. | Live in Concert | August 9, 2024 | Old Crow Medicine Show |
| Hanson | Albertane Tour | August 9, 1998 | Admiral Twin |
| Heart | Heartbreaker Tour | June 21, 2013 | Jason Bonham's Led Zeppelin Experience |
| Heart, Joan Jett & the Blackhearts, Cheap Trick | Rock Hall Three for All | September 16, 2016 | —N/a |
| Heart, Joan Jett & the Blackhearts | Love Alive Tour | August 14, 2019 | Elle King |
| Honda Civic Tour | 6th Annual Honda Civic Tour; Fall Out Boy | June 13, 2007 | Phantom Planet, The Donnas, The Thrills |
| Honda Civic Tour | 10th Annual Honda Civic Tour; Paramore | September 20, 2011 | Tegan & Sara; New Found Glory, Kadawatha |
| Honda Civic Tour | 12th Annual Honda Civic Tour; Maroon 5 & Kelly Clarkson | September 11, 2013 | Tony Lucca |
| H.O.R.D.E. Festival | | August 29, 1996 | —N/a |
| H.O.R.D.E. Festival | | August 15, 1997 | —N/a |
| H.O.R.D.E. Festival | | August 15, 1998 | —N/a |
| Hozier | Unreal Unearth Tour | April 23, 2024 | Allison Russell |
| I Am the Avalanche | 2006 Tour | August 7, 2006 | Chin Up Chin Up |
| Identity Festival | | August 16, 2011 | —N/a |
| Imagine Dragons | Night Visions Tour | May 7, 2013 | The Envy Corps & Paper Route |
| Imagine Dragons | Loom World Tour | August 28, 2024 | Cannons |
| Incubus | A Crow Left of the Murder... Tour | October 4, 2004 | Ben Kweller |
| Incubus | Monuments and Melodies Tour | August 12, 2009 | The Duke Spirit |
| Incubus | If Not Now, When? Tour | September 16, 2011 | Young the Giant |
| Incubus | 8 Tour | July 11, 2017 | Jimmy Eat World; Judah and the Lion |
| Incubus/Deftones | 2015 Tour | August 9, 2015 | Death from Above 1979; The Bots |
| Iron Maiden | Fear of the Dark Tour | July 12, 1992 | Testament; Corrosion of Conformity |
| Iron Maiden | Maiden England World Tour | June 21, 2012 | Alice Cooper |
| Iron Maiden | The Book of Souls World Tour | June 9, 2017 | Ghost |
| Iron Maiden | Legacy of the Beast Tour | July 22, 2019 | The Raven Age |
| J. Cole | Forest Hills Drive Tour | August 12, 2015 | Big Sean, YG, Jeremih |
| Jack Johnson | Jack Johnson World Tour 2010 | August 22, 2010 | G. Love & Special Sauce; Animal Liberation Orchestra |
| Jack Johnson | Meet the Moonlight Tour | August 23, 2022 | Ziggy Marley |
| Jagged Edge | Hard Tour | May 23, 2004 | Ginuwine |
| James Taylor | 1996 Tour | August 30, 1996 | —N/a |
| James Taylor | Hourglass Tour | August 27, 1997 | —N/a |
| James Taylor | James Taylor: Pull Over Tour | June 8, 2001 | —N/a |
| James Taylor | October Road Tour | May 30, 2003 | Sally Anthony |
| James Taylor | 2005 Tour | July 30, 2005 | Kyler England |
| James Taylor | 2008 Tour | May 29, 2008 | —N/a |
| James Taylor | 2014 Tour | August 3, 2014 | —N/a |
| Jane's Addiction | Jubilee Tour | October 12, 2001 | —N/a |
| Jane's Addiction | Strays Tour | August 16, 2003 | —N/a |
| Janet Jackson | The Velvet Rope Tour | September 4, 1998 | Usher |
| Janet Jackson | Unbreakable World Tour | September 18, 2015 | —N/a |
| Janet Jackson | State of the World Tour | August 3, 2018 | —N/a |
| Janet Jackson | Together Again | May 12, 2023 | Ludacris |
| Janet Jackson | Together Again | July 14, 2024 | Nelly |
| Jason Aldean | My Kinda Party Tour | September 9, 2011 | Chris Young; Thompson Square |
| Jason Aldean | My Kinda Party Tour | July 26, 2012 | Luke Bryan |
| Jason Aldean | Night Train Tour | September 12, 2013 | Jake Owen & Thomas Rhett |
| Jason Aldean | Burn It Down Tour | September 5, 2014 | Florida Georgia Line; Tyler Farr |
| Jason Aldean | Burn It Down Tour | September 4, 2015 | Cole Swindell |
| Jason Aldean | Six String Circus Tour | September 29, 2016 | Thomas Rhett; A Thousand Horses |
| Jason Aldean | They Don't Know Tour | July 13, 2017 | Chris Young, Kane Brown, Dee Jay Silver |
| Jason Aldean | Back in the Saddle Tour | August 20, 2021 | Hardy & Lainey Wilson |
| Jason Aldean | Rock and Roll Cowboy Tour | July 29, 2022 | Gabby Barrett & John Morgan |
| Jason Aldean | Highway Desperado Tour | August 10, 2023 | Mitchell Tenpenny, Corey Kent; Dee Jay Silver |
| Jason Mraz | Tour Is a Four Letter Word Tour | August 21, 2012 | Christina Perri |
| Jay Z & 50 Cent | Rock the Mic Tour | August 10, 2003 | Busta Rhymes, Fabolous, Chingy |
| Jeep World Outside Festival | | July 10, 2002 | —N/a |
| Jessica Simpson | Reality Tour | June 15, 2004 | Ryan Cabrera |
| Jethro Tull | 1998 Tour | October 1, 1998 | Gov't Mule |
| Jethro Tull | J-Tull Dot Com Tour | July 2, 2000 | The Chieftains |
| Jill Scott | Summer Block Party | August 24, 2011 | Mint Condition; Anthony Hamilton |
| Jimmy Buffett | Outposts Tour | August 10, 1991 | Greg "Fingers" Taylor; The Ladyfingers Revue |
| Jimmy Buffett | Outposts Tour | August 11, 1991 | Greg "Fingers" Taylor; The Ladyfingers Revue |
| Jimmy Buffett | Recession Recess Tour | June 19, 1992 | Evangeline |
| Jimmy Buffett | Recession Recess Tour | June 20, 1992 | Evangeline |
| Jimmy Buffett | Chameleon Caravan Tour | June 27, 1993 | The Iguanas |
| Jimmy Buffett | Fruitcakes on Tour | July 22, 1994 | —N/a |
| Jimmy Buffett | Domino College Tour | June 5, 1995 | —N/a |
| Jimmy Buffett | Banana Wind Tour | June 20, 1996 | —N/a |
| Jimmy Buffett | Beach House on the Moon Tour | June 1, 1999 | —N/a |
| Jimmy Buffett | Party at the End of the World Tour | June 4, 2006 | —N/a |
| Jimmy Buffett | Year of Still Here Tour | April 29, 2008 | Jake Shimabukuro |
| Jimmy Buffett | Summerzcool Tour | April 21, 2009 | —N/a |
| Jimmy Buffett | Welcome to Fin Land Tour | April 21, 2011 | —N/a |
| Jimmy Buffett | Lounging in the Lagoon Tour | June 7, 2012 | —N/a |
| Jimmy Buffett | Songs from St. Somewhere Tour | April 24, 2014 | —N/a |
| Jimmy Buffett | Workin' N' Playin' Tour | April 23, 2016 | Huey Lewis and the News |
| Jimmy Buffett | I Don't Know Tour | April 27, 2018 | Caroline Jones |
| Jimmy Buffett | Life On the Flip Side Tour | April 30, 2022 | —N/a |
| Jimmy Eat World & Third Eyed Blind | Summer Gods Tour | July 21, 2019 | Ra Ra Riot |
| John Fogerty | Premonition Tour | July 22, 1998 | Sister 7 |
| John Fogerty | 2006 Tour | July 28, 2006 | Willie Nelson |
| John Mayer | Heavier Things Tour | September 2, 2003 | Leona Naess |
| John Mayer | Continuum Tour | August 1, 2007 | Ben Folds & The Suburbs |
| John Mayer | Continuum Tour | August 19, 2008 | OneRepublic & Paramore |
| John Mayer | Battle Studies World Tour | July 6, 2010 | Train |
| John Mayer | Born and Raised World Tour | September 4, 2013 | Phillip Phillips |
| John Mayer | The Search for Everything Tour | August 15, 2017 | The Night Game |
| John Mayer Trio | 2004 Tour | August 25, 2004 | Maroon 5 & DJ Logic |
| John Mellencamp | Rural Electrification Tour | July 13, 1999 | Son Volt |
| John Mellencamp | 2005 Tour | July 26, 2005 | John Fogerty & Stoll Vaughan |
| Jonas Brothers | Burnin' Up Tour | July 29, 2008 | Demi Lovato; Avril Lavigne |
| Jonas Brothers | The Remember This Tour | October 12, 2021 | Kelsea Ballerini; Jordan McGraw |
| Journey | Trial by Fire Reunion Tour | July 14, 1999 | Foreigner |
| Journey | Arrival Tour | June 23, 2001 | Peter Frampton & John Waite |
| Journey | Revelation Tour | August 2, 2008 | Cheap Trick & Heart |
| Journey | Eclipse Tour | August 21, 2011 | Foreigner & Night Ranger |
| Journey | Eclipse Tour | June 5, 2016 | Dave Mason |
| Kansas | 1996 Tour | July 12, 1996 | Styx |
| Kansas | 2003 Tour | September 27, 2003 | —N/a |
| KC's Boogie Blast | | July 29, 2006 | —N/a |
| Keith Sweat | Roughriders Tour | August 7, 1999 | Naughty by Nature & Ginuwine |
| Keith Sweat | Rebirth Tour | August 3, 2002 | LL Cool J & B Rich |
| Keith Urban | Light the Fuse Tour | July 25, 2013 | Little Big Town & Dustin Lynch |
| Keith Urban | ripCORD World Tour | August 18, 2016 | Brett Eldredge & Maren Morris |
| Keith Urban | The Speed of Now World Tour | August 12, 2022 | Ingrid Andress |
| Kelly Clarkson | Addicted Tour | July 4, 2006 | Rooney |
| Kelly Clarkson & The Fray | 2012 Summer Tour | September 12, 2012 | Carolina Liar |
| Kenny Chesney | No Shoes, No Shirt, No Problems Tour | May 10, 2002 | Montgomery Gentry; Jamie O'Neal, Phil Vassar |
| Kenny Chesney | Margaritas N' Senorita's Tour | May 9, 2003 | Keith Urban & Chely Wright |
| Kenny Chesney | Guitars, Tiki-Bars & A Whole Lotta Love Tour | July 16, 2004 | Rascal Flatts & Uncle Kracker |
| Kenny Chesney | The Road and the Radio Tour | August 10, 2006 | Dierks Bentley & Jake Owen |
| Kenny Chesney | Flip-Flop Summer Tour | August 2, 2007 | Sugarland & Pat Green |
| Kenny Chesney | The Poets & Pirates Tour | August 21, 2008 | LeAnn Rimes, Gary Allan, Luke Bryan |
| Kenny Chesney | Goin' Coastal Tour | June 6, 2011 | Uncle Kracker, Billy Currington |
| Kenny Chesney | No Shoes Nation Tour | August 1, 2013 | Eli Young Band; Kacey Musgraves |
| Kenny Chesney | Spread the Love Tour | May 20, 2016 | Old Dominion |
| Kesha & Scissor Sisters | The Tits Out Tour | August 5, 2025 | Rose Gray |
| Kevin Gates | Only the Generals Tour | July 20, 2024 | Jeezy, Sexyy Red, NLE Choppa |
| Kid Rock | Lazy Mothafucka Tour | March 3, 2005 | —N/a |
| Kid Rock | Rock 'n' Roll Revival Tour | May 3, 2008 | Rev. Run & Peter Wolf |
| Kid Rock | Rock 'n' Rebels II Tour | July 26, 2009 | Lynyrd Skynyrd; Black Stone Cherry |
| Kid Rock | Born Free Part II Tour | August 27, 2011 | Sheryl Crow |
| Kid Rock | $20 Best Night Ever Tour | September 10, 2013 | ZZ Top & Uncle Kracker |
| Kid Rock | First Kiss Tour | July 14, 2015 | Foreigner; Packway Handle Band |
| Kid Rock | Hot September Nights Tour | September 20, 2019 | Hank Williams Jr. |
| Kid Rock | Bad Reputation Tour | June 17, 2022 | Grand Funk Railroad |
| Kidz Bop | Never Stop Tour | July 2, 2023 | —N/a |
| Kings of Leon | Come Around Sundown World Tour | September 10, 2010 | The Black Keys & The Whigs |
| Kings of Leon | Mechanical Bull Tour | September 16, 2014 | Young the Giant & Kongos |
| Kings of Leon | Walls Tour | September 27, 2017 | Dawes |
| Kings of Leon | When You See Yourself Tour | August 10, 2021 | Cold War Kids |
| KISS | Rock the Nation Tour | July 28, 2004 | Poison & ZO2 |
| KISS | The Hottest Show on Earth Tour | August 28, 2010 | The Academy Is... |
| KISS | End of the Road Tour | August 10, 2019 | David Garibaldi |
| Kiss & Mötley Crüe | The Tour | July 25, 2012 | The Treatment |
| Kiss & Def Leppard | 40th Anniversary Tour/Heroes Tour | July 19, 2014 | Kobra and the Lotus |
| Knotfest Roadshow | – | October 17, 2021 | —N/a |
| Kool & the Gang | Keepin' the Funk Alive Tour | July 22, 2016 | Bootsy Collins, Morris Day, Big Daddy Kane |
| KoЯn & Evanescence | KoЯn & Evanescence | August 31, 2022 | Paylae Royale & Dana Dentata |
| Lady Antebellum | Own The Night Tour | June 9, 2012 | Darius Rucker; Thompson Square |
| Lady Antebellum | Take Me Downtown Tour | April 26, 2014 | Billy Currington; Kacey Musgraves |
| Lady Antebellum | Wheels Up Tour | August 7, 2015 | Hunter Hayes, Sam Hunt, Gloriana |
| Lady Antebellum | You Look Good Tour | June 16, 2017 | Kelsea Ballerini & Brett Young |
| Lana Del Rey | The Endless Summer Tour | June 13, 2015 | Grimes |
| Lauryn Hill | Miseducation Tour | July 16, 1999 | The Roots |
| Lenny Kravitz | Lenny Tour | August 12, 2002 | —N/a |
| Lilith Fair | — | July 31, 1997 | —N/a |
| Lilith Fair | — | July 23, 1998 | —N/a |
| Lilith Fair | — | July 27, 1999 | —N/a |
| Lil Wayne | I Am Music II Tour | August 7, 2011 | Keri Hilson, Rick Ross, Porcelain Black, Lloyd, Far East Movement |
| Lil Wayne & Drake | Lil Wayne Vs. Drake Tour | August 30, 2014 | —N/a |
| Limp Bizkit | Loserville Tour | August 2, 2024 | Bones, No8noface, Riff Raff |
| Linkin Park & 30 Seconds to Mars | Carnivores Tour | August 12, 2014 | AFI |
| Lionel Richie | All the Hits All Night Long Tour | July 17, 2014 | CeeLo Green & The Board Memberz |
| Little Big Town & Miranda Lambert | Bandwagon Tour | July 12, 2018 | Natalie Hemby & Tenille Townes |
| Live | Throwing Copper Tour | July 26, 1995 | Buffalo Tom |
| Live | Secret Samadhi Tour | October 2, 1997 | Luscious Jackson |
| Live | The Distance to Here Tour | October 16, 2000 | Counting Crows; Bettie Serveert |
| Logic | Bobby Tarantino vs Everybody Tour | June 19, 2018 | Kyle |
| Lollapalooza | — | August 25, 1992 | —N/a |
| Lollapalooza | — | July 24, 1993 | —N/a |
| Lollapalooza | — | August 11, 1994 | —N/a |
| Lollapalooza | — | June 28, 1997 | —N/a |
| Luke Bryan | Dirt Road Diaries Tour | July 12, 2013 | Thompson Square; Florida Georgia Line |
| Luke Bryan | That's My Kind of Night Tour | May 29, 2014 | Lee Brice & Cole Swindell |
| Luke Bryan | Kick the Dust Up Tour | September 24, 2015 | Randy Houser & Dustin Lynch |
| Luke Bryan | Kill the Lights Tour | September 1, 2016 | Little Big Town & Dustin Lynch |
| Luke Bryan | Huntin', Fishin' and Lovin' Every Day Tour | August 18, 2017 | Lauren Alaina, Brett Eldredge, Craig Campbell, Adam Craig, Seth Ennis |
| Luke Bryan | What Makes You Country Tour | June 29, 2018 | Jon Pardi & Morgan Wallen |
| Luke Bryan | Sunset Repeat Tour | June 2, 2019 | Cole Swindell & Jon Langston |
| Luke Bryan | Proud to Be Right Here Tour | July 23, 2021 | Dylan Scott, Caylee Hammack, DJ Rock |
| Luke Bryan | Raised Up Right Tour | July 22, 2022 | Riley Green, Mitchell Tenpenny, DJ Rock |
| Luke Combs | Beer Never Broke My Heart Tour | July 13, 2019 | Cody Johnson |
| Luther Vandross | The BK Got Soul Tour | August 31, 2002 | Gerald Levert, Angie Stone; Michelle Williams |
| Lynyrd Skynyrd | 1991 Tour | July 20, 1991 | Junkyard |
| Lynyrd Skynyrd | 1991 Tour | May 23, 1992 | 38 Special |
| Lynyrd Skynyrd | 1994 Tour | June 10, 1994 | —N/a |
| Lynyrd Skynyrd | 1996 Tour | August 1, 1996 | —N/a |
| Lynyrd Skynyrd | 20 Tour | June 19, 1997 | —N/a |
| Lynyrd Skynyrd | 20 Tour | October 11, 1998 | —N/a |
| Lynyrd Skynyrd | Edge of Forever Tour | September 13, 2001 | Little Feat |
| Lynyrd Skynyrd | 2006 Tour | July 19, 2006 | 3 Doors Down; Shooter Jennings |
| Lynyrd Skynyrd | God & Guns Tour | June 19, 2010 | .38 Special & Bret Michaels |
| Lynyrd Skynyrd | Last of the Street Survivors Farewell Tour | June 30, 2018 | .38 Special, Hank Williams Jr., CJ Solar |
| Lynyrd Skynyrd & Bad Company | 40th Anniversaries Tour | July 13, 2013 | Black Stone Cherry |
| Lynyrd Skynyrd & Bad Company | 40th Anniversaries Tour | July 16, 2014 | The Dead Daisies |
| Lynyrd Skynyrd & ZZ Top | Sharp Dressed Simple Man Tour | September 1, 2023 | Uncle Kracker |
| The Manhattan Transfer | The Offbeat of Avenues Tour | August 9, 1992 | —N/a |
| Maroon 5 | 2024 North American Summer Tour | June 27, 2024 | Maren Morris |
| Maroon 5 & Train | 2011 Tour | August 2, 2011 | Gavin DeGraw |
| Martina McBride | The Waking Up Laughing Tour | October 3, 2008 | Jack Ingram; Jason Michael Carroll |
| Mary J. Blige | No More Drama Tour | July 13, 2002 | Tweet & Mary Mary |
| Mary J. Blige | The Breakthrough Experience Tour | July 16, 2006 | LeToya Luckett |
| Mary J. Blige | Love Soul Tour | October 8, 2008 | Robin Thicke & Dave Young |
| Mary J. Blige | The Liberation Tour | September 15, 2012 | Melanie Fiona & D'Angelo |
| Matchbox 20 | 1998 Tour | September 29, 1998 | Paula Cole |
| Matchbox 20 | More Than You Think You Are Tour | June 29, 2003 | Sugar Ray & American Hi-Fi |
| Matchbox 20 | Slow Dream Tour | July 11, 2023 | Matt Nathanson |
| Matchbox 20 & Goo Goo Dolls | 2013 Summer Tour | August 6, 2013 | Kate Earl |
| Matchbox 20 & Counting Crows | Brief History of Everything Tour | August 20, 2017 | Rivers & Rust |
| Megadeth | Destroy All Enemies Tour | September 6, 2024 | All That Remains & Mudvayne |
| Megan Thee Stallion | Hot Girl Summer Tour | July 3, 2024 | GloRilla |
| Melissa Etheridge | Yes I Am Tour | July 31, 1994 | —N/a |
| Melissa Etheridge | Lucky Tour | June 3, 2004 | —N/a |
| Metallica | Shit Hits the Sheds Tour | August 16, 1994 | —N/a |
| Metallica | Poor Re-Touring Me Tour | June 27, 1998 | Days of the New & Jerry Cantrell |
| Michael Bolton | Time, Love & Tenderness Tour | August 3, 1991 | Oleta Adams |
| Michael Bolton | Time, Love & Tenderness Tour | August 7, 1992 | Celine Dion |
| Michael W. Smith | Healing Rain Tour | September 10, 2005 | Jars of Clay & Building 429 |
| Miranda Lambert | Keeper of the Flame Tour | June 11, 2016 | Kip Moore & Brothers Osborne |
| Miranda Lambert & Dierks Bentley | Locked & Reloaded Tour | August 23, 2013 | Randy Rogers Band; Gwen Sebastian |
| The Monkees | 30th Anniversary Tour | August 11, 1996 | —N/a |
| The Moody Blues | Keys of the Kingdom Tour | May 22, 1992 | Chicago |
| The Moody Blues | 1994 Tour | July 9, 1994 | —N/a |
| The Moody Blues | Strange Times Tour | September 9, 1999 | —N/a |
| Morgan Wallen | The Dangerous Tour | June 2, 2022 | Hardy |
| Mötley Crüe | Anywhere There's Electricity Tour | July 3, 1994 | King's X |
| Mötley Crüe | Maximum Rock Tour | September 4, 1999 | Scorpions |
| Mötley Crüe | Maximum Rock Tour | July 25, 2000 | Megadeth & Anthrax |
| Mötley Crüe | Carnival of Sins Tour | September 7, 2005 | —N/a |
| Mötley Crüe | Glam-A-Geddon Tour | July 12, 2011 | Poison & New York Dolls |
| Mötley Crüe | Farewell Tour | August 19, 2014 | Alice Cooper |
| MTV Total Request Live | MTV Total Request Live Tour | August 17, 2001 | —N/a |
| Muse | 2017 North American Tour | June 15, 2017 | 30 Seconds to Mars & Missio |
| NF | Clouds Tour | October 10, 2021 | Michl |
| *NSYNC | Boys of Summer Tour | August 28, 1999 | Jordan Knight & 3rd Storee |
| Neil Young & Crazy Horse | Broken Arrow Tour | August 9, 1996 | —N/a |
| Nelly | Nellyville Tour | October 10, 2002 | Cash Money Millionaires |
| Nelly, TLC, Flo Rida | Whole Lotta Hits Tour | July 26, 2019 | —N/a |
| The Neville Brothers | Family Groove Tour | May 20, 1992 | —N/a |
| New Edition | One Love Tour | June 12, 2005 | Gerald Levert & Brian McKnight |
| New Edition | All 6 Tour | July 5, 2014 | Joe |
| New Edition | New Edition & Friends Tour | June 26, 2016 | Kenny "Babyface" Edmonds |
| New Kids on the Block | The Magic Summer Tour (2024) | July 27, 2024 | Paula Abdul & DJ Jazzy Jeff |
| Niall Horan | The Show: Live on Tour | June 6, 2024 | Del Water Gap |
| Nickelback | The Long Road Tour | July 25, 2004 | Puddle of Mudd, 3 Doors Down, 12 Stones |
| Nickelback | Dark Horse Tour | July 31, 2009 | Hinder, Papa Roach, Saving Abel |
| Nickelback | Here & Now Tour | July 27, 2012 | Bush, Seether, My Darkest Days |
| Nicki Minaj | The Pinkprint Tour | August 4, 2015 | Rae Sremmurd, Dej Loaf, Meek Mill, Tinashe |
| Nine Inch Nails | Fragility Tour | May 14, 2000 | A Perfect Circle |
| Nine Inch Nails | Live: With Teeth Tour | June 10, 2006 | TV on the Radio & Bauhaus |
| Nine Inch Nails & Jane's Addiction | Wave Goodbye Tour | June 12, 2009 | Street Sweeper Social Club |
| Nine Inch Nails & Soundgarden | 2014 Tour | August 7, 2014 | The Dillinger Escape Plan |
| No Doubt | Tragic Kingdom World Tour | May 4, 1997 | —N/a |
| No Doubt | Return of Saturn Tour | June 11, 2000 | Lit & The Black Eyed Peas |
| No Doubt | Summer Tour 2009 | June 6, 2009 | Paramore & The Sounds |
| Norah Jones | Feels Like Home Tour | August 17, 2004 | —N/a |
| The Offspring | Days Go By Tour | September 16, 2012 | Coheed and Cambria; Our Lady Peace |
| The Offspring | Let the Bad Times Roll Tour | August 18, 2023 | Simple Plan & Sum 41 |
| One Direction | Where We Are Tour | September 27, 2014 | 5 Seconds of Summer |
| One Direction | Where We Are Tour | September 28, 2014 | 5 Seconds of Summer |
| OneRepublic | Native Summer Tour | August 14, 2014 | The Script & American Authors |
| OneRepublic | Never Ending Summer Tour | September 9, 2022 | Needtobreathe & Amy Allen |
| Ozzfest | — | May 28, 1997 | —N/a |
| Ozzfest | — | June 2, 1999 | —N/a |
| Ozzfest | — | July 8, 2000 | —N/a |
| Ozzfest | — | July 17, 2001 | —N/a |
| Ozzfest | — | August 24, 2003 | —N/a |
| Ozzfest | — | September 2, 2005 | —N/a |
| Ozzfest | — | August 28, 2007 | —N/a |
| Ozzy Osbourne | No More Tears Tour | September 18, 1992 | Alice in Chains |
| Ozzy Osbourne | No More Tears Tour | September 19, 1992 | —N/a |
| Pantera | Far Beyond Driven Tour | August 6, 1994 | Prong |
| Paul McCartney | The New World Tour | June 15, 1993 | —N/a |
| Paul Simon | Born at the Right Time Tour | September 19, 1991 | —N/a |
| Patti LaBelle | Sister Soulfest Tour | August 25, 1999 | Chaka Khan |
| Pearl Jam | Binaural Tour | August 4, 2000 | Sonic Youth & Paloalto |
| Pearl Jam | Riot Act Tour | April 16, 2003 | Sleater-Kinney |
| Pentatonix | Pentatonix: The World Tour | August 13, 2023 | Lauren Alaina |
| Peso Pluma | Double P Tour | June 29, 2023 | —N/a |
| Peter, Paul and Mary | 1992 Tour | August 27, 1992 | —N/a |
| Phil Collins | Both Sides of the World Tour | June 5, 1994 | —N/a |
| Phish | The Siket Disc Tour | July 7, 1999 | The Derek Trucks Band |
| Phish | Round Room Tour | July 25, 2003 | —N/a |
| Phish | Joy Tour | July 2, 2010 | —N/a |
| Phish | 2011 Tour | June 17, 2011 | —N/a |
| Phish | 2012 Tour | August 26, 2012 | —N/a |
| Phish | 2014 Tour | July 25, 2014 | —N/a |
| Phish | 2019 Tour | June 21, 2019 | —N/a |
| Pitbull | I Feel Good Tour | October 9, 2021 | Iggy Azalea |
| Poison | 1999 Reunion Tour | July 8, 1999 | Ratt, Great White, L.A. Guns |
| Poison | Power to the People Tour | July 13, 2000 | Dokken, Cinderella, Slaughter |
| Poison | Glam, Slam, Metal Jam Tour | June 5, 2001 | Warrant, Quiet Riot & Enuff Z'nuff |
| Poison | Hollywierd World Tour | August 17, 2002 | Cinderella, Winger, Faster Pussycat |
| Poison | 20th Anniversary Tour | August 16, 2006 | Cinderella & Endeverafter |
| Poison | Poison'd! Summer Tour | June 17, 2007 | Ratt & Vains of Jenna |
| Poison | 2017 North American Tour | April 29, 2017 | Jackyl & Michael Tracy |
| Post Malone | Beerbongs & Bentleys Tour | May 16, 2018 | 21 Savage & SOB X RBE |
| The Pretenders | Last of the Independents Tour | July 2, 1998 | The B-52's |
| Projekt Revolution | — | August 14, 2004 | —N/a |
| Projekt Revolution | — | August 8, 2007 | —N/a |
| Projekt Revolution | — | July 30, 2008 | —N/a |
| Queensrÿche | Road to the Promised Land Tour | July 1, 1995 | Type O Negative |
| Queensrÿche | Hear in the Now Frontier Tour | July 25, 1997 | —N/a |
| Radiohead | In Rainbows Tour | May 9, 2008 | Liars |
| Rage Against the Machine | Evil Empire Tour | August 13, 1997 | Wu-Tang Clan; Atari Teenage Riot |
| Rascal Flatts | Here's to You Tour | September 16, 2005 | Gary Allan, Keith Anderson, Blake Shelton |
| Rascal Flatts | Me and My Gang Tour | September 15, 2006 | Blake Shelton, Eric Church, Katrina Elam |
| Rascal Flatts | Still Feels Good Tour | August 18, 2007 | Jason Aldean |
| Rascal Flatts | Bob That Head Tour | August 3, 2008 | Wendell Mobley, Neil Thrasher, Taylor Swift |
| Rascal Flatts | American Living Unstoppable Tour | August 1, 2009 | Darius Rucker & Cledus T. Judd |
| Rascal Flatts | Nothing Like This Tour | June 26, 2010 | Kellie Pickler & Chris Young |
| Rascal Flatts | Flatts Fest Tour | July 29, 2011 | Sara Evans, Justin Moore, Easton Corbin |
| Rascal Flatts | Changed Tour | August 9, 2012 | Little Big Town, Edens Edge, Eli Young Band |
| Rascal Flatts | Rewind Tour | July 26, 2014 | Sheryl Crow & Gloriana |
| Rascal Flatts | Riot Tour | July 25, 2015 | Scotty McCreery & RaeLynn |
| Rascal Flatts | Rhythm and Roots Tour | June 17, 2016 | Kelsea Ballerini & Chris Lane |
| Rascal Flatts | Back to Us Tour | June 15, 2018 | Dan + Shay & Carly Pearce |
| Rascal Flatts | Summer Playlist Tour | June 27, 2019 | Billy Currington & LoCash |
| Ray Charles | Would You Believe Tour | July 4, 1991 | —N/a |
| Reba McEntire | For My Broken Heart Tour | August 8, 1992 | —N/a |
| Reba McEntire | If You See Him Tour | July 11, 1999 | —N/a |
| Reba McEntire & Brad Paisley | 2 Hats & A Redhead Tour | April 16, 2005 | Terri Clark |
| Red Hot Chili Peppers | Californication Tour | June 9, 2000 | Foo Fighters & Kool Keith |
| Red Hot Chili Peppers | By the Way World Tour | June 6, 2003 | The Mars Volta & Snoop Dogg |
| REO Speedwagon | Building the Bridge Tour | August 24, 1996 | Foreigner & Peter Frampton |
| Richard Marx | Rush Street Tour | June 25, 1994 | —N/a |
| Rick Springfield | Karma Tour | June 6, 1999 | Smash Mouth & Fastball |
| Ringo Starr & His All-Starr Band | 1992 Tour | June 6, 1992 | —N/a |
| Rockstar Energy Disrupt Festival | 2019 Festival | June 29, 2019 | —N/a |
| Rob Zombie | Educated Horses Tour | August 31, 2006 | Godsmack & Shinedown |
| Rob Zombie | Freak On Parade Tour | July 24, 2022 | Mudvayne, Static-X, Powerman 5000 |
| Rock Never Stops | Rock Never Stops Tour | August 13, 1999 | —N/a |
| Rock the Bells Festival | — | August 5, 2006 | —N/a |
| Rock the Bells Festival | — | August 3, 2007 | —N/a |
| Rod Stewart | Vagabond Heart Tour | October 4, 1991 | |
| Rod Stewart | 2001 Tour | July 5, 2001 | —N/a |
| Rod Stewart | As Time Goes By Tour | July 6, 2004 | —N/a |
| Rod Stewart | North America Tour 2022 | August 26, 2022 | Cheap Trick |
| Roger Waters | In the Flesh Tour | June 7, 2000 | —N/a |
| RÜFÜS DU SOL | Summer 2023 Tour | August 12, 2023 | Channel Tres |
| Rush | Roll the Bones Tour | June 14, 1992 | Mr. Big |
| Rush | Vapor Trails Tour | July 1, 2002 | —N/a |
| Rush | R30: 30th Anniversary Tour | May 28, 2004 | —N/a |
| Rush | Snakes & Arrows Tour | June 18, 2007 | —N/a |
| Rush | Snakes & Arrows Tour | July 20, 2008 | —N/a |
| Sam Hunt | July 29, 2017 | 15 in a 30 Tour | Maren Morris, Chris Janson, Ryan Follese |
| Sammy Hagar | The Best of All Worlds Tour | July 19, 2024 | Loverboy |
| Sammy Hagar & The Waboritas | Heavyweight Champs of Rock 'n' Roll Tour | August 7, 2002 | David Lee Roth |
| Santana | Milagro Tour | October 25, 1992 | —N/a |
| Santana | Supernatural Tour | July 23, 2000 | Macy Gray |
| Santana | Embrace Your Light Tour | June 5, 2005 | Salvador Santana Band; Los Lonely Boys |
| Santana | Supernatural Now Tour | August 13, 2019 | The Doobie Brothers |
| Say Anything | In Defense of the Genre Tour | July 13, 2008 | —N/a |
| Scorpions | Scorpions Tour 2002 | June 21, 2002 | Deep Purple & Dio |
| Shania Twain | Come On Over Tour | June 9, 1999 | Leahy |
| Shania Twain | Queen of Me Tour | June 28, 2023 | Priscilla Block |
| Sheryl Crow | The Globe Sessions Tour | July 27, 1999 | —N/a |
| Slipknot & Marliyn Manson | North American Summer Tour | August 2, 2016 | Of Mice & Men |
| Slayer | Slayer Farewell Tour | June 14, 2018 | Anthrax, Lamb of God, Testament, Behemoth |
| Smokin' Grooves Festival | — | September 8, 1996 | —N/a |
| Smokin' Grooves Festival | — | July 12, 1997 | —N/a |
| Smokin' Grooves Festival | — | August 26, 1998 | —N/a |
| The Smashing Pumpkins | The World Is a Vampire Tour | August 22, 2023 | Interpol & Rival Sons |
| Snoop Dogg | Tha Last Meal Tour | October 3, 2001 | Bad Azz, Soopafly, Goldie Loc |
| Snoop Dogg & Wiz Khalifa | The High Road Summer Tour 2016 | July 24, 2016 | Kevin Gates, Jhené Aiko, Casey Veggies & DJ Drama |
| Snoop Dogg & Wiz Khalifa | The High School Reunion Tour | August 8, 2023 | Too Short, Berner, Warren G, DJ Drama with The Lady of Rage |
| SoulFest | — | July 28, 1999 | —N/a |
| SoulFest | — | July 21, 2000 | —N/a |
| SoulFest | — | July 14, 2001 | —N/a |
| SoulFest | — | May 3, 2002 | —N/a |
| SoulFest | — | June 21, 2003 | —N/a |
| SoulFest | — | June 19, 2004 | —N/a |
| Spice Girls | Spiceworld: The Tour | June 20, 1998 | —N/a |
| Sprite Liquid Remix | Sprite Liquid Remix Tour | August 30, 2002 | —N/a |
| Sprite Liquid Remix | Sprite Liquid Remix Tour | August 30, 2003 | —N/a |
| Steely Dan | Kamakiriad Tour | September 11, 1993 | —N/a |
| Steely Dan | Art Crimes Tour | July 10, 1996 | —N/a |
| Steely Dan | The Fab-Originees.com Tour | August 12, 2006 | Michael McDonald |
| Steely Dan | Heavy Rollers Tour | June 2, 2007 | —N/a |
| Steely Dan | Tour 2016 | July 2, 2016 | Steve Windwood |
| Steve Miller Band | 1999 Tour | August 14, 1999 | George Thorogood & The Destroyers; Curtis Salgado |
| Steven Curtis Chapman | The Abbey Road Sessions Tour | April 29, 2005 | Chris Tomlin & Casting Crowns |
| Stevie Nicks | Trouble in Shangri-La Tour | September 7, 2001 | Jeffrey Gaines |
| Stevie Nicks | Gold Dust Tour | July 9, 2005 | Vanessa Carlton |
| Stevie Nicks | Stevie Nicks on Tour 2022 | October 22, 2022 | Vanessa Carlton |
| Sting | The Soul Cages Tour | September 22, 1991 | Squeeze |
| Sting | Mercury Falling Tour | June 30, 1996 | Natalie Merchant |
| Sting | Brand New Day Tour | September 6, 2000 | Liquid Soul & Jonny Lang |
| Sting | Sacred Love Tour | September 3, 2004 | Annie Lennox |
| Stone Temple Pilots | 2008 Reunion Tour | August 17, 2008 | TAB the Band; Black Rebel Motorcycle Club |
| Strange Days Festival | — | June 11, 2005 | —N/a |
| Styx | 2000 Tour | May 24, 2000 | REO Speedwagon; Eddie Money |
| Styx | 2001 Tour | June 22, 2001 | Bad Company, Billy Squier, Joe Stark |
| Styx | Cyclorama Tour | June 17, 2004 | Peter Frampton & Nelson |
| Styx | Midwest Rock 'n' Roll Express Tour | May 17, 2012 | REO Speedwagaon; Ted Nugent |
| Styx | Soundtrack of Summer Tour | May 31, 2014 | Foreigner & Don Felder |
| Styx & Foreigner | Renegade & Juke Box Heroes Tour | July 13, 2024 | John Waite |
| Styx & Joan Jett and the Blackhearts | Summer 2018 Tour | June 13, 2018 | Tesla |
| Styx & REO Speedwagon | Live and Unzoomed Tour | August 6, 2022 | Loverboy |
| Sugar Water Festival | — | July 23, 2005 | —N/a |
| Sugarland | The Incredible Machine Tour | October 1, 2010 | Little Big Town; Randy Montana |
| $uicideboy$ | Grey Day Tour | September 22, 2022 | Ski Mask the Slump God, Snot, Code Orange |
| SummerFest | — | July 7, 2009 | —N/a |
| SWV & Xscape | Queens of R&B Tour | July 17, 2024 | Mya, 702, Total, MC Lyte |
| Taking Back Sunday | Louder Now Tour | July 9, 2006 | Angels & Airwaves, Head Automatica, The Subways |
| Tears for Fears | The Tipping Point Tour | June 13, 2022 | Garbage |
| Tedeschi Trucks Band | Wheels of Soul Tour | July 7, 2019 | Blackberry Smoke & Shovels & Rope |
| Tenacious D | The Spicy Meatball Tour | September 6, 2023 | Dave Hill |
| Tesla | Psychotic Supper Tour | May 15, 1992 | FireHouse |
| Tesla | Bust a Nut Tour | July 7, 1995 | —N/a |
| Third Eye Blind | Summer Gods Tour | July 29, 2024 | Yellowcard & ARIZONA |
| Thirty Seconds to Mars | Monolith Tour | June 27, 2018 | Walk the Moon, MisterWives, Joywave, Sir Sly |
| Three Days Grace | One-X Tour | September 28, 2007 | Breaking Benjamin, Seether, Skillet |
| Thomas Rhett | Very Hot Summer Tour | June 14, 2019 | Dustin Lynch, Russell Dickerson, Rhett Akins |
| Thomas Rhett | Center Point Road Tour | October 8, 2021 | Gabby Barrett & Cole Swindell |
| Tim McGraw | Set This Circus Down Tour | August 12, 2001 | Kenny Chesney & Mark Collie |
| Tim McGraw | Live Like You Were Dying Tour | June 13, 2004 | Big & Rich & The Warren Brothers |
| Tim McGraw | Live Your Voice Tour | May 16, 2008 | Jason Aldean & Halfway to Hazard |
| Tim McGraw | Southern Voice Tour | July 23, 2010 | Lady Antebellum, Love and Theft, Danny Gokey |
| Tim McGraw | Emotional Traffic Tour | August 11, 2011 | Luke Bryan & The Band Perry |
| Tim McGraw | Two Lanes of Freedom Tour | May 3, 2013 | Love and Theft & Brantley Gilbert |
| Tim McGraw | Sundown Heaven Town Tour | June 21, 2014 | Kip Moore & Cassadee Pope |
| Tim McGraw | Shotgun Rider Tour | July 11, 2015 | Billy Currington & Chase Bryant |
| Tim McGraw | McGraw Tour 2022 | May 12, 2022 | Russell Dickerson, Brandon Davis, Alexandra Kay |
| Tina Turner | Wildest Dreams Tour | June 18, 1997 | Cyndi Lauper |
| Toby Keith | Unleashed Tour | September 8, 2002 | Rascal Flatts & Paul Thorn |
| Toby Keith | Shock'n Y'all Tour | August 8, 2003 | Blake Shelton & Junior Brown |
| Toby Keith | Big Throwdown Tour | August 6, 2004 | Terri Clark & Scotty Emerick |
| Toby Keith | Big Throwdown II Tour | June 10, 2005 | Lee Ann Womack & Shooter Jennings |
| Toby Keith | White Trash with Money Tour | October 15, 2006 | Joe Nichols & Rushlow Harris |
| Toby Keith | Hookin' Up & Hangin' Out Tour | June 22, 2007 | Miranda Lambert, Flynnville Train, Trailer Choir |
| Toby Keith | Biggest & Baddest Tour | June 20, 2008 | Montgomery Gentry, Carter's Chord, Mica Roberts |
| Toby Keith | America's Toughest Tour | July 12, 2009 | Trace Adkins |
| Toby Keith | American Ride Tour | July 11, 2010 | Trace Adkins & James Otto |
| Toby Keith | Locked & Loaded Tour | October 7, 2011 | Eric Church & JT Hodges |
| Toby Keith | Love in Overdrive Tour | August 25, 2012 | Brantley Gilbert |
| Toby Keith | Good Times & Pick Up Lines Tour | August 21, 2015 | Eli Young Band |
| Tom Petty and the Heartbreakers | Into the Great Wide Open Tour | October 15, 1991 | Chris Whitley |
| Tom Petty and the Heartbreakers | Dogs With Wings Tour | April 14, 1995 | Pete Droge & The Jayhawks |
| Tom Petty and the Heartbreakers | Echo Tour | September 25, 1999 | The Blind Boys of Alabama |
| Tom Petty and the Heartbreakers | The Last DJ Tour | July 20, 2002 | The Brian Setzer Orchestra |
| Tom Petty and the Heartbreakers | 30th Anniversary Tour | June 9, 2006 | Stevie Nicks & Trey Anastasio Band |
| Tom Petty and the Heartbreakers | 2008 Tour | July 11, 2008 | Steve Winwood |
| Tom Petty and the Heartbreakers | Mojo Tour | September 19, 2010 | ZZ Top |
| Tony Bennett | 2001 Tour | August 3, 2001 | k.d. lang |
| Tool | Lateralus Tour | October 6, 2001 | Fantômas |
| Trace Adkins | Songs About Me Tour | May 26, 2006 | Gretchen Wilson & Blaine Larsen |
| Train | Mermaids of Alcatraz Tour | July 30, 2013 | Gavin DeGraw, The Script, Ashley Monroe |
| Train | Picasso at the Wheel Tour | June 9, 2015 | The Fray & Matt Nathanson |
| Train | Play That Song Tour | June 3, 2017 | O.A.R. & Natasha Bedingfield |
| Train | AM Gold Tour | June 30, 2022 | Jewel, Blues Traveler, Will Anderson |
| Train | I Know, It's Been A Long Time Coming Tour | August 10, 2024 | REO Speedwagon & Yacht Rock Revue |
| Train & Goo Goo Dolls | Summer Tour 2019 | July 12, 2019 | Allen Stone |
| Travis Tritt | Strong Enough Tour | September 20, 2003 | Montgomery Gentry |
| Tyler Childers | On the Road Tour | April 24, 2025 | Deer Tick |
| Uproar Festival | — | September 1, 2010 | —N/a |
| Usher | 8701 Tour | May 31, 2002 | Faith Evans |
| Van Halen | Right Here Right Now Tour | July 20, 1993 | Vince Neil Band |
| Van Halen | The Balance "Ambulance" Tour | September 2, 1995 | Skid Row, Our Lady Peace, Collective Soul |
| Van Halen | III Tour | July 30, 1998 | Kenny Wayne Shepherd |
| Van Halen | Van Halen 2015 Tour | September 11, 2015 | Kenny Wayne Shepherd Band |
| Velvet Revolver | Contraband World Tour | May 22, 2005 | Hoobastank & Modern Day Zero |
| Vince Gill | 1999 Tour | August 29, 1999 | Deana Carter |
| WAM JAM | — | October 18, 2008 | —N/a |
| Warped Tour | — | July 26, 2001 | —N/a |
| Warped Tour | — | August 6, 2002 | —N/a |
| Warped Tour | — | July 28, 2003 | —N/a |
| Warped Tour | — | August 2, 2004 | —N/a |
| Warped Tour | — | August 8, 2005 | —N/a |
| Warped Tour | — | August 8, 2006 | —N/a |
| Warped Tour | — | July 23, 2007 | —N/a |
| Warped Tour | — | July 14, 2008 | —N/a |
| Warped Tour | — | July 23, 2009 | —N/a |
| Warped Tour | — | July 22, 2010 | —N/a |
| Warped Tour | — | July 28, 2011 | —N/a |
| Warped Tour | — | July 30, 2012 | —N/a |
| Warped Tour | — | July 29, 2013 | —N/a |
| Warped Tour | — | July 28, 2014 | —N/a |
| Warped Tour | — | July 5, 2016 | —N/a |
| Warped Tour | — | July 6, 2017 | —N/a |
| Warrant | Blood, Sweat & Beers Tour | August 16, 1991 | FireHouse & Trixter |
| WEND 106.5 The End | End of Summer Weenie Roast | September 23, 1995 | —N/a |
| WEND 106.5 The End | End of Summer Weenie Roast | September 14, 1996 | —N/a |
| WEND 106.5 The End | End of Summer Weenie Roast | September 13, 1997 | —N/a |
| WEND 106.5 The End | Spring Carnival | May 2, 1998 | —N/a |
| WEND 106.5 The End | End of Summer Weenie Roast | September 5, 1998 | —N/a |
| WEND 106.5 The End | Koncert for Kosovo | May 28, 1999 | —N/a |
| WEND 106.5 The End | End of Summer Weenie Roast | September 19, 1999 | —N/a |
| WEND 106.5 The End | End of Summer Weenie Roast | September 16, 2000 | —N/a |
| WEND 106.5 The End | End of Summer Weenie Roast | September 15, 2001 | —N/a |
| WEND 106.5 The End | End of Summer Weenie Roast | September 22, 2002 | —N/a |
| WEND 106.5 The End | End of Summer Weenie Roast | October 5, 2003 | —N/a |
| WEND 106.5 The End | End of Summer Weenie Roast | September 11, 2005 | —N/a |
| WEND 106.5 The End | End of Summer Weenie Roast | September 16, 2012 | —N/a |
| WEND 106.5 The End | End of Summer Weenie Roast | September 28, 2013 | —N/a |
| WEND 106.5 The End | End of Summer Weenie Roast | September 6, 2014 | —N/a |
| Weezer | Indie Rock Road Trip | June 24, 2023 | Future Islands & Joyce Manor |
| Weezer & Panic! at the Disco | Weezer & Panic! at the Disco Summer Tour 2016 | June 20, 2016 | Andrew McMahon in the Wilderness |
| Whitney Houston | I'm Your Baby Tonight World Tour | July 6, 1991 | After 7 |
| The Who | 1996–1997 World Tour | August 12, 1997 | Drivin' N' Cryin' |
| Widespread Panic | 1995 Tour | September 24, 1995 | Joan Osborne & Freddy Jones Band |
| Widespread Panic | 1996 Tour | June 29, 1996 | Screamin' Cheetah Wheelies, Kenny Wayne Shepherd |
| Widespread Panic | Bombs & Butterflies Tour | July 11, 1997 | Gov't Mule & Gibb Droll |
| Widespread Panic | 1998 Tour | July 19, 1998 | Leftover Salmon; G. Love & Special Sauce; Guster |
| Widespread Panic | 2005 Tour | July 29, 2005 | —N/a |
| Widespread Panic | Earth to America Tour | September 29, 2006 | The Dynamites |
| Widespread Panic | Earth to America Tour | September 30, 2006 | The Dynamites |
| Widespread Panic | 2007 Tour | July 27, 2007 | North Mississippi Allstars |
| Widespread Panic | 2007 Tour | July 28, 2007 | North Mississippi Allstars |
| Widespread Panic | Free Somehow Tour | July 25, 2008 | DJ Logic |
| Widespread Panic | Free Somehow Tour | July 26, 2008 | DJ Logic |
| Widespread Panic | Dirty Side Down Tour | July 30, 2010 | Band of Horses |
| Widespread Panic | Dirty Side Down Tour | July 31, 2010 | Band of Horses |
| Wilco | 1998 Tour | August 14, 1998 | Lyle Lovett & Joan Baez |
| Willie Nelson | Outlaw Music Festival 2018 | June 20, 2018 | The Avett Brothers; Jamey Johnson; Sarah Shook & the Dislarmers |
| Willie Nelson | Outlaw Music Festival 2022 | September 10, 2022 | Nathaniel Rateliff & the Night Sweats; Billy Strings, Charley Crockett |
| Wiz Khalifa | Decent Exposure Tour | July 10, 2019 | French Montana, Playboi Carti, Moneybagg Yo, Chevy Woods & DJ Drama |
| Wiz Khalifa | Vinyl Verse Summer Tour | August 11, 2022 | Logic, 24kGoldn; Fred the Godson, Chevy Woods; DJ Bonics; C Dot Castro, DJ Drama |
| WRFX 99.7's Birthday Bash | 5th Annual Birthday Bash | July 13, 1991 | —N/a |
| Wu Tang Clan & Nas | New York State of Mind Tour | September 18, 2022 | DJ Scratch |
| Yes | Talk Tour | August 13, 1994 | —N/a |
| Yes | Masterworks Tour | July 28, 2000 | Kansas |
| Zac Brown Band | You Get What You Give Tour | August 21, 2010 | The Wood Brothers; Casey Driessen |
| Zac Brown Band | 2011 Tour | July 3, 2011 | Blackberry Smoke |
| Zac Brown Band | Uncaged Tour | October 25, 2012 | Blackberry Smoke; Levi Lowrey |
| Zac Brown Band | 2013 Tour | October 11, 2013 | The Wood Brothers & Dugas |
| Zac Brown Band | Great American Road Trip Tour | June 12, 2014 | —N/a |
| Zac Brown Band | Jekyll + Hyde Tour | June 4, 2015 | —N/a |
| Zac Brown Band | Black Out the Sun Tour | September 15, 2016 | Drake White & the Big Fire |
| Zac Brown Band | Welcome Home Tour | October 5, 2017 | Darrell Brown; Madison Ryann Ward |
| Zac Brown Band | Down the Rabbit Hole Live | April 14, 2019 | Moon Taxi |
| Zac Brown Band | The Comeback Tour | October 17, 2021 | Caroline Jones |
| ZZ Top | Beer Drinkers and Hell Raisers Tour | May 10, 2003 | Ted Nugent; Kenny Wayne Shepherd |

== See also ==
- List of contemporary amphitheatres
- Live Nation
