= Lee Thomas Miller =

American country songwriter

- Born: Nicholasville, Kentucky, USA
- Genres: Country
- Occupations: Songwriter, record producer
- Years active: mid 1990s–present

Lee Thomas Miller (born in Nicholasville, Kentucky) is an American country music songwriter and occasional record producer. His credits include 7 number one country hits: "The Impossible" (Joe Nichols), "The World", "I'm Still a Guy" and "Perfect Storm"—all by Brad Paisley—"You're Gonna Miss This" for Trace Adkins, "I Just Wanna Be Mad" by Terri Clark, and "Southern Girl" (Tim McGraw). Three of his songs—"You're Gonna Miss This", "The Impossible" and "In Color" by Jamey Johnson—were nominated for Best Country Song at the Grammy Awards. Miller also co-wrote "Whiskey and You" with Chris Stapleton, which appears on Stapleton's 2015 album Traveller.

== Biography and musical career ==
Miller left his hometown to attend Eastern Kentucky University and graduated in 1990. After graduation, he moved to Nashville, Tennessee, to find work as a songwriter. Ken Mellons was the first artist to record his material, in 1994, but it was not until Blackhawk released "Days of America" in 2002 that Miller had a writing credit for a chart single. Another recording from 2002, "The Impossible" by Joe Nichols, was nominated for a Grammy Award a year later. Both it and Terri Clark's 2003 single "I Just Wanna Be Mad" earned Miller BMI Million-Air awards in 2004 for receiving one million radio plays each. In addition to 3 Grammy nominations, Miller won CMA and ACM song of the year awards with "In Color".

Lee currently serves as the President of the board for the Nashville Songwriters Association International (NSAI), in which capacity he often advocates before Congress on behalf of composers.

In addition to his songwriting, Miller has also produced for Curb Records' artists Steve Holy and Amy Dalley.

== Singles composed by Lee Thomas Miller ==
- Trace Adkins – "You're Gonna Miss This"
- Blackhawk – "Days of America"
- Blue County – "That's Cool"
- Garth Brooks – "People Loving People"
- Terri Clark – "I Just Wanna Be Mad"
- Amy Dalley – "Men Don't Change", "Good Kind of Crazy"
- Jamey Johnson – "In Color"
- Tim McGraw – "Nothin' to Die For", "Southern Girl"
- Joe Nichols – "The Impossible"
- Brad Paisley – "The World", "I'm Still a Guy", "Perfect Storm", "Crushin' It", "The Medicine Will"
- Deric Ruttan – "That's How I Wanna Go Out"
- Tommy Shane Steiner – "What We're Gonna Do About It"
