= Country Nation =

Single by Brad Paisley

from the album Moonshine in the Trunk
- Released: September 14, 2015
- Genre: Country
- Length: 3:45 (album version)
- Label: Arista Nashville
- Songwriters: Brad Paisley; Chris DuBois; Kelley Lovelace
- Producers: Brad Paisley; Luke Wooten

Brad Paisley singles chronology
"Crushin' It" (2015)	"Country Nation" (2015)	"Without a Fight" (2016)

"Country Nation" is a song recorded by the American country music artist Brad Paisley. It was released on September 14, 2015, by Arista Nashville as the fourth and final single from his tenth studio album, Moonshine in the Trunk. He co-wrote the song with Chris DuBois and Kelley Lovelace, and co-produced it with Luke Wooten.

== Content ==
The song is an up-tempo country song about the different types of people who make up the United States. The song makes reference to work performed, college athletics, trucks, country music and NASCAR.

Paisley worked different college sports team nicknames into the song, including the Mountaineers, Volunteers, Crimson Tide, Seminoles, Longhorns, Wildcats, Wolverines, Tigers (the music video suggests this is referring to Auburn and LSU), Buckeyes, Bruins, Bulldogs, Hogs, Hurricanes, Blue Devils, Tar Heels, Rebels, Fighting Irish and Cavaliers.

He also made note of cheering for different numbers (presumably NASCAR), including 14 (Tony Stewart), 24 (Jeff Gordon), 48 (Jimmie Johnson) and 88 (Dale Earnhardt Jr.).

== Music video ==
The music video was premiered on The Today Show on September 3, 2015. Part of the video was shot in Nashville, Tennessee, and was directed by Jeff Venable. It shows the mascots from Georgia, Tennessee, Western Kentucky, West Virginia, Virginia Tech, Duke, Ohio State, Miami, Virginia, Kentucky, LSU, Oklahoma, Nebraska, Arizona State, Arkansas, Auburn, Alabama, Purdue, Oklahoma State, Baylor, Michigan State, Georgia Tech, Vanderbilt, Oregon, Austin Peay, and a Brad Paisley mascot.

=== Synopsis ===
The video celebrates the blue-collar spirit and America's love of sports. Cut into performance shots of Paisley at Vanderbilt University's football stadium, some of the mascots are shown working at jobs such as at a car wash, on a farm and pizza delivery. Towards the end of the video the mascots are all shown playing American football together.

== Commercial performance ==
The song was first released in August 2014 as a promotional single and charted at number 37 on the Hot Country Songs chart. It debuted at number 53 on the U.S. Billboard Country Airplay chart for the week of September 7, 2015, a week before its official release to radio.

== Chart performance ==
The song debuted on the Country Airplay chart at number 53 for the week ending September 19, 2015. It peaked at #12 on that chart for the week ending January 30, 2016, holding that position for three non-consecutive weeks.

=== Weekly charts ===
Chart (2015–2016)	Peak position
Canada Country (Billboard)	30
US Billboard Hot 100	94
US Country Airplay (Billboard)	12
US Hot Country Songs (Billboard)	18

=== Year-end charts ===
Chart (2015)	Position
US Hot Country Songs (Billboard)	99
Chart (2016)	Position
US Hot Country Songs (Billboard)	80
