= Perfect Storm (song) =

Single by Brad Paisley

from the album Moonshine in the Trunk
- Released: September 1, 2014
- Genre: Country
- Length: 3:55 (album version); 3:30 (single edit)
- Label: Arista Nashville
- Songwriters: Brad Paisley; Lee Thomas Miller
- Producers: Brad Paisley; Luke Wooten

Brad Paisley singles chronology
"River Bank" (2014)	"Perfect Storm" (2014)	"Crushin' It" (2015)

"Perfect Storm" is a song recorded by American country music artist Brad Paisley. It was released on September 1, 2014, by Arista Nashville as the second single from his tenth studio album, Moonshine in the Trunk. He co-wrote the song with Lee Thomas Miller and co-produced it with Luke Wooten.

== Content ==
The song is a love ballad musically driven mainly by electric guitar and also featuring a prominent steel guitar, fiddle and a synthesizer. Paisley said he wanted the guitar part to sound like thunder. Lyrically, the singer describes the girl he loves as a "perfect storm."

== Critical reception ==
Deborah Evans Price of Billboard said Perfect Storm is "one of those love songs that says what women want to hear and what men wish they could say" and added that "it's a tender ballad [...] and it's got the word "hit" written all over it".

Taste Of Country gave the single a favorable review, stating that "Paisley’s stellar guitar skills are on full display here, creating a storm of powerful riffs all their own" and the song is just "as complex and beautiful as the girl Paisley is singing about".

Giving the song four and a half stars out of five, Dan Devour of Music Trespass said "the song is about that perfect girl that you can meet and fall in love with suddenly." He also states that its lyrics "show that Brad must have been in love recently."

== Music video ==
The music video was directed by Jim Shea and premiered in October 2014. In it, Paisley and his band play the song in the pouring rain while wind throws photos of Paisley's female fans all around them.

== Chart performance ==
The song was first released on August 5, 2014 as a promotional single and charted at number 45 on the Hot Country Songs chart. After its release as an official single, the song debuted at number 52 on the Country Airplay chart, and re-entered the Hot Country Songs chart at number 42. On the Country Airplay chart dated January 17, 2015, it became Paisley's nineteenth number one single, and his first since "Remind Me" in September 2011. It would be his last number one until seven years later, when he topped the chart again as a featured artist on Jimmie Allen's "Freedom Was a Highway" in February 2022. "Perfect Storm" peaked at number four on the Hot Country Songs chart, Paisley's highest peaking single on that chart since the methodology of ranking the songs was changed in 2012. It brought his total of Top 10 hits to 32. The song was also Paisley's first single to hit number one on Billboard's Canada Country chart. It has sold 357,000 copies in the U.S. as of February 2015.

Chart (2014–2015)	Peak position
Canada Hot 100 (Billboard)	76
Canada Country (Billboard)	1
US Billboard Hot 100	52
US Country Airplay (Billboard)	1
US Hot Country Songs (Billboard)	4

=== Year-end charts ===
Chart (2014)	Position
US Country Airplay (Billboard)	76
US Hot Country Songs (Billboard)	76

Chart (2015)	Position
US Country Airplay (Billboard)	61
US Hot Country Songs (Billboard)	62
