= Crushin' It =

Single by Brad Paisley

from the album Moonshine in the Trunk
- Released: January 26, 2015
- Genre: Country
- Length: 3:40 (album version); 3:21 (single edit)
- Label: Arista Nashville
- Songwriter(s): Brad Paisley; Kelley Lovelace; Lee Thomas Miller
- Producer(s): Brad Paisley; Luke Wooten

Brad Paisley singles chronology
| "Perfect Storm" (2014) | "Crushin' It" (2015) | "Country Nation" (2015) |

"Crushin' It" is a song recorded by American country music artist Brad Paisley. It was released on January 26, 2015, by Arista Nashville as the third single from his tenth studio album, Moonshine in the Trunk. He co-wrote the song with Kelley Lovelace and Lee Thomas Miller, and co-produced it with Luke Wooten.

== Composition ==
The song is about having fun when things have not necessarily been going as intended, drinking a beer and then crushing the can, while also playing on the slang term "crushing it", indicating that one has done an exceptional job. Co-writer Lee Thomas Miller told Nash Country Weekly magazine that Paisley presented the idea in a writing session with him and Kelley Lovelace, and after thinking about the idea, Miller noticed the use of the slang term in everyday conversation with others. Lovelace added that Paisley asked the two, "What else can you do with [beer] cans?", at which point Lovelace added lines about crushing beer cans.

The song is an uptempo country pop song. It opens with the sound of a crushing beer can, followed by an acoustic guitar solo. The song is mainly driven by electric guitar and drums. A fiddle solo after the second chorus preludes to the main guitar solo. After the last chorus, the song extends into fiddle and steel guitar solos, brusquely interrupted by the sound of a crushing beer can.

== Critical reception ==
Deborah Evans Price of Billboard said of the song: "Paisley is here to get the party started and this high-energy number lets the listener know they're in for a good time."

Monta Vaden of All Access Music Group during the song's debut week said, "this track is classic Brad Paisley. Fun, up-tempo, and a perfect way to shake off the cold weather and make you crave a cold beverage. Brad's typical self-deprecating humor shines through...By now, this should be in Medium [rotation]."

Giving it 9 out of 10 stars in his review for Whiskey Riff, Wes Langeler says, "Paisley is the king of clever wordplay and his latest single...is up there among the best in Brad’s creative career."

Jen Swirsky of Country Music Chat reviewed the song favorably saying that "filled with humor and snark, [“Crushin’ It” is] an acoustic sounding party song that celebrates using the weekends to escape real life" and "an ode to checking your problems at the door and finding solitude in a good cold one".

== Commercial performance ==
The song was first released on August 12, 2014 as a promotional single and charted at number 46 on the Hot Country Songs chart. It debuted at number 54 on the U.S. Billboard Country Airplay chart for the week of February 7, 2015, its first week released to radio. It entered the Billboard Hot 100 at No. 98 for the chart of May 16, 2015. The song peak at Hot Country Songs chart at No. 15 for the chart dated July 25, 2015. The song has sold 232,000 copies in the U.S. as of August 2015.

The song debuted at number 48 on the Canada Country chart for the week of February 14, 2015. It also debuted at number 72 on the Canadian Hot 100 chart for the week of August 30, 2014.

== Music video ==
The music video for "Crushin' It" was released on May 12, 2015. Paisley created the entire video which features cartoon animations of numerous country singers as superheroes who fight "alien robot beer cans". The video includes Paisley himself, Blake Shelton, Luke Bryan, Kenny Chesney, Darius Rucker, Keith Urban, Carrie Underwood, the Zac Brown Band, Miranda Lambert, Dierks Bentley, Rascal Flatts, Eric Church, George Strait, Tim McGraw, Faith Hill, Jason Aldean, Florida Georgia Line, Little Big Town, Jimmy Kimmel, and Guillermo.

== Chart performance ==
| Chart (2015) | Peak position |
|---|---|
| Canada (Canadian Hot 100) | 71 |
| Canada Country (Billboard) | 6 |
| US Billboard Hot 100 | 66 |
| US Country Airplay (Billboard) | 9 |
| US Hot Country Songs (Billboard) | 15 |

=== Year-end charts ===
| Chart (2015) | Position |
|---|---|
| US Country Airplay (Billboard) | 39 |
| US Hot Country Songs (Billboard) | 49 |
