= River Bank (Brad Paisley song) =

Single by Brad Paisley

from the album Moonshine in the Trunk
- Released: April 14, 2014
- Genre: Country rock
- Length: 2:59 (original); 3:23 (remix)
- Label: Arista Nashville
- Songwriter(s): Brad Paisley; Kelley Lovelace
- Producer(s): Brad Paisley; Luke Wooten

Brad Paisley singles chronology
"The Mona Lisa" (2013)	"River Bank" (2014)	"Perfect Storm" (2014)

"River Bank" is a song recorded by American country music artist Brad Paisley. It is the lead single from his tenth studio album, Moonshine in the Trunk. He co-wrote the song with Kelley Lovelace and co-produced it with Luke Wooten. A remix of the song featuring country rapper Colt Ford was released in July 2014.

== Background ==
The song is about a man and woman who have fun on a river in the summertime. Paisley told The Tennessean that the song idea come from his own upbringing near the Ohio River: "My best memories with my grandfather are on that body of water, and my dad, and learning to ski. It's kind of like a back-to-basics song, which is really an inner tube and a boat and you've got a theme park."

Paisley debuted the song at the 2014 Academy of Country Music telecast on April 6. He also performed the song during the third episode of ABC's Rising Star.

== Critical reception ==
Deborah Evans Price of Billboard called River Bank "a slice of summer time fun" and added that "the production is edgy with a cool vibe". Giving it 2.5 stars out of 4, Michelangelo Matos of the New York Post said that "It's appealingly jaunty, but Paisley has done this better." Rolling Stone rated it 3 out of 5 stars: "This laid-back ode to inner tubes and bikinis, from an album due later this year, comes with a bendy Stones-steeped riff and a clever chorus that's like ad copy for low-budget fun.…If there must be bro-country, let it be this genial." Mikael Wood of The Los Angeles Times was less favorable, saying that "the tune is either a razor-sharp send-up of bro-country cliché — or a pathetic embodiment of the same from a songwriter capable of far, far more."

== Music video ==
The music video was directed by Scott Scovill and premiered in May 2014. It stars Twiggy the Water-Skiing Squirrel.

== Chart performance ==
The song debuted on Billboard's Hot Country Songs chart at No. 36 and Country Airplay chart at No. 29. It debuted on Bubbling Under Hot 100 at No. 14, and entered the Billboard Hot 100 at No. 88 four weeks later (chart date May 24, 2014). It peaked at No. 59 on the Hot 100, No. 12 on Hot Country Songs, and No. 2 on Country Airplay. As of September 2014, the song has sold 473,000 copies in the United States. It also peaked at No. 2 on the Canada Country chart. It was also the number-one country song of 2014, becoming the first song to do so without placing at number-one on the Canada Country chart at any point during the year.

Chart (2014)	Peak position
Canada (Canadian Hot 100)	37
Canada Country (Billboard)	2
US Billboard Hot 100	54
US Country Airplay (Billboard)	2
US Hot Country Songs (Billboard)	12

=== Year-end charts ===
Chart (2014)	Position
Canada Country (Billboard)	1
US Country Airplay (Billboard)	21
US Hot Country Songs (Billboard)	32

== Certifications ==
Region	Certification	Certified units/sales
United States (RIAA)	Gold	500,000^{‡}
^{‡} Sales+streaming figures based on certification alone.
