= Country Nation World Tour =

2014–15 concert tour by Brad Paisley

- Tour by Brad Paisley
- Associated album: Wheelhouse; Moonshine in the Trunk
- Start date: May 16, 2014
- End date: April 26, 2015
- Legs: 1
- No. of shows: 54

Brad Paisley concert chronology
- Beat This Summer Tour (2013–14); Country Nation Tour (2014–15); Crushin' It World Tour (2015–16)

The Country Nation World Tour was the ninth headlining concert tour by American country music singer Brad Paisley. The tour was in support of his ninth studio album, Wheelhouse (2013), and tenth studio album, Moonshine in the Trunk (2014). The tour began on May 16, 2014 in Camden, New Jersey, and finished on April 26, 2015 in Anchorage, Alaska.

== Background ==
Days before the tour started, Paisley still didn't have a name for the tour. "You should have seen our trucks — it's 10 white semis", "I'm tempted to take a sharpie and write, 'Brad Paisley World Tour on the front of it", Paisley told Billboard Magazine. Additional dates of the tour were announced in November 2014, and began on January 16, 2015, in Morgantown, West Virginia.

The tour was sponsored by Kraft's Cheese & Dairy Brands. To go along with the sponsor, fans were "able to participate in various Kraft-brand activities" like taking photos in the "Cheese Photobooth" and using props for an opportunity to appear during the show on screen.

== Opening acts ==
Leg #1

- Randy Houser
- Charlie Worsham
- Leah Turner
- Dee Jay Silver

Leg #2

- Swon Brothers
- Parmalee

== Set list ==
1. "Moonshine in the Trunk"
2. "Ticks"
3. "American Saturday Night"
4. "Southern Comfort Zone"
5. "Waitin' on a Woman"
6. "Celebrity"
7. "This Is Country Music"
8. "I'm Still a Guy"
9. "She's Everything"
10. "Beat This Summer"
11. "The Mona Lisa"
12. "Then"
13. "Online"
14. "Four-wheel Park"
15. "Mud on the Tires"
16. "River Bank"
17. "Hot for Teacher" (Van Halen cover)
18. "I'm Gonna Miss Her (The Fishin' Song)"
19. "Remind Me"
20. "Water"
21. "Old Alabama"
  Encore
22. "Alcohol"

== Tour dates ==
Date	City	Country	Venue	Attendance	Revenue
North America leg #1
May 16, 2014	Camden	United States	Susquehanna Bank Center	—	—
May 17, 2014	Burgettstown	United States	First Niagara Pavilion	—	—
May 24, 2014 ^{[A]}	Forest City	United States	Tree Town Festival	—	—
May 30, 2014	Maryland Heights	United States	Verizon Wireless Amphitheater	16,800 / 19,000 (88%)	$510,745
May 31, 2014	Tinley Park	United States	First Midwest Bank Amphitheatre	23,997 / 23,997 (100%)	$717,449
June 1, 2014	Bonner Springs	United States	Cricket Wireless Amphitheater	11,499 / 18,000 (64%)	$469,331
June 12, 2014	Columbia	United States	Merriweather Post Pavilion	—	—
June 13, 2014	Lawrence	United States	Clays Park Amphitheatre	—	—
June 14, 2014	Hunter Mountain	United States	Hunter Mountain	—	—
June 15, 2014	Bangor	United States	Darling's Waterfront Pavilion	7,997 / 9,000 (89%)	$339,515
June 19, 2014	Noblesville	United States	Klipsch Music Center	14,501 / 19,000 (76%)	$459,668
June 20, 2014	Cincinnati	United States	Riverbend Music Center	15,987 / 19,000 (84%)	$515,339
June 27, 2014	Milwaukee	United States	Marcus Amphitheatre	—	—
June 28, 2014	Cadott^{[B]}	United States	Chippewa Valley Country Festival	—	—
July 2, 2014	Toronto	Canada	Molson Canadian Amphitheatre	14,987 / 14,987 (100%)	$655,992
July 3, 2014	Darien Center	United States	Darien Lake PAC	14,665 / 19,000 (77%)	$496,455
July 5, 2014	Hartford	United States	Xfinity Theatre	—	—
July 10, 2014	Chula Vista	United States	Sleep Train Amphitheatre	15,662 / 19,000 (82%)	$521,592
July 11, 2014	Salinas	United States	Salinas Sports Complex	11,847 / 13,000 (91%)	$556,455
July 12, 2014	Irvine	United States	Verizon Wireless Amphitheatre	14,789 / 14,789 (100%)	$567,662
July 19, 2014	Peoria	United States	Ravina on the Lake	—	—
July 24, 2014 ^{[C]}	Cheyenne	United States	Cheyenne Frontier Days	—	—
July 26, 2014 ^{[D]}	Minot	United States	North Dakota State Fair	—	—
August 1, 2014 ^{E}	Sixes	United States	Cape Blanco Country Music Fest	—	—
August 2, 2014	Wheatland	United States	Sleep Train Amphitheatre	—	—
August 8, 2014 ^{[F]}	Detroit Lakes	United States	We Fest	—	—
August 14, 2014	Atlanta	United States	Aaron's Amphitheatre	15,225 / 19,000 (80%)	$503,227
August 15, 2014	Tampa	United States	MidFlorida Credit Union Amphitheatre	14,892 / 19,000 (78%)	$478,449
August 16, 2014	West Palm Beach	United States	Cruzan Amphitheatre	18,779 / 18,778 (109%)	$531,449
August 21, 2014 ^{[G]}	Syracuse	United States	New York State Fair	—	—
August 22, 2014	Holmdel	United States	PNC Bank Arts Center	16,645 / 16,645 (100%)	$690,225
August 23, 2014	Mansfield	United States	Xfinity Center	17,554 / 19,000 (92%)	$661,558
September 4, 2014	Austin	United States	Austin360 Amphitheatre	9,789 / 12,000 (81%)	$398,336
September 5, 2014	Dallas	United States	Gexa Energy Pavilion	18,245 / 19,000 (96%)	$545,338
September 6, 2014	The Woodlands	United States	Cynthia Woods Mitchell Pavilion	13,499 / 19,000 (71%)	$420,327
September 18, 2014	Virginia Beach	United States	Farm Bureau Live	16,973 / 19,000 (89%)	$529,449
September 19, 2014	Charlotte	United States	PNC Music Pavilion	16,994 / 19,000 (89%)	$499,599
September 20, 2014	Bristow	United States	Jiffy Lube Live	18,558 / 21,000 (88%)	$598,292
North America leg #2
January 16, 2015	Morgantown	United States	West Virginia University Coliseum	13,162 / 13,162 (100%)	$617,152
January 17, 2015	Morgantown	United States	West Virginia University Coliseum	13,162 / 13,162 (100%)	$617,152
January 22, 2015	Southaven	United States	Landers Center	—	—
January 23, 2015	Pensacola	United States	Pensacola Bay Center	—	—
January 29, 2015	Green Bay	United States	Resch Center	5,608 / 6,125 (91%)	$225,037
January 30, 2015	Cedar Rapids	United States	U.S. Cellular Center	4,199 / 5,000 (84%)	$225,013
January 31, 2015	Brookings	United States	Swiftel Center	4,641 / 4,641 (100%)	$251,596
February 5, 2015	DeKalb	United States	Convocation Center	4,929 / 4,929 (100%)	$248,285
February 6, 2015	Youngstown	United States	Covelli Centre	5,685 / 5,685 (100%)	$342,765
February 7, 2015	West Lafayette	United States	Elliott Hall of Music	4,403 / 5,000 (88%)	$245,800
February 19, 2015 ^{[H]}	San Antonio	United States	AT&T Center	—	—
March 5, 2015	Colorado Springs	United States	World Arena	4,763 / 4,763 (100%)	$290,700
March 6, 2015	Las Cruces	United States	Pan American Center	7,933 / 7,933 (100%)	$431,964
March 7, 2015	Lubbock	United States	United Spirit Arena	7,595 / 7,595 (100%)	$413,163
April 25, 2015	Anchorage	United States	Alaska Airlines Center	—	—
April 26, 2015	Anchorage	United States	Alaska Airlines Center	—	—
TOTAL				402,802 / 446,030 (90%)	$15,454,382

List of festivals and fairs

- ^{A} This concert was a part of the Tree Town Festival.
- ^{B} This concert was a part of Chippewa Valley Country Festival.
- ^{C} This concert was a part of Cheyenne Frontier Days.
- ^{D} This concert was a part of the North Dakota State Fair.
- ^{E} This concert was a part of the Cape Blanco Country Music Festival.
- ^{F} This concert was a part of the We Fest.
- ^{G} This concert was a part of the New York State Fair.
- ^{H} This concert was a part of the Stock Show and Rodeo.
- ^{I} This concert was a part of the Shakey Boots Festival.
- ^{J} These concerts were part of the Blue Ridge Music Festival.
- ^{K} This concert was a part of the Farmborough Festival.
- ^{L} This concert was a part of the Boots and Hearts Music Festival.
