= Beat This Summer Tour =

2013–14 concert tour by Brad Paisley

- Tour by Brad Paisley
- Promotional poster for the tour
- Associated album: Wheelhouse
- Start date: May 9, 2013
- End date: March 16, 2014
- Legs: 3
- No. of shows: 59 in North America; 2 in Europe; 61 in total

Brad Paisley concert chronology
- Virtual Reality World Tour (2012); Beat This Summer Tour (2013–14); Country Nation World Tour (2014–15)

The Beat This Summer Tour was the eighth headlining tour from American Country music singer Brad Paisley. The tour was in support of his ninth studio album, Wheelhouse (2013) and was presented by Cracker Barrel. Paisley's tour began on May 9, 2013, in Maryland Heights, Missouri, and ended on March 16, 2014, in London, England.

== Background ==
The tour was first announced on February 27, 2013. Paisley teamed up with Live Beyond and one dollar from every ticket sale went to the nonprofit organization. In November 2013 additional U.S. dates were announced for early 2014. This leg of the tour is called the Beat This Winter Tour.

== Opening acts ==
- Chris Young
- Danielle Bradbery
- Lee Brice (First leg only. All shows except for West Palm Beach, Tampa, Atlanta, Mission, and Brownsville)
- The Henningsens (First leg only)

== Setlist ==
This setlist is a representation of the Raleigh, NC show on June 8, 2013.

1. "Southern Comfort Zone"
2. "Mud on the Tires"
3. "The Mona Lisa"
4. "American Saturday Night"
5. "Outstanding in Our Field" (performed with Chris Young and Lee Brice)
6. "This Is Country Music"
7. "Celebrity"
8. "Then"
9. "She's Everything"
10. "Time Warp"
11. "Hot for Teacher" (Van Halen cover)
12. "Old Alabama" (performed with virtual Alabama)
13. "If You're Gonna Play in Texas (You Gotta Have a Fiddle in the Band)" (Alabama cover)
14. "Waitin' on a Woman"
15. "Online"
16. "I'm Still a Guy"
17. "Beat This Summer"
18. "I'm Gonna Miss Her (The Fishin' Song)"
19. "Karate" (performed with a virtual Charlie Daniels)
20. "Remind Me" (performed with a virtual Carrie Underwood)
21. "Welcome to the Future"
22. "Water"
  Encore
23. "Ticks"
24. "Alcohol"

== Tour dates ==
Date	City	Country	Venue
North America leg #1
May 9, 2013	Maryland Heights	United States	Verizon Wireless Amphitheater
May 10, 2013	Noblesville	United States	Klipsch Music Center
May 11, 2013	Tinley Park	United States	First Midwest Bank Amphitheatre
May 16, 2013	Holmdel	United States	PNC Bank Arts Center
May 17, 2013	Mansfield	United States	Comcast Center
May 18, 2013	Hartford	United States	Comcast Theatre
May 31, 2013	Toronto	Canada	Molson Canadian Amphitheatre
June 1, 2013	Burgettstown	United States	First Niagara Pavilion
June 2, 2013	Saratoga Springs	United States	Saratoga Performing Arts Center
June 6, 2013	Cincinnati	United States	Riverbend Music Center
June 7, 2013	Charlotte	United States	Verizon Wireless Amphitheatre
June 8, 2013	Raleigh	United States	Time Warner Cable Music Pavilion
June 21, 2013	West Palm Beach	United States	Cruzan Amphitheatre
June 22, 2013	Tampa	United States	MidFlorida Credit Union Amphitheatre
June 23, 2013	Atlanta	United States	Aaron's Amphitheatre
June 28, 2013	Virginia Beach	United States	Farm Bureau Live at Virginia Beach
June 29, 2013	Bristow	United States	Jiffy Lube Live
June 30, 2013^{[A]}	Camden	United States	Susquehanna Bank Center
July 12, 2013	Darien	United States	Darien Lake PAC
July 13, 2013	Fort Loramie	United States	Hickory Hills Lake
July 20, 2013^{[B]}	Twin Lakes	United States	Country Thunder
July 27, 2013	Dallas	United States	Gexa Energy Pavilion
July 28, 2013	The Woodlands	United States	Cynthia Woods Mitchell Pavilion
August 1, 2013	Greenwood Village	United States	Fiddler's Green Amphitheatre
August 2, 2013	West Valley City	United States	USANA Amphitheatre
August 4, 2013	George	United States	The Gorge
August 15, 2013	Penticton	Canada	South Okanagan Events Centre
August 16, 2013 ^{[C]}	Mission	Canada	Mission Raceway Park
August 17, 2013^{[D]}	Brownsville	United States	Willamette County Music Festival
August 22, 2013	Mountain View	United States	Shoreline Amphitheatre
August 23, 2013	Wheatland	United States	Sleep Train Amphitheatre
August 24, 2013	San Bernardino	United States	San Manuel Amphitheater
August 30, 2013	Stateline	United States	Harvey's Lake Tahoe Outdoor Arena
August 31, 2013	Las Vegas	United States	Mandalay Bay Events Center
September 20, 2013	St. John's	Canada	Mile One Centre
September 21, 2013	St. John's	Canada	Mile One Centre
October 17, 2013	Hamilton	Canada	Copps Coliseum
October 18, 2013	Ottawa	Canada	Scotiabank Place
October 19, 2013	London	Canada	Budweiser Gardens
October 23, 2013	Winnipeg	Canada	MTS Centre
October 24, 2013	Regina	Canada	Brandt Centre
October 25, 2013	Calgary	Canada	Scotiabank Saddledome
October 26, 2013	Edmonton	Canada	Rexall Place
November 14, 2013	Omaha	United States	CenturyLink Center Omaha
November 15, 2013	Rockford	United States	BMO Harris Bank Center
November 16, 2013	St. Paul	United States	Xcel Energy Center
North America leg #2 – Beat This Winter Tour
January 9, 2014	Greenville	United States	Bon Secours Wellness Arena
January 10, 2014	Pikeville	United States	Eastern Kentucky Expo Center
January 11, 2014	Louisville	United States	KFC Yum! Center
January 23, 2014	Estero	United States	Germain Arena
January 24, 2014	Tallahassee	United States	Donald L. Tucker Civic Center
January 25, 2014	Orlando	United States	Amway Center
February 13, 2014	Uniondale	United States	Nassau Veterans Memorial Coliseum
February 14, 2014	Uncasville	United States	Mohegan Sun Arena
February 15, 2014	Manchester	United States	Verizon Wireless Arena
February 22, 2014	Nashville	United States	Bridgestone Arena
February 27, 2014	Fort Wayne	United States	Allen County War Memorial Coliseum
February 28, 2014	Dayton	United States	Nutter Center
March 1, 2014	Charleston	United States	Charleston Civic Center
Europe
March 15, 2014	Dublin	Ireland	The O_{2}
March 16, 2014^{[E]}	London	England	The O_{2}

Festivals
^{A} This concert is a part of 92.5 WXTU FM's 29th Anniversary Show.
^{B} This concert is a part of Country Thunder.
^{C} This concert is a part of the Rockin' River Festival.
^{D} This concert is a part of the Willamette Country Music Festival.
^{E} This concert is a part of Country 2 Country.

== Box office score data ==
Venue	City	Tickets sold / available	Gross revenue
Gexa Energy Pavilion	Dallas	19,456 / 19,456 (100%)	$724,669
Cynthia Woods Mitchell Pavilion	The Woodlands	13,688 / 14,000 (98%)	$469,880
Fiddler's Green Amphitheatre	Greenwood Village	16,303 / 16,303 (100%)	$563,448
USANA Amphitheatre	West Valley City	14,987 / 19,000 (79%)	$547,448
Shoreline Amphitheatre	Mountain View	16,345 / 19,000 (86%)	$595,338
Sleep Train Amphitheatre	Wheatland	15,558 / 18,000 (86%)	$539,448
San Manuel Amphitheater	San Bernardino	19,978 / 19,978 (100%)	$702,338
Mohegan Sun Arena	Uncasville	7,266 / 7,266 (100%)	$575,594
Verizon Wireless Arena	Manchester	8,110 / 8,100 (100%)	$539,269
Nassau Veterans Memorial Coliseum	Uniondale	10,133 / 10,133 (100%)	$585,433
Bridgestone Arena	Nashville	13,598 / 13,598 (100%)	$573,815
TOTAL		155,422 / 164,844 (94%)	$6,398,680

== Personnel ==
- Gary Hooker: Rhythm guitar
- Randle Currie: Steel guitar
- Kendall Marcy: Keyboards, banjo, and mandolin
- Justin Williamson: Fiddle & mandolin
- Kenny Lewis: Bass guitar
- Ben Sesar: Drums
