= Same Here =

2023 song by Brad Paisley

Single by Brad Paisley feat. President Volodymyr Zelenskyy
- Released: February 24, 2023
- Genre: Country
- Length: 4:17
- Label: EMI Nashville
- Songwriters: Brad Paisley; Lee Thomas Miller; Taylor Goldsmith
- Producers: Brad Paisley; Luke Wooten

Brad Paisley singles chronology
"City of Music" (2021)	"Same Here" (2023)	"So Many Summers" (2023)

"Same Here" is a song co-written and recorded by American country music singer Brad Paisley. It is a single from his unreleased studio album Son of the Mountains. The song features a spoken interlude by Volodymyr Zelenskyy, the President of Ukraine.

== Content ==
Paisley wrote the song in 2023, drawing inspiration from the Russian invasion of Ukraine. He wrote the song with frequent collaborator Lee Thomas Miller and Dawes lead singer Taylor Goldsmith. Volodymyr Zelenskyy, who is the President of Ukraine, is featured in a spoken interlude. Paisley's royalties from the song were donated to United24. Jon Blistein of Rolling Stone wrote that the song "finds Paisley meditating on the similarities that link people around the world, despite ostensible cultural differences." The song is Paisley's first for EMI Records Nashville after his departure from Arista Nashville, and was slated to be included on a studio album titled Son of the Mountains.

Reviewers Kevin John Coyne, Jonathan Keefe, and Zackary Kephart of Country Universe all rated the song "B+", with all three reviewers praising Paisley's vocal delivery and the song's lyrics in particular.
