= I Can't Change the World =

Single by Brad Paisley

from the album Wheelhouse
- Released: August 19, 2013
- Genre: Country
- Length: 4:41 (album version) 4:16 (radio edit)
- Label: Arista Nashville
- Songwriter(s): Brad Paisley; Chris DuBois; Kelley Lovelace
- Producer(s): Brad Paisley; Marten Aston

Brad Paisley singles chronology
"Beat This Summer" (2013)	"I Can't Change the World" (2013)	"The Mona Lisa" (2013)

"I Can't Change the World" is a song co-written and recorded by American country music artist Brad Paisley. It was released in August 2013 as the third single from his ninth studio album, Wheelhouse. Paisley co-wrote the song with Chris DuBois and Kelley Lovelace. In August 2013, Paisley announced plans to film a movie based on the song.

== Background ==
According to Paisley, the song's message is that "as messed up as this world feels, changing one person’s life makes yours worthwhile". He goes on saying that one of his favorite lines of the song is "so let Jesus look down on this mess / and let the powers that be just fuss and fight". The song was one of the first that was cut for the album and it was an up-tempo: "it didn’t have much magic that way. It had power, but no magic”. Paisley added that the song "is very important. It’s a really timely love song". He adds that "it wouldn’t have worked 30 years ago as well as it will now. It’s written for the time we live in. Technology, instead of connecting us, it starts to separate us”.

== Critical reception ==
Billy Dukes of Taste of Country gave the song four stars out of five, writing that it is "a compelling piece of production because it’s both sparse and vulnerable, as well as textured and complicated." Michael Sudhalter of Roughstock gave the song three stars out of five, saying that Paisley "delivers it with some good acoustic guitar, strong vocals and a nice, slow melody […] even if it's not as profound as the title suggests."

== Chart performance ==
"I Can't Change the World" debuted at number 60 on the U.S. Billboard Country Airplay chart for the week of August 24, 2013. It also debuted at number 48 on the U.S. Billboard Hot Country Songs chart for the week of September 14, 2013. It also debuted at number 22 on the U.S. Billboard Bubbling Under Hot 100 Singles chart for the week of November 2, 2013. It peaked at number 22 on the Country Airplay chart, becoming Paisley's first single to miss the Top 20 on the country charts.

Chart (2013)	Peak position
Canada Country (Billboard)	43
US Bubbling Under Hot 100 Singles (Billboard)	22
US Country Airplay (Billboard)	22
US Hot Country Songs (Billboard)	33

=== Year-end charts ===
Chart (2013)	Position
US Country Airplay (Billboard)	88
