= Accidental Racist =

2013 song by Brad Paisley and LL Cool J

Song by Brad Paisley featuring LL Cool J

from the album Wheelhouse
- Released: April 9, 2013
- Genre: Country; country rap
- Length: 5:50
- Label: Arista Nashville
- Songwriters: Brad Paisley, LL Cool J, Lee Thomas Miller
- Producer: Brad Paisley

"Accidental Racist" is a song by American country artist Brad Paisley from his tenth studio album, Wheelhouse (2013). It features American hip-hop artist LL Cool J and was written by Paisley, LL Cool J, and Lee Thomas Miller.

== Background and composition ==
In the song, Paisley discusses wearing a shirt depicting the Confederate flag simply as a symbol of the Southern United States hoping that it is not misinterpreted.

The song generated controversy for its discussion of racism, particularly the song's message of showing "Southern pride," which includes the Confederate flag. Paisley stated that the films Lincoln and Django Unchained were inspirations and noted particular importance in the lyrics "We're still picking up the pieces, walking on eggshells, fighting over yesterday," and "Paying for the mistakes that a lot of folks made long before we came," stating, "We're all left holding the bag here, left with the burden of these generations. And I think the younger generations are really kind of looking for ways out of this." In his verse, LL Cool J raps "RIP Robert E. Lee, but I gotta thank Abraham Lincoln for freeing me."

== Reception ==
Jason Lipshutz of Billboard said the song "carries good intentions, but Paisley's latest track fails to become more than a flat-footed apology for hate-induced uneasiness." He critiqued LL Cool J's verses, saying, "His proclamations regarding the history of slavery and the solution to racial tension are downright bizarre," particularly the lyrics "If you don't judge my gold chains, I'll forget the iron chains", saying it was "probably the most downright offensive line ..., [suggesting] that, if LL Cool J's gold jewelry can be overlooked, so can all of slavery. Maybe 'forget' is the wrong verb to use in this line? Does anyone really want to 'forget' the horrors of slavery instead of learn from them?" David Graham of The Atlantic also took issue with the lyric "If you don't judge my do-rag, I won't judge your red flag," saying, "It's pretty insane to compare an inoffensive piece of headgear to a flag that represents a treasonous secession movement devoted to maintaining the practice of slavery. It's even more insane to compare jewelry to, you know, slave shackles," and, "This is exactly how not to write a song about the Confederate flag."

Brandon Soderberg of Spin criticized the production of the song, saying it was a "plastic-sounding Nashville facsimile fitted with rudimentary nods to hip-hop production—electronic drums tug along the almost six-minute song, while its studio effects-soaked sound vaguely nods to record scratching." Soderberg also reacted to the song's message, concluding that "it's hard to get really enraged at Brad Paisley and LL Cool J's country-hop attempt at racial solidarity because their clueless take on race-based message music seemingly meant well," but called it "the most politely toxic thing to drop onto the Internet this year."

=== Parodies ===
The song was parodied during the Weekend Update segment of a season 38 episode of Saturday Night Live where Paisley and LL Cool J were portrayed by Jason Sudeikis and Kenan Thompson respectively. In the sketch, the artists proclaim that the song "cured racism". On The Colbert Report, Stephen Colbert and Alan Cumming performed a parody of the track titled "Oopsie Daisy Homophobe".

== Chart performance ==
Chart (2013)	Peak position
US Billboard Hot 100	77
US Hot Country Songs (Billboard)	23
