= Time Well Wasted =

Studio album by Brad Paisley
- Released: August 16, 2005
- Studios: The Castle and Sound Kitchen (Franklin, Tennessee); Emerald Entertainment and Thelma's East (Nashville, Tennessee).
- Genre: Country
- Length: 65:30
- Label: Arista Nashville
- Producer: Frank Rogers

Brad Paisley chronology
Mud on the Tires (2003)	Time Well Wasted (2005)	Brad Paisley Christmas (2006)

Singles from Time Well Wasted
- 1. "Alcohol" Released: May 9, 2005; 2. "When I Get Where I'm Going" Released: October 10, 2005; 3. "The World" Released: March 13, 2006; 4. "She's Everything" Released: August 28, 2006

Professional ratings
Review scores
Source	Rating
About.com	5/5 stars
AllMusic	4.5/5 stars
BBC Music	(average)
Blender	3/5 stars
Entertainment Weekly	A−
Mojo	3/5 stars
People	3/4 stars
Plugged In (publication)	(unfavorable)
Rolling Stone	3.5/5 stars
Slant	4/5 stars
Stylus Magazine	B−
USA Today	3.5/4 stars
The Village Voice	(positive)

Time Well Wasted is the fourth studio album by American country music artist Brad Paisley. It was released on August 16, 2005, on Arista Nashville. It was the Country Music Association's Album of the Year for 2006.

The album produced the singles "Alcohol", "When I Get Where I'm Going", "The World", and "She's Everything". "Alcohol" was a number 4 hit on the Billboard Hot Country Songs charts, while the other three singles were all Number Ones. "Waitin' on a Woman" was re-recorded in mid-2008 as a bonus track for Paisley's 5th Gear album, and this re-recording was issued in June 2008 as a single.

== Content ==
The first single from Time Well Wasted was "Alcohol", which reached a peak of number 4 on the Billboard country charts in mid-2005. After it came "When I Get Where I'm Going", featuring background vocals from Dolly Parton. This song became Paisley's fifth Number One and Parton's twenty-fifth, as well as her first since the Ricky Van Shelton duet "Rockin' Years" in 1991. It also made her the oldest female artist to have a Number One hit on the country charts.

"The World", the third single, became Paisley's highest-debuting single when it entered the charts at number 37, and was his sixth Number One. Finishing off the single releases was "She's Everything", also a Number One. "Waitin' on a Woman", a cut from this album, was re-recorded and released to radio in 2008, and was added to his next studio album, 2007's 5th Gear. Upon its reaching Number One, the re-recording of "Waitin' on a Woman" became Paisley's eighth Number One in a row, setting a new record for the most consecutive country Number One hits since the inception of Nielsen SoundScan in 1990.

== Track listing ==
No.	Title	Writer(s)	Length
1.	"The World"	Brad Paisley; Kelley Lovelace; Lee Thomas Miller	4:01
2.	"Alcohol"	Paisley	4:52
3.	"Waitin' on a Woman"	Don Sampson; Wynn Varble	4:32
4.	"I'll Take You Back"	Paisley; Robert Arthur; Tim Owens	4:23
5.	"She's Everything"	Paisley; Wil Nance	4:26
6.	"You Need a Man Around Here"	Paisley; Lovelace	3:33
7.	"Out in the Parkin' Lot" (duet with Alan Jackson)	Guy Clark; Darrell Scott	4:43
8.	"Rainin' You"	Paisley; Owens	4:16
9.	"Flowers"	Paisley; Miller; Chris DuBois	3:50
10.	"Love Is Never-Ending"	John Goodwin; Bobby Terry	3:58
11.	"The Uncloudy Day"	Rev. J. Alwood	0:53
12.	"When I Get Where I'm Going" (duet with Dolly Parton)	Rivers Rutherford; George Teren	4:08
13.	"Easy Money"	Paisley	4:14
14.	"Time Warp" (instrumental)	Paisley; Frank Rogers	3:56
15.	"Time Well Wasted"	Lovelace; Ashley Gorley	3:56
16.	"Cornography" (comedy sketch featuring James Burton and the Kung Pao Buckaroos)	Paisley; Rogers; Peter Tilden	3:56
17.	"Out Take 1" (hidden track)		0:15
18.	"Out Take 2" (hidden track)		0:13
19.	"Out Take 3" (hidden track)		0:35
20.	"Out Take 4" (hidden track)		0:34
21.	"Shatner Says Goodbye" (hidden track featuring William Shatner)		0:27

== Personnel ==
As listed in liner notes.

- Brad Paisley – lead vocals (1–13, 15–16), electric guitar, acoustic guitar, baritone guitar, 12-string electric guitar, hi-string acoustic guitar, mandolin
- Jim "Moose" Brown – acoustic piano, keyboards, Hammond organ, backing vocals
- Bernie Herms – acoustic piano
- Gordon Mote – keyboards
- Gary Hooker – electric guitar, 12-string electric guitar, backing vocals
- James Burton – electric guitar (16)
- Kendal Marcy – banjo, backing vocals
- Randle Currie – steel guitar
- Jerry Douglas – dobro
- Mike Johnson – dobro, steel guitar
- Bryan Sutton – mandolin
- Kevin Grantt – bass guitar, tic tac bass, upright bass, backing vocals
- Kenny Lewis – bass guitar, backing vocals
- Bobby Terry – bass guitar
- Ben Sesar – drums
- Eric Darken – percussion, vibraphone
- Stuart Duncan – fiddle, mandolin
- Justin Williamson – fiddle
- Wes Hightower – backing vocals
- Scott Hamilton and "The 12 Steps" – gang vocals (2)
- Robert Arthur and Tim Owens – "cry babies" (4)
- Alan Jackson – lead and harmony vocals (7)
- Dolly Parton – harmony vocals (12)
- "The Kung Pao Buckaroos" (George Jones, Little Jimmy Dickens and Bill Anderson, with Dolly Parton as "Miss Kitty") – featured vocals (16)
- William Shatner – featured vocals (21)

== Production ==
- Frank Rogers – producer
- Chris DuBois – executive producer
- Richard Barrow – recording
- Brian David Willis – recording, digital editing
- Justin Niebank – mixing
- Brady Barnett – digital editing
- Adam Hatley – digital editing
- Hank Williams – mastering
- MasterMix (Nashville, Tennessee) – mastering location
- Katherine Stratton – art direction, design
- Brad Paisley – design
- Jim Shea – photography
- Fitzgerald Hartley – management

== Chart performance ==
=== Weekly charts ===
Chart (2005–07)	Peak position
Australian Albums (ARIA)	82
UK Country Albums (Official Charts)	4
US Billboard 200	2
US Top Country Albums (Billboard)	1

=== Year-end charts ===
Chart (2005)	Position
US Billboard 200	130
US Top Country Albums (Billboard)	20

Chart (2006)	Position
US Billboard 200	62
US Top Country Albums (Billboard)	17

Chart (2007)	Position
US Billboard 200	79
US Top Country Albums (Billboard)	17

== Certifications ==
Region	Certification	Certified units/sales
Canada (Music Canada)	Gold	50,000^{^}
United States (RIAA)	2× Platinum	2,000,000^{^}
^{^} Shipments figures based on certification alone.

== Album Cover ==
The clock hanging on the guitar seen on the album cover is an homage to The Persistence of Memory by Salvador Dalí.
