= The World (Brad Paisley song) =

Single by Brad Paisley

from the album Time Well Wasted
- Released: March 13, 2006
- Recorded: 2005
- Genre: Country
- Length: 4:01 (album version); 3:38 (radio edit)
- Label: Arista Nashville
- Songwriters: Kelley Lovelace; Lee Thomas Miller; Brad Paisley
- Producer: Frank Rogers

Brad Paisley singles chronology
"When I Get Where I'm Going" (2005)	"The World" (2006)	"She's Everything" (2006)

"The World" is a song co-written and recorded by American country music singer Brad Paisley. It was released on March 13, 2006, as the third single from Paisley's 2005 album Time Well Wasted. It reached the top of the Billboard Hot Country Songs chart and also peaked at number 45 on the U.S. Billboard Hot 100. Paisley wrote this song with Kelley Lovelace and Lee Thomas Miller.

== Content ==
The singer uses a play on words to declare his love, saying, "to the world, you may be just another girl / But to me, baby, you are the world."

== Critical reception ==
Kevin John Coyne, reviewing the song for Country Universe, gave it a negative rating. He calls the single a "treacly, condescending love song". He also adds that the song "sounds like something Archie would’ve sung to Edith."

== Music video ==
The music video was directed by Scott Scovill. It features a little girl whose older sister finds one of her CDs in the former's room and yells at her for it. The little girl then opens a little chest that reveals a Brad Paisley concert. She magically appears at the concert, and Brad Paisley gives her his hat. Then when the little girl is in her room again, her older sister comes in to apologize for being mean and permit her to listen to her CDs anytime. The little girl then shows her older sister what's in the magic chest. The concert shows earth balls rolling around on top of the audience, which has been done at some of Brad Paisley's concerts. The video peaked at #1 on CMT's Top 20 Countdown in 2006.

== Chart performance ==
Chart (2006)	Peak position
Canada Country (Radio & Records)	1
US Billboard Hot 100	45
US Hot Country Songs (Billboard)	1

=== Year-end charts ===
Chart (2006)	Position
US Country Songs (Billboard)	2
