= Brad Paisley =

American country musician (born 1972)

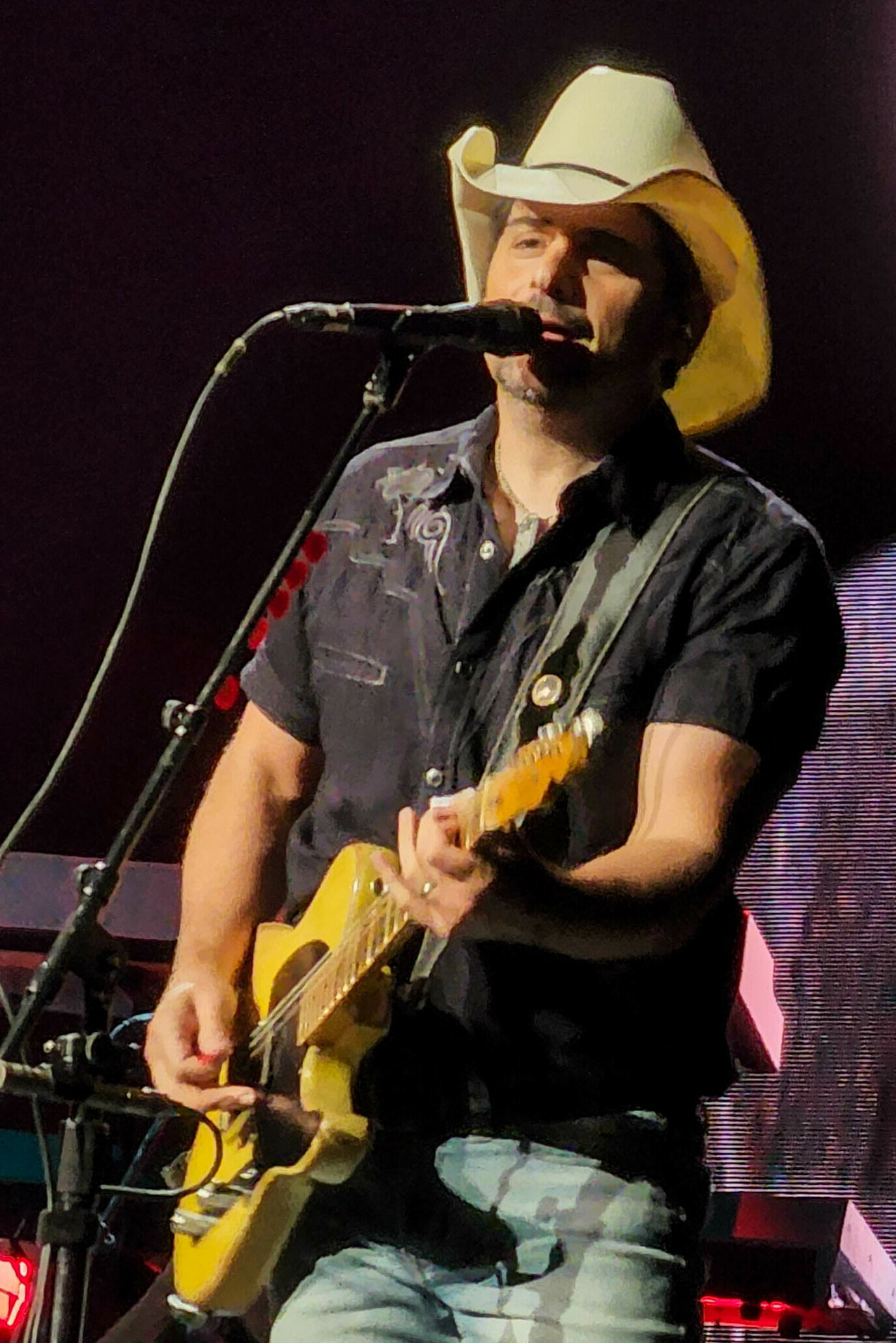
- Paisley in 2022
- Born: Brad Douglas Paisley; October 28, 1972 (age 54); Glen Dale, West Virginia, U.S.
- Education: Belmont University (BBA)
- Occupations: Singer; songwriter; guitarist
- Spouse: Kimberly Williams (m. 2003)
- Children: 2
- Musical career
- Genre: Country
- Instruments: Vocals; guitar
- Years active: 1998–present
- Labels: Arista Nashville; EMI Nashville
- Website: bradpaisley.com

Brad Douglas Paisley (born October 28, 1972) is an American country music singer, songwriter, and guitarist. His first success came in 1997 as the writer of David Kersh's "Another You". After this, he signed with Arista Nashville in 1998, and released his debut album Who Needs Pictures in 1999. This was the first of 12 studio albums he released for the label before its closure in 2023, after which he transferred to EMI Nashville. His most commercially successful albums are Mud on the Tires (2003) and Time Well Wasted (2005), both certified double platinum by the Recording Industry Association of America.

Paisley has charted more than 50 singles on the Billboard country singles charts, including 19 number-one singles ranging from "He Didn't Have to Be" in 1999 and "Perfect Storm" in 2015. Ten of these singles were achieved consecutively, starting with "When I Get Where I'm Going" in 2006 and ending with "Then" in 2009. Paisley has collaborated with artists such as Alison Krauss, Keith Urban, Dolly Parton, Carrie Underwood, and Alabama. Since 2003, he has been married to the actress Kimberly Williams-Paisley.

== Early life ==
Brad Douglas Paisley was born on October 28, 1972, in Glen Dale, West Virginia. He is the only child of Douglas Edward "Doug" Paisley, who worked for the West Virginia Department of Transportation, and Sandra Jean "Sandy" (née Jarvis) Paisley, a teacher.

He has stated that his love of country music stems from his maternal grandfather, Warren Jarvis, who gave him his first guitar, a Sears Danelectro Silvertone, and taught him how to play at eight years old. In third grade, he performed for the first time in public by singing in his church. Initially, they were just going to have him play the song on the guitar instead of a piano, but then the adults heard him sing the tune and said, "Forget the choir, let's just have Brad do the whole thing."

After that, he never had to ask for a gig until he left Glen Dale. He later recalled, "Pretty soon, I was performing at every Christmas party and Mother's Day event. The neat thing about a small town is that when you want to be an artist, by golly, they'll make you one." At age 13, he wrote his first song, "Born on Christmas Day", which later appeared on his album Brad Paisley Christmas. He had been taking lessons with local guitarist Clarence "Hank" Goddard. By 13, Goddard and Paisley formed a band called "Brad Paisley and the C-Notes", with the addition of two of Paisley's adult friends.

When he was in junior high, his school's principal heard him perform "Born On Christmas Day" and invited him to play at the local Rotary Club meeting. In attendance was Tom Miller, the program director of a radio station in Wheeling, West Virginia. Miller asked him if he would like to be a guest on Jamboree USA. After his first performance, he was asked to become a member of the show's weekly lineup. For the next eight years, he opened for country singers such as The Judds, Ricky Skaggs, and George Jones. He would become the youngest person inducted into the Jamboree USA Hall of Fame. He also performed at the Jamboree in the Hills.

Paisley graduated from John Marshall High School in Glen Dale, West Virginia, in 1991, and then studied for two years at West Liberty State College in West Liberty, West Virginia. He was awarded a fully paid ASCAP scholarship to Belmont University in Nashville, where he majored in music business and received a bachelor of business administration degree from the Mike Curb School of Music Business in 1995. He interned at ASCAP, Atlantic Records, and the Fitzgerald-Hartley management firm. While in college, he met Frank Rogers, a fellow student who went on to serve as his producer. Paisley also met Kelley Lovelace, who became his songwriting partner. He also met Chris DuBois in college, and he, too, would write songs for him.

Within a week after graduating from Belmont, Paisley signed a songwriting contract with EMI Music Publishing; and he wrote David Kersh's top-five hit, "Another You", as well as David Ball's 1999 single, "Watching My Baby Not Come Back". The latter song was also co-written by Ball.

== Career ==
=== 1999–2003: Who Needs Pictures and Part II ===
His debut as a singer was with the label Arista Nashville, with the song "Who Needs Pictures" (released February 1, 1999). In May of that same year, he made his first appearance on the Grand Ole Opry. Seven months later, he had his first number-one hit with "He Didn't Have to Be", which detailed the story of Paisley's frequent co-writer Kelley Lovelace and Lovelace's stepson, McCain Merren. The album also produced a top-20 hit with "Me Neither" and his second number-one hit, "We Danced", both in 2000. By February 2001, the album was certified platinum. Later in 2000, Paisley won the Country Music Association's (CMA) Horizon Award and the Academy of Country Music's best new male vocalist trophy. He received his first Grammy Award nomination a year later for Best New Artist. On February 17, 2001, Paisley was inducted into the Grand Ole Opry. He was 28 when he accepted the invitation. PBS did a 75th-anniversary concert special, in which Paisley and Chely Wright sang a song that they co-wrote called "Hard to Be a Husband, Hard to Be a Wife". This song later appeared on the compilation album Grand Ole Opry 75th Anniversary, Vol. 2. The concert would get a CMA nomination for Vocal Event of the Year.

Paisley later contributed to Wright's 2001 album Never Love You Enough, co-writing the tracks "One Night in Las Vegas", "Horoscope", and "Not as in Love". Paisley co-produced the former two tracks with her, in addition to playing guitar on them and featuring members of his road band, the Drama Kings; he also sang backing vocals on "One Night in Las Vegas" and "Not as in Love". In 2002, he won the CMA Music Video of the Year for "I'm Gonna Miss Her (The Fishin' Song)". Several celebrities made notable guest appearances in the video, including Little Jimmy Dickens, Kimberly Williams, Dan Patrick, and Jerry Springer. His three other singles from the Part II album, "I Wish You'd Stay", "Wrapped Around", and "Two People Fell in Love", all charted in the top 10. The album stayed in the charts for more than 70 weeks and was certified platinum in August 2002. To support his album, he toured the country as the opening act for Lonestar.

=== 2003–2007: Mud on the Tires, Time Well Wasted and 5th Gear ===
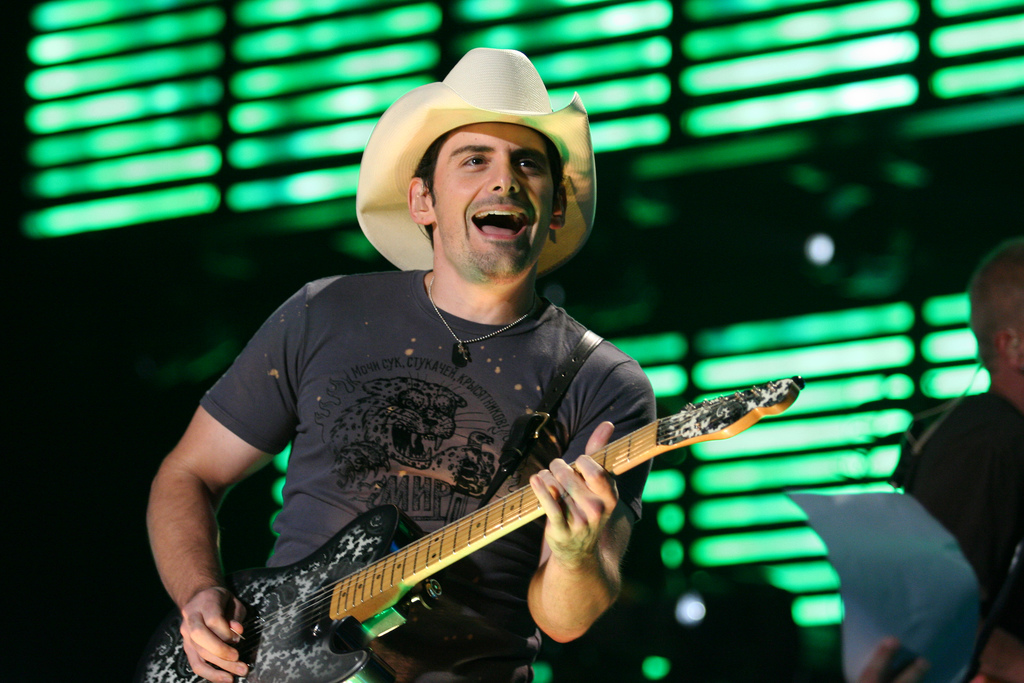
Paisley performing live in 2007

Paisley released his third album, Mud on the Tires (2003), following Who Needs Pictures and Part II. The album features the hit song "Celebrity", the video of which parodies television shows such as Fear Factor, American Idol, The Bachelorette, and According to Jim, and included such celebrities as Jason Alexander, James Belushi, Little Jimmy Dickens, Trista Rehn, and William Shatner. (Paisley later contributed to Shatner's album Has Been.) The album's title track, "Mud on the Tires", reached the Billboard number one in 2004. In addition, the ninth track from Mud on the Tires, "Whiskey Lullaby", a duet with Alison Krauss, reached number three on the Billboard Hot Country Singles and Tracks (now Hot Country Songs) charts, and number 41 on the Billboard Hot 100. The music video for "Whiskey Lullaby" also won several awards and was rated number two on the 100 Greatest Videos by CMT in 2008. The album was certified double platinum.

In 2005, after touring with Reba McEntire and Terri Clark on the Two Hats and a Redhead Tour, he released Time Well Wasted, which included the singles "Alcohol" reaching number four, "When I Get Where I'm Going" (a duet with Dolly Parton), "The World", and "She's Everything" with the last three all reaching number one. On November 6, 2006, Time Well Wasted won the CMA Award for Best Album. It also won album of the year at the 2006 ACM Awards. Paisley also contributed two original songs to the Disney Pixar's film Cars. These can be found on the film's soundtrack. This was in recognition of his contribution to the "Route 66: Main Street America" television special. At the 2006 Grammy Awards, Paisley received four nominations: Best Country Album (for Time Well Wasted), Best Country Song (for "Alcohol"), Best Country Instrumental (for "Time Warp"), and Best Country Vocal, Male (for "Alcohol").

Paisley's fifth studio album, 5th Gear, was released in the United States on June 19, 2007. The first four singles from the album, "Ticks", "Online", "Letter to Me", and "I'm Still a Guy", all reached number one on the country music single charts, making seven straight number-one hits for Paisley. "Online" featured the Brentwood High School marching band playing toward the end of the song, a cameo by Jason Alexander, and again featured a cameo by William Shatner. "Throttleneck:\" also reached number one, which gave Paisley his first Grammy. The fifth single from 5th Gear actually came from a reissued version of the album – a new recording of "Waitin' on a Woman", a track cut from Time Well Wasted. The reissued version received unsolicited airplay in late 2006, and features less prominent string guitar and violin parts and a more "muted" musical tone. For the chart week of September 20, 2008, the song became Paisley's 12th number-one single and his eighth straight number-one hit, making him the artist with the most consecutive number-one country hits since the inception of Nielsen SoundScan in 1990. Paisley toured April 26, 2007, through February 24, 2008, in support of 5th Gear on the Bonfires and Amplifiers Tour. The tour visited 94 cities over a 10-month period, and played for more than a million fans. The tour was so successful that it was extended past its original end date to February 2008. Some of the opening acts who appeared during the tour were Taylor Swift, Kellie Pickler, Jack Ingram, Rodney Atkins, and Chuck Wicks.

Paisley was nominated for three 2008 Grammy Awards related to 5th Gear: Best Country Album (for 5th Gear), Best Country Collaboration (for "Oh Love" with Carrie Underwood), and Best Country Instrumental (for "Throttleneck"). On February 10, 2008, he won his first Grammy award for Best Country Instrumental for "Throttleneck". In March 2008, Paisley announced his next tour, The Paisley Party, a 42-date tour sponsored by Hershey's. The tour kicked off on June 11, 2008, in Albuquerque, New Mexico, with Chuck Wicks, Julianne Hough, and Jewel as the opening acts.

=== 2008–2010: Play and American Saturday Night ===
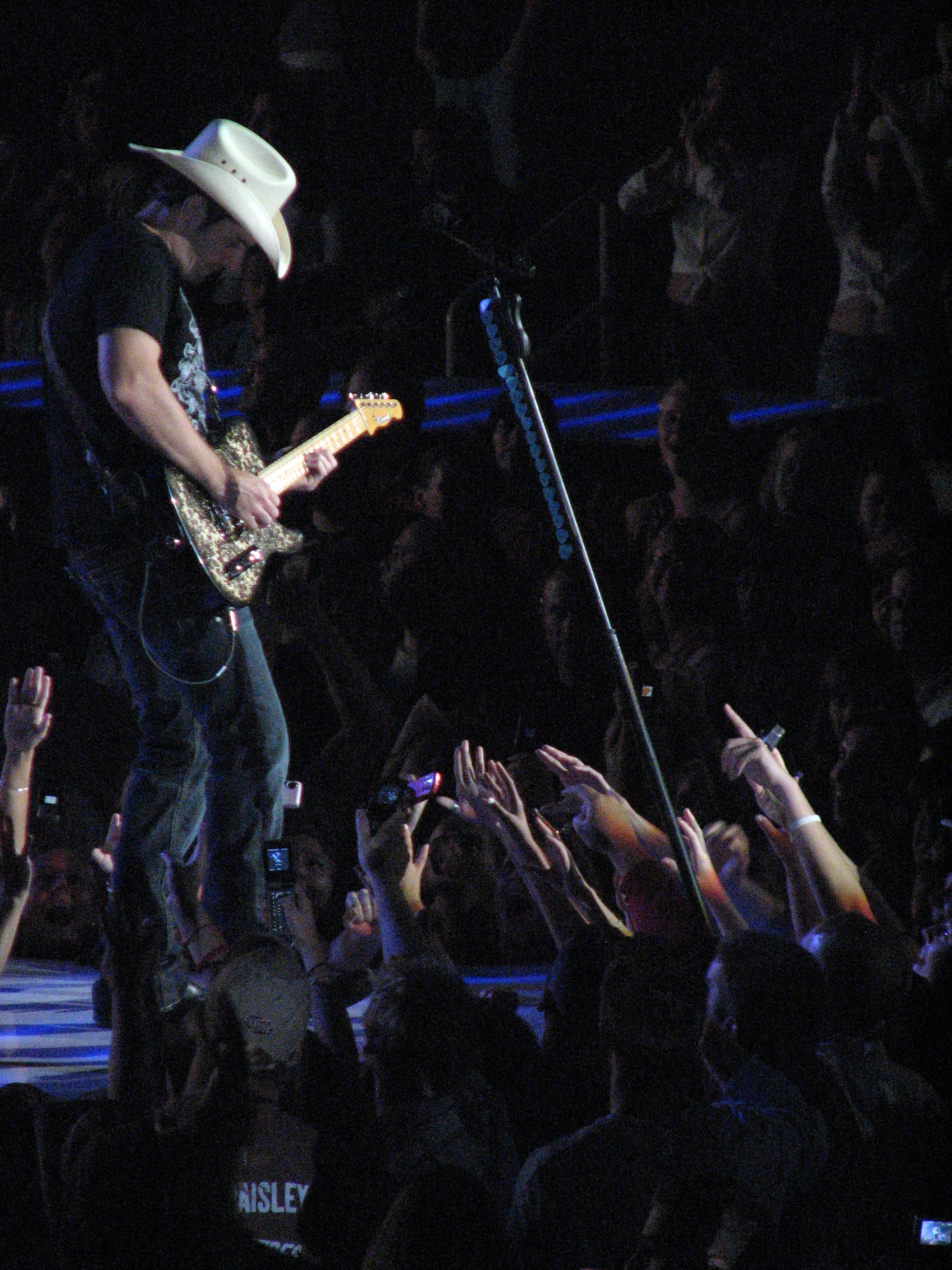
Paisley performing in 2008

A sixth instrumental album, titled Play, was released on November 4, 2008. Paisley and Keith Urban released to country radio their first duet together on September 8, 2008, "Start a Band". It was the first and only single from Play, and it went on to become Paisley's 13th number-one hit and his ninth in a row. The album also featured collaborations with James Burton, Little Jimmy Dickens, Vince Gill, John Jorgenson, B.B. King, Albert Lee, Brent Mason, Buck Owens, Redd Volkaert, and Steve Wariner. Paisley and Urban both received Entertainer of the Year nominations from the CMA on September 10, 2008. On November 12, 2008, Paisley won Male Vocalist of the Year and Music Video of the Year for "Waitin' on a Woman" during the CMAs.

Paisley announced on January 26, 2009, that he would be embarking on a new tour named American Saturday Night, with Dierks Bentley and Jimmy Wayne opening for most of the shows. Paisley's seventh studio album, American Saturday Night, was released on June 30, 2009. The album's lead single, "Then", was released in March 2009 and performed for the first time on American Idol on March 18. It went on to become Paisley's 14th number-one single and his 10th in a row. On July 21, 2009, Paisley performed at the White House for President Barack Obama and First Lady Michelle Obama in celebration of country music. Country Music at the White House was streamed live on the White House website, as well as a special on Great American Country. On November 11, 2009, Paisley co-hosted the CMA Awards for the second straight year. He also performed "Welcome to the Future", and won both Male Vocalist of the Year and Musical Event of the Year for "Start a Band" with Keith Urban.

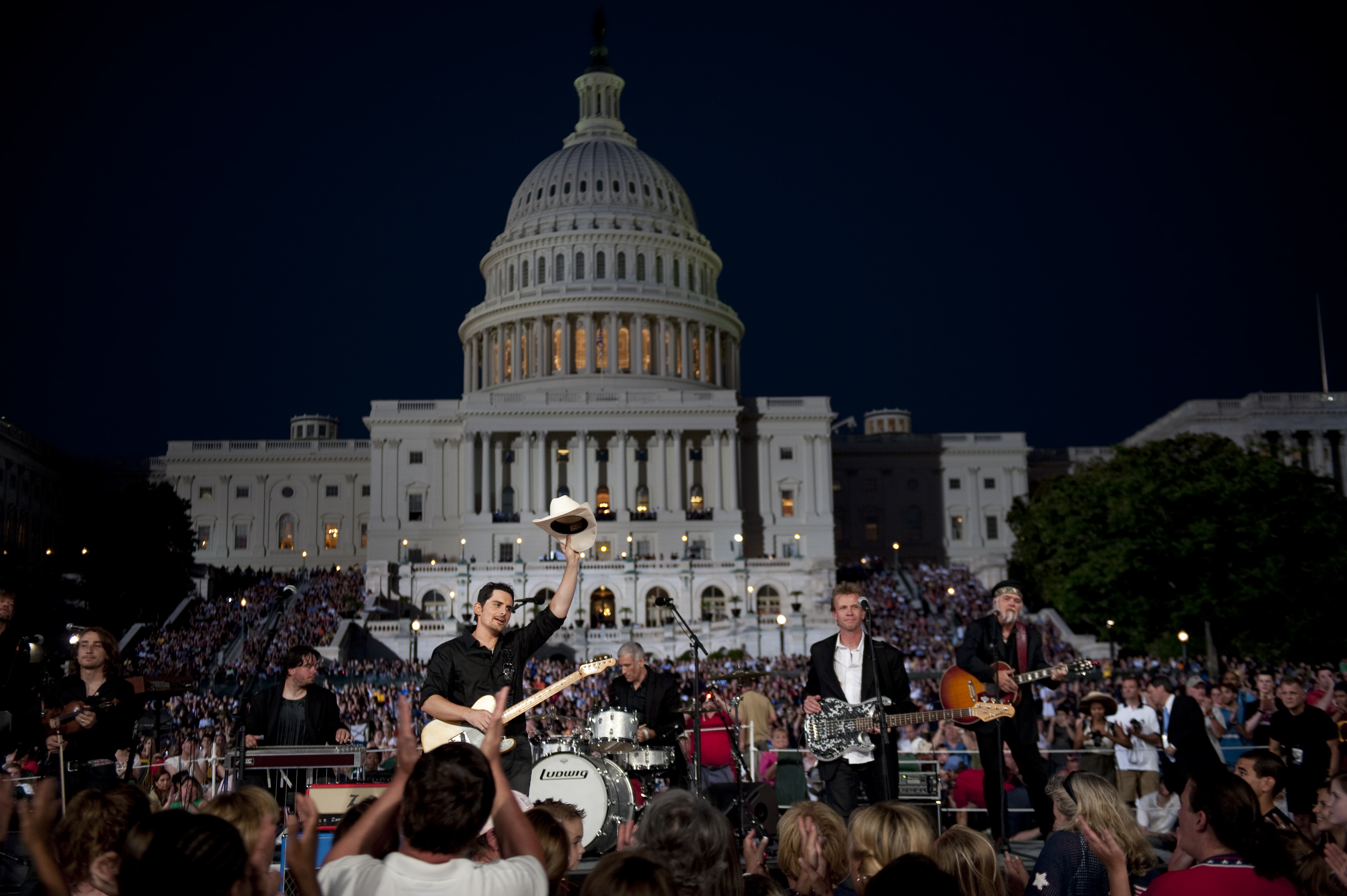
Paisley at the National Memorial Day Concert on the West Lawn of the United States Capitol in Washington, DC, May 30, 2010

On March 1, 2010, Paisley was the first musical performance with "American Saturday Night" for the second tenure of The Tonight Show with Jay Leno. On March 5, 2010, Paisley slipped and fell performing his last song of the set, "Alcohol", at a concert at the North Charleston Coliseum in Charleston, South Carolina, on the final date of the American Saturday Night Tour. Fearing a broken rib, he was held overnight at an area hospital, but was released when an MRI was negative. On July 31, 2010, Paisley performed alongside Carrie Underwood at the inaugural Greenbrier Classic PGA Tour Event in Lewisburg, West Virginia. An estimated 60,000 people attended the outdoor event to watch Underwood and Paisley perform in the pouring rain.

On August 4, 2010, his official website announced that Paisley would release his first official greatest-hits package, entitled Hits Alive. Released on November 2, 2010, Hits Alive is a double-disc collection, with one disc containing studio versions of Paisley's hit singles, while the companion disc features previously unreleased live versions of his songs. Paisley cohosted the 44th Annual CMA Awards on November 10, 2010, where he was also awarded the CMA's top award, Entertainer of the Year. During his acceptance speech, Paisley emotionally honored his grandfather, who inspired him to play the guitar. In 2012, MSN.com listed American Saturday Night as one of the 21 Essential 21st-Century Albums.

=== 2011–2014: This Is Country Music and Wheelhouse ===
In December 2010, Paisley released "This Is Country Music" as the title track to his eighth studio album, released May 23, 2011. The album's second single, "Old Alabama" (with Alabama), released to country radio on March 14, 2011, and became Paisley's 19th number-one hit. "Remind Me", with Carrie Underwood, was released May 23, 2011, to radio. On March 22, 2011, Paisley's website announced a new beta game titled Brad Paisley World. The game is modeled after other Facebook games such as Farmville or Mafia Wars, and features original animation. The game provides a new way for fans to interact with each other and view exclusive material that would otherwise be unavailable. On May 12, 2011, Paisley's website announced that he would release two songs on the soundtrack for the film Cars 2. One of them would be a collaboration with British pop singer Robbie Williams.

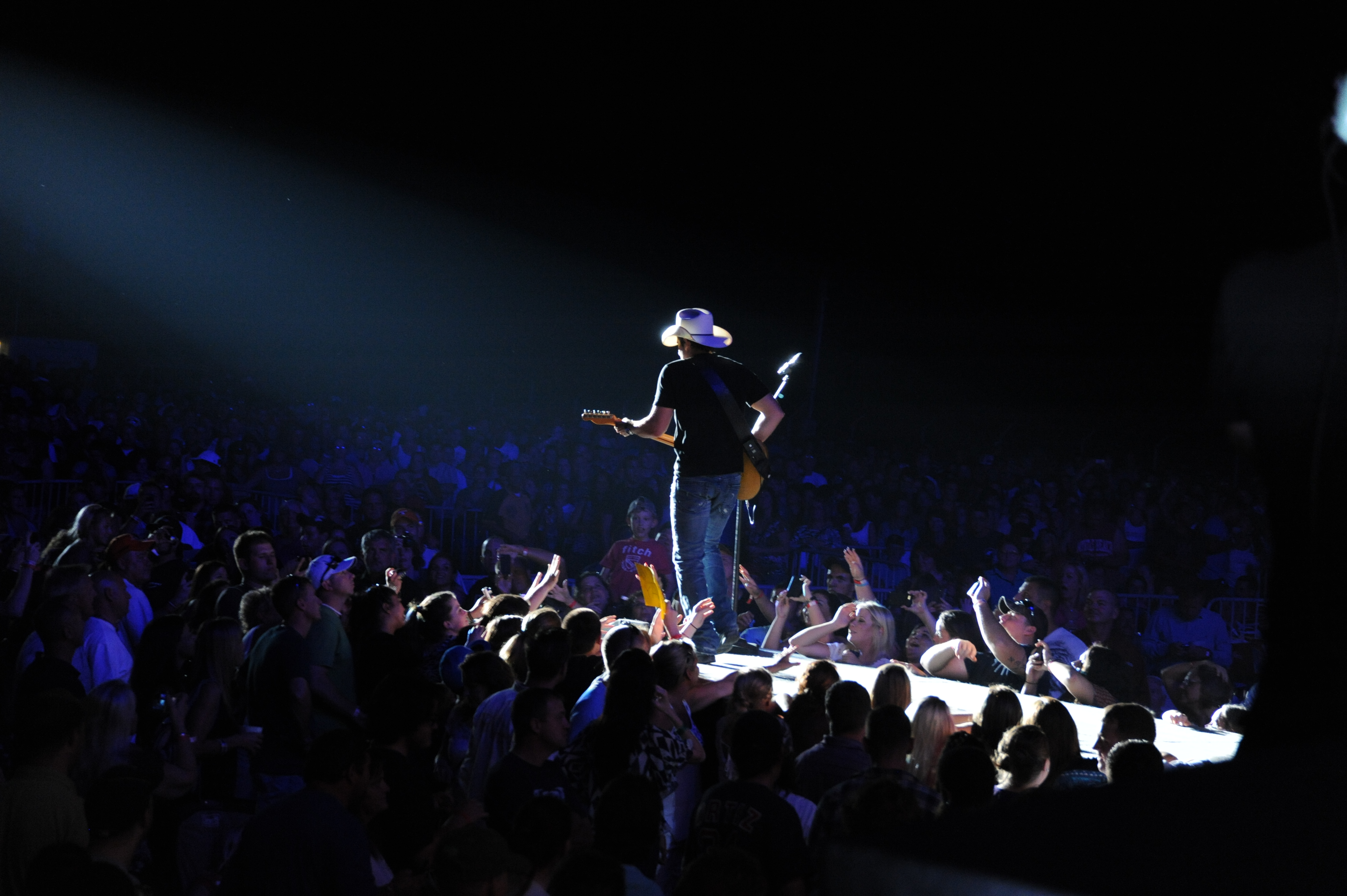
Paisley performing live in 2011

On September 21, 2011, Mailboat Records released Mark Twain: Words & Music, a double-CD telling Mark Twain's life in spoken word and song, including a new song by Paisley titled "Huck Finn Blues". Paisley's website announced that he was a fan of Twain, prompting his collaboration on the project with Clint Eastwood, Jimmy Buffett, Sheryl Crow, Vince Gill, and others. On October 19, 2011, Paisley made a voice cameo as various background characters in the South Park episode "Bass to Mouth".

On January 14, 2012, Paisley was a guest on Garrison Keillor's Prairie Home Companion, during which he did a rendition of "Life's Railway to Heaven" by Charles Davis Tillman. On April 25, 2012, Paisley was featured on the South Park episode "Cartman Finds Love", in which he voiced himself, sang the national anthem and helped Cartman sing the 1990s hit song "I Swear", which was popularized in 1994 by the country musician John Michael Montgomery and the pop group All-4-One. Paisley extended his Virtual Reality World Tour through mid-2012. He toured the country and made pit stops at local country music festivals.

On September 20, 2012, Paisley released a new single, "Southern Comfort Zone". The song debuted at number 25 on the Hot Country Songs chart, becoming Paisley's highest debut to date. It reached number two on the Country Airplay chart in 2013. The song was the first single from his ninth studio album, Wheelhouse, released on April 9, 2013. The album's second single, "Beat This Summer", was released to country radio on March 4, 2013. It also reached number two on the Country Airplay chart in July 2013. The album's third single, "I Can't Change the World", was released to country radio on August 19, 2013; despite a moderately good debut, the single failed to reach the top 20 on country charts, peaking at number 22 on Country Airplay, and becoming Paisley's lowest-charting single to date. The album's fourth single, "The Mona Lisa", was released to country radio on December 9, 2013. It peaked at number 19 on Country Airplay.

On June 12, 2013, Paisley announced on his Twitter page that he would join the Rolling Stones onstage during the band's concert in Philadelphia. His track "Accidental Racist", a duet with rapper LL Cool J, generated notoriety when it was released. Paisley sings about how he finds himself "caught between Southern pride and Southern blame"; Paisley explained that he is proud of where he is from, but he feels ashamed of the South's history of slavery and racism. The song generated controversy for its discussion of racism, particularly the song's message of showing "Southern pride", which includes reappropriation of the Confederate flag.

=== 2014–2017: Moonshine in the Trunk and Love and War ===
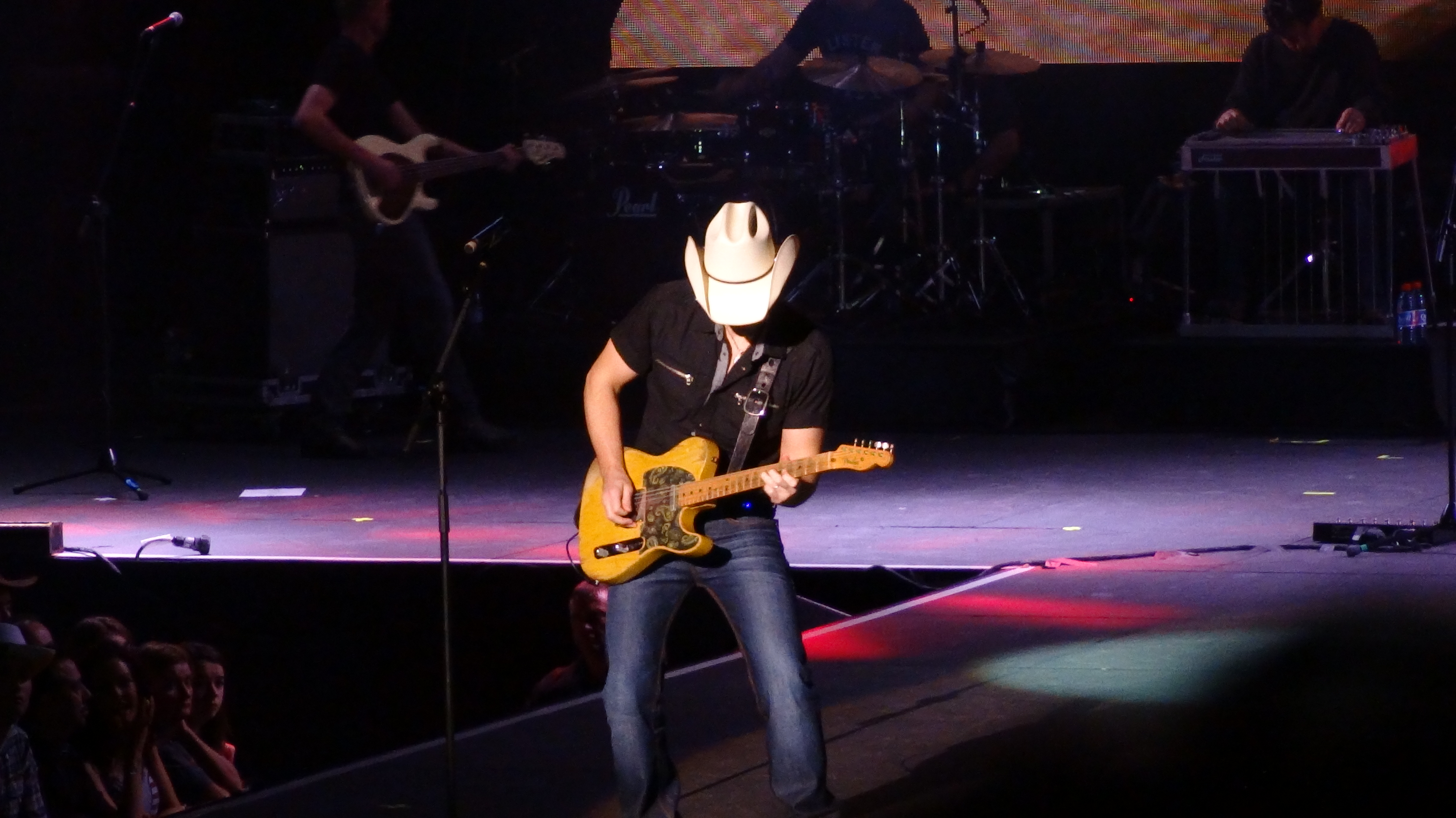
Paisley at the Country 2 Country Festival, Dublin, Ireland, March 15, 2014

On April 6, 2014, Paisley released "River Bank". It is the lead single from his 10th studio album for Sony Music Entertainment, Moonshine in the Trunk, which was released on August 26, 2014. Paisley co-wrote the song with Kelley Lovelace and co-produced it with Luke Wooten. The album's second single, "Perfect Storm", was released to country radio on September 2, 2014. It reached number one on the Country Airplay chart in January 2015. The album's third single, "Crushin' It", was released to country radio on January 26, 2015. The album's fourth single, "Country Nation", was released to country radio on September 14, 2015. On May 24, 2014, Paisley traveled on Air Force One with President Barack Obama to visit US troops at Bagram Air Base in Bagram, Afghanistan. Paisley played a full concert for the troops stationed there. On June 1, 2014, Rolling Stone ranked "Welcome to the Future" as number 100 in their list of the 100 greatest country songs. In September 2014, Moonshine in the Trunk became Paisley's eighth number-one album on Billboard's Top Country Albums chart. It also became his ninth Top 10 Pop album and fifth album to reach number two on the Billboard 200.

Paisley released "Without a Fight", a duet with Demi Lovato, on May 13, 2016. It was to have served as the lead single to his 11th studio album, but due to poor chart performance, it did not make the album's final cut. He was selected as one of 30 artists to perform on "Forever Country", a mash-up track of "Take Me Home, Country Roads", "On the Road Again", and "I Will Always Love You", which celebrates 50 years of the CMA Awards. The second single "Today" was released on October 6, 2016, which gave Paisley his first Country Digital Song Sales number one, opening at the top of the chart with 41,000 first-week downloads. The single landed in the number-one spot on the Country Aircheck/Mediabase charts, marking Paisley's 24th number-one song. On November 11, Paisley announced on Twitter that the title of the album would be Love and War, which was released in April 2017. Love and War features several collaborations with iconic artists, including Timbaland, John Fogerty, Bill Anderson, and Mick Jagger, as well as a songwriting credit with Johnny Cash.

=== 2018–present ===
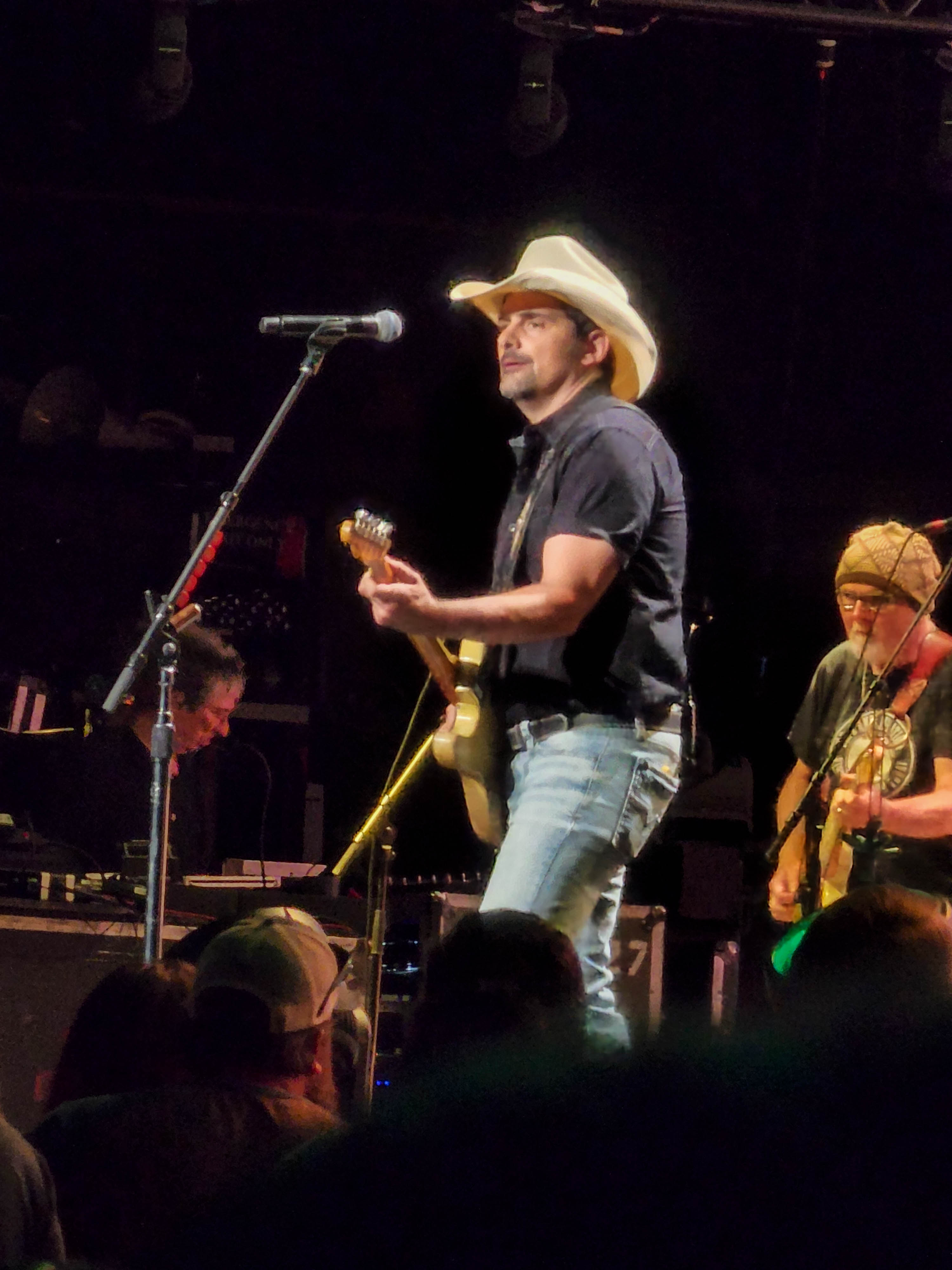
Paisley performing in Windsor, Ontario, May 29, 2022

On October 4, 2018, Paisley and his wife Kimberly Williams-Paisley partnered with Belmont University and opened a free referral-based grocery store in Nashville to help the community in need. The board of trustees for the store include Brad Paisley, president; Megan Zarling, chair; Pete Fisher, vice chair; Doug Paisley, secretary; and Elaine Bryan, treasurer. In November 2018, Paisley released "Bucked Off". On March 11, 2019, Paisley released "My Miracle".

In 2019, Paisley was a guest judge on season 14 of America's Got Talent. During the "Judge Cuts", he pressed the Golden Buzzer for singer/guitarist Sophie Pecora. In 2021, Paisley was featured on Jimmie Allen's "Freedom Was a Highway", which reached number one on the Billboard Country Airplay chart in February 2022, becoming Paisley's 20th number-one single, and his first since "Perfect Storm" in January 2015. This distinction also tied Paisley with Brooks & Dunn and Toby Keith for the 10th-most number-one singles since the chart's inception in January 1990.

In February 2023, Paisley announced that he signed a new record deal with EMI Nashville, leaving Arista Nashville, the label he had been with since the start of his career, and confirmed that a new album would be released later in 2023. The lead single was "Same Here", featuring Ukrainian president Volodymyr Zelenskyy, and was released a few days later on February 24. The album's second single, "So Many Summers", was released on June 23, 2023.

An extended play containing the first four tracks of the album was released on September 29, 2023. "The Medicine Will" and "Son of the Mountains" were released alongside the EP, with Paisley stating that these two tracks act as reflections of each other and were linked into the album's larger themes of exploring history and current challenges facing the region of West Virginia that he is from. Paisley noted, "I'm really glad they both are coming out, because I think if you only put out "The Medicine" right now, that'd be the whole story. But I definitely think the two of them together help set the picture for the rest of this album".

Paisley stated in September 2024 that he was postponing the Son of the Mountains album and was instead working on a different album; according to Billboard, the new album was expected to be released in early 2025. "Truck Still Works" was released as the first single for the new, currently untitled album, and it was described by Paisley and Billboard as a "sequel" to Paisley's hit "Mud on the Tires". In October, he performed Merle Haggard's hit "Workin' Man Blues" at the annual induction ceremony for the Country Music Hall of Fame to celebrate his friend James Burton's induction; Burton had played on Haggard's original recording.

In March 2025, Paisley collaborated with rock band Dawes to release the single "Raining Inside", a song exploring mental health co-written by Paisley, Dawes' Taylor Goldsmith, and Lee Thomas Miller. On November 7, 2025, Paisley released his second holiday album, Snow Globe Town, through Mercury Nashville. The 16-track project featured eight original Christmas songs, including "Counting Down the Days", which served as the official anthem for the Hallmark Channel's annual Countdown to Christmas event.

In May 2026, Paisley began a multi-month rollout for a new digital release referred to as Tacklebox, beginning with the lead single "Fallin'". A full 13-track project, Tacklebox (Disc 1) was released on July 17, through MCA Nashville. The album paired newly composed material with previously unreleased songs dating back to the late 1990s. The release featured collaborations with artists such as David Lee Murphy and Miranda Lambert, along with co-writing credits from long time collaborators Chris DuBois and Frank Rogers. To support the release, Paisley announced the "Brad Paisley Live" tour, kicking off in Davenport in August.

== Books ==
- Jug Fishing for Greazy and Other Brad Paisley Fishing Stories was released by Paisley in 2003 under Thomas Nelson Publishing. He co-wrote the book with author M. B. Roberts.
- Paisley released his book Diary of a Player: How My Musical Heroes Made a Guitar Man Out of Me in 2011 under Howard Books Publishing. He co-wrote the book with author David Wild, a contributing editor for Rolling Stone and an Emmy-nominated TV writer and producer. The book is an autobiography and talks about Paisley's introduction to the music industry and how the events in his life helped to prepare him for what was up ahead. The book features topics such as the first guitar that his grandfather gave him, his first band "Brad Paisley and the C-notes", the first song he wrote, and many more music and guitar related topics. Although the book does speak briefly of his personal life, the main focus is on his music and the start of his career.

== Discography ==
=== Studio albums ===
- Who Needs Pictures (1999)
- Part II (2001)
- Mud on the Tires (2003)
- Time Well Wasted (2005)
- Brad Paisley Christmas (2006)
- 5th Gear (2007)
- Play: The Guitar Album (2008)
- American Saturday Night (2009)
- This Is Country Music (2011)
- Wheelhouse (2013)
- Moonshine in the Trunk (2014)
- Love and War (2017)
- Snow Globe Town (2025)
- Tacklebox (Disc 1) (2026)

== Tours ==
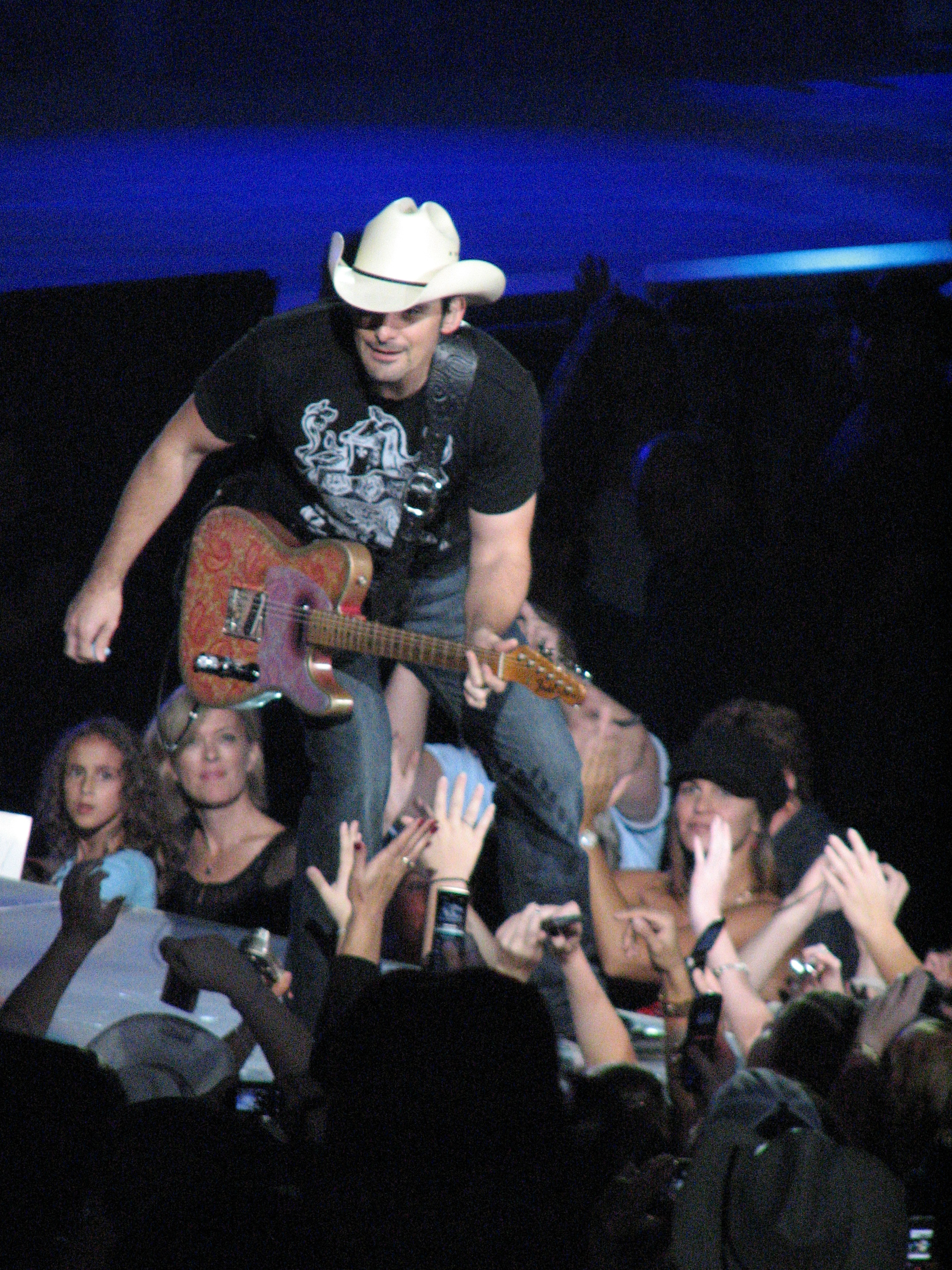
Paisley performing live in Providence, Rhode Island, September 27, 2008

=== Headlining ===
- Time Well Wasted Tour (2005–06)
- Bonfires & Amplifiers Tour (2007–08)
- The Paisley Party Tour (2008–09)
- American Saturday Night Tour (2009–10)
- The H2O Tour / H2O Frozen Oven Tour (2010–11)
- H2O II: Wetter and Wilder World Tour (2011)
- Virtual Reality World Tour (2012)
- Beat This Summer Tour (2013)
  - Beat This Winter Tour (2014)
- Country Nation World Tour (2014–15)
- Crushin' It World Tour (2015–16)
- Life Amplified World Tour (2016–17)
- Weekend Warrior World Tour (2017–18)
- Brad Paisley World Tour (2019)
- Tour 2021 (2021)
- World Tour 2022 (2022)
- Son of the Mountains World Tour (2024)
- Truck Still Works Tour (2025)

=== Co-headlining ===
- Mud and Suds Tour (2005) (with Sara Evans & Andy Griggs)
- Two Hats and a Redhead Tour (2005) (with Reba McEntire and Terri Clark)

=== Opening ===
- Brooks and Dunn's Neon Circus & Wild West Show (2003)

== Band ==
Paisley records his studio albums, in most part, with the backing of his live band, the Drama Kings. Their first gig together was May 7, 1999.

=== Current members ===
- Brad Paisley – lead vocals, lead guitar
- Gary Hooker – rhythm guitar
- Randle Currie – steel guitar
- Kendal Marcy – keyboards, banjo, mandolin
- Justin Williamson – fiddle, mandolin
- Kenny Lewis – bass guitar, vocals
- Ben Sesar – drums
- Kevin Freeman – live audio

=== Former members ===
- Jimmy Heffernan – steel guitar
- Ken Lush – keyboards
- Earl Clark – steel guitar
- Mike Johnson – steel guitar
- Jody Harris – guitar, mandolin, banjo

== Personal life ==
=== Relationships ===
In the last months of 2000, Paisley had a relationship with fellow country music singer Chely Wright. Unbeknownst to Paisley, Wright and her girlfriend had moved together into a new home earlier in the year. In her autobiography, Wright expressed regret for how she treated him.

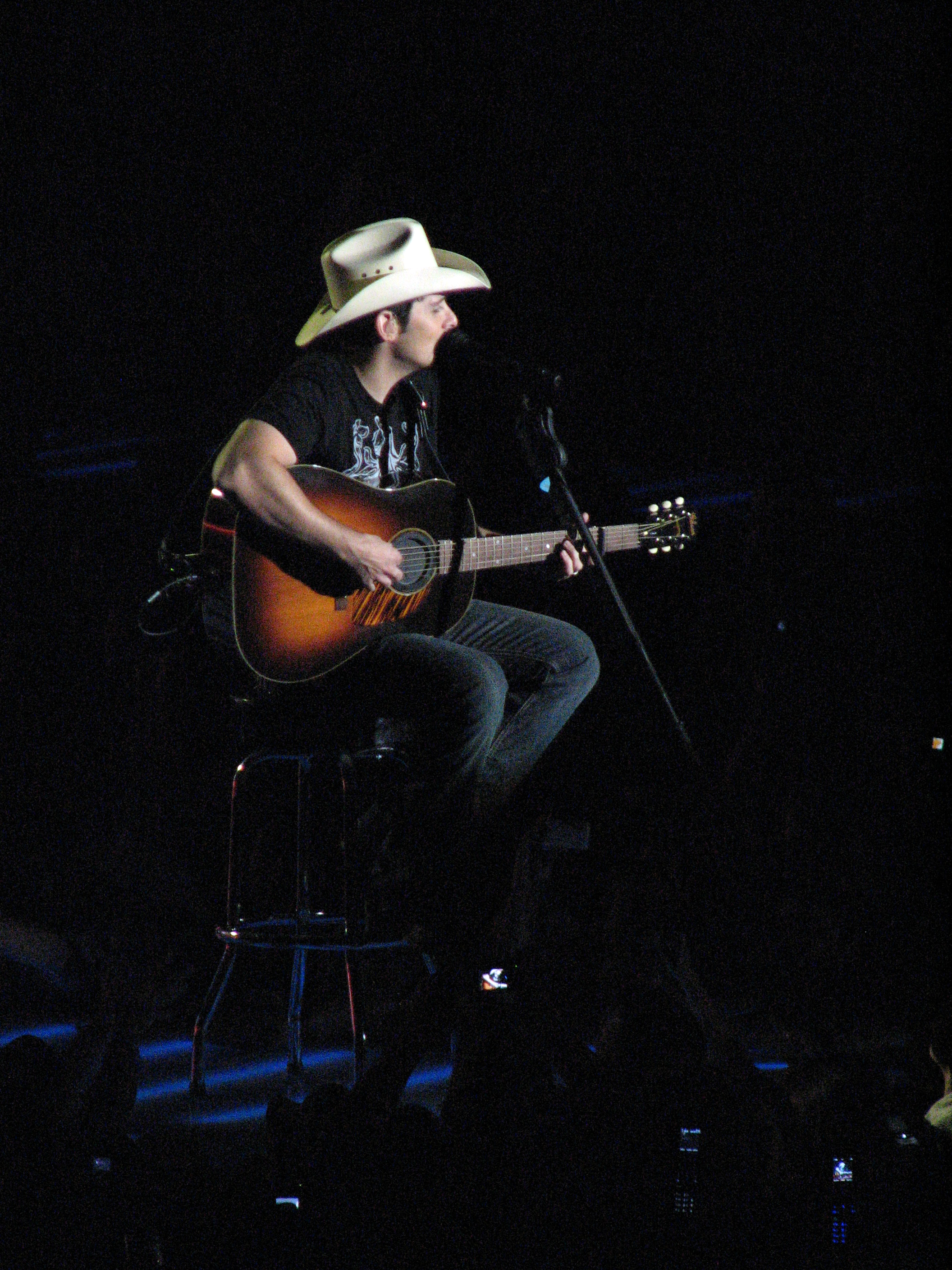
Paisley performing live in Providence, Rhode Island, September 27, 2008

In 2001, he began dating Kimberly Williams, whom he had first seen in the film Father of the Bride 10 years earlier. Paisley saw the movie while on a date with a different girl, who later left him for his best friend; four years later, he went to see the sequel alone. Paisley stated that he watched Williams' performance and thought, "She seems like a great girl—smart and funny and all those things that are so hard to find."

Paisley's sophomore album, Part II, featured several songs he had written about the old girlfriend, including one about going to see Father of the Bride. When it came time to cast the music video for "I'm Gonna Miss Her (The Fishin' Song)", Paisley said, "It felt natural to ask [Williams, the girl from the movie] to be in it." The two began dating soon after and were married on March 15, 2003, at Stauffer Chapel on the campus of Pepperdine University after a nine-month engagement. They live in Franklin, Tennessee, and had another home in Pacific Palisades that was sold in 2013 and later burned down in the 2025 Palisades Fire.

Paisley and Williams' first son, William Huckleberry, also called "Huck", was born on February 22, 2007, in Nashville. Their second son, Jasper Warren (named after his grandfather, who bought Paisley his first guitar), was born on April 17, 2009.

=== Other activities and interests ===
Paisley is an active Freemason, a member of Hiram Lodge #7 in Franklin, Tennessee. Paisley is a member of the Southern Jurisdiction of the Scottish Rite of Freemasonry, and a Noble of the AAONMS, also known as Shriners. He was accompanied by his father, Doug Paisley (33º), for the ceremony on October 28, 2006, and has done a number of recordings supporting the virtues of Freemasonry and DeMolay International. Paisley has described himself as a Christian.

Paisley is a fan of the Cleveland Browns and the Los Angeles Dodgers. Paisley sang the national anthem at Dodger Stadium before Game 2 of the 2017 World Series between the Dodgers and the Houston Astros, before Game 3 of the 2018 World Series between the Dodgers and the Boston Red Sox, before Game 1 of the 2024 World Series between the Dodgers and the New York Yankees, and before Game 3 of the 2025 World Series between the Dodgers and the Toronto Blue Jays, all of which went to extra innings, including two of them that lasted 18 innings, the longest in World Series history. Paisley also sang the national anthem before a Browns game during the 1999 season, and stated in an interview with ESPN his dream job would be to play football for them. He invited former Browns quarterback Brady Quinn to a concert at the Blossom Music Center in 2008. Paisley is a fan of West Virginia athletics and has appeared as a celebrity guest picker on College GameDay.

In late 2009, Variety announced that Paisley was the executive producer of a new hour-long scripted drama series called Nashville that would air on The CW network. It was written by Neal Dodson and Matt Bomer, with Zachary Quinto as another executive producer and Mark Schwahn as director. The pilot was not picked up for a series, and it is not the same as the show of the same name that premiered in 2012 and featured two cameo appearances from Paisley and a recurring role for his wife Kimberly Williams.

== Instruments ==
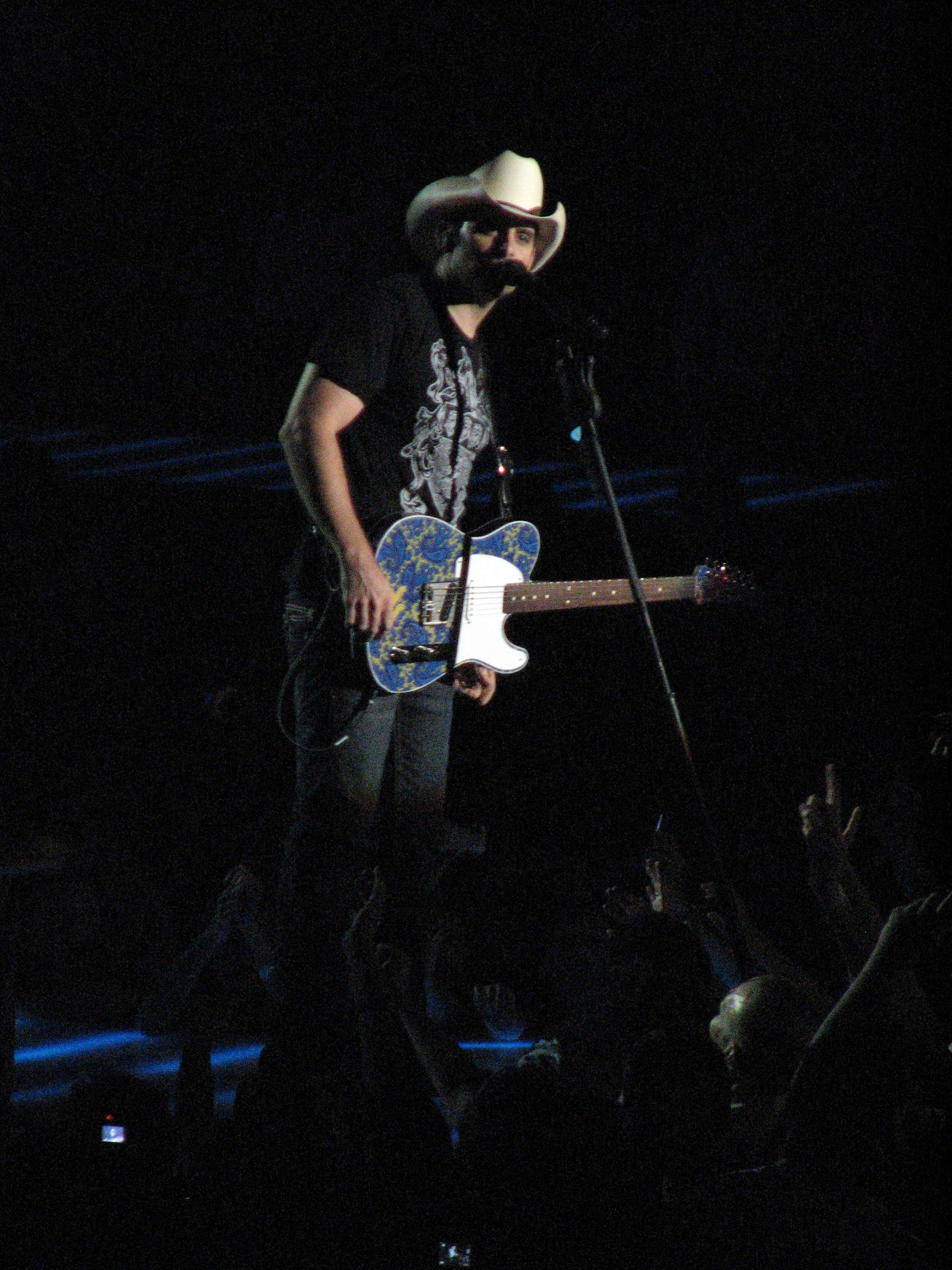
Paisley with his Crook Custom T-style

Paisley's first guitar at age 8, a gift from his grandfather, was a Silvertone Danelectro 1451, which came with an "amp-in-case". His next guitar, which he got at the age of 10 or 11, also from his grandfather, was a Sekova copy of a Gibson ES-335, with a Fender Deluxe Reverb. The instrument most often associated with him is a 1968 Pink Paisley Fender Telecaster. Brad's main guitars are Crook Custom Guitars. These guitars are designed by Bill Crook and feature the paisley wallpaper in a variety of colors.

Like many Nashville-based musicians, he lost a number of instruments and other gear in the 2010 flood in Nashville, including a 1970s Gibson Les Paul and the prototype for a Z Wreck, one of the signature Paisley Dr. Z amplifiers. The insurance money, however, allowed him to buy (from George Gruhn's store) an exclusive 1937 herringbone Martin D-28.

In 2010, Paisley and Wampler Pedals released the Brad Paisley signature Paisley Drive, a guitar overdrive pedal designed to his specifications based on the Ibanez Tube Screamer. The collaboration later continued in 2017, when the signature Paisley Deluxe overdrive was released, which combined an additional circuit based on the Nobels ODR-1 with the Paisley Drive. Paisley has also used Audiotech Guitar Products ABY Selector's for controlling his wireless receiver units.

In 2015, the Santa Cruz Guitar Company introduced the Brad Paisley Signature Model, B/PW, acoustic dreadnought guitar. Paisley is often seen playing this model of guitar, such as in the 2017 Netflix original Brad Paisley's Comedy Rodeo.

In 2016, Paisley and Dr. Z Amplification collaborated and released the DB4 model, so named because it is "Doc & Brad's fourth amp design". The pentode preamp tube is a 5879 with EL84 output tubes.

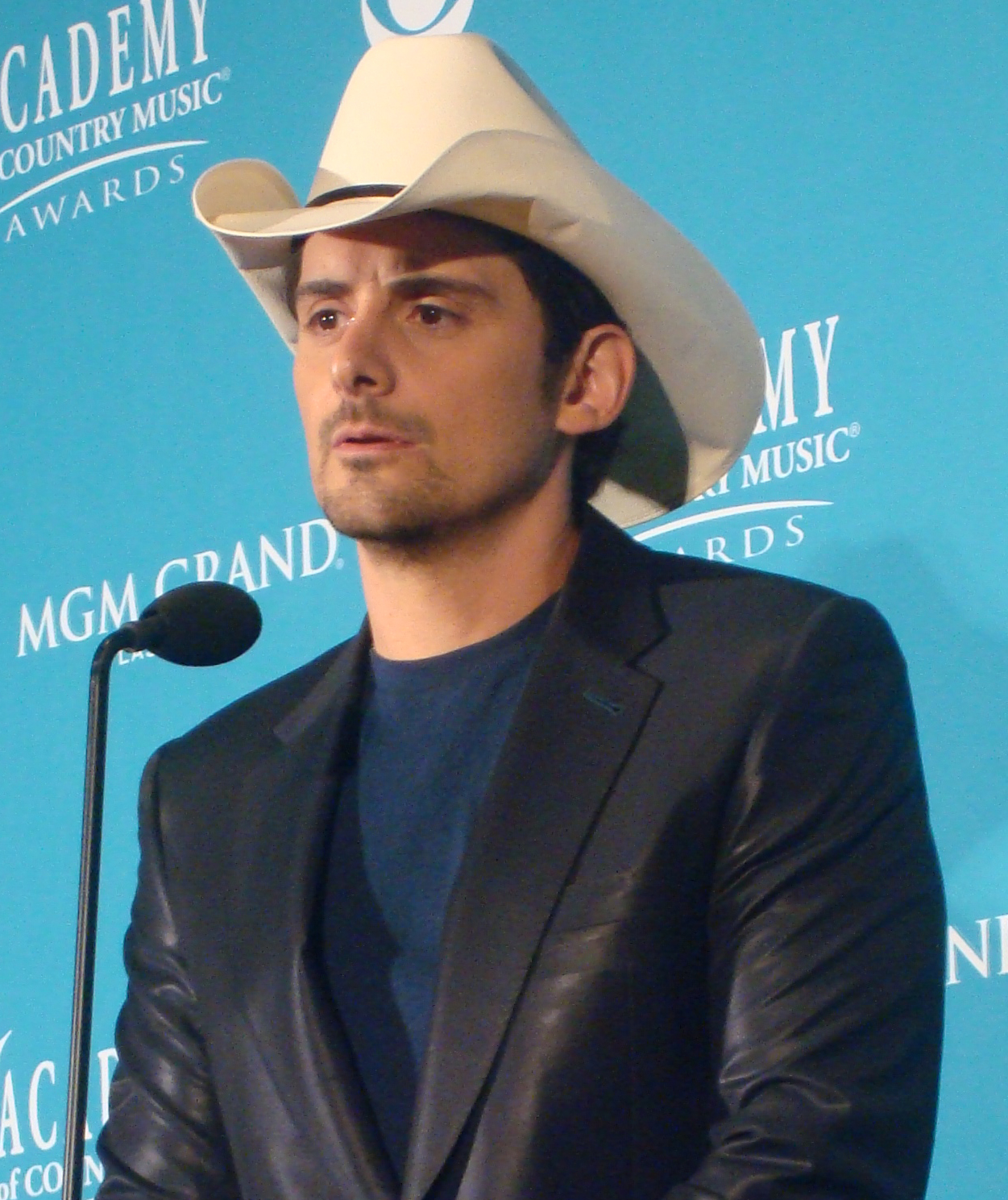
Paisley at the 45th Annual Academy of Country Music Awards, April 18, 2010

== Charity and advocacy ==
In June 2021, Paisley promoted the COVID vaccine with First Lady Jill Biden by singing a cover of "Jolene" that substituting the words "Jolene, Jolene, Jolene" with "vaccine, vaccine, vaccine". He became a vocal advocate for Ukraine after Putin announced a "special military operation" in 2022, joining the United24 project as an ambassador for its "Rebuilding Ukraine" program. In March 2023 Paisley announced that he would donate royalties from "Same Here" to rebuilding efforts.

Paisley released "The Medicine Will" in 2021 criticizing the pharmaceutical industry for its role in causing the United States opioid crisis.

=== The Store ===
Brad Paisley and Kimberly Williams-Paisley co-founded The Store, a Nashville-based non-profit that combats food insecurity by operating a free, supermarket-style grocery store designed to provide dignified shopping experiences and wrap-around services. The initiative, which recently expanded to a second location at TriStar Centennial Medical Center, serves qualified families through a referral system that provides access to fresh food and essential, non-food items.

== Filmography ==
=== Television appearances ===
| Year | Series | Role | Notes |
|---|---|---|---|
| 2002 | According to Jim | Eddie | Season 2, Episode 11: "The Brother-in-Law" |
| 2003 | According to Jim | Chad | Season 2, Episodes 13–14: "You Gotta Love Somebody (Two-part episode)" |
| 2003 | King of the Hill | Chip (Voice) | "Livin' on Reds, Vitamin C and Propane" |
| 2008–2018 | Country Music Association Awards | Himself/co-host | Alongside Carrie Underwood |
| 2012 | South Park | Guest star | "Cartman Finds Love" |
| 2012 | Nashville | Himself | 3 episodes |
| 2013 | Late Night with Jimmy Fallon | Himself | Pros & Cons – Campaigning For Anthony Weiner, Jimmy Fallon & Brad Paisley Sing "Balls In Your Mouth" |
| 2014 | Two and a Half Men | Derek | Guest role: "Oh WALD-E Good Times Ahead" |
| 2014 | Annoying Orange | Lime with Cowboy Hat | Guest Role: "Limes" |
| 2014 | The Crazy Ones | Himself | Danny Chase Hates Brad Paisley |
| 2014 | Rising Star | Expert | Along with singers Kesha and Ludacris, and Host Josh Groban. |
| 2015 | Repeat After Me | Himself | Episode 6 |
| 2015 | The Voice | Himself/Advisor | Team Blake in the Battle Rounds from Season 9. |
| 2018 | The Gong Show | Co-judge | Alongside Jason Sudeikis and Sharon Osbourne |
| 2018 | Hard Knocks | Himself | Celebrity guest |
| 2019 | America's Got Talent | Himself/Guest Judge | |
| 2019 | Brad Paisley Thinks He's Special | Himself | Special Guests: Darius Rucker, Tim McGraw, Peyton Manning, Kimberly Williams-Paisley, Carrie Underwood, Kelsea Ballerini, Jonas Brothers |
| 2020 | Jimmy Kimmel Live | Himself/Guest Host | Aired September 9 |
