= When I Get Where I'm Going =

Single by Brad Paisley and Dolly Parton

from the album Time Well Wasted
- Released: October 10, 2005
- Genre: Country, contemporary Christian
- Length: 4:08 (Album Version); 3:42 (Single Version)
- Label: Arista Nashville
- Songwriters: George Teren, Rivers Rutherford
- Producer: Frank Rogers

Brad Paisley singles chronology
"Alcohol" (2005)	"When I Get Where I'm Going" (2005)	"The World" (2006)

Dolly Parton singles chronology
"Imagine" (2005)	"When I Get Where I'm Going" (2005)	"The Twelfth of Never" (2005)

"When I Get Where I'm Going" is a song written by George Teren and Rivers Rutherford, and recorded by American country music artist Brad Paisley. It was released in October 2005 as second single from his album Time Well Wasted and is his 14th career single (not counting album cuts). The song features harmony vocals from Dolly Parton. The song was Parton's 25th and final Billboard No. 1 (and her first since 1991's "Rockin' Years") before her death in 2026, and Paisley's fifth.

== Music video ==
The video of this song was directed by Jim Shea, and features footage of Paisley singing in a forest, as well as home movies of himself with his grandfather, Warren L. Jarvis. He also holds up photos of himself with Jarvis and his aunt Rita Takach. The video was filmed in Northern California. The extended version of the video ends with Jarvis in a home movie saying "Come on in and rock a while!" and Paisley smiling when he looks up from his guitar playing and sees this. It also features many different people holding photographs of loved ones who have presumably died. Two notable people featured in this video are Michael Reagan, who is shown holding a photograph of his father Ronald Reagan, and Teresa Earnhardt, who is shown sitting in front of a painted portrait of her husband, NASCAR driver Dale Earnhardt. Although she does vocals on the song, Dolly Parton is off camera singing in the video. However, she is shown holding a picture of her grandfather, Rev. Jake Owens, who'd died a few years earlier. She kisses her hand then touches the photograph in this scene. Figure Skater Scott Hamilton is shown holding a picture of his mother. John Carter Cash is featured holding a photo of his parents, Johnny Cash and June Carter Cash. Also in the video is Pixar director John Lasseter holding up a picture of co-director and fellow CalArts alumnus Joe Ranft who suddenly died in 2005 in a car accident. Various unknown people hold up photos of relatives who have passed on throughout as well. In 2007, after the Virginia Tech massacre, the last slide was dedicated to those lost with the VT emblem shining brightly. On tour in 2008, Paisley also added a picture of actor Heath Ledger.

== Critical reception ==
Kevin John Coyne, reviewing the song for Country Universe, gave it a negative rating. He says that Dolly Parton helped "get this song across the finish line" and states that Paisley is "essentially Bob Saget in a cowboy hat." Dan MacIntosh of Country Standard Time was more positive, calling the song a "certified inspirational winner".

== Awards ==
The song was nominated for a Dove Award for Country Recorded Song of the Year released by Rick Hendrix Company for the 37th GMA Dove Awards.

It won 2 Academy of Country Music Awards for Video of the Year, Vocal Event of the Year and was nominated for Song of the Year.

The song also won a Country Music Association Award for Vocal Event of the Year and was nominated for Single and Video of the Year.

== Cover versions ==
This song was covered by contemporary Christian music artist Geoff Moore in 2007 on his album Speak to Me. Moore's version was a Top 15 hit on the Hot Christian Songs and Hot Christian Adult Contemporary charts. In 2007, Christian contemporary trio 33Miles covered "When I Get Where I'm Going" on their self titled debut album. This song was also covered by Susie McEntire on her latest album Passages in 2010. In 2015, Chris Crump and Krista Hughes make a song choice selected covered the battle song in The Voice (U.S. season 9).

== Chart performance ==
=== Brad Paisley and Dolly Parton version ===
The song debuted at number 50 on the U.S. Billboard Hot Country Singles & Tracks for the week ending October 8, 2005. It has sold 1,021,000 digital copies in the US as of October 2015.

Chart (2005–2006)	Peak position
Canada Country (Radio & Records)	2
US Billboard Hot 100	39
US Hot Country Songs (Billboard)	1

==== Year-end charts ====
Chart (2006)	Position
US Country Songs (Billboard)	22

=== Geoff Moore version ===
Chart (2007)	Peak position
U.S. Billboard Hot Christian Songs	14
U.S. Billboard Hot Christian Adult Contemporary	13

== Certifications ==
Region	Certification	Certified units/sales
Canada (Music Canada)	Platinum	80,000^{‡}
United States (RIAA)	Platinum	1,000,000^{‡}
^{‡} Sales+streaming figures based on certification alone.
