= Southern Comfort Zone =

Single by Brad Paisley

from the album Wheelhouse
- Released: September 27, 2012
- Recorded: 2012
- Genre: Country
- Length: 5:20 (album version); 4:34 (radio edit)
- Label: Arista Nashville
- Songwriters: Brad Paisley; Kelley Lovelace; Chris DuBois
- Producer: Brad Paisley

Brad Paisley singles chronology
"Camouflage" (2011)	"Southern Comfort Zone" (2012)	"Beat This Summer" (2013)

"Southern Comfort Zone" is a song co-written and recorded by American country music singer Brad Paisley. It was released on September 27, 2012, as the lead single from his 2013 album Wheelhouse. Paisley wrote this song with Kelley Lovelace and Chris DuBois.

The song received positive reviews from critics who commended Paisley's delivery of powerful lyrics over a grand melody. "Southern Comfort Zone" peaked at numbers 2 and 10 on the Billboard Country Airplay and Hot Country Songs charts respectively. It also charted at number 54 on the Billboard Hot 100. It received similar chart success in Canada, peaking at number 2 on the Country chart and number 58 on the Canadian Hot 100.

The accompanying music video for the song was directed by Jim Shea.

== Content ==
The song is a celebration of the Southern United States lifestyle while giving recognition to other parts of the world. Paisley said of its lyrical content, "I'm encouraging people to take a look around. There's some great places around the world that will expand your mind and also make you love this Southern comfort zone." Included on the song are snippets of Jeff Foxworthy, The Andy Griffith Show, Eddie Stubbs, a NASCAR race, and bars of the traditional song "Dixie" sung by the Brentwood Baptist Church choir, which lends the song an anthem quality.

== Critical reception ==
Billy Dukes of Taste of Country gave the song 4 stars out of 5, saying that "Paisley’s understated delivery (combined with a lovable personality) allows him to pack the punch he’s been working toward." Giving it a full 5 stars, Matt Bjorke of Roughstock said that "The melody is epic and grand" while also praising the lyrics. Ben Foster of Country Universe gave the song a D− grade, calling it "tasteless" and "a misguided, watery mess."

== Music video ==
The music video was directed by Jim Shea and premiered on Ustream on December 10, 2012.

== Chart performance ==
"Southern Comfort Zone" debuted at number 25 on the Hot Country Songs chart dated October 6, 2012. It also debuted at number 73 on the U.S. Billboard Hot 100 chart for the week of October 20, 2012. It also debuted at number 58 on the Canadian Hot 100 chart for the week of October 20, 2012. It reached number 2 on the Country Airplay chart dated February 23, 2013 and fell off the chart the following week, making it the first song to fall off the chart from the number 2 position since Rodney Atkins' "These Are My People" in September 2007.

Chart (2012–2013)	Peak position
Canada Hot 100 (Billboard)	58
Canada Country (Billboard)	2
US Billboard Hot 100	54
US Hot Country Songs (Billboard)	10
US Country Airplay (Billboard)	2

=== Year-end charts ===
Chart (2012)	Position
US Hot Country Songs (Billboard)	82

Chart (2013)	Position
US Country Airplay (Billboard)	52
US Hot Country Songs (Billboard)	58
