= Alcohol (Brad Paisley song) =

2005 single by Brad Paisley

Single by Brad Paisley

from the album Time Well Wasted
- Released: May 9, 2005
- Recorded: 2005
- Genre: Country
- Length: 4:52 (album version); 4:09 (single version)
- Label: Arista Nashville
- Songwriter: Brad Paisley
- Producer: Frank Rogers

Brad Paisley singles chronology
"Mud on the Tires" (2004)	"Alcohol" (2005)	"When I Get Where I'm Going" (2005)

"Alcohol" is a song written and recorded by American country music singer Brad Paisley. It was released on May 9, 2005, as the lead single from Paisley's album Time Well Wasted (2005), reaching number 4 on the Billboard Hot Country Songs chart. It also peaked at number 28 on the U.S. Billboard Hot 100. It was nominated for two Grammys: Best Country Song and Best Country Male Vocal. Joseph Gordon-Levitt covered it in 2011.

== Content ==
The song is a mid-tempo in 6/8 time signature and the key of C major, but down tuned in the original recording. In the song, Paisley personifies alcoholic beverages in general, describing the various influences that the beverages have on certain people (such as "Helping white people dance"), and the effects it can have on one's life ("I can make you new friends, or get you fired from work"), ultimately stating "You'll have some of the best times you'll never remember, with me, Alcohol".

== Critical reception ==
Kevin John Coyne, reviewing the song for Country Universe, gave it a positive rating. He says that Paisley pulls the song off with "good taste and great humor."

== Music video ==
The music video was directed by Jim Shea. It features Little Jimmy Dickens, who puts a lampshade on his head. It was released in June 2005. A newer, 3D live version of the video, directed by Scott Scovill, was released in late 2010.

== Chart performance ==
The song debuted at number 60 on the U.S. Billboard Hot Country Singles & Tracks for the week ending May 7, 2005.

Chart (2005)	Peak position
Canada Country (Radio & Records)	6
US Billboard Hot 100	28
US Hot Country Songs (Billboard)	4

=== Year-end charts ===
Chart (2005)	Position
US Country Songs (Billboard)	24

== Certifications ==
Region	Certification	Certified units/sales
Canada (Music Canada)	Gold	40,000^{‡}
United States (RIAA)	Gold	500,000^{*}
Ringtone
United States (RIAA)	Gold	500,000^{*}
^{*} Sales figures based on certification alone.^{‡} Sales+streaming figures based on certification alone.
