= The Mona Lisa (song) =

Single by Brad Paisley

from the album Wheelhouse
- Released: December 9, 2013
- Genre: Country
- Length: 3:54 (album version); 3:25 (radio edit)
- Label: Arista Nashville
- Songwriter(s): Brad Paisley; Chris DuBois
- Producer(s): Brad Paisley

Brad Paisley singles chronology
"I Can't Change the World" (2013)	"The Mona Lisa" (2013)	"River Bank" (2014)

"The Mona Lisa" is a song recorded by American country music artist Brad Paisley. It was released in December 2013 as the fourth and final single from his ninth studio album, Wheelhouse. Paisley wrote the song with Chris DuBois. While rarely played during his American concert tours, the song has been adopted by UK country fans, who will often form a conga line (dubbed the 'Mona Conga') when the song is played at country music club nights or other public events, including Paisley's own concerts, where the song has become a staple of the setlist at his European shows.

== Background ==
Although the song was inspired by Paisley's viewing of Leonardo da Vinci's masterpiece, Mona Lisa, in the Louvre museum in Paris, Paisley has said that the singularly exciting element of the song came courtesy of his fans. Paisley recalls that "in the big refrain to 'The Mona Lisa', there are actually 10,000 people recorded live in Saratoga Springs, New York. In concert, I said, 'who wants to be on the new album?' and what you hear at the end of the song is the audience singing the whoas".

== Critical reception ==
Alanna Conaway of Country Weekly gave the song an A−, writing that "between the well-crafted lyric, infectious melody and signature guitar riffs, 'The Mona Lisa' has full potential to be yet another chart-topping release for Brad." The song received a favorable review from Taste of Country, which said that "the singer again shows that his songwriting skills are only bested by his guitar playing."

== Chart performance ==
"The Mona Lisa" debuted at number 59 on the U.S. Billboard Country Airplay chart for the week of December 7, 2013. It also debuted at number 47 on the U.S. Billboard Hot Country Songs chart for the week of January 4, 2014. It also debuted at number 19 on the U.S. Billboard Bubbling Under Hot 100 Singles chart for the week of February 15, 2014. While in the U.S. 'The Mona Lisa' was one of the less successful of Paisley's singles, it entered the UK Singles Chart at #100 on week ending March 22, 2014, becoming Paisley's first UK top 100 single.

Chart (2013–2014)	Peak position
Canada Country (Billboard)	38
UK Singles (OCC)	100
US Bubbling Under Hot 100 Singles (Billboard)	5
US Country Airplay (Billboard)	19
US Hot Country Songs (Billboard)	24

=== Year-end charts ===
Chart (2014)	Position
US Country Airplay (Billboard)	81
US Hot Country Songs (Billboard)	99
