= Wheelhouse (album) =

Studio album by Brad Paisley
- Released: April 9, 2013
- Studios: Wheelhouse (Nashville, Tennessee); Blackbird (Nashville, Tennessee); Station West (Nashville, Tennessee); The Doghouse (Nashville, Tennessee); Cash And Chips (London, UK)
- Genre: Country
- Length: 63:16
- Label: Arista Nashville
- Producers: Brad Paisley (all tracks), Mike Dean (track 4), Marten Aston (track 6)

Brad Paisley chronology
| This Is Country Music (2011) | Wheelhouse (2013) | Moonshine in the Trunk (2014) |

Singles from Wheelhouse
- 1. "Southern Comfort Zone" Released: September 27, 2012; 2. "Beat This Summer" Released: March 4, 2013; 3. "I Can't Change the World" Released: August 19, 2013; 4. "The Mona Lisa" Released: December 9, 2013

Wheelhouse is the tenth studio album by American country music artist Brad Paisley. The album was released on April 9, 2013 by Arista Nashville, with Paisley being the only producer on the album instead of Frank Rogers.

== Background ==
The album was recorded at Paisley's home in Franklin, Tennessee, which in order to do this he "converted the yellow farmhouse on his property to a studio, which allowed him to work on the album at all hours of the day and night."

== Music and lyrics ==
With respect to subject matter, The New York Times Jon Caramanica noted how Paisley "tackles a host of country pieties out in the open, as if sensing the moment might finally be right to hear country songs about difference." Daryl Addison of GAC found that this album was an "adventurous undertaking". At the Los Angeles Times, Randy Lewis affirmed that Paisley "taking on such hot-button topics as spousal abuse, Southern provincialism, racism and social justice alongside characteristically well-crafted mainstream country fare." To this, Jerry Shirver of USA Today exclaimed "bravo to Brad Paisley for being among the wave of mainstream country artists who keep prodding the genre into the here and now, lyrically and musically." So, Caramanica found that "by being studiously strait-laced, though, Mr. Paisley is exactly the type of person who might slip in unnoticed and effect change." However, AllMusic's Stephen Thomas Erlewine alluded to how the album "suffers when the cross-cultural ambition is too great." Spin magazine's Jason Gubbels writes this is because Paisley "forgot his moral insights have always functioned best as ambiguities, not set pieces."

Bernard Perusse of The Gazette said the album features "catchy melodies, plainspoken lyrics and one man's attempt to transplant contemporary country from its red-state ghetto into the hearts of everyone." Taste of Country's Billy Dukes told that "'Wheelhouse' delivers a familiar mix of humor, life lessons and scorching guitar solos, but it does it in a way different from any of the other eight albums the...singer has released," which he evoked how Paisley "took his old formula, balled it up, lit it on fire and tossed the ashes in the garbage". In addition, Lewis of the Los Angeles Times found that the music is packaged up "in an arena-ready singalong," that Paisley "tacitly inviting listeners to sample his perspective." At The Boston Globe, Scott McLennan praised the writing on this album as being "sharp". Addison of GAC found that with Paisley "producing and writing/co-writing every song himself, Brad delivers 14 full songs that are incredibly thoughtful, well crafted and willing to take risks without losing what fans love most – his personality and clever songwriting."

On the topic of musical styling, McLennan of The Boston Globe told that "Paisley cooks through honky-tonk, country swing, the blues, rockabilly, and weepy ballads with assured command, topping off each song with at least one memorable line". Lastly, Bob Paxman of Country Weekly surmised that "with clever splices of sonic experimentation and songs that run from fanciful to downright serious, Wheelhouse seems to stand as Brad's Sgt. Pepper's Lonely Hearts Club Band", which it is not "quite that monumental, to be clear", but does give the listener a "declarative statement that Brad is branching out in a more divergent path than ever before." At The New York Times, Caramanica alluded to how "Mr. Paisley isn’t pushing musical boundaries, but that’s by design: the messages would matter less if they were coming from someone other than a country insider."

With respect to the album duration, Roughstock's Matt Bjorke felt the work was rather long in terms of duration it "just [seemed] too ambitious for an artist not exactly known for being all that ambitious" musically, yet he hoped "that Brad maintains some of the juju found on this record -- the explorations of other genres w/o abandoning Country Music's bedrock instruments -- and reigns himself in a little bit on his next album." In agreement, Taste of Country's Dukes said that "seventeen tracks are too many, even if a few are little more than interludes", yet Paisley "earns an extra half star for some daring production," which "a lack of momentum holds back a project that’s full of good ideas spaced apart."

In terms of guitar playing, Gary Graff of The Oakland Press praised Paisley for his instrument playing acumen, when he said "there's nothing at all funny about Paisley’s guitar chops, which are still sharp throughout these 17 tracks." Also, McLennan commented that the guitar work is "impeccable." Paxman of Country Weekly vowed that "the musicianship on Wheelhouse is incredible and Brad just keeps on getting more flavorful as a guitarist". At Premier Guitar Jason Shadrick evoked how Paisley "continues to take chances and push modern country away from the auto-tuned sing-alongs with a simple twist of his B-bender," which he even "throws in just enough EL84-powered twang and Stones-inspired double stops to keep the guitar nerd’s eyes from glazing over". In addition, Chuck Eddy of Rolling Stone noted that "as always, plenty of tasty guitar" from Paisley is featured on the album. Lastly, GAC's Addison proclaimed Paisley a "virtuoso guitar lick." However, Robert Christgau of MSN Music was not so praiseworthy about Paisley on guitar, when he wrote that "a lot of the time he's trying too hard to say too little or trying too clumsily to say too much, sometimes even with his trusty guitar."

== Songs ==
The songs on the album touches on various aspects such as xenophobia with "Southern Comfort Zone", domestic violence with "Karate", racism with "Accidental Racist" and religion with "Those Crazy Christians". "Southern Comfort Zone" has been described as a "cousins of sorts to his multi-cultural paean 'American Saturday Night'", and the song "preaches the value of travel while masking it in a wistfulness for the familiarity of home." "Beat This Summer" has been described as "the perfect summer anthem". The song "Outstanding in Our Field" has been called a "party anthem". "Pressing on a Bruise" is a ballad that has some rap on it by Mat Kearney. The song "I Can't Change the World" is a "poignant ballad" that contains "fingerpicked acoustic guitar with wavering pedal steel start off the track before he enters on vocals", but even though this is a "smartly written love song" Paisley "doesn’t quite have the pathos to deliver."

The song "'Onryo' offers up fun around the horn solos, but the focus here is on the songwriting." "Karate" has been referenced as being like "Martina McBride's 'Independence Day,' the Dixie Chicks' 'Goodbye Earl,' and Miranda Lambert's 'Gunpowder & Lead,'" which because "Mr. Paisley may be the first male singer to approach the subject with such a honed sense of justice" in mind that he "pulls off with grace." The song "Harvey Bodine" is "about a henpecked man who dies, finds himself at more peace in death than in life and then, after he’s been resuscitated, decides to leave his wife", which the death lasted just "five minutes". "Tin Can on a String" has been portrayed as "a ballad of lost love", which "Paisley sings of being stood up at the altar. His emotion is grandly showcased on this track and you can't help but feel for the character in the song." The song "Death of a Single Man" has been noted that it "reads like a funeral, but it describes a wedding", which it is "the perfect single man's anthem." "The Mona Lisa" has been described as "a love song" that was "inspired by a trip to Paris with his wife, actress Kimberly Williams-Paisley, the fast paced track impresses with gritty guitar."

The song "Accidental Racist" featuring LL Cool J is "a don’t-judge-a-book-by-its-cover polemic", which to some "this has about as much sociological insight as a fortune cookie." In addition, this song has been derided as "far less successful than 'Over and Over,' the 2004 collaboration between Tim McGraw and Nelly, and a far less reconciliatory one too." On the other hand, it was seen as a song that is an "honest discussion about race". "Runaway Train" is a "fast-paced" song that "lets loose for some of the project’s most impressive axe-slinging and the cowboy instrumental". The song "Those Crazy Christians" is where Paisley "admires faith while harboring doubts of his own, never taking potshots at those who believe", and it "deftly tweaks and salutes the faithful among whom Paisley grew up." Yet, some see it as approaching "massive Christian stereotypes from the eyes of a nonbeliever." "Officially Alive" has been called "anthemic" that is "part autobiographical".

== Critical reception ==
Professional ratings
Review scores
| Source | Rating |
|---|---|
| AllMusic | 3/5 stars |
| Billboard | 85/100 |
| Country Weekly | B+ |
| The Independent | 4/5 stars |
| Los Angeles Times | 3.5/4 stars |
| MSN Music (Expert Witness) | B+ |
| Premier Guitar | 3/5 stars |
| Rolling Stone | 3/5 stars |
| Spin | 8/10 |
| USA Today | 3/4 stars |

Wheelhouse has received mostly positive reviews from critics. At Metacritic, a website that assigns a weighted average score out of 100 from reviews by mainstream critics, it currently holds a Metascore of 76, based on 10 reviews. At the Los Angeles Times, Lewis affirmed that "Brad Paisley ratchets up his Bard-like savvy on 'Wheelhouse,'" but it is done with "Paisley's master stroke is to mine empathy — not frustration — from that experience, still embracing his core values while quietly extending others the same courtesy." At The Oakland Press, Graff wrote that with respect to this album, it is just "as good a time as anything he’s recorded" in the past. Shriver of the USA Today exclaimed that "a genuine honesty and sincerity shine through" in his music on this album. At The Gazette, Perusse found that "Wheelhouse does live up to its name". Taste of Country's Dukes rated the album three-and-a-half-stars-out-of-five, and wrote "the result is a meaty and ambitious project that doesn’t always click, but clears new ground when it does." At Billboard, Annie Reuter vowed that "Paisley still knows how to have a good time" even though the material here is quite weighty. McLennan of The Boston Globe gave a positive review, when he wrote "Brad Paisley can swing for the top of the charts and not lose any respect in the process." At Country Weekly, Paxman noted that "serious music buffs are going to love Wheelhouse, while cursory fans may be left scratching their heads", and this is because "that’s what happens when you refuse to play it safe."

NPR's music critic Will Hermes affirmed that "the jury's still out on his therapeutic approach, but as a musician, he's at the top of his game." GAC's Addison claimed that "when the joyous anthem 'Officially Alive' arrives to close the album, the total impact of Wheelhouse is felt with a daring and adventurous collection full of striking emotion to create one of the year’s best releases." At Spin, Jason Gubbels felt that outside "Accidental Racist" the album has "16 other rather good songs", but felt that "Paisley's desire to step outside his comfort zone now seems eerily presaged by the figure emblazoned on Wheelhouse's cover, plunging into the void." MSN Music's critic Christgau found the album to contain "two or three great songs and a fair number of pretty good ones". Andy Gill of The Independent stated that "on the excellent Wheelhouse, Brad Paisley tiptoes a fine line between satisfying his core country audience and encouraging them to more adventurous attitudes."

Conversely, Allmusic music critic Erlewine claimed that the title "Wheelhouse, is a fake-out" in comparison to his previous album, but that "throughout the album, Paisley finds something to celebrate in every little corner of the world, or at the very least, the countries where his career has taken him." At Premier Guitar, Shadrick found that "Wheelhouse is Paisley’s most pop-sounding album to date, and with that, makes me wonder how long it will be before that vitamin that you stick in the cupcake disappears completely." PopMatters's Dave Heaton gave the album a six-out-of-ten, and alluded to how Paisley has a "limited" wheelhouse "intellectually". At Rolling Stone, Eddy affirmed that "Brad Paisley's latest is so well meaning it's tempting to forgive how overwrought it is", which is because "two tracks that subject the South to tough love" in "Southern Comfort Zone" and "Accidental Racist" "feel confused". Roughstock's Matt Bjorke told that "Wheelhouse is a different album for Brad Paisley", which is the reason he rated it two-and-a-half-out-of-five-stars, but felt that "Wheelhouse is a record that Brad Paisley had to make -- it's a record that every artist of his stature needs to make -- at some point in his career. It's certainly risk-taking in many places and certainly instrumentally interesting but it still feels…lacking."

== Commercial performance ==
The album debuted at #1 in the Billboard Top Country Albums chart, selling over 100,000 copies in the first week, becoming Paisley's seventh number one album. It also peaked at #2 in Billboard 200, behind Paramore's self-titled album. As of June 12, 2013, the album has sold 207,000 copies in the U.S.

== Track listing ==
Standard edition
| No. | Title | Writer(s) | Length |
|---|---|---|---|
| 1. | "Bon Voyage" | Walter Donaldson; Sam M. Lewis; Joe Young | 0:19 |
| 2. | "Southern Comfort Zone" | Brad Paisley; Chris DuBois; Kelley Lovelace | 5:16 |
| 3. | "Beat This Summer" | Paisley, DuBois, Luke Laird | 4:41 |
| 4. | "Outstanding in Our Field" (featuring Dierks Bentley and Roger Miller with Hunter Hayes on guitar) | Paisley; DuBois; Mike Dean; Lee Thomas Miller; Roger Miller | 4:02 |
| 5. | "Pressing On a Bruise" (featuring Mat Kearney) | Paisley; Kearney; Lovelace | 3:17 |
| 6. | "I Can't Change the World" | Paisley; DuBois; Lovelace | 4:41 |
| 7. | "幽女 (Onryo)" (meaning "Quiet Female") (Instrumental) | Paisley; Justin Williamson; Randle Currie | 1:39 |
| 8. | "Karate" (featuring Charlie Daniels) | Paisley; DuBois; Lovelace | 4:04 |
| 9. | "Death of a Married Man" (featuring Eric Idle) | Paisley | 0:47 |
| 10. | "Harvey Bodine" | Paisley; DuBois; Lovelace | 3:28 |
| 11. | "Tin Can On a String" | Paisley; Lovelace; Ashley Gorley | 4:08 |
| 12. | "Death of a Single Man" | Paisley; Lovelace; L. Miller | 4:24 |
| 13. | "The Mona Lisa" | Paisley; DuBois | 3:54 |
| 14. | "Accidental Racist" (featuring LL Cool J) | Paisley; L. Miller; James Todd Smith | 5:51 |
| 15. | "Runaway Train" | Paisley; DuBois; Lovelace | 4:28 |
| 16. | "Those Crazy Christians" | Paisley; Lovelace | 4:21 |
| 17. | "Officially Alive" | Paisley | 3:56 |
| Total length: | | | 1:03:16 |

Deluxe edition
| No. | Title | Writer(s) | Length |
|---|---|---|---|
| 18. | "Yankee Doodle Dixie" | traditional, arr.: Chet Atkins; Paisley | 1:12 |
| 19. | "Facebook Friends" | Paisley; DuBois; Lovelace | 4:10 |
| 20. | "Get Even" | Paisley; Tim Paul Owens | 3:25 |
| 21. | "Southern Comfort Zone" (acoustic version) | Paisley; DuBois; Lovelace | 4:37 |
| Total length: | | | 1:16:35 |

Cracker Barrel special edition
| No. | Title | Writer(s) | Length |
|---|---|---|---|
| 18. | "Only Way She'll Stay" | Paisley; DuBois | 3:15 |
| 19. | "She Never Really Got Over Him" | Paisley; Robert Arthur | 3:05 |
| 20. | "Beat This Summer" (acoustic) | Paisley; DuBois; Laird | 3:38 |
| Total length: | | | 1:13:14 |

== Personnel ==
Adapted from liner notes.

- Brad Paisley – lead vocals, backing vocals, acoustic guitar, electric guitar, banjo, acoustic mandolin, electric mandolin, programming
- Kendall Marcy – acoustic piano, keyboards, organ, programming, banjo, percussion, backing vocals
- Luke Laird – additional programming (3)
- Mike Dean – programming (4)
- Gordon Mote – acoustic piano (11)
- Ethel Lunn – acoustic piano on congregation singing "Softly & Tenderly" (16)
- Gary Hooker – acoustic guitar, electric guitar, six-string bass guitar
- Hunter Hayes – electric guitar (4)
- Randle Currie – dobro, pedal steel guitar
- Justin Williamson – acoustic mandolin, electric mandolin, cello, fiddle, viola
- Kenny Lewis – bass, backing vocals
- Luke Wooten – additional bass (3)
- Ben Sesar – drums
- The Brentwood Baptist Worship Choir – choir
- Cliff Duren – choir director
- Dennis Worley – choir director
- Arthur Fields – featured vocals (1)
- Carl Jackson – backing vocals (4, 15)
- Dierks Bentley – harmony vocals (4)
- Roger Miller – featured vocals and vocal samples (4)
- Mat Kearney – lead vocals (5)
- Sheryl Crow – backing vocals (8)
- Charlie Daniels – lead vocals (8)
- Eric Idle – featured vocals (9)
- LL Cool J – featured vocals (14)
- Chris Stapleton – choral backing vocals (14)

== Production ==
- Brad Paisley – producer
- Mike Dean – producer (4)
- Marten Aston – producer (6), mixing (6, 7), additional engineer
- Neal Cappellino – additional production, recording, tracking, mixing (11, 16)
- Kendal Marcy – associate producer, tracking, mixing (9)
- Chris DuBois – executive producer, additional engineer
- Richard Barrow – additional tracking
- Brian David Willis – additional tracking
- Marcus Johnson – additional engineer
- Kelley Lovelace – additional engineer
- Chris Meece – additional engineer
- Lee Thomas Miller – additional engineer
- Steve Rusch – additional engineer
- Luke Wooten – mixing (1, 3, 4, 8, 10, 12, 14, 15, 17), additional production (14)
- Justin Niebank – mixing (2, 5, 13)
- Kyle Manner – mix assistant (1, 3, 4, 8, 10, 12, 14, 15, 17)
- Drew Bollman – mix assistant (2, 5, 13)
- Bob Ludwig – mastering
- Gateway Mastering (Portland, Maine) – mastering location
- Dave Rouze – studio manager, guitar technician
- Scott Johnson – production assistant
- Varnish Studio Inc. – design
- Ben Enos – cover photography
- Jim Shea – package photography

== Chart performance ==
=== Weekly charts ===
| Chart (2013) | Peak position |
|---|---|
| Canadian Albums Chart | 2 |
| US Billboard 200 | 2 |
| US Billboard Top Country Albums | 1 |

=== Year-end charts ===
| Chart (2013) | Position |
|---|---|
| US Billboard 200 | 100 |
| US Top Country Albums (Billboard) | 23 |
