= She's Everything =

Single by Brad Paisley

from the album Time Well Wasted
- Released: August 28, 2006
- Genre: Country
- Length: 3:51 (single edit); 4:26 (album version)
- Label: Arista Nashville
- Songwriters: Wil Nance; Brad Paisley
- Producer: Frank Rogers

Brad Paisley singles chronology
"The World" (2006)	"She's Everything" (2006)	"Ticks" (2007)

"She's Everything" is a song co-written and recorded by American country music artist Brad Paisley. It reached the top of the Billboard Hot Country Songs Chart. It was released in August 2006 as the fourth and final single from Paisley's album Time Well Wasted. It was Paisley's seventh number one single. The song is featured on co-writer Wil Nance's self-named album as the number one track, published by Hillbilly Willy Songs, BMI. It is one of Paisley's four songs certified 2× Platinum by the Recording Industry Association of America, the other being "Then", "Whiskey Lullaby", and "Remind Me". This marks Brad Paisley's first song to debut his usage of a Fender Stratocaster electric guitar even though he frequently uses Fender Telecaster as his main electric guitar.

== Background and writing ==
The music and lyrics were written by Wil Nance, for his wife, Holly. Brad re-wrote a small portion of the lyrics to personalize the song more closely to his own life.

== Music video ==
A music video was directed by Scott Scovill, and features Brad Paisley on his tour.

== Chart performance ==
Chart (2006–2007)	Peak position
Canada Country (Billboard)	1
US Billboard Hot 100	35
US Hot Country Songs (Billboard)	1

=== Year-end charts ===
Chart (2007)	Position
US Country Songs (Billboard)	30

== Certifications ==
Region	Certification	Certified units/sales
Canada (Music Canada)	Gold	40,000^{‡}
United States (RIAA)	2× Platinum	1,830,000
^{‡} Sales+streaming figures based on certification alone.
