= Beat This Summer =

Single by Brad Paisley

from the album Wheelhouse
- Released: March 4, 2013
- Recorded: 2013
- Genre: Country
- Length: 4:41 (album version); 3:58 (radio edit)
- Label: Arista Nashville
- Songwriters: Brad Paisley; Chris DuBois; Luke Laird
- Producer: Brad Paisley

Brad Paisley singles chronology
"Southern Comfort Zone" (2012)	"Beat This Summer" (2013)	"I Can't Change the World" (2013)

"Beat This Summer" is a song co-written and recorded by American country music artist Brad Paisley. It was released in March 2013 as the second single from his 2013 album Wheelhouse. Paisley co-wrote this song with Chris DuBois and Luke Laird.

== Content ==
"Beat This Summer" is a moderate up-tempo song about a male narrator meeting a lover on summer vacation.

== Critical reception ==
Billy Dukes of Taste of Country gave the song four stars out of five, saying that "the singer stretches himself vocally, going for notes late in the song that he typically stays away from. As a producer, Paisley and his team add a few effects and techniques that separate this song from anything else he’s recorded." Chuck Dauphin of Roughstock wrote that the song is "very different from what you might expect from Brad" and that he is "longing for simpler arrangements from Paisley." Giving it a "thumbs up", Karlie Justus Marlowe of Engine 145 said that "The contrast in swirling instrumentation and simple lyric delivery is stark and successful, adding interest and spark. But here, the storyline isn’t so much the focus as is it is the feeling of frenetic love with an expiration date", although she thought that the amount of production "very nearly goes into overload".

== Music video ==
The music video was directed by Roman White and premiered in April 2013. It was filmed on the Santa Monica boardwalk and on Santa Monica Beach in California. Brad himself only appears during the video's final scenes, starting with the second line of the final chorus, at 3.5 minutes in. It tells the story of 2 kids, one male and one female, who meet on the boardwalk and spend the day doing various activities together, including having a tea party on the beach, going on rides, and playing and winning several games. When night falls, they are seen on a carousel together and the male lead is sporting a cowboy hat (possibly referencing a young Paisley.) The female's mother is then seen looking out her window, looking at her watch, and calling her in. She doesn't notice at first, but the mother eventually pulls her out. She then pulls her hand away from her mother, and goes to kiss the boy, before finally getting in the car with her mother (she is looking out the rear mirror with her hands in the air, referencing the fact that she wants to stay with the boy) and leaving. The video ends with a scene revealing that the whole video was a past memory, panning out to reveal that the boy was actually a younger version of Paisley himself. It ends with a note that the girl wrote in the sand, which reads "S+B" in a heart.

== Chart performance ==
"Beat This Summer" debuted at number 40 on the U.S. Billboard Country Airplay chart for the week of March 16, 2013. It also debuted at number 29 on the U.S. Billboard Hot Country Songs chart for the week of March 23, 2013. It also debuted at number 97 on the U.S. Billboard Hot 100 chart for the week of March 23, 2013. It also debuted at number 86 on the Canadian Hot 100 chart for the week of March 23, 2013. As of August 2013, the single has sold 532,000 copies in the United States.

Chart (2013)	Peak position
Canada Hot 100 (Billboard)	51
Canada Country (Billboard)	3
US Billboard Hot 100	46
US Country Airplay (Billboard)	2
US Hot Country Songs (Billboard)	9

=== Year-end charts ===
Chart (2013)	Position
US Country Airplay (Billboard)	21
US Hot Country Songs (Billboard)	36

== Certifications ==
Region	Certification	Certified units/sales
United States (RIAA)	Gold	500,000^{‡}
^{‡} Sales+streaming figures based on certification alone.
